= All-Ireland Senior Club Hurling Championship records and statistics =

This page details statistics of the All-Ireland Senior Club Hurling Championship.

== General performances ==
=== By team ===
Performance in the All-Ireland Senior Club Hurling Championship by team
Team	Won	Runner-up	Years won	Years runner-up
Ballyhale Shamrocks	9	1	1981, 1984, 1990, 2007, 2010, 2015, 2019, 2020, 2023	1979, 2022
Birr	4	2	1995, 1998, 2002, 2003	1992, 2008
Portumna	4	1	2006, 2008, 2009, 2014	2010
Athenry	3	2	1997, 2000, 2001	1988, 2005
Blackrock	3	1	1972, 1974, 1979	1976
James Stephens	3	0	1976, 1982, 2005	
Sarsfields	2	2	1993, 1993	1998, 2025
St. Thomas's	2	1	2013, 2024	2019
St. Finbarr's	2	1	1975, 1978	1981
Cuala	2	0	2017, 2018	
Loughgiel Shamrocks	2	0	1983, 2012	
Glen Rovers	2	0	1973, 1977	
Na Piarsaigh, Limerick	1	1	2016	2018
Clarinbridge	1	1	2011	2002
Newtownshandrum	1	1	2004	2006
St. Joseph's Doora-Barefield	1	1	1999	2000
Buffers Alley	1	1	1989	1986
Borris-Ileigh	1	1	1987	2020
Castlegar	1	1	1980	1985
CLG Na Fianna	1	0	2025	
Ballygunner GAA	1	0	2022	
Sixmilebridge	1	0	1996	
Kiltormer	1	0	1992	
Glenmore	1	0	1991	
Midleton	1	0	1988	
Kilruane MacDonaghs	1	0	1986	
St. Martin's	1	0	1985	
Roscrea	1	0	1971	
Rathnure	0	5		1972, 1974, 1978, 1987, 1999
Dunloy	0	5		1995, 1996, 2003, 2004, 2023
St. Rynagh's	0	3		1971, 1973, 1983
O'Loughlin Gaels	0	2		2011, 2024
Kilmallock	0	2		1993, 2015
Ballyea	0	1		2017
Ruairí Óg, Cushendall	0	1		2016
Mount Leinster Rangers	0	1		2014
Kilcormac/Killoughey	0	1		2013
Coolderry	0	1		2012
De La Salle	0	1		2009
Loughrea	0	1		2007
Graigue-Ballycallan	0	1		2001
Wolfe Tones	0	1		1997
Toomevara	0	1		1994
Patrickswell	0	1		1991
Ballybrown	0	1		1990
O'Donovan Rossa	0	1		1989
Gort	0	1		1984
Mount Sion	0	1		1982
Ballycastle McQuillans	0	1		1980
Camross	0	1		1977
Fenians	0	1		1975

== Player records ==
=== Miscellaneous ===
- Most All-Ireland winners' medals: 6
  - T.J. Reid (Ballyhale Shamrocks) – 2007, 2010, 2015, 2019, 2020, 2023
- Most All-Ireland winners' medals: 5
  - Michael Fennelly (Ballyhale Shamrocks) – 2007, 2010, 2015, 2019, 2020
  - Colin Fennelly (Ballyhale Shamrocks) – 2007, 2010, 2015, 2019, 2020
  - Eoin Reid (Ballyhale Shamrocks) – 2007, 2010, 2015, 2019, 2020
- Most All-Ireland winners' medals: 4
  - Donie Collins (Blackrock, James Stephens) – 1972, 1974, 1979, 1982
  - Joe Errity (Birr) – 1995, 1998, 2002, 2003
  - Brian Whelahan (Birr) – 1995, 1998, 2002, 2003
  - Gary Cahill (Birr) – 1995, 1998, 2002, 2003
  - Johnny Pilkington (Birr) – 1995, 1998, 2002, 2003
  - Declan Pilkington (Birr) – 1995, 1998, 2002, 2003
  - Simon Whelehan (Birr) – 1995, 1998, 2002, 2003
  - Eugene McEntee (Portumna) – 2006, 2008, 2009, 2014
  - Ollie Canning (Portumna) – 2006, 2008, 2009, 2014
  - Gareth Heagney (Portumna) – 2006, 2008, 2009, 2014
  - Leo Smith (Portumna) – 2006, 2008, 2009, 2014
  - Eoin Lynch (Portumna) – 2006, 2008, 2009, 2014
  - Kevin Hayes (Portumna) – 2006, 2008, 2009, 2014
  - Andy Smith (Portumna) – 2006, 2008, 2009, 2014
  - Damien Hayes (Portumna) – 2006, 2008, 2009, 2014
  - Niall Hayes (Portumna) – 2006, 2008, 2009, 2014
  - Joe Canning (Portumna) – 2006, 2008, 2009, 2014
