= Oisín O'Neill (hurler) =

Irish hurler

Personal information
- Native name: Oisín Ó Néill (Irish)
- Born: 1972 (age 53–54) Shinrone, County Offaly, Ireland
- Occupation: Physical therapist
- Height: 5 ft 5 in (165 cm)

Sport
- Sport: Hurling
- Position: Right corner-back
Clubs
- Years: Club
- Shinrone; Birr
Club titles
- Offaly titles: 4
- Leinster titles: 4
- All-Ireland Titles: 2
Inter-county
Years	County	Apps (scores)
1992-1993	Offaly	0 (0-00)
Inter-county titles
- Leinster titles: 0
- All-Irelands: 0
- NHL: 0
- All Stars: 0

Oisín O'Neill (born 1972) is an Irish former hurler. At club level, he played with Shinrone and Birr and at inter-county level with the Offaly senior hurling team.

== Playing career ==
O'Neill attended St Brendan's Community School in Birr and played in all grades of hurling during his time there, including the Leinster Colleges SAHC. At club level, he first played for Shinrone at juvenile and underage levels.

O'Neill subsequently transferred to Birr and was part of the club's most successful era. His four Offaly SHC victories were subsequently converted into four Leinster Club SHC successes. O'Neill was also part of the Birr team that won All-Ireland Club SHC titles in 1995 and 1998.

At inter-county level, O'Neill first played for Offaly as a member of the minor team. He was at left wing-forward when Offaly beat Clare by 2–16 to 1–12 in the 1989 All-Ireland MHC final. O'Neill later progressed to the under-21 team and won consecutive Leinster U21HC medals in 1991 and 1992, however, these provincial wins were subsequently followed by consecutive All-Ireland U21HC final defeats. O'Neill made his senior team debut in a National Hurling League game against Tipperary in November 1992.

== Post-playing career ==
O'Neill was part of the Portumna team's background team, as physio, when they beat Newtownshandrum by 2–08 to 1–06 to win the All-Ireland Club SHC title in 2006.

== Honours ==
Birr

- All-Ireland Senior Club Hurling Championship (2): 1995, 1998
- Leinster Senior Club Hurling Championship (4): 1991, 1994, 1997, 1999
- Offaly Senior Hurling Championship (4): 1991, 1994, 1997, 1999

Offaly

- Leinster Under-21 Hurling Championship (2): 1991, 1992
- All-Ireland Minor Hurling Championship (1): 1989
- Leinster Minor Hurling Championship (1): 1989
