= Joe Errity =

Irish sportsperson

Personal information
- Native name: Seosamh Mac Fhearaite (Irish)
- Born: 3 November 1969 (age 56) Birr, County Offaly, Ireland
- Occupation: Planning consultant
- Height: 5 ft 10 in (178 cm)

Sport
- Sport: Hurling
- Position: Centre-back
Club
- Years: Club
- Birr
Club titles
- Offaly titles: 9
- Leinster titles: 6
- All-Ireland Titles: 4
College
- Years: College
- Athlone Institute of Technology
College titles
- Fitzgibbon titles: 0
Inter-county
Years	County	Apps (scores)
1988-2003	Offaly	31 (7-06)
Inter-county titles
- Leinster titles: 2
- All-Irelands: 2
- NHL: 0
- All Stars: 0

Thomas Joseph Errity (born 3 November 1969) is an Irish hurling manager and former player. At club level, he played with Birr and at inter-county level with the Offaly senior hurling team.

== Playing career ==
Errity attended St Brendan's Community School in Birr and played hurling at all levels during his time there. He won back-to-back Leinster Colleges SAHC medals in 1985 and 1986. Errity was also part of the St Brendan's team that defeated North Monastery by four goals to win the All-Ireland Colleges SAHC title in 1986.

At club level, Errity was a mainstay of the Birr team during their most successful era. He won nine Offaly SHC medals from twelve finals appearances between 1990 and 2005. He also won seven Leinster Club SHC medal. Errity was also part of Birr's four All-Ireland Club SHC title-winning teams and was captain in 1998.

At inter-county level, Errity first appeared for Offaly as part of the minor team that won back-to-back All-Ireland MHC titles in 1986 and 1987. He later progressed to the under-21 team. Errity made his senior team debut in a National Hurling League defeat by Galway in 1988. He won consecutive Leinster SHC medals in 1994 and 1995. Errity came on as a substitute when Offaly beat Limerick by 3–16 to 2–13 in the 1994 All-Ireland SHC final.

Errity was an unused substitute for Offaly's defeat by Clare in the 1995 All-Ireland SHC final. He broke onto the starting fifteen and was at full-forward when Offaly beat Kilkenny by 2–16 to 1–13 to become the first "back door" winners of the All-Ireland SHC title in 1998. Two years later, Errity was at centre-back for Offaly's 5–15 to 1–14 defeat by Kilkenny in the 2000 All-Ireland SHC final. He captained the team in 2002, before retiring from inter-county hurling in February 2004.

== Management career ==
Errity was appointed manager of Offaly's minor team in December 2013. His two years in charge of the team ended without silverware.

== Honours ==
Birr Community School

- All-Ireland Colleges Senior Hurling Championship (1): 1986
- Leinster Colleges Senior Hurling Championship (2): 1985, 1986

Birr

- All-Ireland Senior Club Hurling Championship (4): 1995, 1998, 2002, 2003
- Leinster Senior Club Hurling Championship (6): 1991, 1994, 1997, 1999, 2001, 2002
- Offaly Senior Hurling Championship (9): 1991, 1994, 1997, 1999, 2000, 2001, 2002, 2003, 2005

Offaly

- All-Ireland Senior Hurling Championship (2): 1994, 1998
- Leinster Senior Hurling Championship (2): 1994, 1995
- All-Ireland Minor Hurling Championship (2): 1986, 1987
- Leinster Minor Hurling Championship (2): 1986, 1987

Leinster

- Railway Cup (1): 1998

Sporting positions
Preceded by	Offaly senior hurling team captain 2002	Succeeded by Gary Hanniffy
Achievements
Preceded by Brian Feeney	All-Ireland Club SHC final winning captain 1998	Succeeded by Liam Hassett
