= Declan Pilkington =

Irish hurler

Personal information
- Native name: Déaglán Pilineach (Irish)
- Born: 1969 (age 56–57) Birr, County Offaly, Ireland
- Occupation: Farmer
- Height: 5 ft 10 in (178 cm)

Sport
- Sport: Hurling
- Position: Left corner-forward
Club
- Years: Club
- Birr
Club titles
- Offaly titles: 9
- Leinster titles: 6
- All-Ireland Titles: 4
Inter-county
Years	County	Apps (scores)
1988-1996; 1998	Offaly	20 (1-19)
Inter-county titles
- Leinster titles: 4
- All-Irelands: 1
- NHL: 1
- All Stars: 0

Declan Pilkington (born 1969) is an Irish former hurler. At club level, he played with Birr and at inter-county level with the Offaly senior hurling team.

== Career ==
Pilkington attended St Brendan's Community School in Birr and played hurling at all levels during his time there. He won back-to-back Leinster Colleges SAHC medals in 1985 and 1986. Pilkington was also part of the St Brendan's team that defeated North Monastery by four goals to win the All-Ireland Colleges SAHC title in 1986.

At club level, Pilkington was a mainstay of the Birr team during their most successful era. He won nine Offaly SHC medals from twelve finals appearances between 1990 and 2005. He also won seven Leinster Club SHC medal. Pilkington was also part of Birr's four All-Ireland Club SHC title-winning teams.

At inter-county level, Pilkington first appeared for Offaly as part of the minor team that won back-to-back All-Ireland MHC titles in 1986 and 1987. He later progressed to the under-21 team and was one of the team's top scorers during their run to a defeat by Tipperary in the 1989 All-Ireland U21HC final.

Pilkington made his senior team debut in a defeat by Galway in the 1988 All-Ireland SHC semi-final. He went on to win his first two Leinster SHC medals, alongside his brother Johnny, in 1989 and 1990. Pilkington was also part of Offaly's sole National Hurling League title win in 1991. He added further Leinster SHC medals to his collection in 1994 and 1995 and was at left corner-forward when Offaly beat Limerick by 3–16 to 2–13 in the 1994 All-Ireland SHC final. Pilkington left the panel in 1996 after a dispute with manager Éamonn Cregan. He was briefly recalled to the panel two years later.

== Honours ==
St Brendan's Community School

- All-Ireland Colleges Senior Hurling Championship (1): 1986
- Leinster Colleges Senior Hurling Championship (2): 1985, 1986

Birr

- All-Ireland Senior Club Hurling Championship (4): 1995, 1998, 2002, 2003
- Leinster Senior Club Hurling Championship (6): 1991, 1994, 1997, 1999, 2001, 2002
- Offaly Senior Hurling Championship (9): 1991, 1994, 1997, 1999, 2000, 2001, 2002, 2003, 2005

Offaly

- All-Ireland Senior Hurling Championship (1): 1994
- Leinster Senior Hurling Championship (4): 1989, 1990, 1994, 1995
- National Hurling League (1): 1990–91
- Leinster Under-21 Hurling Championship (1): 1989
- All-Ireland Minor Hurling Championship (2): 1986, 1987
- Leinster Minor Hurling Championship (2): 1986, 1987
