= Donal Franks =

Irish hurler (born 1971)

Personal information
- Native name: Dónall de Frainc (Irish)
- Born: 1971 (age 54–55) Ballyskenagh, County Offaly, Ireland

Sport
- Sport: Hurling
- Position: Left wing-back
Clubs
- Years: Club
- Ballyskanegh; Birr
Club titles
- Offaly titles: 7
- Leinster titles: 3
- All-Ireland Titles: 2
Inter-county
Years	County	Apps (scores)
1992-1994	Offaly	0 (0-00)
Inter-county titles
- Leinster titles: 0
- All-Irelands: 0
- NHL: 0
- All Stars: 0

Donal Franks (born 1971) is an Irish hurling manager and former player. At club level, he played with Ballyskanegh and Birr and at inter-county level with the Offaly senior hurling team.

== Playing career ==
Franks first played hurling for the Ballyskenagh club before transferring to Birr. With his adopted club, he won seven Offaly SHC medals from eight consecutive finals appearances between 1999 and 2006. Franks also won three Leinster Club SHC medals. He was also part of Birr's back-yo-back All-Ireland Club SHC title-winning teams in 2002 and 2003.

At inter-county level, Franks first played for Offaly as a member of the minor team. He was at left wing-back when Offaly beat Clare by 2–16 to 1–12 in the 1989 All-Ireland MHC final. Franks later progressed to the under-21 team and won consecutive Leinster U21HC medals in 1991 and 1992, however, these provincial wins were subsequently followed by consecutive All-Ireland U21HC final defeats. Franks made his senior team debut in a National Hurling League game against Down in October 1992.

== Management career ==
Franks first became involved in management when he took charge of the Shamrocks club. He later coached Clonkill to a defeat by Raharney in the Westmeath SHC final in 2010. Franks became Birr's senior team manager in 2012. He was an unsuccessful candidate for the Westmeath manager's position in 2013, before taking over as Naas manager in 2014. Franks also served as manager with club sides Round Towers and Abbeyleix. He was appointed manager of the Laois intermediate camogie team in 2018.

== Honours ==
Birr

- All-Ireland Senior Club Hurling Championship (2): 2002, 2003
- Leinster Senior Club Hurling Championship (3): 1999, 2001, 2002
- Offaly Senior Hurling Championship (7): 1999, 2000, 2001, 2002, 2003, 2005, 2006

Offaly

- Leinster Under-21 Hurling Championship (2): 1991, 1992
- All-Ireland Minor Hurling Championship (1): 1989
- Leinster Minor Hurling Championship (1): 1989
