= 1998 All-Ireland Senior Club Hurling Championship final =

1998 All-Ireland Senior Club Hurling Championship Final
- Event: 1997–98 All-Ireland Senior Club Hurling Championship
Birr	Sarsfields
1-13	0-9
- Date: 17 March 1998
- Venue: Croke Park, Dublin
- Man of the Match: Brian Whelahan
- Referee: Willie Barrett (Tipperary)
- Attendance: 36,545

The 1998 All-Ireland Senior Club Hurling Championship final was a hurling match played at Croke Park on 17 March 1998 to determine the winners of the 1997–98 All-Ireland Senior Club Hurling Championship, the 28th season of the All-Ireland Senior Club Hurling Championship, a tournament organised by the Gaelic Athletic Association for the champion clubs of the four provinces of Ireland. The final was contested by Birr of Offaly and Sarsfields of Galway, with Birr winning by 1-13 to 0-9.

The All-Ireland final was a unique occasion as it was the first ever championship meeting between Birr and Sarsfields. It remains their only clash in the All-Ireland series. Sarsfields were hoping to win a record-equaling third All-Ireland title while Birr were hoping to win their second title.

Birr had five under-21 players on their team and took command immediately when Paul Carroll set up Darren Hanniffy for a 5th-minute goal. Brian Whelahan won the man of the match award while team captain Joe Errity paid tribute to his father Tom who had died watching Birr defeat Clarecastle in the All-Ireland semi-final.

Birr's All-Ireland victory was their first since 1995. The win gave them their second All-Ireland title overall.

== Match ==
=== Details ===
17 March 1998

Birr	1-13 - 0-9	Sarsfields
D Hanniffy 1-3. G Cahill 0-3 (2f), D Pilkington 0-2. J Pilkington 0-2 (1 sideline), B Whelahan, C McGlone and D Regan 0-1 each.	Report	A Donohue 0-7 (6f), J McGrath and Peter Kelly 0-1 each.

Croke Park, Dublin
Attendance: 36,545
Referee: W Barrett (Tipperary)

Birr	Sarsfields
