= Paul Flynn (Waterford hurler) =

Waterford hurler (born 1974)

Personal information
- Native name: Pól Ó Floinn (Irish)
- Nickname: N/A
- Born: 17 December 1974 (age 51) Waterford, Ireland
- Occupation: Medical Rep
- Height: 1.78 m (5 ft 10 in)

Sport
- Sport: Hurling
- Position: Left corner forward
Club
- Years: Club
- 1992–2009: Ballygunner
Club titles
- Waterford titles: 8
- Munster titles: 1
Inter-county
Years	County	Apps (scores)
1993–2008	Waterford	46 (24–181)
Inter-county titles
- Munster titles: 3
- All-Irelands: 0
- NHL: 1
- All Stars: 1

Paul Flynn (born 17 December 1974) is an Irish former hurler who played as a left wing-forward at senior level for the Waterford county team. He joined the team in 1993 and was a regular member of the starting fifteen until his retirement in 2008.

Flynn is Waterford's top championship scorer of all-time. He has won three Munster winners' medals, one National League winners' medal and one All-Star award. He ended up as an All-Ireland runner-up on one occasion.

At club level Flynn is a one-time Munster medalist with Ballygunner. In addition to this he has won eight county club championship medals.

Also a player of association football, Flynn also won schoolboy international caps as a soccer goalkeeper as well as being a trainee with Aston Villa, he also played a season with Waterford United in the League of Ireland.

A former manager of the Carlow under-21 hurling team, Flynn is currently a selector with the Waterford under-21 hurling team.

Flynn won a GUI senior cup medal in 2014 with Tramore in Carton House, Maynooth.

The hurling 20/20 committee released their recommendations on 6 January 2015 Flynn was part of The group set up by GAA President Liam O'Neill.

== Playing career ==
=== Club ===
Flynn plays his club hurling with the Ballygunner club in Waterford.

In 1992 Flynn was still a minor when he won his first county club championship medal following a 1–12 to 2–7 defeat of Mount Sion. It was the club's first title in twenty-four years.

Ballygunner surrendered their club title the following year, but were back in the final again in 1995 to face Mount Sion. Flynn played in a match that finished all square but missed Ballygunner's 3–13 to 1–17 replay victory due to suspension, having been sent off in an under-21 match between the drawn match and the replay. It was the first of three county final victories in-a-row for Ballygunner, defeating Lismore in 1996 and Passage in 1997.

Four club titles in-a-row proved beyond Ballygunner; however, the club recovered in 1999, with Flynn winning a fifth county championship medal following a five-point defeat of old rivals Mount Sion.

After a defeat by Mount Sion in the championship decider in 2000, Flynn secured a sixth championship medal in 2001 when Ballygunner accounted for Lismore. He later claimed a Munster winners' medal after his club accounted for Blackrock in the provincial final.

After the high of winning the provincial title Ballygunner went on to lose three club championship finals in succession. They broke this unenviable record at the fourth attempt with Flynn winning a seventh county championship medal following a 2–10 to 1–12 defeat of De La Salle.

Ballygunner lost two further finals in succession before Flynn won his eight championship medal in 2009 following a one-point defeat of Lismore after a draw and a replay.

=== Inter-county ===
Flynn first came to prominence on the inter-county scene as a member of the Waterford minor and under-21 teams. In 1992, he won a Munster medal in the minor grade following an exciting two-game saga with provincial kingpins Tipperary. Waterford later qualified for the All-Ireland final, however, Galway were far superior on the day and had an easy 1–13 to 2–4 victory.

That same year saw Flynn play a key role with the Waterford under-21 team. He came on as a substitute to win a Munster medal in that grade before later lining out in the All-Ireland final. Offaly provided the opposition on that occasion, however, the game ended in a draw. The replay saw Waterford take the title by 0–12 to 2–3 and Flynn collected an All-Ireland under-21 medal.

Flynn added a second Munster under-21 title to his collection in 1994, however, there would be no further All-Ireland success.

Flynn's performances at underage levels brought him to the attention of the senior selectors and he made his senior debut in the 1993 championship. It was a less than auspicious start to Flynn's hurling career as Waterford were defeated by the minnows of Kerry in the opening round of the Munster championship. It was one of the lowest points in Waterford hurling.

In 1998 Flynn played in his first Munster final in the senior grade. Waterford held All-Ireland champions Clare to a draw in the Munster final, however, the Decies lost the replay. Flynn's side later faced Kilkenny in what would be the county's first All Ireland semi final appearance in Croke Park since 1963. Kilkenny won by a single point.

In 2002 Waterford emerged from the doldrums by reaching the Munster final once again. Flynn was the game's top scorer as he collected his first Munster winners' medal as Waterford defeated Tipperary by 2–23 to 3–12. It was their first provincial crown in thirty-nine years. Waterford's hurling odyssey came to an end in the All-Ireland semi-final.

After surrendering the Munster title to Cork in 2003, Flynn's side were back in the provincial final for a third successive year in 2004. Waterford defeated Cork in a Munster final for the first time in forty-five years to take the title by 3–16 to 1–21. One of the highlights of the game was a Flynn goal from a close-in free. An All-Ireland appearance subsequently eluded the team yet again. In spite of this there was some consolation at the end of the year as Flynn won his sole All-Star award.

The following few years proved difficult for Flynn. Waterford crashed out of the early stages of the provincial championship in 2005 and 2006. On both these occasions his team was defeated by Cork in the All-Ireland series.

In 2007 Flynn added a National Hurling League medal to his collection when Waterford defeated Kilkenny by 0–20 to 0–18 in the final. He later claimed a third Munster winners' medal as Waterford defeated Limerick by 3–17 to 1–14 in the provincial decider. While Waterford were viewed as possibly going on and winning the All-Ireland title for the first time in almost half a century, Limerick ambushed Waterford in the All-Ireland semi-final.

2008 began poorly for Waterford as the team lost their opening game to Clare as well as their manager Justin McCarthy. In spite of this poor start Flynn's side reached the All-Ireland final for the first time in forty-five years. Kilkenny provided the opposition and went on to defeat Waterford by 3–30 to 1–13 to claim a third All-Ireland title in-a-row. Following this defeat Flynn brought the curtain down on his inter-county career.

=== Inter-provincial ===
Flynn was also a regular on the Munster team at various times between 1994 and 2000. He won two Railway Cup medals on the field of play in 1994 and 2000, while also claiming a third as a non-playing substitute in 1996.

== Managerial career ==
=== Carlow ===
After retiring from playing, Flynn took up his first management role when he took over the Carlow under-21 hurling team in 2011.

His first season in charge ended with a four-goal drubbing by Dublin in the opening round of the championship.

In 2012 Flynn's side had high hopes of qualifying for the Leinster final, however, Laois defeated Carlow by just a single point in the provincial semi-final.

=== Down ===
It was announced in November 2012 that Flynn was to join Gerard Monan's back-room team with the Down senior hurling team for the 2013 season.

== Career statistics ==
=== Club ===
Team	Year	Waterford		Munster		All-Ireland		Total	
Team	Year	Apps	Score	Apps	Score	Apps	Score	Apps	Score
Ballygunner	1992-93	3	0-09	1	0-02	—		4	0-11
Ballygunner	1993-94	7	5-29	—		—		7	5-29
Ballygunner	1994-95	7	4-39	—		—		7	4-39
Ballygunner	1995-96	9	8-37	3	2-04	—		12	10-41
Ballygunner	1996-97	x	x-xx	3	3-21	—		x	x-xx
Ballygunner	1997-98	x	x-xx	2	2-09	—		x	x-xx
Ballygunner	1998-99	x	x-xx	—		—		x	x-xx
Ballygunner	1999-00	4	3-30	3	1-17	—		7	4-47
Ballygunner	2000-01	4	1-26	—		—		4	1-26
Ballygunner	2001-02	x	x-xx	3	1-38	1	0-04	x	x-xx
Ballygunner	2002-03	x	x-xx	—		—		x	x-xx
Ballygunner	2003-04	x	x-xx	—		—		x	x-xx
Ballygunner	2004-05	x	x-xx	—		—		x	x-xx
Ballygunner	2005-06	x	x-xx	3	4-11	—		x	x-xx
Ballygunner	2006-07	5	1-10	—		—		5	1-10
Ballygunner	2007-08	3	1-05	—		—		3	1-05
Ballygunner	2008-09	2	2-09	—		—		2	2-09
Ballygunner	2009-10	8	2-43	2	0-13	—		10	2-43

=== Inter-county ===
Team	Year	National League			Munster		All-Ireland		Total	
Team	Year	Division	Apps	Score	Apps	Score	Apps	Score	Apps	Score
Waterford	1992-93	Division 1B	0	0-00	1	3-02	—		1	3-02
Waterford	1993-94	Division 1	7	0-39	1	0-04	—		8	0-43
Waterford	1994-95	Division 2	9	4-44	1	0-03	—		10	4-47
Waterford	1995-96	Division 1	4	0-04	1	1-05	—		5	1-09
Waterford	1997	Division 2	7	5-42	1	1-07	—		8	6-49
Waterford	1998	Division 1B	7	5-31	4	1-22	2	0-08	13	6-61
Waterford	1999	Division 1B	4	5-11	2	2-12	—		6	7-23
Waterford	2000	Division 1B	7	0-41	1	0-03	—		8	0-44
Waterford	2001	Division 1B	6	3-26	1	1-04	—		7	4-30
Waterford	2002	Division 1A	5	3-18	2	1-18	1	1-04	8	5-40
Waterford	2003	Division 1A	5	3-12	4	6-16	1	0-03	10	9-31
Waterford	2004	Division 1A	9	5-58	3	1-10	1	0-13	13	6-81
Waterford	2005	Division 1A	6	3-28	1	1-06	4	2-20	11	6-54
Waterford	2006	Division 1A	6	2-32	1	0-05	3	1-02	10	3-39
Waterford	2007	Division 1A	2	0-01	2	1-03	3	1-09	7	2-13
Waterford	2008	Division 1A	0	0-00	0	0-00	5	0-01	5	0-01
Total		Division 1A	84	38-387	26	19-120	20	5-60	130	62-567

== Honours ==
=== Team ===
Ballygunner

- Munster Senior Club Hurling Championship (1): 2001
- Waterford Senior Club Hurling Championship (8): 1992, 1995, 1996, 1997, 1999, 2001, 2005, 2009

Waterford

- Munster Senior Hurling Championship (3): 2002, 2004, 2007
- National Hurling League (1): 2007
- All-Ireland Under-21 Hurling Championship (1): 1992
- Munster Under-21 Hurling Championship (2): 1992, 1994
- Munster Minor Hurling Championship (1): 1992

Munster

- Inter-provincial Championship (1): 1995, 2000

=== Individual ===
- All-Stars (1): 2004 9 times nominationed

Sporting positions
Preceded by Brian Flannery	Waterford Senior Hurling Captain; 2000	Succeeded by Ken McGrath
Preceded by Eoin Kelly	Waterford Senior Hurling Captain; 2006	Succeeded by Michael Walsh
Preceded by Kevin Ryan	Carlow Under-21 Hurling Manager; 2011–2012	Succeeded by Pat English
