= 1992 All-Ireland Senior Club Hurling Championship final =

1992 All-Ireland Senior Club Hurling Championship Final
- Event: 1991–92 All-Ireland Senior Club Hurling Championship
Kiltormer	Birr
0-15	1-8
- Date: 29 March 1992
- Venue: Semple Stadium, Thurles
- Referee: Dickie Murphy (Wexford)
- Attendance: 13,855

The 1992 All-Ireland Senior Club Hurling Championship final was a hurling match played at Croke Park on 29 March 1992 to determine the winners of the 1991–92 All-Ireland Senior Club Hurling Championship, the 22nd season of the All-Ireland Senior Club Hurling Championship, a tournament organised by the Gaelic Athletic Association for the champion clubs of the four provinces of Ireland. The final was contested by Kiltormer of Galway and Birr of Offaly, with Kiltormer winning by 0-15 to 1-8.

The All-Ireland final was a unique occasion as it was the first ever championship meeting between Kiltormer and Birr. It remains their only championship meeting at this level. Both sides were hoping to make history by winning their first All-Ireland title.

Kiltormer stalwarts Ollie Kilkenny and Brendan Dervan were ruled out of the final through injury after a three-game saga with Cashel King Cormacs in the semi-final. The final failed to top that excitement with Kiltormer claiming a 0-15 to 1-8 victory.

Kiltormer's victory secured their first All-Ireland title. They became the 15th club to win the All-Ireland title, while they were the second Galway representatives to claim the ultimate prize.

== Match ==
=== Details ===
29 March 1992

Kiltormer	0-15 - 1-8	Birr
D Curley 0-7 (4f), J Campbell 0-3, C Hayes 0-2 (1f and 1 '70'), M Staunton 0-1, T Furey 0-1, T Kilkenny 0-1.		R Landy 1-0, D Pilkington 0-3, J Errity 0-2 (0-2 from '70s'), G Cahill 0-2, D Regan 0-1.

Croke Park, Dublin
Attendance: 13,855
Referee: D Murphy (Wexford)

Kiltormer	Birr
