= 1995 All-Ireland Senior Club Hurling Championship final =

- Event: 1994–95 All-Ireland Senior Club Hurling Championship
Birr	Dunloy
Birr	Dunloy
0-9	0-9
- Date: 17 March 1995
- Venue: Croke Park, Dublin
- Referee: Pat O'Connor (Limerick)
- Attendance: 18,544

Replay
Birr	Dunloy
3-13	2-3
- Date: 2 April 1995
- Venue: Croke Park, Dublin
- Referee: Pat O'Connor (Limerick)
- Attendance: 6,395

The 1995 All-Ireland Senior Club Hurling Championship final was a hurling match played at Croke Park on 17 March 1995 to determine the winners of the 1994–95 All-Ireland Senior Club Hurling Championship, the 25th season of the All-Ireland Senior Club Hurling Championship, a tournament organised by the Gaelic Athletic Association for the champion clubs of the four provinces of Ireland. The final was contested by Birr of Offaly and Dunloy of Antrim, with the game ending in a 0-9 apiece draw. The replay took place on 24 March 1995, with Birr winning by 3-13 to 2-3.

The All-Ireland final was a unique occasion as it was the first ever championship meeting between Birr and Dunloy. Both sides were hoping to make history by winning their first All-Ireland title.

The first game was played in deplorable conditions. Dunloy had led for 52 minutes, however, Birr looked to have snatched victory as the game entered lost time. Tony McGrath snatched an equalizer for Dunloy eight seconds into injury time to tie the game at 0-9 apiece.

Birr dominated the replay after Paul Murphy and Oisín O'Neill goals in the first and third minutes gave them an unprecedented 2-7 to no score half-time lead. Birr continued the rout in the second half and powered to a 3-13 to 2-3 victory.

Birr's victory secured their first All-Ireland title. They became the 17th club to win the All-Ireland title, while they were the first Offaly representatives to claim the ultimate prize.

== Match details ==
=== Drawn match ===
17 March 1995

Birr	0-9 - 0-9	Dunloy
D Pilkington 0-2, A Cahill 0-2, D Regan 0-1, J Pilkington 0-1, C McGlone 0-1, O O'Neill 0-1, P Murphy 0-1.		Gregory O'Kane 0-3, A Elliott 0-2, T McGrath 0-2, P Molloy 0-1, E McKee 0-1.

Croke Park, Dublin
Attendance: 18,544
Referee: P O'Connor (Limerick)

Birr	Dunloy

=== Replay ===
2 April 1995

Birr	3-13 - 2-3	Dunloy
B Whelehan 1-4 (1-3f), A Cahill 0-6 (4f), D Pilkington 1-2, P Murphy 1-0, C McGlone 0-1.		J Elliott 1-0, A Elliott 1-0, E McKee 0-2, S McMullan 0-1.

Croke Park, Dublin
Attendance: 6,395
Referee: P O'Connor (Limerick)

Birr	Dunloy
