= 1994–95 All-Ireland Senior Club Hurling Championship =

All-Ireland Senior Club Hurling Championship 1994–95
Championship Details
- Dates: 14 August 1994 – 2 April 1995
- Teams: 30

All Ireland Champions
- Winners: Birr (1st win)
- Captain: Johnny Pilkington
- Manager: Pádraig Horan

All Ireland Runners-up
- Runners-up: Dunloy
- Captain: Gary O'Kane
- Manager: Phonsie Kearns

Provincial Champions
- Munster: Kilmallock
- Leinster: Birr
- Ulster: Dunloy
- Connacht: Athenry

Championship Statistics
- Matches Played: 33
- Top Scorer: Paddy Kelly (1–26)

The 1994–95 All-Ireland Senior Club Hurling Championship was the 25th staging of the All-Ireland Senior Club Hurling Championship, the Gaelic Athletic Association's premier inter-county club hurling tournament. The championship ran from 14 August 1994 to 17 March 1995.

Sarsfields of Galway were the defending champions, however, they failed to qualify after being beaten by Athenry in the final of the 1994 Galway SHC. Naas of Kildare, St. Dominic's of Roscommon, Tullaroan of Kilkenny and Oulart-the Ballagh of Wexford made their first appearances in the championship.

The All-Ireland final, a replay, was played at Croke Park in Dublin on 2 April 1995, between Birr of Offaly and Dunloy of Antrim, in what was a first championship meeting between the teams. Birr won the match by 3–13 to 2–03 to claim a first title.

Kilmallock's Paddy Kelly was the championship's top scorer with 1–26.

== Team summaries ==
Team	County	Most recent success		
Team	County	All-Ireland	Provincial	County
Ballycran	Down		1993	1993
Ballyduff	Kerry			1993
Birr	Offaly		1991	1991
Camross	Laois		1976	1993
Castleblayney Faughs	Monaghan			1992
Clarecastle	Clare			1991
Dunloy	Antrim		1990	1990
Craobh Rua	Sligo			1993
Crumlin	Dublin		1979	1979
Keady Lámh Dhearg	Armagh			1993
Kilmallock	Limerick		1992	1992
Killyclogher St. Mary's	Tyrone			1991
Kiltegan	Wicklow			1993
Lisbellaw St Patrick's	Fermanagh			1993
Midleton	Cork	1988	1987	1991
Mount Sion	Waterford			1988
Naomh Eoin	Carlow			1993
Naas	Kildare			1952
Oulart-the Ballagh	Wexford			
Raharney	Westmeath			1992
Seán Treacy's	London			1991
St. Dominic's	Roscommon			1967
St. Mary's Athenry	Galway		1987	1987
St. Mary's Kiltoghert	Leitrim			1993
Toomevara	Tipperary		1993	1993
Tooreen	Mayo			1993
Trim	Meath			1991
Tularoan	Kilkenny			1958
Wolfe Tones	Longford			1993
Wolfe Tones	Louth			1991

== Results ==
=== Connacht Senior Club Hurling Championship ===
First round

2 October 1994 First round	St. Mary's Kiltoghert	1–10 – 0–09	Craobh Rua	Páirc Seán Mac Diarmada, Carrick
	A O'Shea 0–9, B Beirne 1–0, J Butler 0–1.

Quarter-final

16 October 1994 Quarter-final	St. Mary's Kiltoghert	1–03 – 3–13	Tooreen	Páirc Seán Mac Diarmada, Carrick
	J Butler 1–0, A O'Shea 0–1, B Beirne 0–1, P Murray 0–1.		M Gorman 1–3, P Higgins 1–1, D Greally 0–4, C Jordan 1–0, D Henry 0–2, J Cunnane 0–2, D Greally 0–1.

Semi-final

30 October 1994 Semi-final	St. Dominic's	2–10 – 0–07	Tooreen	Athleague Sportsfield, Athleague
	P Lyons 0–6, M Lyons 1–0, D Kilcline 1–0, A Kelly 0–2, T Killian 0–1, D Naughton 0–1.		J Cunnane 0–3, Dom Greally 0–2, G Greally 0–1, M Gorman 0–1.

Final

13 November 1994 Final	St. Dominic's	2–3 – 2–20	Athenry	Athleague Sportsfield, Athleague
	A Kelly 1–0, D Kilcline 1–0, L Murray 0–3.		J Rabbitte 1–3, D Higgins 1–3, B Morrissey 0–5, C Moran 0–5, D Moran 1–0, B Keogh 0–2, B Hanley 0–1, P Higgins 0–1.

=== Leinster Senior Club Hurling Championship ===
Preliminary round

2 October 1994 Preliminary round	Wolfe Tones (Longford)	2–08 – 0–08	Wolfe Tones (Louth)	Michael Fay Park, Longford
	M McLoughlin 2–0, M Cassidy 0–4, J Lynn 0–3, B Connell 0–1.		O Kelly 0–7, T Corcoran 0–1.

First round

15 October 1994 First round	Trim	2–06 – 0–18	Naomh Eoin	St. Loman's Park, Trim
	M Murray 1–1, T Massey 1–0, D Murray 0–2, B Murray 0–1, A Smith 0–1, D O'Keeffe 0–1.		M Slye 0–7, P Quirke 0–4, D Treacy 0–3, D Murphy 0–2, J Byrne 0–1, K Nolan 0–1.

16 October 1994 First round	Kiltegan	0–14 – 1–06	Naas	Aughrim County Ground, Aughrim
	J Keogh 0–8, S Byrne 0–2, N Byrne 0–1, J O'Toole 0–1, J Harmon 0–1, M Cullen 0–1.		E Denieffe 0–4, P Buggy 1–0, P Rohan 0–1, J Kinlon 0–1.

16 October 1994 First round	Wolfe Tones (Longford)	1–02 – 2–15	Raharney	Pearse Park, Longford
	R Gallagher 1–0, M Cassidy 0–1, G Bermingham 0–1.		T Raleigh 1–1, M Doyle 1–1, D Weir 0–3, J Fleming 0–3, M Farrelly 0–3, A Weir 0–1, J Coyne 0–1, N Croash 0–1, L Doyle 0–1.

Quarter-finals

29 October 1994 Quarter-final	Naomh Eoin	0–10 – 2–09	Raharney	Dr. Cullen Park, Carlow
	M Slye 0–6, C Jordan 0–2, S Foley 0–2.		D Weir 1–2, J Fleming 0–5, M Farrelly 1–0, P Connaughton 0–1, N Croash 0–1.

30 October 1994 Quarter-final	Oulart-the Ballagh	1–12 – 0–05	Camross	Wexford Park, Wexford
	P Redmond 1–2, S Dunne 0–4, M Storey 0–2, B Redmond 0–2, J Mythen 0–1, J Rossiter 0–1.		O Dowling 0–1, F Lalor 0–1, F Dowling 0–1, M Collier 0–1, D Dowling 0–1.	Referee: A Mac Suibhne (Dublin)

30 October 1994 Quarter-final	Tullaroan	1–13 – 1–09	Crumlin	Nowlan Park, Kilkenny
	D Gaffney 0–7, S Teehan 1–2, D Walsh 0–2, P Doheny 0–1, B Hennessy 0–1.		B McMahon 1–1, D Eustace 0–4, D Murphy 0–2, R Elliott 0–1, A Murphy 0–1.

5 November 1994 Quarter-final	Birr	1–09 – 1–04	Kiltegan	St. Brendan's Park, Birr
	J Pilkington 1–1, D Pilkington 0–3, R Landy 0–1, A Cahill 0–1, S Whelehan 0–1, G Cahill 0–1, B Whelehan 0–1.		J Kehoe 1–2, A Coleman 0–1, S Byrne 0–1.	Referee: P Aherne (Carlow)

Semi-finals

13 November 1994 Semi-final	Birr	1–15 – 1–04	Raharney
	D Pilkington 1–1, O O'Neill 0–4, B Whelehan 0–2, P Murphy 0–2, S Whelehan 0–2, J Pilkington 0–1, F Pilkington 0–1, D Regan 0–1, F Feenane 0–1.		N Weir 1–0, P Connaughton 0–1, J Coyne 0–1, N Lynch 0–1, N Croach 0–1.

13 November 1994 Semi-final	Oulart-the Ballagh	1–12 – 1–05	Tullaroan	Dr. Cullen Park, Carlow
	S Dunne 1–3, M Redmond 0–2, M Storey 0–2, J Ormonde 0–1, M Dempsey 0–1, L Dunne 0–1, J Cleary 0–1, P Redmond 0–1.		D Walsh 1–1, D Gaffney 0–2, P Doheny 0–1, S Teehan 0–1.	Referee: S O'Meara (Offaly)

Finals

27 November 1994 Final	Birr	0–10 – 1–07	Oulart-the-Ballagh	Nowlan Park, Kilkenny
	S Whelehan 0–3, O O'Neill 0–3, G Cahill 0–1, B Whelehan 0–1, C McClone 0–1, D Pilkington 0–1.		M Storey 1–1, L Dunne 0–2, S Dunne 0–1, B O'Connor 0–1, P Redmond 0–1, M Dempsey 0–1.	Referee: P Delaney (Laois)

4 December 1994 Final replay	Birr	3–07 – 2–05	Oulart-the-Ballagh	Nowlan Park, Kilkenny
	P Murphy 2–0, D Pilkington 1–0, S Whelehan 0–2, D Regan 0–2, G Cahill 0–1, O O'Neill 0–1, B Whelehan 0–1.		M Dempsey 1–0, J Cleary 1–0, M Storey 0–2, S Dunne 0–1, L Dunne 0–1, P Redmond 0–1.	Referee: P Delaney (Laois)

=== Munster Senior Club Hurling Championship ===
Quarter-finals

16 October 1994 Quarter-final	Midleton	2–19 – 0–09	Mount Sion	Clonmult Park, Midleton
	G Manley 2–11, D Quirke 0–2, N O'Neill 0–2, K Roche 0–1, K Hennessy 0–1, M O'Mahony 0–1, G Fitzgerald 0–1.		G Gater 0–3, J Meaney 0–2, P Fanning 0–2, B Coughlan 0–1, R McGrath 0–1.	Referee: S McDonnell (Tipperary)

16 October 1994 Quarter-final	Toomevara	1–18 – 1–06	Ballyduff	St. Michael's Park, Toomevara
	Tommy Dunne 0–10, L Nolan 1–2, M Murphy 0–3, L Flaherty 0–1, T Delaney 0–1, K McCormack 0–1.		J Hennessy 0–4, J O'Carroll 1–0, C Ross 0–1.	Referee: T Lyons (Limerick)

Semi-finals

29 October 1994 Semi-final	Clarecastle	1–11 – 1–12	Toomevara	Cusack Park, Ennis
	J Healy 0–6, F Tuohy 1–1, G O'Loughlin 0–3, A Neville 0–1.		L Nolan 1–4, M Murphy 0–3, T Dunne 0–2, M O'Meara 0–1, G Frend 0–1, T Delaney 0–1.	Referee: T Murray (Limerick)

30 October 1994 Semi-final	Kilmallock	0–10 – 1–07	Midleton	FitzGerald Park, Kilmallock
	P Kelly 0–5, M Houlihan 0–2, D Clarke 0–2, M Nelligan 0–1.		G Manley 1–3, D Quirke 0–2, P O'Brien 0–1, K Hennessy 0–1.

13 November 1994 Semi-final replay	Midleton	2–07 – 0–14	Kilmallock	Clonmult Park, Midleton
	P O'Brien 2–0, G Manley 0–2, M O'Mahony 0–2, G Fitzgerald 0–1, E Crotty 0–1, D Quirke 0–1.		P Kelly 0–5, M Nelligan 0–3, L Neenan 0–2, D Clarke 0–2, P Barrett 0–1, P Dowling 0–1.	Referee: S McMahon (Clare)

Final

27 November 1994 Final	Toomevara	1–11 – 2–11	Kilmallock	Semple Stadium, Thurles
	Tommy Dunne 0–8, K Kennedy 1–0, M O'Meara 0–2, T Carroll 0–1.		P Kelly 1–2, P Tobin 0–3, B Hanley 1–0, L Neenan 0–2, P Barrett 0–2, M Nelligan 0–1, P Dowling 0–1.

=== Ulster Senior Club Hurling Championship ===
Semi-finals

25 September 1994 Semi-final	Lavey	2–18 – 1–02	Keady Lámh Dhearg	Athletic Grounds, Armagh
	O Collins 0–9, M Collins 1–4, H Downey 1–2, A McCrystal 0–2, E McNally 0–1.		V Mone 1–0, S Hughes 0–1, J McCormack 0–1.

25 September 1994 Semi-final	Dunloy	2–13 – 1–09	Ballycran	Athletic Grounds, Armagh
	Greg O'Kane 0–8, E McKee 1–1, A Elliott 1–0, S McMullan 0–1, M Maguire 0–1, C McGuckian 0–1, J Cunning 0–1.		D O'Prey 1–6, C Arthurs 0–2, K Blaney 0–1.

Final

16 October 1994 Final	Dunloy	3–09 – 1–12	Lavey	Casement Park, Belfast
	Greg O'Kane 1–4, A Elliott 1–1, N Elliott 1–0, S McGuckian 0–2, S McMullen 0–1.		H Downey 1–3, O Collins 0–6, M Collins 0–2, A McCrystal 0–1.

=== All-Ireland Senior Club Hurling Championship ===
Quarter-final

11 December 1994 Quarter-final	Seán Treacy's	0–10 – 1–16	Kilmallock	Emerald GAA Grounds, Ruislip
	T Maloney 0–8, J Kelly 0–1, M Fleming 0–1.		P Kelly 0–10, P Tobin 1–1, M Houlihan 0–2, L Neenan 0–1, M Nelligan 0–1, P Barrett 0–1.	Referee: A Mac Suibhne (Dublin)

Semi-finals

19 February 1995 Semi-final	Birr	2–8 – 0–9	Kilmallock	Semple Stadium, Thurles
	R Landy 2–1, D Regan 0–2, A Cahill 0–2, J Pilkington 0–2, O O'Neill 0–1.		P Kelly 0–4, P Tobin 0–2, M Nelligan 0–1, P Barrett 0–1, L Neenan 0–1.	Attendance: 9,094; Referee: D Murphy (Wexford)

19 February 1995 Semi-final	Dunloy	2–10 – 1–11	Athenry	St. Tiernach's Park, Clones
	J Elliott 1–3, G O'Kane 0–5, J Cunning 1–0, C McGuckian 0–1, P Molloy 0–1.		C Moran 0–5, P Higgins 1–1, B Keogh 0–3, J Rabbitte 0–2.	Referee: A Mac Suibhne (Dublin)

Finals

17 March 1995 Final	Birr	0–9 – 0–9	Dunloy	Croke Park, Dublin
	D Pilkington 0–2, A Cahill 0–2, D Regan 0–1, J Pilkington 0–1, C McGlone 0–1, O O'Neill 0–1, P Murphy 0–1.		Gregory O'Kane 0–3, A Elliott 0–2, T McGrath 0–2, P Molloy 0–1, E McKee 0–1.	Attendance: 18,544; Referee: P o'Connor (Limerick)

2 April 1995 Final replay	Birr	3–13 – 2–3	Dunloy	Croke Park, Dublin
	B Whelehan 1–4 (1-3f), A Cahill 0–6 (4f), D Pilkington 1–2, P Murphy 1–0, C McGlone 0–1.		J Elliott 1–0, A Elliott 1–0, E McKee 0–2, S McMullan 0–1.	Attendance: 6,395; Referee: P O'Connor (Limerick)

== Championship statistics ==
=== Top scorers ===
Top scorers overall

Rank	Player	County	Tally	Total	Matches	Average
1	Paddy Kelly	Kilmallock	1–26	29	5	5.80
2	Ger Manley	Midleton	3–16	25	3	8.33
3	Gregory O'Kane	Dunloy	0–23	23	5	4.60
4	Tommy Dunne	Toomevara	0–20	20	3	6.66
5	Ollie Collins	Lavey	0–15	15	2	7.50
6	Declan Pilkington	Birr	2-08	14	7	2.00
7	John Keogh	Kiltegan	1–10	13	2	6.50
8	Liam Nolan	Toomevara	2-06	12	3	4.00
8	Seán Dunne	Oulart-the Ballagh	1-09	12	4	3.00
8	Mick Slye	Naomh Eoin	0–12	12	2	6.00

Top scorers in a single game

Rank	Player	Club	Tally	Total	Opposition
1	Ger Manley	Midelton	2–11	17	Mount Sion
2	Tommy Dunne	Toomevara	0–10	10	Ballyduff
2	Paddy Kelly	Kilmallock	0–10	10	Seán Treacy's
3	Dermot O'Prey	Ballycran	1-06	9	Dunloy
3	Alan O'Shea	St. Mary's Kiltoghert	0-09	9	Craobh Rua
3	Ollie Collins	Lavey	0-09	9	Keady Lámh Dhearg
4	John Keogh	Kiltegan	0-08	8	Naas
4	Tommy Dunne	Toomevara	0-08	8	Kilmallock
4	Gregory O'Kane	Dunloy	0-08	8	Ballycran
4	Timmy Moloney	Seán Treacy's	0-08	8	Kilmallock
