= 2001 Offaly Senior Hurling Championship =

Annual hurling competition season

- Champions: Birr (16th title); Simon Whelehan (captain)
- Runners-up: St Rynagh's; Darragh Kelly (captain)

The 2001 Offaly Senior Hurling Championship was the 104th staging of the Offaly Senior Hurling Championship since its establishment by the Offaly County Board in 1896.

Birr were the defending champions.

The final was played on 7 October 2001 at St Brendan's Park in Birr, between Birr and St Rynagh's, in what was their first meeting in the final in two years. Birr won the match by 0–11 to 0–10 to claim their 16th championship title overall and a third title in succession.

== Results ==
=== Semi-finals ===
15 September 2001 Semi-final	St Rynagh's	3-08 - 0-13	Tullamore	St Brendan's Park
	G Healy 2-0, E McHugh 1-0, F Dolan 0-2, J Ryan 0-2, G O'Connor 0-2, D Kelly 0-1, E Martin 0-1.		D Fox 0-7, P Kelly 0-2, K Martin 0-2, PJ Martin 0-1, J Duffy 0-1.

15 September 2001 Semi-final	Birr	1-13 - 1-13	Coolderry	St Brendan's Park
	Brian Whelehan 0-4, S Whelehan 0-4, S Brown 0-4, D Pilkington 1-0, G Hanniffy 0-1.		D Murray 1-9, B Carroll 0-3, A Hall 0-1.

22 September 2001 Semi-final replay	Birr	5-20 - 1-08	Coolderry	St Brendan's Park
	R Hanniffy 3-2, S Brown 0-5, P Molloy 1-1, G Hanniffy 1-0, J Pilkington 0-3, D Pilkington 0-2, Brian Whelehan 0-2, S Whelehan 0-2, D Franks 0-1, N Claffey 0-1, Barry Whelehan 0-1.		B Carroll 1-2, D Murray 0-4, B Teehan 0-1, D Dooley 0-1.

=== Final ===
7 October 2001 Final	Birr	0-11 - 0-10	St Rynagh's	St Brendan's Park
	S Whelahan 0-4 (3f), G Hanniffy, Barry Whelahan 0-2, N Claffey, J Pilkington, D Pilkington 0-1.		F Dolan 0-4 (3f), G O'Connor, J Ryan 0-2, E Martin 0-2 (2f).
