= 2000 Offaly Senior Hurling Championship =

Annual hurling competition season

- Champions: Birr (15th title); Gary Cahill (captain); Pad Joe Whelehan (manager)
- Runners-up: Seir Kieran; Paddy Connors (captain); Paddy O'Meara (manager)

The 2000 Offaly Senior Hurling Championship was the 103rd staging of the Offaly Senior Hurling Championship since its establishment by the Offaly County Board in 1896.

Birr were the defending champions.

The final, delayed because of an outbreak of foot-and-mouth disease, was played on 25 March 2001 at St Brendan's Park in Birr, between Birr and Seir Kieran, in what was their fourth meeting in the final overall and a first meeting in the final in three years. Birr won the match by 3–21 to 1–09 to claim their 15th championship title overall and a second title in succession.

== Results ==
=== Semi-finals ===
3 December 2000 Semi-final	Seir Kieran	0-11 - 0-10	Kilcormac–Killoughey	St Rynagh's Park
	Johnny Dooley 0-5, M Coughlan 0-3, Joe Dooley 0-2, S Dooley 0-1.		C Cassidy 0-5, J Leahy 0-4, M Leonard 0-1.

3 December 2000 Semi-final	Birr	3-13 - 0-11	St Rynagh's	Lusmagh Grounds
	G Hanniffy 3-5, S Whelehan 0-4, L Power 0-2, B Whelehan 0-1, D Pilkington 0-1.		E Martin 0-6, D Kelly 0-2, N Woods 0-1, K Kelly 0-1, K McGee 0-1.

=== Final ===
25 March 2001 Final	Birr	3-21 - 1-09	Seir Kieran	St Brendan's Park
	G Hanniffy 1-5, P Molloy 1-4, R Hanniffy 1-2, S Whelehan 0-4, L Power 0-3, D Pilkington 0-2, S Browne 0-1.		Johnny Dooley 0-5, B Dooley 1-1, Joe Dooley 0-2, M Coughlan 0-1.
