= 1994 Offaly Senior Hurling Championship =

Annual hurling competition season

- Champions: Birr (12th title); Johnny Pilkington (captain)
- Runners-up: Seir Kieran; Kieran Dooley (captain)

The 1994 Offaly Senior Hurling Championship was the 97th staging of the Offaly Senior Hurling Championship since its establishment by the Offaly County Board in 1896.

St Rynagh's were the defending champions.

The final was played on 30 October 1994 at St Brendan's Park in Birr, between Birr and Seir Kieran, in what was their second meeting in the final overall and a first meeting in the final in three years. Birr won the match by 0–08 to 0–06 to claim their 12th championship title overall and a first title in three years.

== Results ==
=== Semi-finals ===
16 October 1994 Semi-final	Birr	2-14 - 3-08	St Rynagh's	St Brendan's Park
	A Cahill 1-6, J Pilkington 1-1, D Pilkington 0-3, P Murphy 0-1, G Cahill 0-1, B Whelehan 0-1, D Regan 0-1.		K Flannery 2-1, M Conneely 0-5, P Mulhaire 1-1, S White 0-1.

16 October 1994 Semi-final	Seir Kieran	3-13 - 0-08	Kilcormac–Killoughey	St Brendan's Park
	B Dooley 2-3, M Coughlan 1-2, Johnny Dooley 0-4, Joe Dooley 0-2, A O'Neill 0-2.		D Owens 0-3, N Hand 0-2 S Spain 0-1, J Kilmartin 0-1, G Gleeson 0-1.

=== Final ===
30 October 1994 Final	Birr	0-08 - 0-06	Seir Kieran	St Brendan's Park
	A Cahill 0-4, O O'Neill 0-1, D Pilkington 0-1, C McGlone 0-1.		Johnny Dooley 0-2, M Coughlan 0-2, Joe Dooley 0-1, B Dooley 0-1.
