= Johnny Pilkington =

Irish hurler (born 1970)

Personal information
- Native name: Seán Pilineach (Irish)
- Born: 31 July 1971 (age 55) Birr, County Offaly, Ireland
- Occupations: Publican and grocer

Sport
- Sport: Hurling
- Position: Midfield
Club
- Years: Club
- Birr
Club titles
- Offaly titles: 8
- Leinster titles: 6
- All-Ireland Titles: 4
Inter-county
Years	County	Apps (scores)
1988–2001	Offaly	41 (6–56)
Inter-county titles
- Leinster titles: 4
- All-Irelands: 2
- NHL: 1
- All Stars: 1

Johnny Pilkington (born 31 July 1970) is an Irish former hurler who played as a right wing-forward for the Offaly senior hurling team.

Pilkington made his first appearance for the team during the 1988–89 National League and subsequently became a regular member of the starting fifteen until his retirement after the 2001 championship. During that time he won two All-Ireland medals, four Leinster, one National Hurling League medal and one All-Star award. Pilkington was an All-Ireland runner-up on two occasions.

At club level Pilkington is one of only a handful of players to have won four All-Ireland medals. In addition to this he has also won six Leinster medals and eight county club championship medals with Birr.

Pilkington's older brother, Declan, also played hurling with Offaly.

== Playing career ==
=== Club ===
Pilkington played his club hurling with Birr and enjoyed much success in a lengthy career. After enjoying some success at underage levels, he subsequently joined the Birr senior hurling team.

Having lost the championship decider in 1990, Birr bounced back the following year by reaching the final again. A 1–12 to 1–11 defeat of Seir Kieran gave Pilkington his first championship medal. It was Birr's first county title in twenty years. Pilkington later collected a Leinster medal following a 2–14 to 0–3 thrashing of Ballyhale Shamrocks. The subsequent All-Ireland final saw Birr take on Kiltormer of Galway, however, a 0–15 to 1–8 defeat was Pilkington's lot on that occasion.

After a number of years without success, Birr returned to the big time in 1994. A narrow 0–8 to 0–6 defeat of Seir Kieran gave Pilkington a second championship medal. He later won a second Leinster medal following a defeat of Oulart the Ballagh before lining out in a second All-Ireland final. Dunloy of Antrim were the opponents and provided stiff opposition to a Birr team who were lucky to escape with a 0–9 apiece draw. The replay was much more conclusive with Birr recording a 3–13 to 2–3 win. It was Pilkington's first All-Ireland medal.

In 1997 Pilkington won a third county championship medal following another 0–14 to 2–4 defeat of Seir Kieran. He later added a third Leinster medal to his collection following an 0–11 to 0–5 defeat of Castletown. The subsequent All-Ireland final saw Birr take on Sarsfield's of Galway. Darren Hanniffy scored the only goal of the game after just five minutes and gave Birr a lead that they would never surrender. A 1–13 to 0–9 victory gave Pilkington his second All-Ireland medal.

After surrendering their titles the following year, Birr bounced back in 1999. A 3–15 to 1–11 defeat of St. Rynagh's gave Pilkington a fourth championship medal. A subsequent 1–16 to 0–11 defeat of Castletown gave Pilkington a fourth Leinster medal.

Pilington won further championship medals in 2000 and 2001 as Birr retained their status as the kingpins of Offaly hurling. Once again Birr defeated Castletown in the provincial decider to give Pilkington his fifth Leinster medal. Once again Birr qualified for the All-Ireland final with Clarinbridge providing the opposition. A Declan Pilkington goal inside sixty seconds was the perfect start, although the Westerners did recover to lead by 1–4 to 1 -2 at the break. With wind advantage, Birr took control and secured a 2–10 to 1–5 victory. It was Pilkington's third All-Ireland medal.

Birr continued their dominance in 2002 with Pilkington winning a seventh championship medal following a 3–12 to 2–7 defeat of Kilcormac-Killoughey. He later added a sixth Leinster medal to his collection following a 2–5 to 1–2 defeat of Young Irelands in deplorable conditions. Birr later faced Dunloy in the All-Ireland decider. At the third time of asking Birr finally retained the title with a 1–19 to 0–11 victory. It was Pilkington's record-breaking fourth All-Ireland medal.

In 2003 Birr defeated Ballyskenach by 1–18 to 1–11 to secure their fifth successive county championship. It was Pilkington's eighth and final championship medal.

=== Inter-county ===
Pilkington first came to prominence on the inter-county scene as a member of the Offaly minor hurling team in 1987. He won a Leinster medal that year following 1 2–13 to 0–12 defeat of Kilkenny before later lining out in the All-Ireland final. Tipperary provided the opposition on that occasion, however, 2–8 to 0–12 score line gave Pilkington an All-Ireland Minor Hurling Championship medal.

Pilkington made his senior debut for Offaly in a National League game against Meath during the 1988–89 campaign. He later lined out in his first championship game against Laois before winning his first Leinster medal following a 3–15 to 4–9 defeat of Kilkenny. Antrim subsequently pulled off the hurling shock of the century with a 4–15 to 1–15 defeat of Offaly in the All-Ireland semi-final.

Offaly once again dominated the provincial championship in 1990. A 1–19 to 2–11 defeat of Dublin gave Pilkington his second Leinster medal as Offaly completed their first and only hat-trick of provincial titles. The team subsequently faced a third All-Ireland semi-final defeat. He finished off the year by collecting his sole All-Star award.

The success continued in 1991 with Pilkington collecting a National League medal following a 2–6 to 0–10 defeat of Wexford.

In 1994 Offaly returned to the top of the provincial pile. A 1–18 to 0–14 defeat of Wexford gave Pilkington his third Leinster medal. After defeating Galway in the All-Ireland semi-final, he later lined out against Limerick in his first All-Ireland final appearance. With five minutes left in the game Limerick were five points ahead and were coasting to victory. It was then that one of the most explosive All-Ireland final finishes of all-time took place. Offaly were awarded a close-in free which Johnny Dooley stepped up to take. Dooley was told by the management team to take a point; however, he lashed the ball into the Limerick net to reduce the deficit. Following the puck-out Offaly worked the ball up the field and Pat O'Connor struck for a second goal. The Offaly forwards scored another five unanswered points in the time remaining to secure a 3–16 to 2–13 victory. This sensational victory gave Pilkington a first All-Ireland medal.

Offaly retained the Leinster title following a 2–16 to 2–5 trouncing of Kilkenny in 1995. It was Pilkington's fourth provincial medal. Down fell to Offaly in the subsequent All-Ireland semi-final, allowing Offaly to advance to the championship decider and attempt to put back-to-back All-Ireland titles together for the first time ever. It was the first-ever meeting of Offaly and Clare in the history of the championship. The game developed into a close affair with Offaly taking a half-time lead. Four minutes from the end substitute Éamonn Taaffe first timed a long range free straight into the net to give Clare a one-point lead. After a quick equaliser Anthony Daly sent over a 65-metre free to give his team the lead again. Jamesie O'Connor pointed soon afterwards and at the full-time whistle Clare were the 1–13 to 2–8 winners.

After a couple of seasons in the doldrums Offaly emerged again in 1998, however, the year was not without controversy. That year Pilkington's side reached the Leinster final but lost by five points to Kilkenny. This defeat prompted their manager, Babs Keating, to describe the Offaly hurlers as "sheep in a heap", and he promptly resigned. It looked as if Offaly's championship hopes were in disarray, however, they overcame Antrim in the All-Ireland quarter-final and qualified to meet Clare in the semi-final. That game ended in a draw 1–13 apiece draw and had to be replayed. The replay, however, was ended early because of a time-keeping error by the referee Jimmy Cooney. Following a protest on the pitch of Croke Park by the Offaly supporters it was decided that Clare and Offaly would meet for a third time. Pilkington's side won the third game and qualified to play Kilkenny in the final in a repeat of the provincial decider. On that day Brian Whelahan delivered one of his greatest performances. Despite suffering from flu, he started in defence and was later moved to full-forward where he scored 1–6. Offaly reversed the Leinster final defeat by winning the All-Ireland final by six points. Pilkington secured a second All-Ireland medal.

Offaly surrendered their championship crown the following year but returned to the All-Ireland decider again in 2000 in a repeat of the Leinster final. Kilkenny's D.J. Carey capitalised on an Offaly mistake after just six minutes to start a goal-fest for "the Cats". Carey scored 2–4 in all, sharing his second goal with Henry Shefflin who also scored a goal in the second-half. At the full-time whistle Kilkenny were the champions by 5–15 to 1–14.

Following a humiliating 3–21 to 0–18 defeat by Kilkenny in the 2001 Leinster semi-final, Pilkington announced his retirement from inter-county hurling.

== Managerial career ==
=== Offaly minor ===
Pilkington succeeded Ger Coughlan as Offaly minor hurling team manager in late 2007. During his two seasons in charge he enjoyed little success. His opening game in 2008 saw Offaly face a comprehensive defeat by Carlow, while Westmeath got the better of Pilkington's charges in 2009.

=== Kilcormac-Killoughey ===
Pilkington was appointed manager of the Kilcormac-Killoughey senior hurling team in late 2008. In his debut season in charge he guided the team to the championship decider. A 2–12 to 0–11 defeat was Pilkington's lot on that occasion. Kilcormac-Killoughey were defeated by the same opposition in controversial circumstances at the semi-final stages of the championship in 2010.

== Honours ==
=== Team ===
Birr

- All-Ireland Senior Club Hurling Championship (4): 1995, 1998, 2002, 2003
- Leinster Senior Club Hurling Championship (6): 1991, 1994, 1997, 1999, 2001, 2002
- Offaly Senior Hurling Championship (8): 1991, 1994, 1997, 1999, 2000, 2001, 2002, 2003

Offaly

- All-Ireland Senior Hurling Championship (2): 1994, 1998
- Leinster Senior Hurling Championship (4): 1989, 1990, 1994, 1995
- National Hurling League (1): 1990–91
- Walsh Cup (3): 1990, 1993, 1994
- Leinster Under-21 Hurling Championship (3): 1989, 1991, 1992
- Leinster Minor Hurling Championship (1): 1987
- All-Ireland Minor Hurling Championship (1): 1987

=== Individual ===
Awards

- All-Stars (1): 1990

Sporting positions
Preceded by Martin Hanamy	Offaly Senior Hurling Captain; 1995	Succeeded by Shane McGuckin
Preceded by Ger Coughlan	Offaly Minor Hurling Manager; 2007–2009	Succeeded by Joe Cleary
