= 1997–98 All-Ireland Senior Club Hurling Championship =

All-Ireland Senior Club Hurling Championship 1997–98
Championship Details
- Dates: 21 September 1997 – 17 March 1998
- Teams: 28

All Ireland Champions
- Winners: Birr (2nd win)
- Captain: Joe Errity
- Manager: Pad Joe Whelahan

All Ireland Runners-up
- Runners-up: Sarsfields
- Captain: Pádraig Kelly

Provincial Champions
- Munster: Clarecastle
- Leinster: Birr
- Ulster: Dunloy
- Connacht: Sarsfields

Championship Statistics
- Matches Played: 31
- Top Scorer: Ken Ralph (4–28)

The 1997–98 All-Ireland Senior Club Hurling Championship was the 28th staging of the All-Ireland Senior Club Hurling Championship, the Gaelic Athletic Association's premier inter-county club hurling tournament. The championship ran from 21 September 1997 to 17 March 1998.

Wolfe Tones na Sionna of Clare were the defending champions, however, they failed to qualify after being beaten by Sixmilebridge in the quarter-finals of the 1996 Clare SHC. Dunnamaggin of Kilkenny and Sarsfields of Cork made their championship debuts.

The All-Ireland final was played at Croke Park in Dublin on 17 March 1998, between Birr of Offaly and Sarsfields of Galway, in what was a first championship meeting between the teams. Birr won the match by 1–13 to 0–09 to claim a second title.

Clarecastle's Ken Ralph was the championship's top scorer with 4–28.

== Results ==
=== Connacht Senior Club Hurling Championship ===
First round

4 October 1997 First round	St. Mary's	1–10 – 1–04	Tubbercurry	Kilcoyne Park, Tubbercurry
	B Beirne 0–6, D O'Grady 1–0, B Whelan 0–2, B Carroll 0–1, P Carroll 0–1.		M Gorman 1–0, K Killeen 0–2, R Brennan 0–1, E Morley 0–1.

Second round

18 October 1997 Second round	St. Mary's	1–04 – 2–13	Tooreen	Aghamore
	B Beirne 0–2, J Keane 0–1, D O'Grady 0–1.		Dom Greally 0–6, A Hession 1–1, Declan Greally 1–0, N Delaney 1–0 (og), J Cunnane 0–2, R Robinson 0–1, R Delaney 0–1, F Delaney 0–1, K Greally 0–1.	Referee: D McDermott (Roscommon)

Semi-final

1 November 1997 Semi-final	Four Roads	0–15 – 1–14	Tooreen	Ballyforan
	J Mannion 0–8, R Mulry 0–2, F Grehan 0–2, M Cunniffe 0–1, P Mannion 0–1, D Lohan 0–1.		Dom Greally 1–10, M Trench 0–1, A Heesion 0–1, J Cunnane 0–1, J Henry 0–1.	Referee: M Bodkin (Galway)

Final

6 December 1997 Final	Sarsfields	5–15 – 1–05	Tooreen	Peadar Early Memorial Park
	J Cooney 2–3, A Donohue 1–6, J McGrath 1–2, P Cooney 1–0, N Morrissey 0–2, M Ward 0–1, P Kelly 0–1.		A Hession 1–0, D Greally 0–3, G Glavey 0–1, F Delaney 0–1.

=== Leinster Senior Club Hurling Championship ===
First round

19 October 1997 First round	Naomh Moninne	0–09 – 2–15	St. Mullin's	Dundalk
	D Dunne 0–4, P Dunne 0–1, J Temple 0–1, C Connolly 0–1, J Kennedy 0–1, A Hoey 0–1.		P Coady 0–10, P Murphy 1–1, M Ryan 1–0, J McDonnell 0–2, D Doyle 0–2.

25 October 1997 First round	Naas	5–24 – 0–09	Longford Slashers	Sallins Road, Naas
	M Hennessy 2–4, J Brennan 1–5, J Kinlon 2–1, M Boran 0–6, E Denieff 0–4, B McGovern 0–1, R Coyle 0–1, B Behan 0–1, L Moloney 0–1.		J McDermott 0–7, G Ghee 0–1, B O'Connor 0–1.

25 October 1997 First round	Rathmolyon	0–08 – 1–10	Kiltegan	St. Loman's Park, Trim
	J Gorry 0–4, N Cole 0–1, M Cole 0–1, D Tuile 0–1, S Ennis 0–1.		J Keogh 1–6, S Byrne 0–2, G Wynne 0–1, M Cullen 0–1.

26 October 1997 First round	Castletown	3–17 – 2–10	Lough Lene Gaels	Kelly Daly Park, Rathdowney
	P Phelan 1–3, D Cuddy 0–6, J O'Sullivan 1–1, F O'Sullivan 0–4, M O'Sullivan 1–0, P Cuddy 0–3.		P Williams 0–4, C Murtagh 0–4, M Williams 1–0, A Murray 1–0, G Briordy 0–1, J Williams.

Quarter-finals

1 November 1997 Quarter-final	Castletown	0–17 – 1–14	Oulart-the Ballagh	Kelly Daly Park, Rathdowney
	P Phelan 0–6, F O'Sullivan 0–4, D Cuddy 0–3, J O'Sullivan 0–2, Paul Cuddy 0–1, Paudge Cuddy 0–1.		P Finn 0–6, D O'Connor 1–0, P Redmond 0–3, J Mythen 0–2, M Storey 0–1, L Dunne 0–1, P Rossiter 0–1.

2 November 1997 Quarter-final	Kiltegan	1–06 – 3–15	Birr	Pearse Park, Arklow
	J Keogh 0–4, N Cremin 1–0, K Furlong 0–2.		D Pilkington 3–0, G Cahill 0–5, P Carroll 0–3, D Regan 0–3, D Hanniffy 0–2, S Whelehan 0–1, J Pilkington 0–1.	Referee: P Neary (Kilkenny)

2 November 1997 Quarter-final	St. Mullin's	0–13 – 4–15	O'Toole's	Dr. Cullen Park, Carlow
	P Coady 0–6, D Doyle 0–3, P Murphy 0–2, D Kavanagh 0–1, S Gahan 0–1.		J Brennan 1–9, É Morrissey 1–4, K Horgan 1–1, P Donoghue 1–0, J Morris 0–1.	Referee: P Moran (Westmeath)

2 November 1997 Quarter-final	Naas	1–06 – 1–11	Dunnamaggin	Sallins Road, Naas
	J Kinlon 1–2, T Shanahan 0–3, C Boran 0–1.		M Moran 0–7, K O'Shea 1–0, S Ryan 0–3, E Kennedy 0–1.	Referee: C Byrne (Wicklow)

8 November 1997 Quarter-final replay	Oulart-the Ballagh	0–10 – 1–08	Castletown	Bellefield, Enniscorthy
	P Finn 0–4, S Dunne 0–2, M Storey 0–2, D O'Connor 0–1, P Redmond 0–1.		P Phelan 1–5, D Cuddy 0–2, E Kirwan 0–1.	Referee: P Dunphy (Kilkenny)

Semi-finals

16 November 1997 Semi-final	Castletown	3–08 – 2–09	O'Toole's	Nowlan Park, Kilkenny
	D Cuddy 1–5, P Phelan 1–1, M Cuddy 1–0, Paul Cuddy 0–2.		K Flynn 2–0, J Brennan 0–6, J Morris 0–1, P Donohue 0–1, D Hernon 0–1.	Referee: P Horan (Offaly)

16 November 1997 Semi-final	Birr	1–19 – 1–07	Dunnamaggin	O'Moore Park, Portlaoise
	G Cahill 0–6, P Carroll 0–5, Brian Whelehan 1–1, D Hanniffy 0–3, D Pilkington 0–3, J Pilkington 0–1.		M Moran 0–6, James Hickey 1–0, S Ryan 0–1.	Referee: P Ahearne (Carlow)

Final

30 November 1997 Final	Birr	0–11 – 0–05	Castletown	Nowlan Park, Kilkenny
	G Cahill 0–4, D Hanniffy 0–2, D Pilkington 0–2, C Hanniffy 0–1, P Carroll 0–1, L Power 0–1.		David Cuddy 0–2, Cyril Cuddy 0–1, Patrick Phelan 0–1, F O'Sullivan 0–1.	Referee: P Neary (Kilkenny)

=== Munster Senior Club Hurling Championship ===
Quarter-finals

26 October 1997 Quarter-final	Ballyheigue	1–09 – 1–13	Patrickswell	John Joe O'Sullivan Park, Ballyheigue
	B O'Sullivan 0–5, J Lucid 1–1, M Slattery 0–2, WJ Lean 0–1.		G Kirby 1–10, K Carey 0–2, B Foley 0–1.	Referee: S McMahon (Clare)

26 October 1997 Quarter-final	Sarsfields	1–13 – 1–13	Ballygunner	Páirc Uí Chaoimh, Cork
	P Ryan 0–7, J Murphy 1–2, T McCarthy 0–1, T Óg Lynch 0–1, J Barry 0–1, G Murphy 0–1.		P Power 1–4, T Carroll 0–2, L Whitty 0–2, M O'Mahony 0–2, F Hartley 0–1, T Fives 0–1, B O'Sullivan 0–1.

9 November 1997 Quarter-final replay	Ballygunner	3–11 – 2–07	Sarsfields	Walsh Park, Waterford
	P Flynn 2–3, T Carroll 0–4, M Mahony 1–0, B O'Sullivan 0–2, L Whitty 0–1, P Power 0–1.		P Ryan 2–4, P Gahan 0–1, J Murphy 0–1, T McCarthy 0–1.	Referee: W Barrett (Tipperary)

Semi-finals

16 November 1997 Semi-final	Patrickswell	0–18 – 0–14	Clonoulty-Rossmore	Gaelic Grounds, Limerick
	G Kirby 0–8, A Carmody 0–4, D O'Grady 0–4, B Foley 0–1, E Geary 0–1.		M Kennedy 0–7, D Ryan 0–4, M Quirke 0–1, A Butler 0–1, K Ryan 0–1.	Referee: W Horgan (Cork)

30 November 1997 Semi-final	Clarecastle	1–16 – 0–16	Ballygunner	Semple Stadium
	K Ralph 1–7, A Neville 0–3, G O'Loughlin 0–2, F Tuohy 0–2, J Healy 0–1, R Fitzgerald 0–1.		P Flynn 0–6, B O'Sullivan 0–4, T Carroll 0–2, M O'Mahony 0–1, P Power 0–1, C Sweeney 0–1, D O'Sullivan 0–1.	Referee: J McDonnell (Tipperary)

Final

7 December 1997 Final	Clarecastle	2–11 – 0–15	Patrickswell	Semple Stadium, Thurles
	K Ralph 1–4, A Neville 1–1, D Scanlan 0–4, P Healy 0–2.		G Kirby 0–11, D O'Grady 0–2, J McDermott 0–1, B Foley 0–1.	Referee: M Wadding (Waterford)

=== Ulster Senior Club Hurling Championship ===
Semi-finals

21 September 1997 Semi-final	Keady Lámh Dhearg	0–10 – 3–17	Lavey	Athletic Grounds, Armagh
	G Mone 0–3, K Hatzer 0–2, V Mone 0–2, K Mone 0–1, G Enright 0–1, E McKee 0–1.		M McCormack 1–5, F McNally 1–3, H Downey 1–1, O Collins 0–4, B McCormack 0–2, J McGurk 0–1, S Downey 0–1.

21 September 1997 Semi-final	Dunloy	1–15 – 1–08	Ballygalget	Casement Park, Belfast
	G O'Kane 1–7, A Elliott 0–3, L Richmond 0–3, M Molloy 0–1, C McGuckian 0–1, J Elliott 0–1.		G Clarke 1–1, J McGrattan 0–4, C McGrattan 0–1, B Coulter 0–1, B Savage 0–1.

Final

5 October 1997 Final	Dunloy	3–16 – 4–10	Lavey	Casement Park, Belfast
	G O'Kane 1–8, A Elliott 1–1, J Elliott 0–4, L Richmond 1–0, T McGrath 0–2, N Elliott 0–1.		O Collins 2–4, P McCoy 1–0, F McNally 1–0, A McCrystal 0–2, B McCormack 0–2, M McCormack 0–2, M Collins 0–1.	Referee: JA Gribben (Down)

=== All-Ireland Senior Club Hurling Championship ===
Quarter-final

14 December 1997 Quarter-final	St. Gabriel's	1–07 – 2–24	Clarecastle	Emerald GAA Grounds, Ruislip
	A Burke 1–1, R Murphy 0–3 (0–1 free, 0–1 65), D Murphy 0–2, D Quinlan 0–1.		K Ralph 1–8 (0–1 free), F Tuohy 0–6, A Neville 1–0, D Scanlon 0–3, P Healy 0–2 (0–1 65, 0–1 free), G O'Loughlin 0–2, A Daly, R Fitzgerald, 0–1 each.	Referee: T McIntyre (Antrim)

Semi-final

15 February 1998 Semi-final	Birr	1–15 – 3–09	Clarecastle	Semple Stadium, Thurles
	G Cahill 0–6, D Pilkington 1–1, G Hanniffy 0–2, D Hanniffy 0–2, J Pilkington 0–1, L Power 0–1, P Carroll 0–1, O O'Neill 0–1.		D Scanlan 2–3, K Ralph 1–4, F Tuohy 0–1, G O'Loughlin 0–1.	Referee: W Barrett (Tipperary)

15 February 1998 Semi-final	Sarsfields	3–14 – 4–11	Dunloy	Cusack Park, Mullingar
	A Donohue 1–10, P Kelly 2–1, J McGrath 0–1, P Forde 0–1, P Cooney 0–1.		G O'Kane 1–6, A Elliot 2–0, T McGrath 1–1, J Elliot 0–2, N Elliot 0–1, C McGuckian 0–1.	Referee: P O'Connor (Limerick)

28 February 1998 Semi-final replay	Birr	0–12 – 0–11 (aet)	Clarecastle	Semple Stadium, Thurles
	G Cahill 0–4, D Hanniffy 0–4, D Regan 0–2, Brian Whelehan 0–1, J Pilkington 0–1.		K Ralph 0–5, G O'Loughlin 0–2, A Neville 0–1, D Scanlan 0–1, A Daly 0–1, P Healy 0–1.	Attendance: 5,050; Referee: W Barrett (Tipperary)

1 March 1998 Semi-final replay	Sarsfields	1–15 – 1–11	Dunloy	Cusack Park, Mullingar
	A Donohue 0–6, M McGrath 1–1, P Kelly 0–2, J Cooney 0–2, P Forde 0–1, M Stratford 0–1, J McGrath 0–1, N Morrissey 0–1.		Gregory O'Kane 0–7, A Elliott 1–2, M Molloy 0–1, Gary O'Kane 0–1.	Referee: P O'Connor (Limerick)

Final

17 March 1998 Final	Birr	1–13 – 0–09	Sarsfields	Croke Park, Dublin
14:00	D Hanniffy 1–3, G Cahill 0–3, D Pilkington 0–2, J Pilkington 0–2, Daithí Regan 0–1, Barry Whelehan 0–1, C McGlone 0–1.		A Donohue 0–6, Peter Kelly 0–2, J McGrath 0–1.	Referee: W Barrett (Tipperary)

== Championship Statistics ==
=== Scoring ===
Top scorers overall

Rank	Player	Club	Tally	Total	Matches	Average
1	Ken Ralph	Clarecastle	4–28	40	5	8.00
2	Gregory O'Kane	Dunloy	3–28	37	4	9.25
3	Aidan Donohue	Sarsfields	2–28	34	4	8.50
4	Gary Kirby	Patrickswell	1–29	32	3	10.66
5	Gary Cahill	Birr	0–28	28	6	4.66
6	Dom Greally	Tooreen	1–19	22	3	7.33
7	Declan Pilkington	Birr	4-08	20	6	3.33
8	Darren Hanniffy	Birr	1–16	19	6	3.16
9	Alistair Elliott	Dunloy	4-06	18	4	4.50
9	Jamesie Brennan	O'Toole's	1–15	18	2	9.00
10	Pat Ryan	Sarsfields	2–11	17	2	8.50

Top scorers in a single game

Rank	Player	Club	Tally	Total	Opposition
1	Dom Greally	Tooreen	1–10	13	Four Roads Hurling Club
1	Gary Kirby	Patrickswell	1–10	13	Ballyheigue
1	Aidan Donohue	Sarsfields	1–10	13	Dunloy
2	Jamesie Brennan	O'Toole's	1-09	12	St. Mullin's
3	Gregory O'Kane	Dunloy	1-08	11	Lavey
3	Ken Ralph	Clarecastle	1-08	11	St. Gabriel's
3	Gary Kirby	Patrickswell	0–11	11	Clarecastle
4	Mark Hennessy	Naas	2-04	10	Longford Slashers
4	Pat Ryan	Sarsfields	2-04	10	Ballygunner
4	Ollie Collins	Lavey	2-04	10	Dunloy
4	Gregory O'Kane	Dunloy	1-07	10	Ballygalget
4	Ken Ralph	Clarecastle	1-07	10	Ballygunner
4	Pat Coady	St. Mullin's	0–10	10	Naomh Moninne
