= 1997 Offaly Senior Hurling Championship =

Annual hurling competition season

- Champions: Birr (13th title); Joe Errity (captain)
- Runners-up: Seir Kieran; Johnny Dooley (captain)

The 1997 Offaly Senior Hurling Championship was the 100th staging of the Offaly Senior Hurling Championship since its establishment by the Offaly County Board in 1896.

Seir Kieran were the defending champions.

The final was played on 5 October 1997 at St Brendan's Park in Birr, between Birr and Seir Kieran, in what was their third meeting in the final overall and a first meeting in the final in three years. Birr won the match by 0–14 to 2–04 to claim their 13th championship title overall and a first title in three years.

== Results ==
=== Semi-finals ===
21 September 1997 Semi-final	Seir Kieran	2-15 - 2-10	Tullamore	St Brendan's Park
	K Kealey 1-3, Johnny Dooley 0-6, B Dooley 1-1, Joe Dooley 0-2, M Mulrooney 0-2, K Dooley 0-1.		K Martin 0-7, A Lawlor 1-0, M Gallagher 1-0, R Martin 0-1, E Finnerty 0-1, P Cleary 0-1.

21 September 1997 Semi-final	Birr	1-14 - 1-06	Lusmagh	St Brendan's Park
	O O'Neill 1-4, G Cahill 0-5, P Carroll 0-2, D Pilkington 0-2, D Hanniffy 0-1.		J Kelly 1-0, B Troy 0-3, John Troy 0-2, D Kelly 0-1.

=== Final ===
5 October 1997 Final	Birr	0-13 - 2-04	Seir Kieran	St Brendan's Park
	G Cahill 0-6, D Hanniffy 0-2, Barry Whelehan 0-1, Brian Whelehan 0-1, P Carroll 0-1, M Claffey 0-1, D Pilkington 0-1.		Johnny Dooley 1-2, B Dooley 1-0, M Mulrooney 0-1, K Kealy 0-1.
