= 1999 Offaly Senior Hurling Championship =

Annual hurling competition season

- Champions: Birr (14th title); Declan Pilkington (captain); Pad Joe Whelehan (manager)
- Runners-up: St Rynagh's; Paudie Mulhare (captain); Joe Tynan (manager)

The 1999 Offaly Senior Hurling Championship was the 102nd staging of the Offaly Senior Hurling Championship since its establishment by the Offaly County Board in 1896.

Seir Kieran entered the championship as the defending champions, however, they were beaten by Birr in the semi-final.

The final was played on 3 October 1999 at St Brendan's Park in Birr, between Birr and St Rynagh's, in what was their first meeting in the final in six years. Birr won the match by 3–15 to 1–11 to claim their 14th championship title overall and a first title in two years.

== Results ==
=== Semi-finals ===
18 September 1999 Semi-final	St Rynagh's	1-13 - 0-11	Ballyskenagh	St Brendan's Park
	E Martin 1-6, H Rigney 0-1, P Mulhare 0-1, A Kelly 0-1, E Mulhare 0-1, G O'Connor 0-1, M Duignan 0-1, K Flannery 0-1.

18 September 1999 Semi-final	Birr	3-22 - 1-07	Seir Kieran	St Brendan's Park
	S Whelehan 2-3, D Pilkington 0-7, J Pilkington 0-4, O O'Neill 0-3, C McGlone 1-0, Brian Whelehan 0-2, Barry Whelehan 0-1, L Power 0-1, D Hanniffy 0-1.		Johnny Dooley 0-4, E Coughlan 1-0, M Coughlan 0-2, M Mulrooney 0-1.

=== Final ===
3 October 1999 Final	Birr	3-15 - 1-11	St Rynagh's	St Brendan's Park
	S Whelehan 2-2, O O'Neill 1-4, G Hanniffy 0-4, D Pilkington 0-3, Brian Whelehan 0-1, C McGlone 0-1.		E Martin 0-4, G O'Connor 1-0, P Mulhare 0-2, F Dolan 0-2, M Duignan 0-1, H Rigney 0-1, E Mulhare 0-1.
