= 2002–03 All-Ireland Senior Club Hurling Championship =

All-Ireland Senior Club Hurling Championship 2002–2003
Championship Details
- Dates: 20 October 2002 – 17 March 2003
- Teams: 28

All Ireland Champions
- Winners: Birr (4th win)
- Captain: Gary Hanniffy
- Manager: Pat Joe Whelahan

All Ireland Runners-up
- Runners-up: Dunloy
- Captain: Gary O'Kane
- Manager: Seán McLean

Provincial Champions
- Munster: Mount Sion
- Leinster: Birr
- Ulster: Dunloy
- Connacht: Athenry

Championship Statistics
- Matches Played: 28
- Top Scorer: Eugene Cloonan (4–23)

The 2002–03 All-Ireland Senior Club Hurling Championship was the 33rd staging of the All-Ireland Senior Club Hurling Championship, the Gaelic Athletic Association's premier inter-county club hurling tournament. The championship began on 20 October 2002 and ended on 17 March 2002.

Birr were the defending champions.

On 17 March 2003 Birr won the championship following a 1–19 to 0–11 defeat of Dunloy in the All-Ireland final. This was their fourth All-Ireland title and their second title in succession.

Athenry's Eugene Cloonan was the championship's top scorer with 4–23.

== Pre-championship ==
The build-up to the opening of the championship was dominated by Birr and the possibility that they would retain their All-Ireland title and lead the all-time club roll of honour with four championships. Having secured their fourth successive county championship title, Birr were favourites to retain their provincial title for a second year-in-a-row. This would leave them only two wins away from hurling immortality.

== Results ==
=== Connacht Senior Club Hurling Championship ===
Quarter-finals

26 October 2002 Quarter-final	St. Mary's Kiltoghert	1–11 – 2–09	Ballyhaunis	Páirc Seán Mac Diarmada, Carrick
	C Cunniffe 1–7, J Goldrick 0–1, T Loughlin 0–1, D O'Grady 0–1, A O'Shea 0–1.		P Higgins 2–1, F Brown 0–5, K Higgins 0–3.

26 October 2002 Quarter-final	Tubbercurry	1–11 – 2–16	Four Roads	Kilcoyne Park, Tubbercurry
	P Seevers 0–6, J Burke 0–5, R Brennan 1–0.		P Glennon 1–3, M Cunniffe 0–6, T Kelly 1–2, D Lohan 0–5.

Semi-final

3 November 2002 Semi-final	Four Roads	2–12 – 1–08	Ballyhaunis	Ballyforan
	J Mannion (1–5, 2f), B Mannion (1–2), T Kelly (0–2), T Lennon (0–1), L Gately (0–1), D Lohan (0–1).	Report	F Browne (0–5, all frees), K Higgins (1–0), J Powers (0–1, '65), D Walsh (0–1)	Referee: JJ Larkin (Galway)

Final

17 November 2002 Final	Four Roads	0–09 – 1–19	Athenry	Ballyforan
	R Kennedy 0–3, T Lennon, R Mulry (1f) 0–2 each, L Gately, J Mannion (f) 0–1 each.	Report	E Cloonan 0–8 (7f), D Donoghue 1–2, D Moran 0–5, J Rabbitte, J Conway, S Donoghue, C Cloonan 0–1 each.	Referee: J Weldon (Westmeath)

=== Leinster Senior Club Hurling Championship ===
First round

20 October 2002 First round	Pearse Óg	0–05 – 0–08	Kilmessan	Dundalk
	S McDonagh (0–3, 2f), C Lavery (0–1), P Callan (0–1).	Report	N Horan (0–4, 1f); A O'Neill (0–2), P Reynolds (0–1), J McGuinness (0–1).	Referee: D O'Donovan (Dublin)

20 October 2002 First round	Wolfe Tones	0–04 – 1–09	Naas	Pearse Park, Longford
	M Cassidy (0–2, f), S Browne(0–1, f), J Lynn (0–1).	Report	J Kinlin (1–1), D Scallen (0–4, fs), J Brennan (0–2); M Boran (0–1), R Coyle (0–1).	Referee: B Gavin (Offaly)

20 October 2002 First round	St. Mullin's	1–09 – 1–06	Lough Lene Gaels	Dr. Cullen Park, Carlow
	Pat Coady (0–6), M Ryan (1–0), D Doyle (0–1), D Kavanagh (0–1), W Coady (0–1).	Report	M McNichoals (1–3), D Carty (0–2), J Gavigan (0–1).	Referee: A Stapleton (Laois)

20 October 2002 First round	Castletown	2–02 – 0–08	Carnew Emmets	O'Moore Park, Portlaoise
	P Cuddy 1–0, S Lyons 1–0, P Phelan 0–1, T Dooley 0–1.	Report	D Hyland 0–4, J Murphy 0–3, V Munroe 0–1.	Referee: J Kelly (Wexford)

26 October 2002 First round replay	Carnew Emmets	1–09 – 2–13	Castletown	Aughrim County Ground, Aughrim
	J Murphy 0–7, R Doyle 1–0, J Sinnott 0–1, G Doran 0–1.		P Phelan 2–1, S Lyons 0–6, P Cuddy 0–2, J Palmer 0–1, F O'Sullivan 0–1, C Cuddy 0–1, B Ferns 0–1.	Referee: D Murphy (Wexford)

Quarter-finals

3 November 2002 Quarter-final	Kilmessan	0–07 – 3–20	Young Irelands	Páirc Tailteann, Navan
	N Horan 0–4, M Reilly 0–2, S Clynch 0–1.	Report	DJ Carey 2–5, D Carter 1–4, C Carter 0–5, D Carroll 0–3, J Carey, O Carter, P Farrell 0–1 each.	Referee: J Sheridan (Kildare)

3 November 2002 Quarter-final	St. Mullin's	3–10 – 3–07	O'Tooles	Dr. Cullen Park, Carlow
	D Doyle 2–1, Pat Coady 0–7 (0–6 frees), P Kehoe 1–1, Paddy Coady 0–1.	Report	P Pringle 2–1, B McLoughlin 1–1 (1–1 frees), K Flynn (0–1 free), D McLoughlin 0–2 each, K Ryan 0–1.	Referee: J Guinan (Kilkenny)

3 November 2002 Quarter-final	Castletown	1–12 – 2–12	Birr	O'Moore Park, Portlaoise
	S Lyons 1–2 (0–2 fs); Pauric Cuddy 0–3; F O'Sullivan, C Cuddy, P Cuddy (fs) 0–2 each; D Cuddy 0–1.	Report	S Whelahan 0–6 (all fs); P Molloy, D Hayden 1–1 each; G Hanniffy, R Hanniffy, J Pilkington, B Whelahan 0–1 each.	Referee: A Mac Suibhne (Dublin)

3 November 2002 Quarter-final	Naas	0–08 – 1–13	Rathnure	Sallins Road, Naas
	D Scallan (0–6, all frees), A Dowling, R Coyle (0–1 each).	Report	P Codd (0–7, 6f), M Morrissey (0–3), B O'Leary (1–0), T Hogan (0–2), R Codd (0–1).	Referee: J McGrath (Westmeath)

Semi-finals

17 November 2002 Semi-final	Birr	4–21 – 0–08	St. Mullin's	O'Moore Park, Portlaoise
	S Browne, S Whelehan 1–3 each, P Molloy, R Hanniffey 1–1 each, D Pilkington, B Whelehan 0–3 each, P Carroll, J Pilkington 0–2 each, L Power, D Hayden, N Claffey 0–1 each.	Report	Pat Coady 0–6, D Doyle, A Ralph 0–1 each.	Referee: P Neary (Kilkenny)

17 November 2002 Semi-final	Rathnure	0–10 – 0–12	Young Irelands	Wexford Park, Wexford
	P Codd 0–5 (0–2 frees, 0–1 sideline); T Hogan and B O'Leary 0–2 each; M Byrne and N Higgins 0–1 each.	Report	DJ Carey 2–4 (1–3 frees, 0–1 seventy); D Carter 1–1; D Carroll 0–3; C Carter 0–2; J Carey 0–1.	Referee: B Kelly (Westmeath)

Final

1 December 2002 Final	Birr	2–05 – 1–02	Young Irelands	O'Moore Park, Portlaoise
	R Hanniffy 1–2, S Whelahan 1–2 (0–1 free), Barry Whelahan 0–1.	Report	D Carroll 1–0, C Carter 0–1, DJ Carey 0–1 (free).	Referee: D Murphy (Wexford)

=== Munster Senior Club Hurling Championship ===
Quarter-finals

27 October 2002 Quarter-final	Mount Sion	2–13 – 1–13	Adare	Walsh Park, Waterford
	K McGrath (0–8), S Ryan (2–1), M White (0–2), E McGrath (0–1), E Kelly (0–1).	Report	M Foley (1–3), C Fitzgerald (0–6), D Sheehan (0–2), Tony Houlihan (0–1), J Foley (0–1).	Referee: G Harrington (Cork)

10 November 2002 Quarter-final	Blackrock	2–13 – 1–12	Kilmoyley	Páirc Uí Chaoimh, Cork
	B O’Keeffe 1–2; B Hennebry, A Coughlan (frees) 0–4 each; D Cashman 1–0; P Tierney 0–2; L Meaney 0–1.	Report	S Brick 1–10 (1–6 frees); C Walsh, P O’Sullivan 0–1 each.	Referee: W Moore (Waterford)

Semi-finals

17 November 2002 Semi-final	Sixmilebridge	2–13 – 0–15	Blackrock	Cusack Park, Ennis
	N Gilligan 1–2 (0–1 free); J Chaplin 0–4 (0–2 frees, 0–2 65’s); C Crowe 1–1; M Culbert, C Chaplin, A Chaplin, S Fitzpatrick, P Fitzpatrick, A Mulready, 0–1 each.	Report	A Coughlan 0–5 (all frees); D Cashman 1–0; A Browne 0–3; B Hennebry 0–2; L Meaney 0–2; B O’Keeffe, J Young, P Tierney 0–1 each.	Referee: W Barrett (Tipperary)

17 November 2002 Semi-final	Mount Sion	2–12 – 0–15	Mullinahone	Walsh Park, Waterford
	E Kelly 2–1; K McGrath 0–9 (0–5 from frees; 0–1 from 65); M White 0–2.	Report	E Kelly 0–8 (0–6 from frees); P Croke 0–5 (0–3 from frees); B O'Meara and C Arrigan 0–1 each.	Referee: D Richardson (Limerick)

Final

1 December 2002 Final	Mount Sion	0–12 – 0–10	Sixmilebridge	Semple Stadium, Thurles
	K McGrath 0–9 (0–5 frees); M White 0–3.	Report	N Gilligan 0–5 (0–4 frees); C Chaplin 0–2; C Crowe, S Fitzpatrick and P Fitzpatrick 0–1 each.	Referee: W Barrett (Tipperary)

=== Ulster Senior Club Hurling Championship ===
Semi-finals

20 October 2002 Semi-final	Portaferry	2–19 – 3–06	Keady Lámh Dhearg	Casement Park, Belfast
	P Braniff (0–11, 6fs); P Mallon (1–1), N Sands (1–1), G Adair (0–4); G McGrattan (0–2), J Conway (0–1).	Report	M King (2–0), G Enright (1–2, 1f), P McCormick (0–1), F Fullerton (0–1); B McCormick (0–1), C Hatzer (0–1).	Referee: T McIntyre (Antrim)

20 October 2002 Semi-final	Dunloy	1–13 – 0–10	Lavey	Casement Park, Belfast
	G O'Kane (0–7, 5 fs), P Richmond (1–2), C McGuckian (0–2); L Richmond (0–1), D Quinn (0–1).	Report	O Collins (0–8, 6 fs), H Downey (0–1); P Hearty (0–1).	Referee: G Devlin (Armagh)

Final

26 October 2002 Final	Dunloy	0–12 – 1–06	Portaferry	Fr. Healy Park, Loughguile
	Greg O'Kane (0–7, fs), M Curry (0–2), L Richmond (0–1), A Elliott (0–1), P Richmond (0–1).	Report	P Braniff (0–4, fs); N Sands (1–0), E Trainor (0–1), B Braniff (0–1).

=== All-Ireland Senior Club Hurling Championship ===
Quarter-final

24 November 2002 Quarter-final	Seán Treacy's	0–05 – 4–15	Athenry	Emerald GAA Grounds, Ruislip
	T Moloney (0–5).	Report	E Cloonan (4–10), J Rabbitte (0–2), S Donoghue (0–1), B Hanley (0–1); D Donoghue (0–1).	Referee: S McMahon (Clare)

Semi-finals

16 February 2003 Semi-final	Dunloy	1–14 – 1–13	Mount Sion	Cusack Park, Mullingar
	A Elliott (0–5, 0–3 frees); P Richmond (1–1); C Cunning (0–2); G O’Kane (0–2); L Richmond, N Elliott, M Curry, C McGuckian (0–1) each.	Report	K McGrath (0–5, frees); M White (1–2); M Frisby (0–2); E McGrath, S Ryan E Kelly, J Meaney (0–1) each.	Referee: P Neary (Kilkenny)

16 February 2003 Semi-final	Birr	0–15 – 0–06	Athenry	Cusack Park, Ennis
	S Whelahan 0–7 (0–6 frees); G Hanniffy 0–3; D Pilkington 0–2; B Whelahan 0–2 (65's); P Molloy 0–1.	Report	E Cloonan 0–5 (0–3 frees); D Moran 0–1.	Referee: S Roche (Tipperary)

Final

17 March 2003 Final	Birr	1–19 – 0–11	Dunloy	Croke Park, Dublin
	S Whelehan 0–8 (0–7 frees); D Pilkington 1–2; G Hanniffy, R Hanniffy, P Molloy, S Browne, 0–2 each; Brian Whelehan 0–1 (65).	Report	Greg O'Kane 0–5 (0–3 frees); A Elliott 0–3 (0–2 frees); P Richmond 0–2; M Curry 0–1.	Referee: S McMahon (Clare)

== Championship statistics ==
=== Scoring statistics ===
Overall

Rank	Player	Club	Tally	Total	Matches	Average
1	Eugene Cloonan	Athenry	4–23	35	3	10.66
2	Simon Whelehan	Birr	2–26	32	5	6.40
3	Ken McGrath	Mount Sion	0–31	31	4	7.75
4	D. J. Carey	Young Irelands	4–10	22	3	7.33
5	Gregory O'Kane	Dunloy	0–21	21	4	5.25
6	Pat Coady	St. Mullin's	0–19	19	3	6.33
7	Paul Braniff	Portaferry	0–15	15	2	7.50
8	Séamus Lyons	Castletown	2-08	14	3	4.66
9	Shane Brick	Kilmoyley	1–10	13	1	13.00
10	Rory Hanniffy	Birr	2-06	12	5	2.40
10	Paul Codd	Rathnure	0–12	12	2	6.00

Single game

Rank	Player	Club	Tally	Total	Opposition
1	Eugene Cloonan	Athenry	4–10	22	Seán Treacy's
2	Shane Brick	Kilmoyley	1–10	13	Blackrock
3	D. J. Carey	Young Irelands	2-05	11	Kilmessan
3	Paul Braniff	Portaferry	0–11	11	Keady Lámh Dhearg
4	D. J. Carey	Young Irelands	2-04	10	Rathnure
5	Ken McGrath	Mount Sion	0-09	9	Mullinahone
5	Ken McGrath	Mount Sion	0-09	9	Sixmilebridge
6	Joe Mannion	Four Roads	1-05	8	Ballyhaunis
6	Eugene Cloonan	Athenry	0-08	8	Four Roads
6	Ken McGrath	Mount Sion	0-08	8	Adare
6	Eoin Kelly	Mullinahone	0-08	8	Mount Sion
6	Ollie Collins	Lavey	0-08	8	Dunloy
6	Simon Whelehan	Birr	0-08	8	Dunloy

=== Miscellaneous ===
- St. Mullin's qualified for the Leinster semi-finals for only the second time in their history.
- Birr inscribed their names into the GAA's history books by becoming the first club to win four All-Ireland titles.
