= 1991–92 All-Ireland Senior Club Hurling Championship =

Hurling sports competition held in 1991–92

All-Ireland Senior Club Hurling Championship 1991–92
Championship Details
- Dates: 18 August 1991 – 29 March 1992
- Teams: 33

All Ireland Champions
- Winners: Kiltormer (1st win)
- Captain: Aidan Staunton
- Manager: John Goode

All Ireland Runners-up
- Runners-up: Birr
- Captain: Brian Whelehan
- Manager: Pad Joe Whelehan

Provincial Champions
- Munster: Cashel King Cormacs
- Leinster: Birr
- Ulster: Ruairí Óg
- Connacht: Kiltormer

Championship Statistics
- Matches Played: 30
- Total Goals: 88 (2.93 per game)
- Total Points: 531 (17.70 per game)
- Top Scorer: Tommy Grogan (1–35)

The 1991–92 All-Ireland Senior Club Hurling Championship was the 22nd staging of the All-Ireland Senior Club Hurling Championship, the Gaelic Athletic Association's premier inter-county club hurling tournament. The championship ran from 18 August 1991 to 29 March 1992.

Glenmore were the defending champions, however, they failed to qualify after being beaten by St Martin's in the 1991 Kilkenny SHC semi-finals. Cashel King Cormacs, Lismore and Moorefield made their championship debuts, while Birr returned after a long absence.

The All-Ireland final was played at Semple Stadium in Thurles on 29 March 1992, between Kiltormer of Galway and Birr of Offaly, in what was a first championship meeting between the teams. Kiltormer won the match by 0–15 to 1–08 to claim a first title.

Tommy Grogan, from the Cashel King Cormacs club, was the championship's top scorer with 1–35.

== Connacht Senior Club Hurling Championship ==
=== Connacht first round ===
29 September 1991 First round	Tourlestrane	1–05 – 2–06	Gortletteragh	Tourlestrane Grounds
	W Kavanagh 1-1.		S Quinn 1-0, N Ward 1-0, T Ward 0-1, T McLaughin 0-1, G Dorrigan 0-1, N Ward 0-1, P Logan 0-1, S Heslin 0-1.

=== Connacht quarter-final ===
6 October 1991 Quarter-final	Tooreen	2–15 – 1–09	Gortletteragh	Ballyhaunis Grounds
	J Henry 1-10, T Henry 1-0, D Greally 0-2, J Cunnane 0-1, D Greally 0-1, F Delaney 0-1.		S Duignan 1-1, S Heslin 0-4, T Doorigan 0-2, T McLoughlin 0-2.

=== Connacht semi-final ===
13 October 1991 Semi-final	Tooreen	0–05 – 0–09	Four Roads	Ballyhaunis Grounds
	J Henry 0-3, J Cunnane 0-1, R Delaney 0-1.		D Coyle 0-6, J Mannion 0-1, P Dolan 0-1, G Coyle 0-1.

=== Connacht final ===
10 November 1991 Final	Four Roads	1–06 – 2–09	Kiltormer	Páirc Naomh Aodáin
	D Coyle 1-0, M Cunniffe 0-2, Paddy Dolan 0-2, Paul Dolan 0-2.		J Campbell 1-1, M Staunton 1-0, D Curley 0-3, T Kilkenny 0-2, C Hayes 0-1, O Kilkenny 0-1, D Cox 0-1.

== Leinster Senior Club Hurling Championship ==
=== Leinster first round ===
12 October 1991 First round	Wolfe Tones	1–02 – 4–16	Carnew Emmets	Platin Road
			E Brennan 2-1, D Myers 1-4, J Molloy 1-2, G Murphy 0-2, D Hyland 0-2, D Browne 0-2, JJ Myers 0-1, P Doyle 0-1, J Doyle 0-1.

12 October 1991 First round	Kilmessan	0–10 – 0–11	Brownstown	St Loman's Park
	A O'Neill 0–3, E O'Neill 0–2, P Donnelly 0–1, B O'Reilly 0–1, J Smith 0–1, P Blake 0–1, W Donnelly 0–1.		P Clancy 0–8, J Leonard 0–1, A Clancy 0–1, M Daly 0–1.	Referee: R Maher (Dublin)

13 October 1991 First round	Naomh Eoin	0–07 – 5–05	Portlaoise	Dr Cullen Park
	M Slye 0–4, J Slye 0–3.		M Cashin 2–0, P Bergin 1–3, P Critchley 1–0, S Plunkett 1–0, L Bergin 0–1, T Fitzpatrick 0–1.

26 October 1991 First round	Slasher Gaels	2–10 – 3–07	Moorefield	Michael Fay Park
	N Daly 0–5, D Sheridan 1–1, J Finucane 1–1, R Stakelum 0–2, M Jennings 0–1.		L Murray 2–1, M Deely 1–0, P Hayden 0–2, T McMullen 0–2, M Moloney 0–2.	Referee: T O'Dowd (Mullingar)

2 November 1991 First round replay	Slasher Gaels	0–03 – 3–07	Moorefield	Michael Fay Park
			M Deeley 2–4, N Moore 1–0, T McMullen 0–2, P Hayden 0–1.

=== Leinster quarter-finals ===
27 October 1991 Quarter-final	Brownstown	3–02 – 3–17	Ballyhale Shamrocks	O'Reilly Park
	C Shaw 3–0, P Clancy 0–2.		B Mason 1–3, J Shefflin 1–2, G Fennelly 1–1, L Fennelly 0–3, D Fennelly 0–3, T Shefflin 0–3, J Lawlor 0–1, T Phelan 0–1.

27 October 1991 Quarter-final	Portlaoise	1–04 – 1–12	Buffer's Alley	O'Moore Park
	P Bergin 1–1, L Bergin 0–2, J Taylor 0–1.		P O'Donoghue 0–5, J Gahan 1–1, T Dempsey 0–4, M Foley 0–1, S Whelan 0–1.

9 November 1991 Quarter-final	Carnew Emmets	1–04 – 1–10	Cuala	Pearse Park
	D Myers 1–3, D Hyland 0–1.		M O'Callaghan 1–3, M Morrissey 0–4, M Dempsey 0–1, D Byrne 0–1, M O'Shea 0–1.	Referee: J Denton (Wexford)

10 November 1991 Quarter-final	Moorefield	1–01 – 7–18	Birr	Moorefield Grounds
	J McMullen 0–1, M Moloney 0–1.		N Hogan 2–0, D Regan 2–0, O O'Neill 1–3, J Pilkington 1–2, D Pilkington 0–5, P Murphy 1–0, A Cahill 0–3, J Errity 0–3, B Whelehan 0–1, M Errity 0–1.	Referee: M McCormack (Meath)

=== Leinster semi-finals ===
17 November 1991 Semi-final	Birr	3–06 – 0–05	Buffer's Alley	Nowlan Park
	O O'Neill 1–1, M Hogan 1–0, P Murphy 1–0, D Pilkington 0–3, J Errity 0–1, D Regan 0–1.		T Dempsey 0–3, S O'Leary 0–2.	Referee: T O'Dowd (Westmeath)

17 November 1991 Semi-final	Ballyhale Shamrocks	1–10 – 0–07	Cuala	O'Moore Park
	J Shefflin 1–3, G Fennelly 0–5, L Fennelly 0–1, T Shefflin 0–1.		M Dempsey 0–3, V Holden 0–1, P Nolan 0–1, M Morrissey 0–1, PJ Holden 0–1.	Referee: P Freeney (Kildare)

=== Leinster final ===
24 November 1991 Final	Birr	2–14 – 0–03	Ballyhale Shamrocks	O'Moore Park
	D Pilkington 0–9, R Landy 2–2, P Murphy 0–1, O O'Neill 0–1, J Pilkington 0–1.		L Fennelly 0–1, G Fennelly 0–1, G Mason 0–1.	Referee: P Delaney (Laois)

== Munster Senior Club Hurling Championship ==
=== Munster quarter-finals ===
26 October 1991 Quarter-final	Lismore	5–18 – 0–04	Ballyduff	Castle Grounds
	S Daly 2–4, K O'Gorman 1–3, C Barry 1–1, Seán Prendergast 0–4, D Landers 1–0, B Prendergast 0–3, P Prendergast 0–2, B Lawton 0–1.		J Hennessy 0–4.	Referee: J O'Leary (Cork)

27 October 1991 Quarter-final	Clarecastle	3–15 – 1–05	Ballybrown	Cusack Park
	G O'Loughlin 2–1, A Neville 1–2, J Healy 0–4, V O'Loughlin 0–3, F Twohig 0–2, A Daly 0–2, P Russell 0–1.		C Coughlan 1–0, O O'Connor 0–3, P Davoren 0–2.	Referee: W Barrett (Tipperary)

=== Munster semi-finals ===
17 November 1991 Semi-final	Clarecastle	2–04 – 3–11	Cashel King Cormacs	Cusack Park
	F Tuohy 1–1, A Daly 1–0, J Healy 0–1, P Russell 0–1, A Neville 0–1.		T Grogan 1–9, A Bonnar 1–0, J O'Donoghue 1–0, TJ Connolly 0–1, J Grogan 0–1.	Referee: T Murray (Limerick)

17 November 1991 Semi-final	Midleton	1–08 – 0–10	Lismore	Clonmult Memorial Park
	J Fenton 0–4, M O'Mahony 1–0, V O'Neill 0–2, K Hennessy 0–1, J Roche 0–1.		S Daly 0–3, B Prendergast 0–3, Sean Prendergast 0–2, C Barry 0–1, P Prendergast 0–1.

=== Munster final ===
8 December 1991 Final	Midleton	0–06 – 0–09	Cashel King Cormacs	Mitchelstown Grounds
	J Fenton 0–3, P O'Brien 0–1, K Hennessy 0–1, G Fitzgerald 0–1.		T Grogan 0–4, J Grogan 0–2, J O'Donoghue 0–2, TJ Connolly 0–1.	Referee: M Quinn (Clare)

== Ulster Senior Club Hurling Championship ==
=== Ulster semi-finals ===
29 September 1991 Semi-final	Portaferry	2–11 – 2–08	Lavey	O'Neill Park
	C Mageean 0-6, P Mason 1-1, A Mageean 1-1, L McMullan 0-1, G McGrattan 0-1, K Fitzsimons 0-1.		S Downey 2-4, O Collins 0-3, M Collins 0-1.

6 October 1991 Semi-final	Middletown Na Fianna	1–03 – 3–18	Ruairí Óg, Cushendall	Athletic Grounds
	C Casey 1-0, G McCann 0-3.		J Carson 1-4, T McNaughton 1-3, B McGaghey 1-0, Danny McNaughton 0-2, Donagh McNaughton 0-2, P Walsh 0-2, D McKeegan 0-2, A McGuile 0-1, J McNaughton 0-1, L McKeever 0-1.

=== Ulster final ===
13 October 1991 Final	Ruairí Óg, Cushendall	1–16 – 0–05	Portaferry	Casement Park
	J Carson 0-11, A McGuile 1-2, J McNaughton 0-1, T McNaughton 0-1, D McKeegan 0-1		C Mageean 0-4, G McGrattan 0-1.

== All-Ireland Senior Club Hurling Championship ==
=== All-Ireland quarter-final ===
8 February 1992 Quarter-final	Seán Treacy's	0–06 – 0–23	Cashel King Cormacs	Emerald GAA Grounds
	M McGrath 0–3, J Cormack 0–2, J Prendeville 0–1.		T Grogan 0–10, PJ Connolly 0–4, T Moloney 0–3, J Grogan 0–2, C Bonnar 0–2, J O'Donoghue 0–2.

=== All-Ireland semi-finals ===
8 February 1992 Semi-final	Ruairí Óg, Cushendall	1–06 – 2–09	Birr	Páirc Mhuire
	A McGuile 1–0, D McNaughton 1–0 (og), J Carson 0–3, J McNaughton 0–2, S McKeegan 0–1.		P Murphy 1–1, D Pilkington 0–2, B Whelehan 0–2, J Pilkington 0–1, O O'Neill 0–1, M Errity 0–1.	Referee: T Murray (Limerick)

23 February 1992 Semi-final	Cashel King Cormacs	2–07 – 1–10	Kiltormer	Leahy Park
	TJ Connolly 1–1, T Grogan 0–4, J O'Donoghue 1–0, J Grogan 0–2.		J Campbell 1–1, M Staunton 0–3, D Cox 0–2, C Hayes 0–2, S Kelly 0–1, T Furey 0–1.	Referee: D Murphy (Wexford)

8 March 1992 Semi-final replay	Kiltormer	1–14 – 2–11 (aet)	Cashel King Cormacs	Dunlo GAA Grounds
	D Curley 1–4, C Hayes 0–4, J Campbell 0–3, T Kilkenny 0–1, D Cox 0–1, M Staunton 0–1.		T Moloney 1–4, TJ Connolly 1–2, T Grogan 0–5.	Referee: D Murphy (Wexford)

17 March 1992 Semi-final second replay	Kiltormer	2–08 – 1–08	Cashel King Cormacs	Croke Park
	M Staunton 1–0, T Furey 1–0, D Curley 0–3, D Cox 0–2, T Larkin 0–1, A Staunton 0–1, Tony Kilkenny 0–1.		J Grogan 1–0, T Grogan 0–3, R Ryan 0–2, Colm Bonnar 0–2, Cormac Bonnar 0–1.	Referee: D Murphy (Wexford)

=== All-Ireland final ===
29 March 1992 Final	Kiltormer	0–15 – 1–08	Birr	Semple Stadium
	D Curley 0–7, J Campbell 0–3, C Hayes 0–2, M Staunton 0–1, T Furey 0–1, T Kilkenny 0–1.		R Landy 1–0, D Pilkington 0–3, J Errity 0–2, G Cahill 0–2, D Regan 0–1.	Referee: D Murphy (Wexford)

== Championship statistics ==
=== Top scorers ===
Rank	Player	Club	Tally	Total	Matches	Average
1	Tommy Grogan	Cashel King Cormacs	1–35	38	6	6.33
2	Declan Pilkington	Birr	0–22	22	5	4.40
3	Jackie Carson	Ruairí Óg	1–18	21	3	7.00
4	Damian Curley	Kiltormer	1–17	20	4	5.00
5	Joe Henry	Tooreen	1–13	16	2	8.00
6	T. J. Connolly	Cashel King Cormacs	2–09	15	6	2.50
7	Justin Campbell	Kiltormer	2–08	14	4	3.50
8	Mick Deely	Moorefield	3–04	13	3	4.33
8	Declan Myers	Carnew Emmets	2–07	13	2	6.50
8	Séamus Daly	Lismore	2–07	13	2	6.50
