= 1999–2000 All-Ireland Senior Club Hurling Championship =

All-Ireland Senior Club Hurling Championship 1999–2000
Championship Details
- Dates: 17 October 1999 – 17 March 2000
- Teams: 26

All Ireland Champions
- Winners: Athenry (2nd win)
- Captain: Joe Rabbitte

All Ireland Runners-up
- Runners-up: St Josephs Doora-Barefield
- Captain: Ciarán O'Neill

Provincial Champions
- Munster: St Josephs Doora-Barefield
- Leinster: Birr
- Ulster: Ruairí Óg
- Connacht: Athenry

Championship Statistics
- Matches Played: 28
- Top Scorer: Eugene Cloonan (3–24)

The 1999–2000 All-Ireland Senior Club Hurling Championship was the 30th staging of the All-Ireland Senior Club Hurling Championship, the Gaelic Athletic Association's premier inter-county club hurling tournament. The championship began on 17 October 1999 and ended on 17 March 2000.

St. Joseph's Doora-Barefield were the defending champions.

On 17 March 2000, Athenry won the championship following a 0–16 to 0–12 defeat of St. Joseph's Doora-Barefield in the All-Ireland final. This was their third All-Ireland title, their first in three championship seasons.

Athenry's Eugene Cloonan was the championship's top scorer with 3–24.

== Results ==
=== Connacht Senior Club Hurling Championship ===
First round

2 October 1999 First round	Tubbercurry	1–14 – 2–05	St. Mary's Kiltoghert	Kilcoyne Park, Tubbercurry
	P Seevers 1–11.		K Glancy 1–1, A O'Shea 1–0, B Beirne 0–2, C Cunniffe 0–1, D O'Grady 0–1.

Quarter-final

24 October 1999 Quarter-final	Tooreen	w/o – scr.	Tubbercurry

Semi-final

14 November 1999 Semi-final	Tooreen	1–11 – 2–07	St. Dominic's	AThleague Sportsfield
	J Cunnane 0–9, M Trench 1–1, F Delaney 0–1.		E Gormley 2–1, C Fallon 0–4, P Lyons 0–1, T Killian 0–1.

Final

28 November 1999 Final	Tooreen	1–06 – 1–13	Athenry	Garrymore GAA Ground
	J Cunnane (1–2), J Henry (0–1), M Trench (0–1), Declan Greally (0–1), Dom Greally (0–1).	Report	E Cloonan (0–6), D Moran (1–1), D Donoghue (0–2), D Burns (0–2), S Donoghue (0–1), B Keogh (0–1),	Referee: A Flaherty (Roscommon)

=== Leinster Senior Club Hurling Championship ===
First round

17 October 1999 First round	Kilmessan	w/o – scr.	Wolfe Tones

17 October 1999 First round	Naomh Moninne	0–7 – 0–15	Faughs
	M McNamara 0–4 (4f), C Connolly (f), J Murphy and G Collins 0–1 each.	Report	J Small 0–5, A O'Grady O-4 (3f, '65), K McGrath and C Bonar 0–2 each, C McCann and J Williams 0–1 each.	Referee: J McGrath (Westmeath)

17 October 1999 First round	Lough Lene Gaels	2–12 – 2–10	Coill Dubh	Cusack Park
	J Kennedy and G Briody 1–1 each, J Williams, B Williams 0–3 each, F O'Farrell 0–2, A Murray and S Fitzpatrick 0–1 each.		R Byrne 0–7, Chris Byrne and T Carew 1–1 each, Colm Byrne 0–1.	Referee: P Neary (Kilkenny)

17 October 1999 First round	Kiltegan	3–13 – 1–10	Erin's Own	Aughrim County Ground
	M Moran 3–2, J Keogh 0–5, J O'Toole 0–2, N Byrne, G Bermingham, S Byrne and A Furlong 0–1 each.	Report	D Byrne 0–5, C Coady 1–0, G Doyle 0–3, J O Neill 0–2.	Referee: P Delaney (Laois)

Quarter-finals

30 October 1999 Quarter-final	Faughs	2–2 – 1–12	Castletown	Parnell Park
	D Kelly (1–1), J Small (1–0), C Bonar (0–1).	Report	D Cuddy (1–3), Paul Cuddy (0–4), G Cuddy (0–3), F O'Sullivan (0–1), P Phelan (0–1).	Referee: B Kelly (Westmeath)

31 October 1999 Quarter-final	Lough Lene Gaels	0–9 – 3–15	Glenmore	Castletown-Geoghegan GAA Grounds
	F O'Farrell (0–2), J Kennedy (0–2), S Fitzpatrick (0–1), M Shaw (0–1), J Williams (0–1), G Briody (0–1), D Cunningham (0–1).	Report	R Heffernan (1–6), M Phelan (2–0), P Fitzgerald (0–4), J Phelan (0–3), PJ O'Connor (0–1), M Mullally (0–1).

31 October 1999 Quarter-final	Kilmessan	1–3 – 4–15	St. Martin's	St. Loman's Park
	G O'Neill (1–0), A O'Neill (0–1), P Donnelly (0–1), E O'Brien (0–1).	Report	J O'Connor (2–1), B Lambert (0–5), P Murphy (1–1), R Lambert (1–1), R McCarthy (0–2), R Quigley (0–1), D Murphy (0–1), K Furlong (0–1), M Murphy (0–1), T Radford (0–1).	Referee: J Sheridan (Kildare)

31 October 1999 Quarter-final	Kiltegan	0–8 – 1–12	Birr	Aughrim Park
	J Keogh (0–5), D Hayes (0–1), G Bermingham (0–1), N Moran (0–1).	Report	R Hannify (1–0), S Whelahan (0–3), O O'Neill (0–3), D Pilkington (0–2), G Hannify (0–2), J Pilkington (0–1), Brian Whelahan (0–1).	Referee: J Walsh (Kilkenny)

Semi-finals

14 November 1999 Semi-final	St. Martin's	1–9 – 1–14	Castletown	Nowlan Park
	J O'Connor (1–4, two pens and three frees), D Murphy (0–2 frees), T Codd (0–1), B Lambert (0–1, free), P Murphy (0–1).	Report	F O'Sullivan (1–2), D Cuddy (0–4), P Phelan (0–2), P Cuddy (0–2, one free), P Dollard (0–1), G Cuddy (0–1), E Kirwan (0–1), C Cuddy (0–1).

14 November 1999 Semi-final	Glenmore	1–8 – 1–12	Birr	Dr. Cullen Park
	J Phelan (1–3), R Heffernan (0–2), D Mullally (0–2), S Dollard (0–1).	Report	S Whelahan (0–4), D Pilkington (1–0), O O'Neill (0–3), G Hannify (0–2), J Pilkington (0–1), D Hannify (0–1), R Hannify (0–1).	Referee: P Ahern (Carlow)

Final

28 November 1999 Final	Birr	1–16 – 0–11	Castletown	Nowlan Park
	S Whelehan (0–5, frees), D Pilkington (1–1), B Whelehan (0–4, frees), G Hanniffy (0–3), P Molloy (0–1), B Milne (0–1), J Pilkington (0–1).	Report	P Cuddy (0–5, 3 frees, 65), P Phelan (0–2, frees), F O'Sullivan (0–1), P Cuddy (0–1), E Kirwan (0–1), J O'Sullivan (0–1).	Referee: A Mac Suibhne (Dublin)

=== Munster Senior Club Hurling Championship ===
Quarter-finals

17 October 1999 Quarter-final	Lixnaw	0–5 – 2–21	Ballygunner	Austin Stack Park
	P Galvin 0–3, M Conway and K Dowling 0–1 each.	Report	T Carroll 0–6, B O'Sullivan 0–5, M Mahony and L White 1–2 each, P Flynn 0–3, S Lyons, P Foley and P Power 0–1 each.	Referee: D Richardson (Limerick)

24 October 1999 Quarter-final	Ahane	1–9 – 0–12	Tommevara	Gaelic Grounds
	J Morrissey (1–0), T Herbert (0–3), O Moran (0–3), S O'Connor (0–1), J Moran (0–1), J Meskell (0–1).	Report	Tommy Dunne (0–8), M Bevans (0–2), P O'Brien (0–1), P King (0–1).	Referee: P Moore (Waterford)

31 October 1999 Quarter-final replay	Tommevara	1–10 – 1–8	Ahane	Semple Stadium
	Tomas Dunne (1–7), B Duff (0–1), P O'Brien (0–1), J O'Brien (0–1).	Report	J Meskill (1–1), T Herbert (0–2), O Moran (0–2), J Moran (0–2), S O'Connor (0–1).	Referee: P Moore (Waterford)

Semi-finals

14 November 1999 Semi-final	Toomevara	0–12 – 2–11	St. Joseph's Doora-Barefield	Semple Stadium
	J O'Brien (0–3), T Dunne (0–2, both frees), P King (0–2), T Delaney (0–1), T Dunne (0–1), B Duff (0–1), P O'Brien (0–1), K Dunne (0–1).		J O'Connor (0–5, one free), S McMahon (0–4, all frees), A Whelan (1–0), D O'Driscoll (1–0), D Hoey (0–1), G Baker (0–1).	Referee: P O'Connor (Limerick)

14 November 1999 Semi-final	Ballygunner	0–17 – 1–11	Blackrock	Walsh Park
	P Flynn 0–9 (0-5f), T Carroll 0–4, M Mahony 0–2, B O'Sullivan, D O'Sullivan 0–1 each.	Report	A Browne 0–5 (0-3f 1 x `65'), S Coakley 1–0, A Coughlan 0–3 (all f), B Hennebry 0–2, J Cashman 0–1 (f).	Referee: W Barrett (Tipperary)

Final

28 November 1999 Final	St. Joseph's Doora-Barefield	4–9 – 3–8	Ballygunner	Semple Stadium
	C O'Neill (2–1), G Baker (1–1), S McMahon (1–1, goal from penalty, point from free), J O'Connor (0–2), A Whelan (0–1), O Baker (0–1, a sideline), J Considine (0–1), C Mullen (0–1).	Report	P Flynn (1–5, three points from frees, one from 65), P Foley (1–0), D O'Sullivan (1–0), S Frampton (0–1), M Mahony (0–1), P Power (0–1).	Referee: J McDonnell (Tipperary)

=== Ulster Senior Club Hurling Championship ===
Semi-finals

19 September 1999 Semi-final	Dungannon	0–4 – 2–22	Ballygalget	O'Neill Park
	P Lavery 0–4, E Devlin 0–1.	Report	C McGrattan 2–1, M Coulter jnr 0–7, M Coulter 0–5, B Smith 0–4, B Coulter, P Coulter 0–2 each, B Gallagher 0–1

19 September 1999 Semi-final	Lavey	0–13 – 1–10	Ruairí Óg	Lavey Sportsfield
	O Collins 0–6, A McCrystal, B McCormack, S Downey 0–2 each, M Collins 0–1.	Report	C McCambridge 1–4, M McCambridge 0–2, K Elliott, D McKillop, D McNaughton, A Delargey 0–1 each.

25 September 1999 Semi-final replay	Ruairí Óg	2–21 – 2–18	Maghera-Lavey	Casement Park
	Conor McCambridge 1–6, B McNaughton 1–2, A Delargy 0–4, Michael McCambridge 0–4, J Carson 0–3, D McKillop 0–2.	Report	O Collins 1–12, M McCormick 1–0, S Downey 0–3, P McCloy 0–1, A McChrystal 0–1, M Collins 0–1.	Referee: G Devlin (Armagh)

Final

3 October 1999 Final	Ruairí Óg	1–12 – 1–8	Ballygalget	Casement Park
	J Carson (1–4), Conor McCambridge (0–4), K McKeegan (0–2), B McNaughton (0–1), D McKillop (0–1).	Report	Tom Coulter (0–5), B Coulter (1–0), B Smyth (0–2), C McGrattan (0–1).	Referee: G Devlin (Armagh)

=== All-Ireland Senior Club Hurling Championship ===
Quarter-final

5 December 1999 Quarter-final	St. Gabriel's	1–9 – 2–19	Athenry	Emerald GAA Grounds
	N Dunne (1–2), R Murphy (0–5), D Hurley (0–1), M O'Meara (0–1).	Report	E Cloonan (1–6), C Moran (1–2), D Donoghue (0–4), D Moran (0–2), P Higgins (0–1), A Poniard (0–1), B Feeney (0–1), B Keogh (0–1), B Hanley (0–1).	Referee: J McDonnell (Tipperary)

Semi-finals

13 February 2000 Semi-final	Athenry	2–9 – 1–10	Birr	Semple Stadium
	E Cloonan (2–3, one goal from a free), P Higgins (0–2), B Keogh (0–1), J Rabbitte (0–1), D Moran (0–1), D Donohue (0–1).	Report	O O'Neill (1–2, goal and a point from frees), Brian Whelahan (0–3, two frees), G Hanniffy (0–3), D Pilkington (0–1), S Whelahan (0–1, a free).	Referee: W Barrett (Tipperary)

13 February 2000 Semi-final	St. Joseph's Doora-Barefield	0–12 – 0–12	Ruairí Óg	Parnell Park
	J O'Connor (0–5, four frees), S McMahon (0–2, both frees), F O'Sullivan (0–2), C Mullen (0–1), G Baker (0–1), A Whelan (0–1).	Report	C McCambridge (0–6, four frees), F McAllister (0–2), K Elliot (0–2), M McCambridge (0–1), J Carson (0–1).	Referee: A Mac Suibhne (Dublin)

19 February 2000 Semi-final replay	St. Joseph's Doora-Barefield	1–14 – 1–8	Ruairí Óg	Parnell Park
	L Hassett (0–6), A Whelan (1–0), J O'Connor (0–2, both frees), S McMahon (0–2, both frees), O Baker (0–1, a sideline cut), C O'Neill (0–1), C Mullen (0–1), P Fahy (0–1).	Report	C McCambridge (0–4, all frees), K Elliott (1–0), Mark McCambridge (0–2), A Delargy (0–2).	Referee: A Mac Suibhne (Dublin)

Final

17 March 2000 Final	Athenry	0–16 – 0–12	St. Joseph's Doora-Barefield	Croke Park
	E Cloonan 0–9 (5f, 1 penalty), B Hanley 0–3 (1f), D Moran 0–2, J Rabbitte, D Donohue 0–1 each.		S McMahon 0–6 (4f,2 '65s), J O'Connor 0–3 (1f), D Hoey, O Baker and A Whelan 0–1 each.	Attendance: 31,965; Referee: M Wadding (Waterford)

== Championship statistics ==
=== Top scorers ===
Top scorers overall

Rank	Player	County	Tally	Total	Matches	Average
1	Eugene Cloonan	Athenry	3–24	33	4	8.25
2	Conor McCambridge	Ruairí Óg	2–24	30	5	6.00
3	Ollie Collins	Lavey	1–18	21	2	10.50
4	Tommy Dunne	Toomevara	1–17	20	3	6.66
4	Paul Flynn	Ballygunner	1–17	20	3	6.66
5	Seánie McMahon	St. Joseph's Doora-Barefield	0–18	18	5	3.60
6	Jamesie O'Connor	St. Joseph's Doora-Barefield	0–17	17	5	3.40
7	John O'Connor	St. Martin's	3-05	14	2	7.00
7	Paul Seevers	Tubbercurry	1–11	14	1	14.00
7	Johnny Cunnane	Tooreen	1–11	14	2	7.00

Top scorers in a single game

Rank	Player	County	Tally	Total	Opposition
1	Ollie Collins	Lavey	1–12	15	Ruairí Óg
2	Paul Seevers	Tubbercurry	1–11	14	St. Mary's Kiltoghert
3	Michael Moran	Kiltegan	3-02	11	Erin's Own
4	Tommy Dunne	Toomevara	1-07	10	Ahane
5	Eugene Cloonan	Athenry	2-03	9	Birr
5	Eugene Cloonan	Athenry	2-03	9	Birr
5	Ray Heffernan	Glenmore	1-06	9	Lough Lene Gaels
5	Conor McCambridge	Lavey	1-06	9	Ruairí Óg
5	Eugene Cloonan	Athenry	1-06	9	St. Gabriel's
5	Paul Flynn	Ballygunner	0-09	9	Blackrock
5	Eugene Cloonan	Athenry	0-09	9	St. Joseph's Doora-Barefield
5	Johnny Cunnane	Tooreen	0-09	9	St. Dominic's
