= 1991 Offaly Senior Hurling Championship =

Annual hurling competition season

- Champions: Birr (11th title); Brian Whelehan (captain); Ken Hogan (manager)
- Runners-up: Seir Kieran; Mick Coughlan (captain); Eugene Coughlan (manager)

The 1991 Offaly Senior Hurling Championship was the 94th staging of the Offaly Senior Hurling Championship since its establishment by the Offaly County Board in 1896.

St Rynagh's were the defending champions.

The final was played on 13 October 1991 at St Brendan's Park in Birr, between Birr and Seir Kieran, in what was their first ever meeting in the final. Birr won the match by 1–12 to 1–11 to claim their 11th championship title overall and a first title in 20 years.

== Results ==
=== Semi-finals ===
29 September 1991 Semi-final	Seir Kieran	1-13 - 0-12	Lusmagh	St Brendan's Park
	Johnny Dooley 0-5, Joe Dooley 1-0, B Dooley 0-3, M Coughlan 0-2, J Mooney 0-2.		J Troy 0-4, P Temple 0-3, B Troy 0-3, B McGarry 0-1, J Kelly 0-1.

29 September 1991 Semi-final	Birr	1-16 - 1-09	St Rynagh's	St Brendan's Park
	O O'Neill 1-3, D Pilkington 0-5, J Errity 0-4, D Regan 0-2, J Pilkington 0-1, P Murphy 0-1.		M Conneely 1-6, R Mannion 0-2, D Fogarty 0-1.

=== Final ===
13 October 1991 Final	Birr	1-12 - 1-11	Seir Kieran	St Brendan's Park
	P Murphy 1-1, A Cahill 0-4, O O'Neill 0-3, D Pilkington 0-1, D Regan 0-1, J Errity 0-1, P Kirwan 0-1.		Johnny Dooley 0-5, M Coughlan 1-1, Joe Dooley 0-3, B Dooley 0-2.
