= 2001–02 All-Ireland Senior Club Hurling Championship =

All-Ireland Senior Club Hurling Championship 2001–2002
Championship Details
- Dates: 7 October 2001 – 17 March 2002
- Teams: 26

All Ireland Champions
- Winners: Birr (3rd win)
- Captain: Simon Whelahan
- Manager: Pat Joe Whelahan

All Ireland Runners-up
- Runners-up: Clarinbridge
- Captain: Micheál Donoghue
- Manager: Billy McGrath

Provincial Champions
- Munster: Ballygunner
- Leinster: Birr
- Ulster: Dunloy
- Connacht: Clarinbridge

Championship Statistics
- Matches Played: 27
- Top Scorer: Paul Flynn (1–42)

The 2001–02 All-Ireland Senior Club Hurling Championship was the 32nd staging of the All-Ireland Senior Club Hurling Championship, the Gaelic Athletic Association's premier inter-county club hurling tournament. The championship began on 20 October 2001 and ended on 17 March 2002.

Athenry were the defending champions but were defeated by Clarinbridge in the county championship and thus failed to qualify. Clarinbridge, O'Loughlin Gaels, Adare and Clonkill were all first-time participants in the championship, while Kilmoyley and Ballinkillen made returns after prolonged absences.

On 17 March 2002, Birr won the championship following a 2–10 to 1–5 defeat of Clarinbridge in the All-Ireland final. This was their third All-Ireland title overall and their first title in four championship seasons.

Ballygunner's Paul Flynn was the championship's top scorer with 1–42.

== Results ==
=== Connacht Senior Club Hurling Championship ===
First round

13 October 2001 First round	Tubbercurry	3–09 – 1–09	St. Mary's Kiltoghert	Kilcoyne Park, Tubbercurry
	P Seevers 0–5, R Haughey 1–0, R Brennan 1–0, S Kerins 1–0, F Cretaro 0–3, G Perry 0–1.		A O'Shea 0–6, D O'Grady 1–2, C Cunniffe 0–1.

Second round

28 October 2001 Second round	Tubbercurry	3–16 – 2–16 (aet)	Belmullet	Kilcoyne Park, Tubbercurry
	P Seevers 0–11, J Burke 2–1, M Gorman 1–1, R Brennan 0–1, R Haughey 0–1, G Perry 0–1.		J Sweeney 1–2, G McDonnell 0–4, R Howe 0–3, C Carey 1–0, D McDonnell 0–2, K Conroy 0–2, D Smith 0–1, A Howard 0–1, V Murphy 0–1,	Referee: M Carroll (Roscommon)

Semi-final

4 November 2001 Semi-final	Four Roads	3–10 – 1–05	Tubbercurry	Athleague Sportsfield, Athleague
	D Lohan 1–2, R Mulry 0–4, A Mulry 1–0, T Lennon 1–0, M Cunniffe 0–2, J Mannion 0–1, P Glennon 0–1.		P Seevers 1–4, J Burke 0–1.	Referee: JJ Larkin (Galway)

Final

18 November 2001 Final	Four Roads	1–06 – 2–18	Clarinbridge	Athleague Sportsfield, Athleague
	B Mannion 1–0, M Cunniffe 0–3, T Lennon, L Gately, R Mulry 0–1.	Report	D Forde 1–2, A Kerins 0–4, M Carr 1–0, P Coen, D Coen, M Kerins, C Coen, D Donoghue 0–2, L Madden, E Heaney 0–1.	Referee: M Carroll (Roscommon)

=== Leinster Senior Club Hurling Championship ===
First round

20 October 2001 First round	Naas	4–15 – 1–11	Ballinkillen	Sallins Road, Naas
	J Ryan 1–5, E Denieffe 1–4, L Maloney 1–1, J Kinlon 1–1, N Swan 0–1, P Brennan 0–1, M Hennessy 0–1, J Brennan 0–1.	Report	A Gaule 0–7, P Ryan 1–0, T Walsh 0–2, G Foley 0–1, P Walsh 0–1.

21 October 2001 First round	Kiltegan	0–16 – 2–07	Clonkill	Aughrim County Ground, Aughrim
	J Keogh 0–5, J O’Toole 0–4, K Furlong 0–3, M Moran 0–2, C O’Toole 0–2.		A Mitchell 1–1, C Kelly 1–0, G Fagan 0–2, B Murtagh 0–2, S Loughlin 0–1, J Forbes 0–1.	Referee: P Ahern (Carlow)

21 October 2001 First round	Slasher Gaels	0–09 – 2–21	Craobh Chiaráin	Michael Fay Park, Longford
	G Ghee (0–7, 3 frees), J Hynes (0–1), J Newman (0–1).	Report	C Ring (0–11, 8 frees), R Farrelly (1–0), D Keane (1–0), C Hetherton (0–3), J McGuirke (0–3), G Ennis (0–2), S McDonnell (0–2).	Referee: F Smith (Meath)

3 November 2001 First round	Trim	0–07 – 2–08	Knockbridge	St. Loman's Park, Trim
	D Murray 0–2, A Smith 0–1, J Faulkner 0–1, J Toole 0–1, B Murray 0–1, R Fitzsimons 0–1.		E Quigley 2–0, S Byrne 0–4, R Kelly 0–2, D Dunne 0–2.	Referee: J O’Connell (Westmeath)

Quarter-finals

3 November 2001 Quarter-final	Kiltegan	0–04 – 2–12	Castletown	Aughrim County Ground, Aughrim
	J Keogh (0–2), J O'Toole (0–1), G Wynne (0–1).	Report	D Cuddy (1–4), B Ferns (1–1), Padraig Cuddy (0–4), P Phelan (0–2), J Palmer (0–1).	Referee: P Dunphy (Kilkenny)

3 November 2001 Quarter-final	Craobh Chiaráin	0–05 – 2–21	O'Loughlin Gaels	Parnell Park, Dublin
	C Ring 0–2, F Kelly 0–1, C Hetherton 0–1, D Keane 0–1.		N Skehan 1–7, B Kelly 1–1, A Geoghegan 0–4, M Comerford 0–4, B Dowling 0–4, J Daly 0–1.

4 November 2001 Quarter-final	Naas	0–5 – 2–18	Birr	Sallins Road, Naas
	J Kinlon (0–1), J Ryan (0–1), E Denieffe (0–1), P Rohan (0–1), N Swan (0–1).	Report	R Hanniffy (1–4), G Hanniffy (1–4, three frees), S Whelahan (0–4, three frees), J Pilkington (0–2), D Franks (0–1), Brian Whelahan (0–1), D Pilkington (0–1), C Hanniffy (0–1).	Referee: A Stapleton (Laois)

17 November 2001 Quarter-final	Knockbridge	0–5 – 4–12	Faythe Harriers	Knockbridge Sportsfield, Knockbridge
	S Byrne (0–4, 2 frees), E Quigley (0–1).	Report	M Mackey (1–2), G Buggy (1–2, 2 frees), N Denton (1–1), B Goff (1–1), N Shiel (0–3), B Redmond (0–3).	Referee: F Smith (Meath)

Semi-finals

18 November 2001 Semi-final	Birr	2–12 – 0–11	O'Loughlin Gaels	Dr. Cullen Park, Carlow
	S Whelahan (1–2, two frees), G Hanniffy (0–4, two frees), P Molloy (1–0), D Pilkington (0–2), J Pilkington (0–2, one sideline), R Hanniffy (0–1), Barry Whelahan (0–1).	Report	S Dowling (0–3, two frees), A Geoghegan (0–2), B Dowling (0–2), N Skehan (0–2, both frees), M Comerford (0–1), A Comerford (0–1, a sideline).	Referee: D Murphy (Wexford)

25 November 2001 Semi-final	Castletown	1–10 – 1–05	Faythe Harriers	Nowlan Park, Kilkenny
	J Hoban (1–1), D Cuddy (0–3), F O'Sullivan (0–3), P Phelan (0–2), J Palmer (0–1).	Report	M Mackey (1–0), B Goff (0–2), G Buggy (0–2), N Sheil (0–1).	Referee: P Dunphy (Kilkenny)

Final

2 December 2001 Final	Birr	0–10 – 1–07	Castletown	Nowlan Park, Kilkenny
	B Whelehan (0–4, 70, 3 fs), S Brown (0–4), D Pilkington (0–1).	Report	JP Kingston (1–0), D Cuddy (0–3, 2 fs), P Phelan (0–2, 1 f), J Palmer (0–1), F O'Sullivan (0–1).	Referee: D Murphy (Wexford)

Final replay

16 December 2001 Final replay	Birr	2–10 – 0–05	Castletown	Nowlan Park, Kilkenny
	S Whelahan (1–8, 0–4 frees), S Brown (1–1), Barry Whelahan (0–1).	Report	D Cuddy (0–2, one free), F O'Sullivan (0–2), J Palmer (0–1).	Referee: D Morris (Dublin)

=== Munster Senior Club Hurling Championship ===
Quarter-finals

20 October 2001 Quarter-final	Kilmoyley	2–06 – 2–14	Blackrock	Lerrig Sportsfield, Kilmoyley
	S Brick 0–5, R Gentleman 1–0, B Brick 1–0, D Young 0–1.		A Browne 2–7, L Meaney 0–3, D Gosnell 0–2, D Cashman 0–2.	Referee: D O'Driscoll

28 October 2001 Quarter-final	Ballygunner	2–19 – 2–13	St. Joseph's Doora-Barefield	Walsh Park, Waterford
	P Flynn (0–13, 9 frees), M Mahony (1–2), P Foley (1–2), A Moloney (0–1), B O'Sullivan (0–1).	Report	S McMahon (0–6, frees), J O'Connor (0–6, 5 frees), C Mullen (1–0), C O'Connor (1–0, pen), L Hassett (0–1).	Referee: P O'Connor (Limerick)

Semi-finals

3 November 2001 Semi-final	Blackrock	1–14 – 1–11	Adare	Páirc Uí Chaoimh, Cork
	A Browne 0–10, D Cashman 1–1, B Hennebry 0–2, J O’Flynn 0–1.		C Fitzgerald 0–9, D Sheehan 1–0, M Alfred 0–1, C Murphy 0–1.	Referee: W Barrett (Tipperary)

18 November 2001 Semi-final	Toomevara	1–09 – 0–12	Ballygunner	Semple Stadium, Thurles
	K Dunne (0–6, five frees), J O'Brien (1–1), Tomas Dunne (0–1, free), B Duff (0–1).	Report	P Flynn (0–10, seven frees, one 65), B O'Sullivan (0–1), M Mahony (0–1).	Referee: S McMahon (Clare)

25 November 2001 Semi-final replay	Ballygunner	2–10 – 0–15	Toomevara	Walsh Park, Waterford
	A Moloney (2–0), P Flynn (0–6, five frees), B O'Sullivan (0–1), Tony Carroll (0–1), P Power (0–1), M Mahony (0–1).	Report	K Dunne (0–7, four frees), Tommy Dunne (0–4, three frees, one 65), J O'Brien (0–2), E Brislane (0–1), F Devaney (0–1).	Referee: G Harrington (Cork)

Final

2 December 2001 Final	Ballygunner	2–14 – 0–12	Blackrock	Semple Stadium, Thurles
	P Flynn (1–9, six frees, two 65s), P Foley (1–1), B O'Sullivan (0–2), S Frampton (0–1), A Moloney (0–1).	Report	A Browne (0–4, two frees, one 65), B O'Keeffe (0–2), A Coughlan (0–2, one free, one 65), L Meaney (0–2), P Tierney (0–1), D Cashman (0–1).	Referee: P O'Connor (Limerick)

=== Ulster Senior Club Hurling Championship ===
Semi-finals

7 October 2001 Semi-final	Dunloy	6–17 – 1–06	Burt	Casement Park
	M Curry (2–4), A Elliott (2–4), P Richmond (1–2), L Richmond (1–1), M Molloy (0–2), F McMullan (0–1), C Cunning (0–1), D McMullan (0–1), E McKee (0–1).		R Durack (1–1), A Wallace (0–2), A McDermott (0–1), R McLaughlin (0–1), M McCann (0–1).	Referee: M Glass (Derry)

7 October 2001 Semi-final	Lavey	1–18 – 3–11	Portaferry	Casement Park
	O Collins 0–11, M Collins 1–1, P Heraty 0–2, B McCormack 0–1, K McCloy 0–1, S Downey 0–1, D McGill 0–1.		P Braniff 2–4, G McGrattan 0–3, N Sands 1–0, P Mallon 0–2, B Milligan 0–1, G Adair 0–1.

Final

21 October 2001 Final	Dunloy	3–11 – 1–06	Lavey	Casement Park
	P Richmond 2–3, A Elliott 0–3, C McGuckan 1–0, M Molloy 0–2, G O'Kane 0–2, L Richmond 0–1.	Report	S Downey 1–2, O Collins 0–2, B Ward, P McCloy 0–1 each.	Referee: G Devlin (Armagh)

== All-Ireland Senior Club Hurling Championship ==
=== All-Ireland quarter-finals ===
2 December 2001 Quarter-final	Fr Murphy's	1–06 – 6–12	Dunloy	Emerald GAA Grounds
	S Teehan (1–1). I Rocks, (0–2), S Murphy (0–1), M Reilly (0–1), E Kinlan (0–1).	Report	A Elliott (5–0), P Richmond (1–2), M Curry (0–4), G O'Kane (0–2), C McGuckian (0–2), P McMullan (0–2).

=== All-Ireland semi-finals ===
17 February 2002 Semi-final	Clarinbridge	1–15 – 2–08	Ballygunner	Semple Stadium
	D Coen (0–7, all frees), A Kerins (1–2), D Donoghue (0–2), B Carr (0–1), P Coen (0–1), M Kerins (0–1), D Forde (0–1).	Report	P Foley (1–1), B O'Sullivan (1–1), P Flynn (0–4, two frees, one 65), P Power (0–1), T Carroll (0–1).	Referee: B Kelly (Westmeath)

17 February 2002 Semi-final	Birr	2–12 – 1–11	Dunloy	St Tiernach's Park
	S Whelahan (1–4, two points frees), S Brown (1–0), P Molloy (0–2), G Hanniffy (0–2), Barry Whelahan (0–1), R Hanniffy (0–1), Brian Whelahan (0–1, 65), N Claffey (0–1).	Report	D McMullan (0–3, two frees, 65), P McMullan (1–0), A Elliott (0–3, two frees), C Cunning (0–2), M Curry (0–1), C McGuckian (0–1), L Richmond (0–1).	Referee: S Roche (Tipperary)

=== All-Ireland final ===
17 March 2002 Final	Birr	2–10 – 1–05	Clarinbridge	Semple Stadium
	S Whelahan 0-4f, D Pilkington and J Pilkington 1–0 each, S Brown and G Hanniffy 0–2 each, R Hanniffy 0–1, Brian Whelahan 0-1f.	Report	D Donoghue 1–1, D Coen 0-4f.	Referee: G Harrington (Cork)

== Championship statistics ==
=== Top scorers ===
Rank	Player	County	Tally	Total	Matches	Average
1	Paul Flynn	Ballygunner	1–42	45	5	9.00
2	Alastair Elliott	Dunloy	7–10	31	4	7.75
2	Simon Whelehan	Birr	3–22	31	5	6.20
4	Alan Browne	Blackrock	2–21	27	3	9.00
5	Paul Seevers	Tubbercurry	1–20	23	3	7.66
6	Paddy Richmond	Dunloy	4–07	19	4	4.75
7	Martin Curry	Dunloy	2–09	15	4	3.75
7	David Cuddy	Castletown	1–12	15	4	3.75
7	Gary Hanniffy	Birr	1–12	15	5	3.00
10	Paul Foley	Ballygunner	3–04	13	5	2.60
10	Ollie Collins	Lavey	0–13	13	2	6.50
10	Connie Ring	Craobh Chiaráin	0–13	13	2	6.50
10	Darragh Coen	Clarinbridge	0–13	13	3	4.33
10	Ken Dunne	Toomevara	0–13	13	2	6.50
