= Birr GAA =

Gaelic games club in County Offaly, Ireland

Birr
- Biorra
- Founded: 1909
- County: Offaly
- Colours
- Grounds: St Brendan's Park
- Coordinates: 53°05′29.32″N 7°54′27.76″W

Playing kits
Standard colours

Senior Club Championships
	All Ireland	Leinster champions	Offaly champions
Hurling:	4	7	22

Birr GAA is a Gaelic Athletic Association club in Birr, County Offaly, Ireland. The club is affiliated to the Offaly Cork Board and is primarily concerned with the game of hurling, but also fields teams in Gaelic football.

== History ==
Located in the town of Birr, on the Offaly-Tipperary border, Birr GAA Club was established in 1909. After just a few short years, the club had its first success when, in 1912, they claimed the first of three Offaly SHC in four seasons. After a lapse of 23 years, Birr had a successful 10-year period between 1938 and 1948, during which time the club claimed six Offaly SHC titles. Birr won their 10th Offaly SHC in 1971.

Birr had their most successful and dominant era in the 17-year period between 1991 and 2008. During that time the club won 12 Offaly SHC titles, including a record-equalling five-in-a-row between 1999 and 2003, followed by a four-in-a-row between 2005 and 2008.

Seven Leinster Club SHC titles were also claimed by the club during this period. Birr became the first club team to win four All-Ireland Club SHC titles, after defeats of Dunloy (1995), Sarsfields (1998), Clarinbridge (2002) and Dunloy (2003).

== Honours ==
- All-Ireland Senior Club Hurling Championship (4): 1995, 1998, 2002, 2003
- Leinster Senior Club Hurling Championship (7): 1991, 1994, 1997, 1999, 2001, 2002, 2007
- Offaly Senior Hurling Championship (22): 1912, 1913, 1915, 1938, 1940, 1943, 1944, 1946, 1948, 1971, 1991, 1994, 1997, 1999, 2000, 2001, 2002, 2003, 2005, 2006, 2007, 2008
- Offaly Intermediate Hurling Championship (4): 1997, 1998, 1999, 2007
- Offaly Junior A Hurling Championship 91): 1985
- Offaly Junior A Football Championship (5): 1918, 1946, 1992, 2001, 2005

== Notable players ==
- Joe Errity: All-Ireland SHC-winner (1994, 1998).
- Johnny Pilkington: All-Ireland SHC-winner (1994, 1998).
- Brian Whelahan: All-Ireland SHC-winner (1994, 1998).
