= 2003 All-Ireland Senior Hurling Championship final =

2003 All-Ireland Hurling Final
- Event: 2003 All-Ireland Senior Hurling Championship
Kilkenny	Cork
1–14	1–11
- Date: 14 September 2003
- Venue: Croke Park, Dublin
- Man of the Match: Noel Hickey
- Referee: Pat O'Connor (Limerick)
- Attendance: 79,383
- Weather: Dry

The 2003 All-Ireland Senior Hurling Championship Final was the 116th All-Ireland Hurling Final and the culmination of the 2003 All-Ireland Senior Hurling Championship, a tournament for the top hurling counties. The match was held at Croke Park, Dublin, on 14 September 2003, between Kilkenny and Cork. Kilkenny won on a score line of 1–14 to 1–11.

== Match details ==
14 September 2003
15:30 UCT+1

Kilkenny	1–14 – 1–11	Cork
M. Comerford 1–4; H. Shefflin 0–6 (0–4 frees); T. Walsh 0–3; D. Lyng 0–1	(report)	J. Deane 0–5 (0–4 frees); S. Ó hAilpín 1–0; N. McCarthy 0–2; T. McCarthy 0–1; B. O'Connor 0–1; J. O'Connor 0–1; S. McGrath 0–1

Croke Park, Dublin
Attendance: 79,383
Referee: P. O'Connor (Limerick)

KILKENNY:
GK	1	James McGarry
RCB	2	Michael Kavanagh
FB	3	Noel Hickey
LCB	4	James Ryall (substituted off) 60'
RWB	5	Seán Dowling
CB	6	Peter Barry
LWB	7	J. J. Delaney
MD	8	Derek Lyng
MD	9	Paddy Mullally (substituted off) 60'
RWF	10	Henry Shefflin
CF	11	John Hoyne
LWF	12	Tommy Walsh (substituted off) 45'
RCF	13	D. J. Carey (c)
FF	14	Martin Comerford
LCF	15	Eddie Brennan (substituted off) 69'
Substitutes:
	16	P. J. Ryan
	17	Phil Larkin
	18	Richie Mullally (substituted in) 60'
	20	Conor Phelan (substituted in) 45'
	21	Andy Comerford (substituted in) 60'
	22	Jimmy Coogan (substituted in) 69'
	23	Aidan Cummins
	24	Jackie Tyrrell
	25	Ken Coogan
	26	Brian Dowling
	27	Aidan Fogarty
	28	Stephen Grehan
	29	Walter Burke

CORK:
GK	1	Donal Óg Cusack
RCB	2	Wayne Sherlock
FB	3	Diarmuid O'Sullivan
LCB	4	Pat Mulcahy
RWB	5	Tom Kenny
CB	6	Ronan Curran
LWB	7	Seán Óg Ó hAilpín
MD	8	John Gardiner
MD	9	Mickey O'Connell (substituted off) 38'
RWF	10	Ben O'Connor (substituted off) 66'
CF	11	Niall McCarthy
LWF	12	Timmy McCarthy
RCF	13	Setanta Ó hAilpín
FF	14	Joe Deane
LCF	15	Alan Browne (c)
Substitutes:
	16	Paul Morrissey
	17	Brian Murphy
	18	Mark Prendergast
	19	Derek Barrett
	20	Kieran Murphy
	21	Seánie McGrath (substituted in) 66'
	22	Jerry O'Connor (substituted in) 38'
	23	Brendan Lombard
	24	Paul Tierney
	25	Martin Coleman, Jnr
	26	Michael Byrne
	27	Adrian Coughlan
	28	Aidan Fitzpatrick
	29	John Anderson
	30	Jason Barrett

MATCH RULES

- 70 minutes.
- Replay if scores level.
- Five substitutes allowed
