= Brendan Walsh (hurler) =

Irish hurler (1972–2023)

Personal information
- Native name: Breandán Breathnach (Irish)
- Born: December 1972 Killeagh, County Cork, Ireland
- Died: 1 May 2023 (aged 50) Killeagh; County Cork, Ireland
- Occupation: Carpenter

Sport
- Sport: Hurling
- Position: Centre-forward
Clubs
- Years: Club
- Killeagh → Imokilly
Club titles
- Cork titles: 2
Inter-county
Years	County	Apps (scores)
1991–1992	Cork	0 (0-00)
Inter-county titles
- Munster titles: 0
- All-Irelands: 0
- NHL: 0
- All Stars: 0

Brendan Walsh (December 1972 – 1 May 2023) was an Irish hurler. At club level he played with Killeagh, divisional side Imokilly, and also lined out at inter-county level with various Cork teams.

== Playing career ==
Walsh first played hurling at club level with Killeagh. He progressed from the juvenile and underage ranks to adult level and won a Cork JAHC title in 1995. Walsh's performances with the club earned a call-up to the Imokilly team, and he was a panellist when the divisional side won consecutive Cork SHC titles in 1997 and 1998. He completed the full set of championship medals when Killeagh beat Mallow in a replay to win the Cork IHC in 2001.

At inter-county level, Walsh first appeared on the Cork minor hurling team that won the Munster MHC title in 1990. He was overlooked for the under-21 team the following year but joined the senior team's training panel in December 1991. Walsh lined out during the latter stages of the 1991–92 National League campaign but was not included on the Munster SHC panel. Instead, he joined the Cork junior team and won a Munster JHC medal that year. Walsh won a Munster U21HC medal in 1993.

== Death ==
Walsh died on 1 May 2023, at the age of 50.

== Honours ==
Killeagh

- Cork Intermediate Hurling Championship: 2001
- Cork Junior A Hurling Championship: 1995
- East Cork Junior A Hurling Championship: 1995

Imokilly

- Cork Senior Hurling Championship: 1997, 1998

Cork

- Munster Junior Hurling Championship: 1992
- Munster Under-21 Hurling Championship: 1993
- Munster Minor Hurling Championship: 1990
