= Walter Burke (disambiguation) =

Walter Burke may refer to:

People:

- Walter Burke (1908-1984), American actor
- Walter Burke (purser) (1736-1815), purser on board HMS Victory
- Walter Burke (hurler) (born 1981), Irish hurler
- W. S. Burke (AKA Walter Samuel Burke) (1861-unknown), British writer
- Walter T. Burke (1911-2007), American politician
- Ping Burke (birth name Walter Burke), American baseball player from the 1930s

Places:

- Walter Burke Institute for Theoretical Physics, research center in California
