= 1995 Cork Junior A Hurling Championship =

1995 Cork Junior Hurling Championship
- Dates: 10 September – 22 October 1995
- Teams: 7
- Champions: Killeagh (1st title); Mark Landers (captain)
- Runners-up: Ballinhassig; Seán McCarthy (captain)

Tournament statistics
- Matches played: 6
- Goals scored: 13 (2.17 per match)
- Points scored: 128 (21.33 per match)
- Top scorer(s): Joe Deane (2-17); Seán McCarthy (1-20)

The 1995 Cork Junior Hurling Championship was the 98th staging of the Cork Junior Hurling Championship since its establishment by the Cork County Board. The championship ran from 10 September to 22 October 1995.

The final was played on 22 October 1995 at Páirc Uí Chaoimh in Cork between Killeagh and Ballinhassig, in what was their first ever meeting in the final. Killeagh won the match by 3-09 to 2-08 to claim their first ever championship title.

Killeagh's Joe Deane and Ballinhassig's Seán McCarthy were the championship's top scorers.

== Qualification ==
Division	Championship	Champions
Avondhu	North Cork Junior A Hurling Championship	Kilworth
Carbery	West Cork Junior A Hurling Championship	Bandon
Carrigdhoun	South East Junior A Hurling Championship	Ballinhassig
Duhallow	Duhallow Junior A Hurling Championship	Banteer
Imokilly	East Cork Junior A Hurling Championship	Killeagh
Muskerry	Mid Cork Junior A Hurling Championship	Grenagh
Seandún	City Junior A Hurling Championship	Na Piarsaigh

== Results ==
=== Quarter-finals ===
10 September 1995 Quarter-final	Grenagh	2-13 - 0-13	Banteer	Castle Grounds
	A Dorgan 1-5, P McDonnell 0-6, N O'Connell 1-0, P Coleman 0-1, M Kenny 0-1.		Colm Buckley 0-5, M Doyle 0-3, D Scanlon 0-2, J O'Mahony 0-1, MJ O'Keeffe 0-1, T O'Donoghue 0-1.	Referee: M O'Flaherty

23 September 1995 Quarter-final	Ballinhassig	0-19 - 3-09	Bandon	Innishannon Grounds
	S McCarthy 0-8, Damien McCarthy 0-4, Denis McCarthy 0-3, M Higgins 0-1, D Lombard 0-1, P Brennan 0-1, D Mullaney 0-1.		M Lyons 2-0, P Crowley 0-5, J Nyhan 1-0, D O'Donoghue 0-3, J O'Regan 0-1.	Referee: D O'Leary (Cloughduv)

23 September 1995 Quarter-final	Killeagh	0-12 - 0-05	Na Piarsaigh	Erin's Own Grounds
	J Deane 0-8, B Walsh 0-2, G Scully 0-2.		P Kelleher 0-3, D Kidney 0-1, T Allen 0-1.

=== Semi-finals ===
1 October 1995 Semi-final	Kilworth	1-08 - 1-11	Killeagh	St. Catherine's Park
	P Shanahan 1-2, S Carey 0-2, J Sheehan 0-1, C Carey 0-1, A Kenny 0-1, E Pierce 0-1.		J Deane 1-6, B Walsh 0-2, M Treacy 0-1, G Scully 0-1, A Leahy 0-1.	Referee: J Kearney (Na Piarsaigh)

15 October 1995 Semi-final	Ballinhassig	3-13 - 0-08	Grenagh	Ballyanly Grounds
	S McCarthy 1-7, P Brennan 1-1, J Aherne 1-1, Damien McCarthy 0-2, J Mullally 0-1, Denis McCarthy 0-1.		P McDonnell 0-5, A Dorgan 0-1, D O'Riordan 0-1, N O'Connell 0-1.	Referee: E Murphy (Douglas)

=== Final ===
22 October 1995 Final	Killeagh	3-09 - 0-08	Ballinhassig	Páirc Uí Chaoimh
	B Walsh 1-4, J Deane 1-3, A Leahy 1-0, M Landers 0-1, G Scully 0-1.		S McCarthy 0-5, P Brennan 0-2, G Aherne 0-1.	Referee: J Kearney (Na Piarsaigh)

== Championship statistics ==
=== Top scorers ===
Overall

Rank	Player	Club	Tally	Total	Matches	Average
1	Joe Deane	Killeagh	2-17	23	3	7.66
1	Seán McCarthy	Ballinhassig	1-20	23	3	7.66
3	Brendan Walsh	Killeagh	1-08	11	3	3.66
3	Pádraig McDonnell	Grenagh	0-11	11	2	5.50
5	Aidan Dorgan	Grenagh	1-06	9	2	4.50

In a single game

Rank	Player	Club	Tally	Total	Opposition
1	Seán McCarthy	Ballinhassig	1-07	10	Grenagh
2	Joe Deane	Killeagh	1-06	9	Kilworth
3	Aidan Dorgan	Grenagh	1-05	8	Banteer
3	Seán McCarthy	Ballinhassig	0-08	8	Bandon
3	Joe Deane	Killeagh	0-08	8	Na Piarsaigh
6	Brendan Walsh	Killeagh	1-04	7	Ballinhassig
7	Mick Lyons	Bandon	2-00	6	Ballinhassig
7	Joe Deane	Killeagh	1-03	6	Ballinhassig
7	Pádraig McDonnell	Grenagh	0-06	6	Banteer
10	Pat Shanahan	Kilworth	1-02	5	Killeagh
10	Colm Buckley	Banteer	0-05	5	Grenagh
10	Pádraig Crowley	Bandon	0-05	5	Ballinhassig
10	Pádraig McDonnell	Grenagh	0-05	5	Ballinhassig
10	Seán McCarthy	Ballinhassig	0-05	5	Killeagh
