= Wayne Sherlock =

Irish hurler (born 1978)

Personal information
- Native name: Uaithne Scorlóg (Irish)
- Born: 21 June 1978 (age 48) Mahon, Cork, Ireland
- Occupation: Supply chain operator
- Height: 5 ft 10 in (178 cm)

Sport
- Sport: Hurling
- Position: Corner-back
Club
Years	Club	Apps (scores)
1996-2012	Blackrock	69 (0-01)
Club titles
- Cork titles: 3
Inter-county*
Years	County	Apps (scores)
1999-2007	Cork	27 (0-01)
Inter-county titles
- Munster titles: 5
- All-Irelands: 3
- NHL: 0
- All Stars: 1
- *Inter County team apps and scores correct as of 18:50, 1 February 2019.

Wayne Sherlock (born 21 June 1978) is an Irish retired hurler who played for Cork Senior Championship club Blackrock. He played for the Cork senior hurling team for 8 seasons, starting as a right wing-back before later lining out as a right corner-back. Sherlock is considered to be one of the greatest defenders of his era.

Sherlock began his hurling career at club level with Ballinure before transferring to the nearby Blackrock club. He broke onto the club's top adult team straight out of the minor grade in 1996. Sherlock made 69 championship appearances for the club before his retirement in 2012 and was part of the Cork Senior Championship-winning teams of 1999, 2001 and 2002.

At inter-county level, Sherlock was part of the successful Cork under-21 team that won back-to-back All-Ireland Championships in 1997 and 1998. He joined the Cork senior team in 1999. From his debut, Sherlock was ever-present as a defender and made a combined total of 66 National League and Championship appearances in a career that ended with his last game in 2007. During that time he was part of three All-Ireland Championship-winning teams – in 1999, 2004 and 2005. He also secured five Munster Championship medals and captained the team during the 2002 season. A groin injury lead to Sherlock losing his place on the starting fifteen towards the end of his career and he announced that he was leaving inter-county hurling on 30 March 2007.

Sherlock won his only All-Star in 1999. He later served as a selector with the Blackrock senior hurling team.

== Playing career ==
=== Ballinure ===
Sherlock joined the Ballinure club at a young age and played in all grades at juvenile level. He won an U12 City Division Championship with Ballinure, however, his early prowess was noted by the nearby Blackrock club and he soon transferred.

=== Blackrock ===
Sherlock ended his underage career with Blackrock. On 23 October 1994, he was at full-back when the Blackrock minor team defeated Midleton by 3-12 to 4-08 to win the Cork Premier Minor Championship. Two years later Sherlock was added to the Blackrock senior team before making his first appearance at left wing-back in a 4-18 to 2-09 defeat of Midleton on 21 June 1997.

On 1 November 1998, Sherlock lined out at centre-back in his first Cork Senior Championship final. Imokilly provided the opposition, however, Blackrock were defeated by 1-10 to 1-05.

Sherlock lined out at right corner-back in a second successive Cork Championship final on 31 October 1999. He proved effective in marking Imokilly's chief scorer Joe Deane in Blackrock's 3-17 to 0-08 defeat of University College Cork.

After surrendering their title in 2000, Sherlock lined out in a third Cork Championship final on 6 October 2001, having been appointed captain of the team earlier in the season. Imokilly provided the opposition, however, Sherlock mastered Joe Deane once again and restricted him to just one point in the 4-08 to 2-07 victory. On 2 December, Sherlock was again at right corner-back for Blackrock's 2-14 to 0-12 defeat by Ballygunner in the Munster Championship final.

On 15 September 2002, Sherlock captained Blackrock to a 1-14 to 0-12 defeat of Newtownshandrum in the Cork Championship final. It was his third and final winners' medal as well as his second as captain of the team.

Blackrock qualified for a fifth Cork Championship final in six years on 12 October 2003. Newtownshandrum provided the opposition for the second year in succession, however, in spite of "excelling" at right corner-back, Sherlock, who was captain of the team for a third successive season, ended up on the losing side by 0-17 to 1-09.

=== St Michael's ===
On 15 November 1998, Sherlock was at full-back for the St Michael's team that faced St. Finbarr's in the Cork Intermediate Championship final. A 1-11 to 0-08 victory secured the title for Sherlock's side.

=== Cork ===
==== Minor and under-21 ====
After lining out for Cork in the under-16 grade, Sherlock was later called up to the minor panel, making his only appearance at right corner-back on 26 June 1996 in a 0-16 to 1-09 defeat by Tipperary in the Munster Minor Hurling Championship.

Sherlock subsequently progressed onto the Cork under-21 team and won a Munster Championship medal at left corner-back on 30 July 1997 following a 1-11 to 0-13 defeat of Tipperary. He was at right corner-back again for the subsequent 3-11 to 0-13 All-Ireland final defeat of Galway on 21 October.

On 23 August 1998, Sherlock won a second successive Munster Championship medal after a 3-18 to 1-10 defeat of Tipperary in the final. He later won a second successive All-Ireland Championship medal at left corner-back on 20 September after a second successive 2-15 to 2-10 defeat of Galway.

==== Senior ====
Sherlock was in his third and final year of the under-21 grade when he made his first appearance for the Cork senior team on 21 February 1999. He was selected at right corner-back for a 0-14 to 1-09 defeat of Kilkenny in the National Hurling League. Sherlock made his first championship appearance when he was selected at right wing-back on 8 June for Cork's 0-24 to 1-15 Munster Championship defeat of Waterford. On 4 July, he won his first Munster Championship medal after a 1-15 to 0-14 defeat of reigning champions Clare. On 11 September, Sherlock was again at right wing-back for the All-Ireland final against Kilkenny which Cork won by 0-12 to 0-11.

On 3 July 2000, Sherlock lined out at right wing-back in his second Munster Championship final. Cork defeated Tipperary by 0-23 to 3-12, with Sherlock claiming his second successive winners' medal.

Sherlock was appointed captain of the Cork senior team for the 2002 season. On 5 May, he captained the team to a 2-15 to 2-14 defeat by Kilkenny in the National League final. At the end of the season he was nominated for an All-Star. On 29 November, Sherlock and the other 29 members of the Cork senior hurling panel announced that they were withdrawing their services from the county in the hope of better treatment from the county board. Sherlock had a low-key profile during the strike which was ultimately resolved in the players’ favour on 13 December.

Sherlock lined out in his third Munster Championship final on 29 June 2003. As left corner-back he claimed his third winners' medal after a 3-16 to 3-12 defeat of Waterford. On 14 September, he was at right corner-back for Cork's 1-14 to 1-11 All-Ireland final defeat by Kilkenny. Sherlock ended the season by being nominated for a second successive All-Star.

On 27 June 2004, Sherlock lost his first Munster final when Waterford defeated Cork by 3-16 to 1-21. In spite of this defeat, Cork later qualified for the All-Ireland final against Kilkenny. A 0-17 to 0-09 victory gave Sherlock a second All-Ireland medal. He ended the season by being named in the right corner-back position on the All-Stars team.

Sherlock picked up a severe groin injury while playing for his club in the autumn of 2004 and the recovery proved to be more complicated than was anticipated. He underwent surgery in March 2005 and was back in contention for a place on the Cork starting fifteen for the championship, however, Pat Mulcahy was now the first-choice right corner-back. In spite of this, Sherlock won his fourth Munster Championship medal on 26 June 2005 after coming on as a substitute in Cork's 1-21 to 1-16 defeat of Tipperary in the final. On 11 September 2005, Cork faced Galway in the All-Ireland final for the first time since 1990, however, Sherlock started the game as a substitute. Sherlock later said: "I was actually told to warm up and that I was coming on by one of the selectors. I spent 10 minutes warming up but nothing came out of it. I was like a fucking eejit running up and down the line. It really annoyed me because I had come on in the Munster final and the All-Ireland semi-final, so obviously I’d love to have played in another final. I was delighted ultimately because we won another All-Ireland, but not to get on — especially after being told to get ready — was a bit of a kick in the balls." In spite of not lining out, he won a third All-Ireland medal as a non-playing substitute after the 1-21 to 1-16 victory.

On 25 June 2006, Sherlock won his fifth Munster Championship medal as a non-playing substitute after a 2-14 to 1-14 defeat of Tipperary for the second consecutive year. Cork subsequently qualified for a fourth successive All-Ireland final, with Kilkenny providing the opposition for the third time. Sherlock started the game on the bench but was introduced as a substitute for Pat Mulcahy in the 1-16 to 1-13 defeat.

On 30 March 2007, it was announced that Sherlock had left the Cork senior hurling panel.

== Coaching career ==
=== Blackrock ===
In January 2016, Sherlock was added to the Blackrock senior hurling management team under Fergal Ryan. On 22 October 2017, he was a selector when Blackrock suffered a 3-13 to 0-18 defeat by Imokilly in the Cork Senior Championship final.

=== Cork ===
On 1 October 2019, Sherlock was ratified as a selector with the Cork under-20 hurling team.

== Career statistics ==
=== Club ===
Team	Season	Cork		Munster		All-Ireland		Total	
Team	Season	Apps	Score	Apps	Score	Apps	Score	Apps	Score
Blackrock	1996-97	0	0-00	—		—		0	0-00
Blackrock	1997-98	4	0-00	—		—		4	0-00
Blackrock	1998-99	4	0-00	1	0-00	—		5	0-00
Blackrock	1999-00	5	0-00	1	0-00	—		6	0-00
Blackrock	2000-01	2	0-00	—		—		2	0-00
Blackrock	2001-02	5	0-00	3	0-00	—		8	0-00
Blackrock	2002-03	5	0-00	2	0-00	—		7	0-00
Blackrock	2003-04	5	0-00	—		—		5	0-00
Blackrock	2004-05	5	0-00	—		—		5	0-00
Blackrock	2005-06	4	0-00	—		—		4	0-00
Blackrock	2006-07	3	0-00	—		—		3	0-00
Blackrock	2007-08	3	0-00	—		—		3	0-00
Blackrock	2008-09	5	0-00	—		—		5	0-00
Blackrock	2009-10	2	0-00	—		—		2	0-00
Blackrock	2010-11	4	0-01	—		—		4	0-01
Blackrock	2011-12	2	0-00	—		—		2	0-00
Blackrock	2012-13	4	0-00	—		—		4	0-00
Career total		62	0-01	7	0-00	—		69	0-01

=== Inter-county ===
Team	Year	National League			Munster		All-Ireland		Total	
Team	Year	Division	Apps	Score	Apps	Score	Apps	Score	Apps	Score
Cork	1999	Division 1B	3	0-00	2	0-00	2	0-00	7	0-00
Cork	2000	Division 1B	5	0-00	3	0-01	1	0-00	9	0-01
Cork	2001	Division 1B	5	0-01	1	0-00	—		6	0-01
Cork	2002	Division 1B	6	0-00	1	0-00	2	0-00	9	0-00
Cork	2003	Division 1B	8	0-00	2	0-00	3	0-00	13	0-00
Cork	2004	Division 1B	5	0-00	2	0-00	4	0-00	11	0-00
Cork	2005	Division 1B	—		1	0-00	1	0-00	2	0-00
Cork	2006	Division 1A	4	0-00	1	0-00	1	0-00	6	0-00
Cork	2007	Division 1A	3	0-00	—		—		3	0-00
Career total			39	0-01	13	0-01	14	0-00	66	0-02

== Honours ==
=== Player ===
Blackrock

- Cork Senior Hurling Championship (3): 1999, 2001 (c), 2002 (c)
- Cork Premier Minor Hurling Championship (1): 1994

St Michael's

- Cork Intermediate Football Championship (1): 1998

Cork

- All-Ireland Senior Hurling Championship (3): 1999, 2004, 2005
- Munster Senior Hurling Championship (5): 1999, 2000, 2003, 2005, 2006
- All-Ireland Under-21 Hurling Championship (2): 1997, 1998
- Munster Under-21 Hurling Championship (2): 1997, 1998
- Munster Under-16 Hurling Championship (1): 1994

=== Management ===
Cork

- All-Ireland Under-20 Hurling Championship: 2020, 2021
- Munster Under-20 Hurling Championship : 2020, 2021

Sporting positions
Preceded by Ben O'Connor	Cork Senior Hurling Captain; 2002	Succeeded by Alan Browne
