= Michael Byrne (hurler) =

Irish retired hurler

Personal information
- Native name: Mícheál Ó Broin (Irish)
- Born: 1978 (age 47–48) Killeagh, County Cork, Ireland
- Occupation: Plasterer
- Height: 6 ft 4 in (193 cm)

Sport
- Sport: Hurling
- Position: Centre-forward
Club
- Years: Club
- Killeagh
Club titles
- Cork titles: 0
Inter-county
Years	County	Apps (scores)
2003-2004	Cork	1 (0-0)
Inter-county titles
- Munster titles: 1
- All-Irelands: 1
- NHL: 0
- All Stars: 0

Michael Byrne (born 1978) is an Irish former hurler. At club level, he played for Killeagh and at inter-county level with the Cork senior hurling team.

== Career ==
At club level, Byrne first played hurling at juvenile and underage levels with Killeagh, before progressing to adult level. He was part of the Killeagh team that beat Mallow by 3-09 to 2-08 to win the Cork IHC title in 2001.

Byrne never played underage hurling for Cork at inter-county level, but was drafted onto the senior team in May 2003. He ended the season with a Munster SHC medal. Byrne made his debut in a National Hurling League game against Limerick in February 2004. He was an unused substitute when Cork beat Kilkenny by 0-17 to 0-09 in the 2004 All-Ireland final.

== Honours ==
Killeagh

- Cork Intermediate Hurling Championship: 2001

Cork

- All-Ireland Senior Hurling Championship: 2004
- Munster Senior Hurling Championship: 2003
