= Ballinure GAA =

Gaelic games club in County Cork, Ireland

Ballinure
- Baile an Uir
- Founded: 1959
- County: Cork
- Colours: Green and White

Playing kits
Standard colours

Ballinure GAA (Irish: Cumann Luthchleas Gael Baile an Uir) is a Gaelic Athletic Association club in Cork, Ireland. Its playing field is located on the Ringmahon Road and it draws its players from the Mahon and Ballinure areas on the south east side of the city. Teams are fielded in Gaelic football and hurling. The club participates in Cork GAA competitions and in Seandún board competitions.

== History ==
The club was founded in 1959. Notable players include Gary "Spike" O'Sullivan, a professional boxer who held the WBO International Middleweight belt.

Wayne Sherlock also played with Ballinure at a young age but then transferred to the famous Blackrock where he won Cork Senior Championships in 1999, 2001 and 2002 and a Minor Championship in 1994. He also won All-Ireland titles with Cork in 1999, 2004 and 2005.

== Honours ==
- Cork Junior B Football Championship (1): 1986
- Seandún Junior C Football Championship (4): 2011, 2012, 2015, 2016
- Seandún Junior Football Championship (1): 1985
- McCurtain Cup (1): 1962
- Sèandun Junior Hurling League (1): 1981
- Sèandun Junior B Hurling League (1): 2008, 2010
- Seandún Junior B Hurling Championship (2): 1981, 1985
- Craobh Rua Cup (2): 1981, 1985
- McSweeney Cup (1): 1986
- Cork Junior B Football Championship (1): 1986
