= Mark Landers =

Irish hurler and coach (born 1972)

Personal information
- Native name: Marc de Londras (Irish)
- Born: 13 July 1972 (age 54) Killeagh, County Cork, Ireland
- Occupation: Bank official
- Height: 6 ft 1 in (185 cm)

Sport
- Sport: Hurling
- Position: Midfield
Clubs
Years	Club	Apps (scores)
1988-2012 1994-2001	Killeagh; Imokilly	25 (4-27); 35 (5-37)
Club titles
- Cork titles: 2
Inter-county*
Years	County	Apps (scores)
1998-2003	Cork	8 (0-05)
Inter-county titles
- Munster titles: 2
- All-Irelands: 1
- NHL: 1
- All Stars: 0
- *Inter County team apps and scores correct as of 19:21, 23 April 2019.

Mark Landers (born 13 July 1972) is an Irish hurling coach and former hurler. He is the coach of Cork Senior Championship club Bride Rovers. Landers played for East Cork club Killeagh and was a member of the Cork senior hurling team for six seasons, during which time he usually lined out at midfield.

Landers began his hurling career at club level with Killeagh. He broke onto the club's top adult team as a 15 year-old in 1988 and enjoyed his first success in 1995 when the club won the Cork Junior Championship title. He later won a Cork Intermediate Championship title in 2001 and promotion to the top flight of Cork hurling. Landers made 50 championship appearances in three different grades of hurling for the club, while his early prowess also saw him selected for the Imokilly divisional team, with whom he won back-to-back Cork Senior Championship titles in 1997 and 1998.

At inter-county level, Landers was part of the successful Cork minor team that won the Munster Championship in 1990 before later winning an All-Ireland Championship with the intermediate team in 1997. He joined the Cork senior team for a series of challenge games in early 1992, however, an injury ended his progression on the team until making his competitive debut in 1998. From his debut, Landers became known as a midfielder and made a combined total of 29 National League and Championship appearances in a career that ended with his last game in 2003. During that time he was captain of Cork's All-Ireland Championship-winning team in 1999. Landers also secured two Munster Championship medals and a National Hurling League medal.

Landers has previously served as either a manager, coach or selector with University College Cork, club side Killeagh and at inter-county level with both the Cork minor and senior hurling teams.

== Playing career ==
=== Killeagh ===
Landers joined the Killeagh club at a young age and played in all grades at juvenile and underage levels, enjoying county championship success in the under-12 grade. He was just 15-years-old when he was added to Killeagh's top adult team.

On 28 August 1988, Landers was at right wing-forward when Killeagh faced Midleton in the final of the East Cork Junior Championship. In what was described in the Cork Examiner as "one of the worst finals in the annals of the division", Landers was held scoreless and replaced by his brother Richard in the 1-05 to 0-08 draw. He remained on the bench for the replay on 17 September, however, he collected a winners' medal following the 1-10 to 1-08 victory.

After losing back-to-back East Cork Championship finals in 1993 and 1994, Killeagh qualified for a third successive decider on 10 September 1995. Landers was at left wing-back and collected a second winners' medal following the 1-09 to 1-08 defeat of Watergrasshill. On 22 October, he scored a point from centre-forward when Killeagh defeated Ballinhassig by 3-09 to 0-08 to win the Cork Junior Championship and secure promotion for the first time in the club's history.

On 21 October 2001, Landers lined out at centre-back when Killeagh faced Mallow in the final of the Cork Intermediate Championship. He scored 1-01, including a goal from a 20-metre free, in the 2-14 apiece draw. Landers was again at centre-back for the replay on 4 November and collected a winners' medal following the 3-09 to 2-08 victory.

=== Imokilly ===
Landers was selected for the Imokilly divisional team for the first time during the 1994 Cork Championship. He made his first appearance for the team in a 1-07 to 0-10 first round draw with Bishopstown on 12 June 1994.

Landers was appointed captain of the Imokilly team for the 1996 Cork Championship. On 22 September he scored a point from midfield in a 1-12 apiece draw with Avondhu in the final at Páirc Uí Chaoimh. Landers again captained the team from midfield for the replay on 6 October, which Imokilly lost by 0-13 to 1-08.

On 5 October 1997, Landers was at right wing-back when Imokilly reached a second successive final. He scored a point from play and collected his first winners' medal following the 1-18 to 2-12 defeat of Sarsfields.

Imokilly qualified for a third successive final on 1 November 1998. Landers was selected at centre-back and scored three points, including two frees, in the 1-10 to 1-05 defeat of Blackrock.

Landers was appointed captain of the Imokilly team for the second time in his career for the 2001 Cork Championship. On 6 October, he captained the team from left wing-back when they faced Blackrock in the final. In spite of playing in defence, Landers top scored for Imokilly with 2-02 in the 4-08 to 2-07 defeat.

=== Cork ===
==== Minor ====
Landers first lined out for Cork as a member of the minor team during the 1990 Munster Championship. He made his first appearance for the team on 16 May and scored 1-02 from right corner-forward in an 8-22 to 1-02 defeat of Kerry. Landers was switched to full-forward for the Munster final again Clare on 15 July. He was held scoreless but collected a winners' medal following the 1-09 to 0-09 victory. On 2 September, Landers lined out at left corner-forward in Cork's 3-14 apiece draw with Kilkenny in the All-Ireland final. He was switched to full-forward for the replay on 30 September but was held scoreless in the 3-16 to 0-11 defeat.

==== Junior and intermediate ====
Landers was selected for the Cork junior team for the first time during the 1995 Munster Championship. He made his first appearance on 4 June and scored four points from centre-forward in a 3-08 to 1-12 defeat by Clare.

Landers was selected for the junior team again the following year, however, he failed to secure a place on the starting fifteen for the opening rounds. On 25 June 1996, he was introduced as a substitute at full-forward and collected a Munster Championship medal following a 2-15 to 2-10 defeat of Tipperary in the final.

On 8 June 1997, Landers made his first appearance for the Cork intermediate team. He was at centre-back for the 0-14 to 1-10 defeat of Clare in the opening round of the Munster Championship. Landers was dropped from the starting fifteen for the rest of the provincial campaign, however, he won a Munster Championship medal on 23 July when he was introduced as a substitute in the 1-15 to 1-12 defeat of Limerick in the final. He was restored to the starting fifteen for the subsequent All-Ireland Championship. On 11 October he won an All-Ireland medal after scoring a point from centre-back in the 2-11 to 1-12 defeat of Galway in the final.

==== Senior ====
Landers first played for the Cork senior team in a series of challenge games during the winter break of the 1991-92 National League. He later suffered an injury by tearing his cruciate ligament which ruled him out of a call-up to the team for the 1992 Munster Championship.

On 8 March 1998, Landers made his first appearance for the Cork senior team in a competitive game. He was selected at right wing-back when Cork defeated Kilkenny by 0-16 to 1-08 in the opening round of the 1998 National League. Landers lined out in all seven of Cork's league games and claimed a winners' medal on 17 May after a 2-14 to 0-13 defeat of Waterford in the final. He made his championship debut on 31 May when Cork defeated Limerick by 1-20 to 3-11 in the opening round of the Munster Championship.

Landers was appointed captain of the Cork senior team for the 1999 season. On 4 July, he captained the team from midfield to their first Munster Championship title since 1992 after a 1-15 to 0-14 defeat of reigning champions Clare in the final. On 16 August, Landers underwent micro-surgery at Tralee General Hospital to remove damaged cartilage from his knee after injuring himself in a club game two days earlier. While it was initially feared that the injury could end his season, Landers recovered to captain Cork against Kilkenny in the All-Ireland final on 12 September. He scored a point from midfield in the 0-12 to 0-11 victory and had the honour of becoming the first Cork player since Tomás Mulcahy in 1990 of accepting the Liam MacCarthy Cup.

Landers made four appearances for Cork during the 2000 National League, however, he failed to secure a place on the starting fifteen. On 3 July, he won a second successive Munster Championship medal, albeit as a non-playing substitute, when Cork defeated Tipperary by 0-23 to 3-12 in the final.

Cork qualified for the 2002 National League final on 5 May, with Landers starting on the bench after making only a handful of cameo appearances throughout the campaign. In the week leading up to the game there had been speculation that Gaelic Players Association members from both teams would stage a protest during the parade before the match with their socks down and jerseys out - offences punishable by fine under the GAA's match regulations. At the last training session before the final, Cork selector John Meyler is alleged to have told Landers, a prominent GPA member and one of the Cork players in favour of the protest, to " take a good look around Páirc Uí Chaoimh because he'd never see it again." Meyler dismissed this comment as "banter." The Cork players went ahead with their pre-match protest before losing the final by 2-15 to 2-14. On 29 November, Landers and six of his teammates from the Cork hurling panel held a press conference at the Imperial Hotel to announce that all 30 members of the panel were withdrawing their services from the county in the hope of better treatment from the county board. He remained a high-profile representative at the negotiations over the following two weeks and was one of five Cork hurling representatives who agreed to a settlement with the county board on 13 December.

Landers played his last game for Cork on 7 January 2003 in a 4-12 to 1-07 defeat of Blackrock in a challenge match at Páirc Uí Rinn. He was subsequently dropped from the panel by new manager Donal O'Grady, a move which effectively ending his inter-county career.

== Coaching career ==
=== University College Cork ===
Landers was appointed coach of the University College Cork senior hurling team for the 2007 season. His sole season in charge saw the team enjoy some early victories before making their exit from the Fitzgibbon Cup.

=== Cork ===
==== Minor ====
On 22 October 2013, Landers was confirmed as coach of the Cork minor hurling team. During his sole season as coach, Cork enjoyed a 5-26 to 0-09 opening round defeat of Kerry in the Munster Championship before exiting at the semi-final stage following a 0-23 to 2-15 defeat by Limerick.

==== Senior ====
On 19 November 2014, Landers joined Jimmy Barry-Murphy's Cork senior management team as coach following the departure of Kieran Kingston. On 3 May 2015, he guided Cork to the National League final where the team suffered a 1-24 to 0-17 defeat by Waterford. Cork later exited the Munster Championship following a five-point defeat by Waterford before being beaten by Galway in the All-Ireland quarter-final. The management team subsequently stepped down following this defeat, with Landers touted as a possible successor to Jimmy Barry-Murphy as manager.

=== Killeagh ===
Landers had been involved as a coach and selector at all different levels with Killeagh before being appointed manager of the club's senior team prior to the start of the 2016 Cork Senior Championship. His first championship season as manager saw Killeagh record victories over Muskerry and University College Cork, before exiting following a Round 3 defeat by Imokilly.

Landers and his management team returned for a second championship season in 2017. After an opening round defeat by Erin's Own, Killeagh later recorded wins over Douglas and Carbery before a Round 4 defeat by Sarsfields.

For the third year in succession, Landers took charge of the Killeagh senior hurling team. Opening round defeats by Douglas and St. Finbarr's sent Killeagh into the relegation play-offs where the club suffered defeats by Ballyhea and Kanturk. In spite of these defeats Killeagh were not relegated and retained their senior status for 2019. Landers subsequently stepped down as manager.

=== Bride Rovers ===
Landers was confirmed as the new coach of the Bride Rovers senior hurling team in December 2018.

== Career statistics ==
=== Club ===
Team	Year	Cork JHC	
Team	Year	Apps	Score
Killeagh	1988	0	0-00
Killeagh	1989	—	
Killeagh	1990	—	
Killeagh	1991	—	
Killeagh	1992	—	
Killeagh	1993	—	
Killeagh	1994	—	
Killeagh	1995	3	0-01
Killeagh	Total	3	0-01
Killeagh	Year	Cork IHC	
Killeagh	Year	Apps	Score
Killeagh	1996	1	0-01
Killeagh	1997	5	2-03
Killeagh	1998	4	0-09
Killeagh	1999	1	0-00
Killeagh	2000	3	1-07
Killeagh	2001	8	3-14
Killeagh	Total	22	6-34
Killeagh	Year	Cork SHC	
Killeagh	Year	Apps	Score
Killeagh	2002	5	0-07
Killeagh	2003	2	0-06
Killeagh	2004	2	1-01
Killeagh	2005	2	0-03
Killeagh	2006	3	1-01
Killeagh	2007	3	1-05
Killeagh	2008	0	0-00
Killeagh	2009	0	0-00
Killeagh	2010	3	1-03
Killeagh	2011	2	0-00
Killeagh	2012	3	0-01
Killeagh	Total	25	4-27
Career total		50	10-62

=== Division ===
Team	Year	Cork SHC	
Team	Year	Apps	Score
Imokilly	1994	4	1-04
Imokilly	1995	4	0-03
Imokilly	1996	6	0-03
Imokilly	1997	4	0-02
Imokilly	1998	4	2-05
Imokilly	1999	3	0-06
Imokilly	2000	5	0-03
Imokilly	2001	5	2-11
Career total		35	5-37

=== Inter-county ===
Team	Year	National League			Munster		All-Ireland		Total	
Team	Year	Division	Apps	Score	Apps	Score	Apps	Score	Apps	Score
Cork	1998	Division 1B	7	0-00	2	0-00	—		9	0-00
Cork	1999	Division 1B	5	0-02	2	0-02	2	0-01	9	0-05
Cork	2000	Division 1B	4	0-02	0	0-00	0	0-00	4	0-02
Cork	2001	Division 1B	3	0-00	1	0-02	—		4	0-02
Cork	2002	Division 1B	2	0-00	0	0-00	1	0-00	3	0-00
Cork	2003	Division 1B	—		—		—		—	
Career total			21	0-04	5	0-04	3	0-01	29	0-09

== Honours ==
Killeagh

- Cork Intermediate Hurling Championship (1): 2001
- Cork Junior Hurling Championship (1): 1995
- East Cork Junior A Hurling Championship (2): 1988, 1995

Imokilly

- Cork Senior Hurling Championship (2): 1997, 1998

Cork

- All-Ireland Senior Hurling Championship (1): 1999 (c)
- Munster Senior Hurling Championship (1): 1999 (c)
- National Hurling League (1): 1998
- All-Ireland Intermediate Hurling Championship (1): 1998
- Munster Intermediate Hurling Championship (1): 1998
- Munster Minor Hurling Championship (1): 1990

Sporting positions
Preceded by Diarmuid O'Sullivan	Cork Senior Hurling Captain; 1999	Succeeded by Fergal Ryan
Achievements
Preceded by Hubert Rigney	All-Ireland Senior Hurling Final winning captain 1999	Succeeded by Willie O'Connor
