= Marion McCarthy =

Irish camogie player

Personal information
- Native name: Máirín Níc Charthaigh (Irish)
- Born: Ballinhassig County Cork, Ireland

Sport
- Sport: Camogie
- Position: defence, centre field, forward, goalkeeper
- Position: defence, centre field, forward, goalkeeper
Club
- Years: Club
- Éire Óg
Inter-county
- Years: County
- 1978-91: Cork
Inter-county titles
- All-Irelands: 4

Marion McCarthy is a former camogie player from County Cork in Ireland. McCarthy won the B+I Star of the Year award in 1980, and All Ireland medals in 1978, 1980, 1982 and 1983. She won National League medals in 1984, 1986 and 1991. She is the only player in camogie history to win All Ireland medals as an outfield player and, after 1980, as a goalkeeper. She was selected as Cork camogie player of the year in 1980.

At club level, McCarthy played with Éire Óg. Her brother, Seán McCarthy, is also an All Ireland medal winner.
