= 2002 Cork Senior Hurling Championship =

Annual hurling competition season

- Dates: 27 April 2002 – 15 September 2002
- Sponsor: TSB Bank
- Champions: Blackrock (32nd title); Wayne Sherlock (captain); Tim Murphy (manager)
- Runners-up: Newtownshandrum; M. Morrissey (captain); Tom Ryan (manager)

Tournament statistics
- Matches played: 34
- Top scorer(s): Neil Ronan (2-36)

The 2002 Cork Senior Hurling Championship was the 114th staging of the Cork Senior Hurling Championship since its establishment by the Cork County Board in 1887. The draw for the 2002 opening round fixtures took place on 9 December 2001. The championship ended on 15 September 2002.

Blackrock were the defending champions.

On 15 September 2002, Blackrock won the championship following a 1–14 to 0–12 defeat of Newtownshandrum in the final. This was their 32nd championship title overall and their second in successive championship seasons.

== Team changes ==
=== To Championship ===
Promoted from the Cork Intermediate Hurling Championship

- Killeagh

== Results ==
Preliminary round

| 27 April 2002 Preliminary round | Midleton | 1-16 - 1-08 | Douglas | Caherlag Sportsfield, Glounthaune |
| | M O'Connell 0-7, D Quirke 1-3, L Walsh 0-4, E Murphy 0-1, M Quirke 0-1. | | G Wade 1-2, B Boyle 0-2, M Harrington 0-2, G McLoughlin 0-2. | Referee: D Kirwan (Éire Óg) |

Round 1

| 28 April 2002 Round 1 | Erin's Own | 2-21 - 0-09 | Castlelyons | St. Catherine's Park, Ballynoe |
| | M O'Connor 0-9, T O'Leary 1-3, S Dunne 1-3, K Óg Murphy 0-2, P Kelly 0-1, F Murphy 0-1, K Murphy 0-1, C McGann 0-1. | | E Fitzgerald 0-5, T McCarthy 0-2, D Wallace 0-1, S McAuliffe 0-1. | Referee: K Healy (Ballymartle) |

| 6 May 2002 Round 1 | St. Catherine's | 0-13 - 4-10 | St. Finbarr's | CArrigtwohill Sportsfield, Carrigtwohill |
| | C Casey 0-8, M Hegarty 0-1, D Walsh 0-1, D Farrell 0-1, G Bryan 0-1, K Morrison 0-1. | | B Cunningham 1-4, K Murray 1-3, E Fitzpatrick 1-0, C McCarthy 1-0, L O'Mahony 0-1, R O'Mahony 0-1, M Ryan 0-1. | Referee: J O'Brien (Ballygiblin) |

| 11 May 2002 Round 1 | Cloyne | 1-17 - 3-10 | Killeagh | Castlemartyr |
| | J Cotter 0-7, C Cusack 1-2, B Motherway 0-3, D O'Sullivan 0-2, A O'Brien 0-1, M Naughton 0-1, D Ring 0-1. | | J Deane 1-7, B Barry 2-2, N O'Connor 0-1. | Referee: D Kirwan (Éire Óg) |

| 11 May 2002 Round 1 | Na Piarsaigh | 5-21 - 1-06 | Ballincollig | Church Road, Blackrock |
| | Setanta Ó hAilpín 3-2, S O'Sullivan 1-5, Mick Mullins 1-4, J Gardiner 0-4, M Prendergast 0-2, D Mannix 0-2, R Sweeney 0-1, D Gardiner 0-1. | | D Beale 1-3, D Murphy 0-1, D Twomey 0-1, R Doherty 0-1. | Referee: P Hogan (Carrigtwohill) |

| 11 May 2002 Round 1 | Glen Rovers | 1-13 - 2-09 | Ballyhea | Páirc Mac Gearailt, Fermoy |
| | G O'Callaghan 1-4, J Anderson 0-4, S Kennefick 0-2, B Wall 0-1, R Kelleher 0-1, S Hackett 0-1. | | N Ronan 1-6, B Coleman 1-0, D Ronan 0-1, I Curtin 0-1, J O'Sullivan 0-1. | Referee: C McAllister (Midleton) |

| 12 May 2002 Round 1 | Blackrock | 5-11 - 0-02 | Douglas | Páirc Uí Chaoimh, Cork |
| | A Browne 3-4, B O'Keeffe 1-2, D Cashman 1-1, L Meaney 0-2, A Coughlan 0-1, J O'Flynn 0-1. | | M Harrington 0-1, W Coveney 0-1. | Referee: K Healy (Ballymartle) |

| 12 May 2002 Round 1 | Newtownshandrum | 2-11 - 0-13 | Sarsfields | Fr. Con Buckley Park, Buttevant |
| | B O'Connor 1-3, John O'Connor 1-1, M Morrissey 0-3, JP King 0-1, Jerry O'Connor 0-1, M Bowles 0-1, P Mulcahy 0-1. | | K Murphy 0-7, J O'Connor 0-2, R Duggan 0-2, R Murphy 0-1, D Kenneally 0-1. | Referee: R Murphy |

Round 2

| 1 June 2002 Round 2 | Carbery | 2-14 - 3-08 | Ballincollig | Jack Barrett Park, Kinsale |
| | G O'Donovan 1-2, W Deasy 1-2, D O'Donoghue 0-4, M O'Callaghan 0-3, A Hayes 0-2, J Nyhan 0-1. | | D Murphy 2-1, D Spillane 1-0, D Beale 0-3, R Doherty 0-3, J Miskella 0-1. | Referee: M Harrington (Carrigaline) |

| 1 June 2002 Round 2 | Carrigdhoun | 1-07 - 2-17 | Killeagh | Carrigtwohill Sportsfield, Carrigtwohill |
| | D Dineen 1-1, N Murphy 0-3, R Dwyer 0-2, G Cummins 0-1. | | J Deane 0-6, B Barry 1-2, T Fitzgibbon 1-2, M Landers 0-4, L Collins 0-2, J Brenner 0-1. | Referee: J O'Leary (Na Piarsaigh) |

| 15 June 2002 Round 2 | Douglas | 2-09 - 1-10 | St. Catherine's | Clonmult Memorial Park, Midleton |
| | G Wade 0-6, F Hayes 1-0, T O'Donovan 1-0, M Harrington 0-2, J Ross-Hunt 0-1. | | C Casey 1-4, D Walsh 0-2, S Fitzgerald 0-2, S Kearney 0-1, B Cotter 0-1. | Referee: J O'Brien (Ballygiblin) |

| 15 June 2002 Round 2 | Duhallow | 1-04 - 1-09 | Muskerry | Páirc Eoin Mhic Charthaigh, D'more |
| | S Barrett 1-2, D Crowley 0-1, G Buckley 0-1. | | D O'Riordan 0-5, D O'Leary 1-0, T O'Mahony 0-2, J Russell 0-1, E Twomey 0-1. | Referee: P Spillane (Carrigtwohill) |

| 15 June 2002 Round 2 | Ballyhea | 0-22 - 2-11 | Seandún | Mannix Park, Charleville |
| | N Ronan 0-11, D Ronan 0-2, I Curtin 0-2, John O'Sullivan 0-1, T Shanahan 0-1, B Coleman 0-1, C O'Riordan 0-1, A Crowley 0-1, I Ronan 0-1, Jonathan O'Sullivan 0-1. | | D Lucey 2-4, J O'Callaghan 0-3, JP Murphy 0-1, J Murphy 0-1, J Horgan 0-1, R O'Halloran 0-1. | Referee: C McAllister (Midleton) |

| 4 July 2002 Round 2 | Avondhu | 1-17 - 1-11 | Castlelyons | Watergrasshill |
| | P Dineen 1-5, M Gammell 0-5, J Quinlan 0-5, D McNamara 0-1, F McCormack 0-1. | | E Fitzgerald 0-5, B Fitzgerald 1-0, T McCarthy 0-2, S McAuliffe 0-1, D Wallace 0-1, D Carroll 0-1, P Cashman 0-1. | Referee: J O'Leary (Na Piarsaigh) |

| 6 July 2002 Round 2 | Imokilly | 0-13 - 1-13 | Sarsfields | Clonmult Memorial Park, Midleton |
| | J Smiddy 0-4, N McCarthy 0-4, G Holland 0-2, P Cahill 0-1, Séamus O'Farrell 0-1, R Dwane 0-1. | | J Murphy 0-7, K Murphy 1-1, J O'Connor 0-2, R Ryan 0-2, G McCarthy 0-1, | Referee: K Healy (Ballymartle) |

| 15 July 2002 Round 2 | Cork Institute of Technology | 0-06 - 1-13 | University College Cork | Páirc Uí Rinn, Cork |
| | C O'Leary 0-4, T Connors 0-1, D Duggan 0-1. | | J Kingston 1-1, M Bevans 0-4, B Carey 0-2, S Fitzpatrick 0-2, E Collins 0-1, E Morrissey 0-1, B Healy 0-1, E Murphy 0-1. | Referee: W Horgan (Brian Dillons_ |

Round 3

| 15 July 2002 Round 3 | Avondhu | 2-15 - 0-01 | Douglas | Páirc Mac Gearailt, Fermoy |
| | J Quinlan 1-4, P Dineena 1-1, M Gammell 0-4, F McCormack 0-3, D Moher 0-2, S Killeen 0-1. | | G Wade 0-1. | Referee: C McAllister (Midleton) |

| 20 July 2002 Round 3 | Sarsfields | 1-09 - 1-06 | Na Piarsaigh | Páirc Uí Chaoimh, Cork |
| | J Murphy 0-5, J O'Connor 1-0, K Murphy 0-2, P Ryan 0-1, G McCarthy 0-1. | | Mick Mullins 1-0, C O'Sullivan 0-2, S O'Sullivan 0-2, R Sweeney 0-1, J Gardiner 0-1. | Referee: G Harrington (Carrigaline) |

| 20 July 2002 Round 3 | Glen Rovers | 3-09 - 3-09 | Muskerry | Ballincollig Sportsfield, Ballincollig |
| | R Kelleher 2-1, D Busteed 1-0, S McGrath 0-3 B Corcoran 0-1, G Calnan 0-1, J Anderson 0-1, D Cunningham 0-1, S Kennefick 0-1. | | D O'Riordan 2-3, M O'Regan 1-0, E Twomey 0-3, P Dunlea 0-2, N Brennan 0-1. | Referee: C McAllister (Midleton) |

| 20 July 2002 Round 3 | Newtownshandrum | 6-13 - 1-06 | Midleton | Páirc Mac Gearailt, Fermoy |
| | B O'Connor 2-8, JP King 2-1, Jerry O'Connor 1-2, J Bowles 1-0, M Morrissey 0-2. | | L Walsh 1-3, M O'Connell 0-2, M Keohane 0-1. | Referee: W HOrgan (Brian Dillons) |

| 21 July 2002 Round 3 | Cloyne | 1-10 - 1-10 | Erin's Own | Killeagh Sportsfield, Killeagh |
| | D O'Sullivan 1-4, J Cotter 0-3, B Motherway 0-1, C Cusack 0-1, M Naughton 0-1. | | C O'Lomasney 1-0 (og), M O'Connor 0-3, K Murphy 0-3, F Murphy 0-2, T O'Leary 0-1, P Kelly 0-1. |

| 27 July 2002 Round 3 replay | Glen Rovers | 2-10 - 2-14 | Muskerry | Ballincollig Sportsfield, Ballincollig |
| | S McGrath 1-3, R Kelleher 1-1, J Anderson 0-3, K O'Callaghan 0-2, G Calnan 0-1. | | D O'Riordan 1-7, M O'Regan 1-0, J Russell 0-3, P Brosnan 0-2, E Twomey 0-2. | Referee: C McAllister (Midleton) |

| 28 July 2002 Round 3 | Blackrock | 1-12 - 1-09 | St. Finbarr's | Páirc Uí Chaoimh, Cork |
| | B Hennebrey 1-3, A Coughlan 0-5, A Browne 0-2, P Tierney 0-1, J Young 0-1. | | K Murray 1-2, M Ryan 0-4, E Fitzpatrick 0-1, R Curran 0-1, B Cunningham 0-1. | Referee: C McAllister (Midleton) |

| 3 August 2002 Round 3 | Ballyhea | 0-18 - 0-15 | Carbery | Páirc Uí Rinn, Cork |
| | N Ronan 0-13, A Crowley 0-1, I Ronan 0-1, I Curtin 0-1, D Ronan 0-1, J O'Sullivan 0-1. | | D O'Donoghue 0-8, M O'Callaghan 0-3, M Walsh 0-2, J Forrester 0-1, T Coffey 0-1. | Referee: D O'Leary (Cloughduv) |

| 4 August 2002 Round 3 | Killeagh | 1-12 - 0-15 | University College Cork | Clonmult Memorial Park, Midleton |
| | J Deane 0-7, T Fitzgibbon 1-0, B Walsh 0-1, B Barry 0-1, M Landers 0-1, J Brenner 0-1, M Byrne 0-1. | | D Sheehan 0-7, C Morrissey 0-5, T Kenny 0-1, E Collins 0-1, J Kingston 0-1. | Referee: J O'Brien (Ballygiblin) |

| 11 August 2002 Round 3 replay | Killeagh | 1-14 - 0-15 | University College Cork | Clonmult Memorial Park, Midleton |
| | J Deane 0-8, T Fitzgibbon 1-0, L Collins 0-2, M Landers 0-2, B Walsh 0-2. | | E Collins 0-9, M Bevans 0-2, J Kingston 0-1, S Brick 0-1, E Morrissey 0-1, S Fitzpatrick 0-1. | Referee: D Farrell (Mitchelstown) |

| 11 August 2002 Round 3 replay | Cloyne | 1-08 - 1-11 | Erin's Own | Killeagh Sportsfield, Killeagh |
| | D O'Sullivan 1-1, M Naughton 0-4, P Cahill 0-2, B Motherway 0-1. | | M O'Connor 0-8, T O'Leary 1-0, K Murphy 0-2, I Quinlan 0-1. | Referee: J O'Brien (Ballygiblin) |

Quarter-finals

| 17 August 2002 Quarter-final | Blackrock | 3-21 - 1-06 | Muskerry | Páirc Uí Chaoimh, Cork |
| | A Coughlan 1-3, D Cashman 1-3, B Hennebrey 1-2, A Browne 0-4, B O'Keeffe 0-4, J Young 0-3, T Meaney 0-1, C O'Reilly 0-1. | | D Riordan 1-3, F Sheehan 0-1, D O'Leary 0-1, J Russell 0-1. | Referee: K Healy (Ballymartle) |

| 17 August 2002 Quarter-final | Sarsfields | 1-16 - 1-06 | Killeagh | Cloyne Sportsfield, Cloyne |
| | J Murphy 0-7, G McCarthy 1-0, K Murphy 0-3, R Duggan 0-3, P Ryan 0-2, R Ryan 0-1. | | J Deane 0-4, B Barry 1-0, J Brenner 0-1, M Landers 0-1. | Referee: J O'Brien (Ballygiblin) |

| 17 August 2002 Quarter-final | Avondhu | 2-19 - 1-11 | Ballyhea | Fr. Con Buckley Park, Buttevant |
| | P Dineen 1-7, J Quinlan 0-6, S Killeen 1-1, M Gammell 0-2, T Riordan 0-1, T Fitzgibbon 0-1, F McCormack 0-1. | | N Ronan 1-6, I Ronan 0-3, Jonathan O'Sullivan 0-1, M O'Sullivan 0-1. | Referee: P Spillane (Carrigtwohill) |

| 18 August 2002 Quarter-final | Newtownshandrum | 0-16 - 0-10 | Erin's Own | Moore Park, Kilworth |
| | B O'Connor 0-7, John O'Connor 0-2, JP King 0-2, J Bowles 0-2, P Mulcahy 0-1, Jerry O'Connor 0-1, P Noonan 0-1. | | M O'Connor 0-3, K Murphy 0-1, S Bowen 0-1, D Mulcahy 0-1, S Dunne 0-1, I Quinlan 0-1, P Kelly 0-1, T O'Leary 0-1. | Referee: R Murphy (Lyre) |

Semi-finals

| 1 September 2002 Semi-final | Blackrock | 0-14 - 0-11 | Sarsfields | Páirc Uí Chaoimh, Cork |
| | A Coughlan 0-6, A Browne 0-4, L Meaney 0-3, B Hennebrey 0-1. | | J Murphy 0-4, R Ryan 0-3, K Murphy 0-2, C Kennedy 0-1, R Murphy 0-1. | Referee: D Kirwan (Éire Óg) |

| 1 September 2002 Semi-final | Newtownshandrum | 2-18 - 2-06 | Avondhu | Páirc Uí Chaoimh, Cork |
| | B O'Connor 0-6, JP King 1-2, Jerry O'Connor 1-2, M Morrissey 0-3, AT O'Brien 0-2, J Bowles 0-1, P Mulcahy 0-1, M Farrell 0-1. | | J Quinlan 2-1, M Gammell 0-2, T O'Riordan 0-1, P Dineen 0-1, A Walsh 0-1. | Referee: C McAllister (Midleton) |

Final

| 15 September 2002 Final | Blackrock | 1-14 – 0-12 | Newtownshandrum | Páirc Uí Chaoimh, Cork |
| | A Browne 1-4 (0-3 frees); A Coughlan 0-4 (0-2 frees); B O'Keeffe and C O'Reilly 0-2 each; B Hennebry and J Young 0-1 each. | Report | B O'Connor 0-7 (0-6 frees); J O'Connor and D Mulcahy 0-2 each; M Morrissey 0-1. | Attendance: 11,362; Referee: K Healy (Ballymartle) |

== Championship statistics ==
=== Top scorers ===
Overall

| Rank | Player | Club | Tally | Total | Matches | Average |
|---|---|---|---|---|---|---|
| 1 | Neil Ronan | Ballyhea | 2-36 | 42 | 4 | 10.50 |
| 2 | Ben O'Connor | Newtownshandrum | 3-31 | 40 | 5 | 8.00 |
| 3 | Joe Deane | Killeagh | 1-32 | 35 | 5 | 7.00 |
| 4 | Diarmuid O'Riordan | Muskerry | 4-18 | 30 | 4 | 7.50 |
| 4 | Alan Browne | Blackrock | 4-18 | 30 | 5 | 6.00 |
| 5 | John Quinlan | Avondhu | 3-16 | 25 | 4 | 6.25 |
| 5 | John Murphy | Sarsfields | 0-25 | 25 | 4 | 6.25 |
| 6 | Pa Dineen | Avondhu | 3-14 | 23 | 4 | 5.75 |
| 6 | Mark O'Connor | Erin's Own | 0-23 | 23 | 4 | 5.75 |
| 7 | Adrian Coughlan | Blackrock | 1-19 | 22 | 5 | 4.40 |

In a single game

| Rank | Player | Club | Tally | Total | Opposition |
|---|---|---|---|---|---|
| 1 | Ben O'Connor | Newtownshandrum | 2-08 | 14 | Midleton |
| 2 | Alan Browne | Blackrock | 3-04 | 13 | Douglas |
| 2 | Neil Ronan | Ballyhea | 0-13 | 13 | Carbery |
| 3 | Setanta Ó hAilpín | Na Piarsaigh | 3-02 | 11 | Ballincollig |
| 3 | Neil Ronan | Ballyhea | 0-11 | 11 | Seandún |
| 4 | Daniel Lucey | Seandún | 2-04 | 10 | Ballyhea |
| 4 | Joe Deane | Killeagh | 1-07 | 10 | Cloyne |
| 4 | Pa Dineen | Avondhu | 1-07 | 10 | Ballyhea |
| 4 | Diarmuid O'Riordan | Muskerry | 1-07 | 10 | Glen Rovers |
| 5 | Diarmuid O'Riordan | Muskerry | 2-03 | 9 | Glen Rovers |
| 5 | Neil Ronan | Ballyhea | 1-06 | 9 | Glen Rovers |
| 5 | Neil Ronan | Ballyhea | 1-06 | 9 | Avondhu |
| 5 | Mark O'Connor | Erin's Own | 0-09 | 9 | Castlelyons |
| 5 | Eamon Collins | UCC | 0-09 | 9 | Killeagh |
