= W. S. Burke =

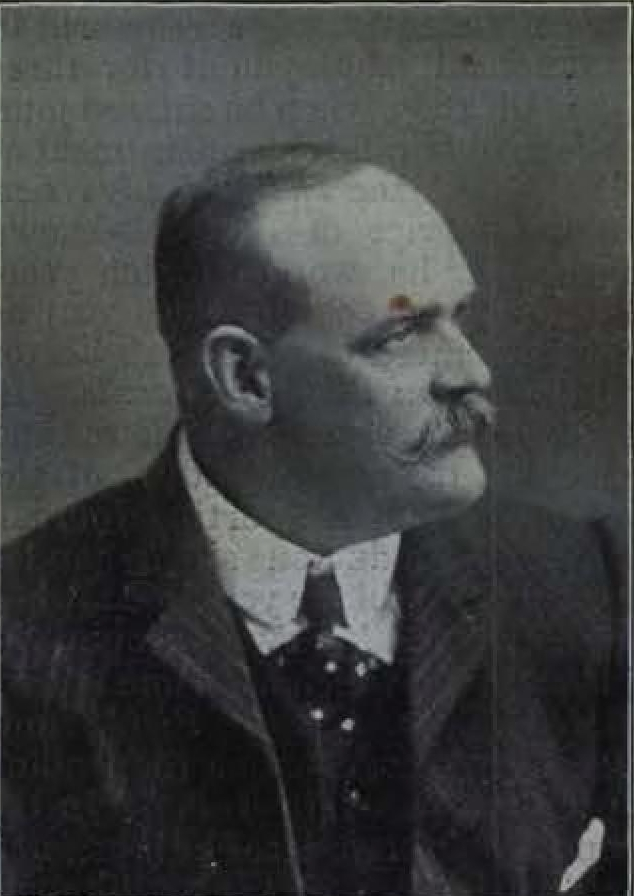

Walter Samuel Burke (born 10 October 1861; date of death unknown) was a British writer, editor, sport and outdoor enthusiast apart from being a pioneer audio recordist in India. He was a founding editor of the magazine The Indian Field.

== Life and work ==
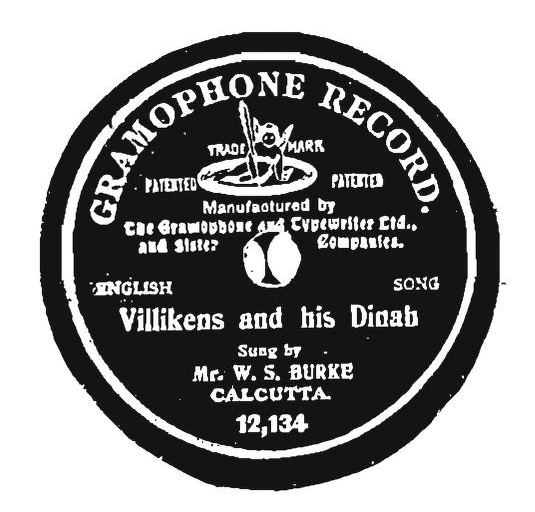
1902 recording of Burke

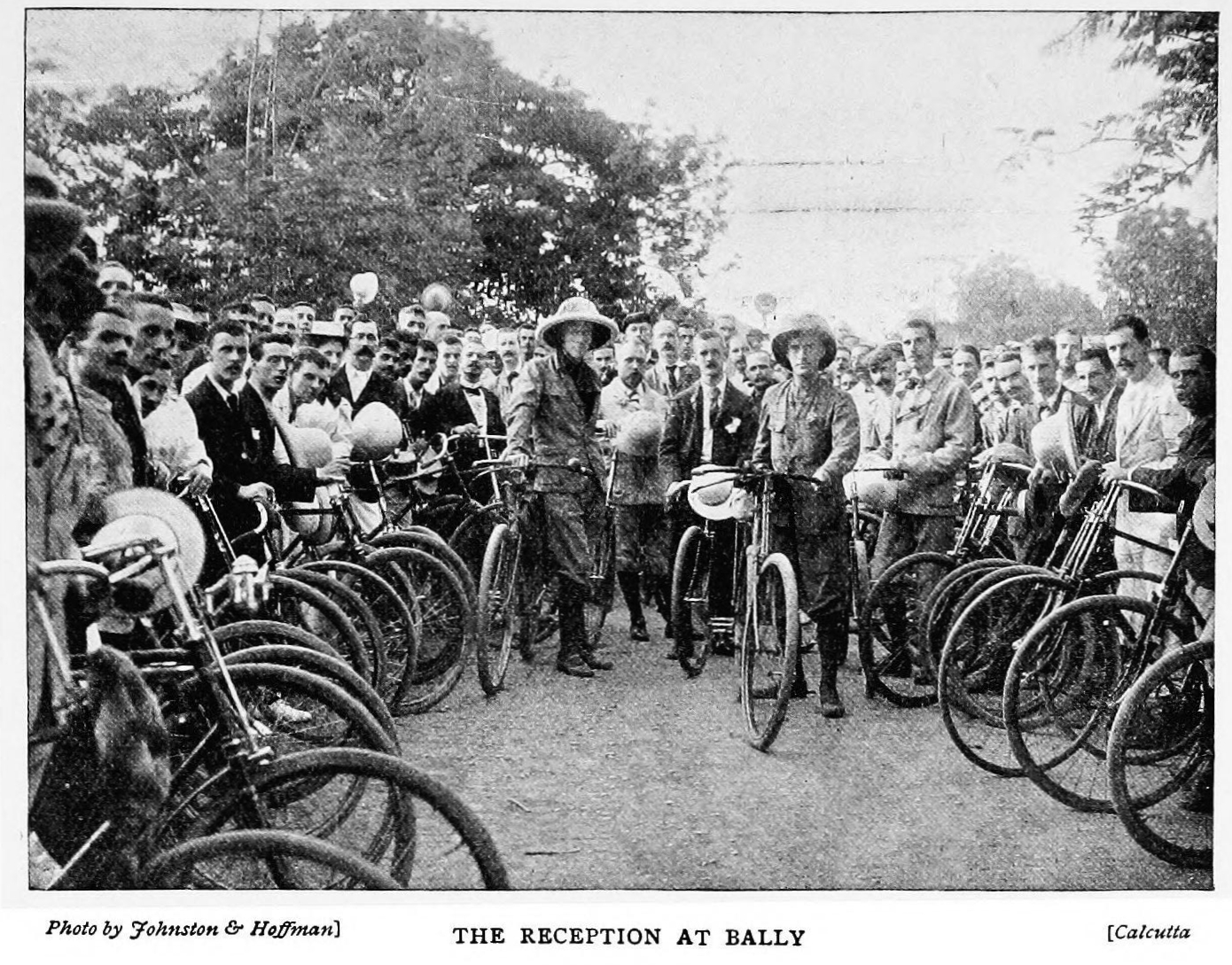
John Foster Fraser met up with Burke in Calcutta.

Burke was born in London and was educated around Europe and at St. Paul's School. He joined the Bengal Railways in 1877 and left service after a year to join the Royal Indian Marine. He left it after three years to work in a Calcutta business from 1881 although he continued to be a Calcutta Naval Volunteer from 1876. He moved to journalism in 1885 at the Indian Daily News. In 1895 he became a subeditor for the Indian Planters' Gazette and the following year worked as editor for the Asian (an Indian sporting journal). In 1902 he founded a journal of his own, The Indian Field which he edited for many years along with his son Walter Charles Burke. Burke took an interest in outdoor sports including shooting, fishing, rowing and cycling. He founded the Naval Volunteers' Athletic Club in Calcutta where he held a cycling record of 1 hour and 25 minutes for a 25-mile race. He also founded the Bengal Cyclists' Association and was a member of the Calcutta Rowing Club. He founded the Calcutta Pigeon Club, was a referee for boxing matches, known for his cross country running and sprinting. He authored several books including Athletic Sports and How to Run them, Naval Volunteers' Drill Book, The Indian Field Shikar Book, and Cycling in Bengal. He was also known for his entertaining imitations of Bengali babus and stand up performances several of which were recorded as Gramophone records, some of the oldest ever made in India. These were recitations by W. S. Burke recorded by Fred Gaisberg and George Dillnutt of the Gramophone and Typewriter Company in 1902 in Calcutta titled Villikens and his Dinah and Ram Chandra's Reminiscences.

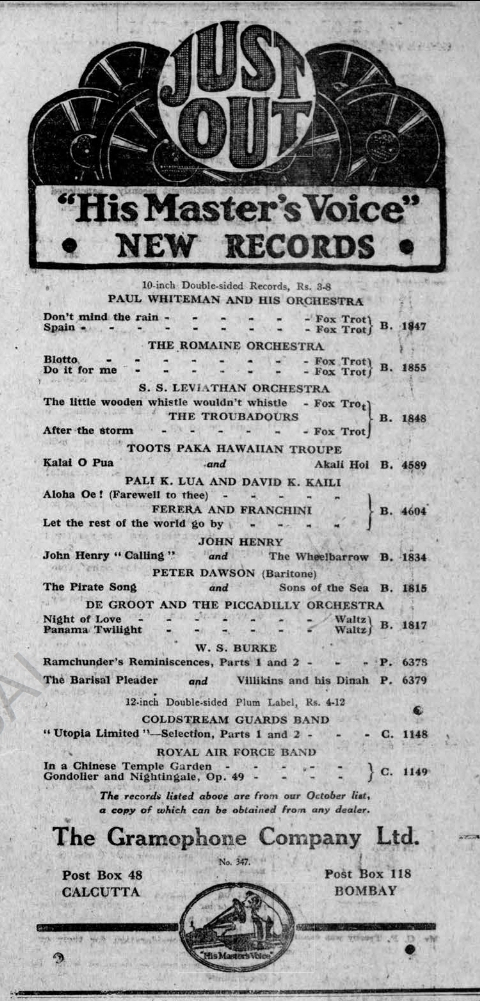
1924 gramophone advertisement

Burke married Evelina Agnes, daughter of Captain W. Pritchard, Bengal Army and they had three children. He later married Ethel, daughter of Goswin Swanseger, and they had a son. He was a grandfather of Sydney Fairbrother.
