= Aidan Cummins =

Irish hurler

Personal information
- Native name: Aodán Ó Coimín (Irish)
- Born: 22 May 1979 (age 47) Ballyhale, County Kilkenny, Ireland
- Occupation: Electrician
- Height: 6 ft 1 in (185 cm)

Sport
- Sport: Hurling
- Position: Left wing-back
Club
- Years: Club
- Ballyhale Shamrocks
Club titles
- Kilkenny titles: 6
- Leinster titles: 4
- All-Ireland Titles: 3
Inter-county
Years	County	Apps (scores)
2000-2003	Kilkenny	1 (0-00)
Inter-county titles
- Leinster titles: 0
- All-Irelands: 0
- NHL: 1
- All Stars: 0

Aidan Thomas Cummins (born 22 May 1979) is an Irish hurler who played as a left wing-back for the Kilkenny senior team.

Cummins joined the team during the 2000 championship and was a regular member of the team until his retirement from inter-county hurling after four seasons. During that time he won three All-Ireland winners' medals as a non-playing substitute and one National Hurling League winners' medal on the field of play.

At club level Cummins is a three-time All-Ireland medalist with Ballyhale Shamrocks. In addition to this he has also won four Leinster winners' medals and six championship medals.
