= 2001 Cork Senior Hurling Championship =

Annual hurling competition season

- Dates: 29 April 2001 – 6 October 2001
- Teams: 24
- Sponsor: TSB Bank
- Champions: Blackrock (31st title); Wayne Sherlock (captain); Tim Murphy (manager)
- Runners-up: Imokilly; Mark Landers (captain); Donal Morrissey (manager)

Tournament statistics
- Matches played: 33
- Goals scored: 94 (2.85 per match)
- Points scored: 835 (25.3 per match)
- Top scorer(s): Ben O'Connor (6-29)

The 2001 Cork Senior Hurling Championship was the 113th staging of the Cork Senior Hurling Championship since its establishment by the Cork County Board in 1887. The draw for the 2001 opening round fixtures took place in December 2000. The championship ended on 6 October 2001.

Newtownshandrum entered the championship as the defending champions, however, they were defeated by Imokilly in the semi-final.

On 6 October 2001, Blackrock won the championship following a 4–08 to 2–07 defeat of Imokilly in the final. This was their 31st championship title and their first in two championship seasons.

Newtownshandrum's Ben O'Connor was the championship's top scorer with 6-29.

== Team changes ==
=== To Championship ===
Promoted from the Cork Intermediate Hurling Championship

- Douglas

== Results ==
=== Preliminary round ===
29 April 2001 Preliminary round	Glen Rovers	3-14 - 0-13	St. Catherine's	Páirc Uí Chinnéide, Killeagh
	P Burke 1-3, B Corcoran 1-2, B Wall 0-4, S McGrath 1-1, G Callinan 0-1, J Anderson 0-1, G Foley 0-1, C Riodan 0-1.		M Hegarty 0-5, B Cotter 0-3, M Fitzgerald 0-2, D Walsh 0-1, G Bryan 0-1, P O'Connell 0-1.	Referee: J O'Brien (Ballygiblin)

=== First round ===
5 May 2001 First round	Castlelyons	3-14 - 1-06	Ballincollig	Riverstown Sportsfield, Riverstown
	E Fitzgerald 0-7, S McAuliffe 1-1, T McCarthy 0-4, J Molloy 1-0, D Wallace 1-0, J Mackesy 0-1, P Murphy 0-1.		D Murphy 0-5, T O'Leary 1-1.	Referee: S O'Brien (Ballygiblin)

5 May 2001 First round	Douglas	3-20 - 3-07	Bishopstown	Páirc Uí Rinn, Cork
	E Coveney 2-0, B Boyle 0-6, M Dunne 1-2, P Barry 0-5, T Twomey 0-4, G McLoughlin 0-1.		D O'Mahony 0-4, B Healy 1-0, E McCarthy 1-0, R McDonnell 1-0, D O'Regan 0-2, J Murphy 0-1.	Referee: W Horgan (Brian Dillons)

5 May 2001 First round	Cloyne	0-15 - 1-09	Na Piarsaigh	Clonmult Memorial Park, Midleton
	J Cotter 0-5, A O'Brien 0-4, D O'Sullivan 0-3, E O'Sullivan 0-2, D Motherway 0-1.		Mark Mullins 1-3, Mick Mullins 0-3, S O'Sullivan 0-1, C O'Sullivan 0-1, Setanta Ó hAilpín 0-1.	Referee: K Healy (Ballymartle)

6 May 2001 First round	Erin's Own	1-13 - 0-12	Sarsfields	Páirc Uí Chaoimh, Cork
	J Corcoran 1-7, T O'Leary 0-2, K Murphy 0-2, A Finn 0-1, C Murphy 0-1.		J Murphy 0-6, K Murphy 0-3, P Ryan 0-2, J Flynn 0-1.	Referee: D Kirwan (Éire Óg)

6 May 2001 First round	St. Finbarr's	1-22 - 3-09	Newtownshandrum	Carrowkeel Sportsfield, Mallow
	B Cunningham 0-9, K Kelleher 1-2, M Ryan 0-3, C McCarthy 0-2, I O'Mahony 0-2, I O'Dwyer 0-2, P McSweeney 0-1, T Olden 0-1.		B O'Connor 2-5, A O'Brien 1-0, P Noona 0-1, D Mulcahy 0-1, D Naughton 0-1, I Kelleher 0-1.	Referee: C McAllister (Midleton)

6 May 2001 First round	Ballyhea	2-17 - 1-16	Midleton	Páirc Mac Gearailt, Fermoy
	N Ronan 2-9, I Ronan 0-5, I Curtin 0-1, D Ronan 0-1, C O'Riordan 0-1.		M O'Connell 0-8, D O'Brien 1-2, W O'Brien 0-2, J Moynihan 0-2, P O'Brien 0-1, S Corcoran 0-1.	Referee: P O'Neill (Shamrocks)

6 May 2001 First round	Blackrock	0-17 - 0-11	St. Catherine's	Páirc Mac Gearailt, Fermoy
	A Browne 0-5, A Coughlan 0-4, B Hennebrey 0-3, L Meaney 0-2, M O'Keeffe 0-2, B O'Keeffe 0-1.		M Hegarty 0-5, D Walsh 0-4, B Cotter 0-1, D O'Connell 0-1.	Referee: J O'Brien (Ballygiblin)

=== Second round ===
16 June 2001 Second round	Newtownshandrum	2-15 - 0-06	Seandún	Kildorrery
	B O'Connor 2-6, JP King 0-4, Jerry O'Connor 0-3, AP O'Brien 0-1, D Murphy 0-1.		J Egan 0-2, B Egan 0-1, J O'Driscoll 0-1, T Kiely 0-1, K Foley 0-1.

16 June 2001 Second round	Na Piarsaigh	0-12 - 0-12	Duhallow	Castletownroche
	Mark Mullins 0-4, R Sweeney 0-3, G Daly 0-2, S O'Sullivan 0-1, J Gardiner 0-1, G Fitzgerald 0-1.		D Crowley 0-9, S O'Riordan 0-2, K McCarthy 0-1.	Referee: D Kirwan (Éire Óg)

16 June 2001 Second round	Avondhu	4-16 - 1-05	Ballincollig	Watergrasshill
	S Killeen 2-2, M Morrissey 2-2, J O'Callaghan 0-6, R O'Connell 0-2, J Quinlan 0-2, B O'Driscoll 0-1, D Maher 0-1.		A Beale 1-1, D Murphy 0-2, R Ryan 0-1, F Kelly 0-1.	Referee: P Hogan (Carrigtwohill)

16 June 2001 Second round	Imokilly	3-15 - 1-04	Bishopstown	Caherlag Sportsfield, Glounthaune
	N McCarthy 1-3, J Deane 1-2, M Daly 0-5, B Hogan 1-0, M Landers 0-2, J Barrett 0-1, J O'Driscoll 0-1, V Morrissey 0-1.		D O'Regan 1-2, E McCarthy 0-1, M Long 0-1,	Referee: G Harrington (Carrigaline)

16 June 2001 Second round	Carrigdhoun	1-13 - 0-10	Midleton	Caherlag Sportsfield, Glounthaune
	N Murphy 0-6, G Cummins 0-5, F Walsh 1-1, P Dwyer 0-1.		M O'Connell 0-5, M Keohane 0-2, J Moynihan 0-1, W O'Brien 0-1, D Quirke 0-1.	Referee: D O'Leary (Cloughduv)

17 June 2001 Second round	University College Cork	1-15 - 0-15	St. Catherine's	Páirc de Barra, Carrigtwohill
	D Sheehan 0-6, J Enright 0-5, E Collins 1-0, J O'Brien 0-2, B Phelan 0-1, T Kenny 0-1.		M Hegarty 0-4, K Morrison 0-3, D Farrell 0-2, P O'Connell 0-2, B Cotter 0-2, D O'Leary 0-1, C Casey 0-1.	Referee: W Horgan (Brian Dillons)

17 June 2001 Second round	Muskerry	3-19 - 0-16	Carbery	Coachford Sportsfield, Coachford
	D Holland 2-0, F Sheehan 0-5, K Murray 0-5, M O'Regan 1-1, J Russell 0-3, J Hughes 0-2, D Twomey 0-1, E Twomey 0-1, T O'Mahony 0-1.		M O'Callaghan 0-6, M Walsh 0-4, J Nyhan 0-3, D O'Connell 0-2, D McCarthy 0-1, C O'Brien 0-1.	Referee: R Murphy (Lyre)

17 June 2001 Second round	Sarsfields	5-11 - 0-10	Cork Institute of Technology	Páirc de Barra, Carrigtwohill
	J Murphy 3-6, G McCarthy 2-0, P Ryan 0-3, B O'Callaghan 0-1, K Murphy 0-1.		M O'Connell 0-3, T Connors 0-3, J Hogan 0-2, M Kelleher 0-1, D O'Brien 0-1.	Referee: D Farrell (Mitchelstown)

17 July 2001 Second round replay	Na Piarsaigh	2-19 - 1-08	Duhallow	Castletownroche
	Setanta Ó hAilpín 2-0, S O'Sullivan 0-6, Mark Mullins 0-6, C O'Sullivan 0-4, Mick Mullins 0-3.		D Crowley 0-6, W King 1-1, M O'Connor 0-1.	Referee: P Spillane (Carrigtwohill)

=== Third round ===
15 July 2001 Third round	Carrigdhoun	0-17 - 0-08	Douglas	Páirc Uí Rinn, Cork
	S Hayes 0-4, C Cummins 0-3, P Dwyer 0-3, N Murphy 0-3, J Hurley 0-1, F Walsh 0-1, J Murphy 0-1, A McCarthy 0-1.		B Boyle 0-3, G McLoughlin 0-2, T Twomey 0-2, T Flynn 0-1.	Referee: C McAllister (Midleton)

20 July 2001 Third round	Newtownshandrum	2-19 - 0-07	Glen Rovers	Páirc Mac Gearailt, Fermoy
	B O'Connor 1-8, Jerry O'Connor 1-4, John O'Connor 0-2, JP King 0-2, P Mulcahy 0-1, I Kelleher 0-1, D Mulcahy 0-1.		G Foley 0-2, C O'Riordan 0-2, S McGrath 0-1, R Brosnan 0-1, B Wall 0-1.	Referee: C McAllister (Midleton)

21 July 2001 Third round	Na Piarsaigh	1-19 - 2-13	St. Finbarr's	Páirc Uí Chaoimh, Cork
	C O'Sullivan 1-5, Mark Mullins 0-5, Setanta Ó hAilpín 0-2, G Shaw 0-2, Steve O'Sullivan 0-2, S O'Sullivan 0-1, R Sweeney 0-1, Mick Mullins 0-1.		B Cunningham 1-5, L O'Mahony 1-2, C McCarthy 0-3, R McCarthy 0-1, K Kelleher 0-1, J Kennedy 0-1.	Referee: K Healy (Ballymartle)

21 July 2001 Third round	Blackrock	1-13 - 0-12	Avondhu	Rathcormac
	A Coughlan 0-5, A Browne 1-1, B Hennebry 0-2, M O'Keeffe 0-1, D Gosnell 0-1, L Meaney 0-1, F Ryan 0-1.		J O'Callaghan 0-7, B O'Driscoll 0-1, S Killeen 0-1, V Burke 0-1, D Moher 0-1, J Walsh 0-1.	Referee: G Harrington (Carrigaline)

22 July 2001 Third round	Imokilly	0-18 - 1-08	Cloyne	Clonmult Memorial Park, Midleton
	J Deane 0-10, J Barrett 0-2, V Morrissey 0-2, R Dwane 0-2, N McCarthy 0-1, D Barrett 0-1.		M Naughton 1-1, J Cotter 0-4, D O'Sullivan 0-1, A O'Brien 0-1, C O'Sullivan 0-1.	Referee: G Harrington (Carrigaline)

22 July 2001 Third round	University College Cork	2-16 - 2-06	Erin's Own	Páirc Uí Chaoimh, Cork
	J Enright 0-9, J Kingston 2-1, E Collins 0-2, J O'Brien 0-1, N Brodie 0-1, C Morrissey 0-1, E Murphy 0-1.		F Horgan 1-0, J Corcoran 1-0, P Kelly 0-2, K Murphy 0-1, M O'Connor 0-1, K O'Shea 0-1, S Murphy 0-1.	Referee: J O'Leary (Na Piarsaigh)

29 July 2001 Third round	Castlelyons	3-10 - 3-09	Muskerry	Riverstown Sportsfield, Riverstown
	T McCarthy 1-2, P Murphy 1-1, E Fitzgerald 0-4, D Sheedy 1-0, D Wallace 0-1, J Molloy 0-1, P Cashman 0-1.		K Murray 3-5, M O'Regan 0-2, D Twomey 0-1, J Russell 0-1.	Referee: W Horgan (Brian Dillons)

5 August 2001 Third round	Sarsfields	1-15 - 1-13	Ballyhea	Castletownroche
	J Murphy 0-9, R Murphy 1-2, P Ryan 0-1, T Óg Lynch 0-1, G McCarthy 0-1, B O'Callaghan 0-1.		N Ronan 0-10, D Ronan 1-1, I Ronan 0-2.	Referee: P O'Neill (Shamrocks)

=== Quarter-finals ===
11 August 2001 Quarter-final	Newtownshandrum	2-17 - 2-11	Carrigdhoun	Inniscarra
	Jerry O'Connor 1-5, JP King 1-3, B O'Connor 0-4, P Mulcahy 0-2, John O'Connor 0-1, P Noonan 0-1, D Murphy 0-1.		M Prout 2-0, R Dwyer 0-4, N Murphy 0-2, F Walsh 0-2, J Mullaney 0-2, P O'Dwyer 0-1.	Referee: C McAllister (Midleton)

12 August 2001 Quarter-final	Blackrock	3-12 - 1-13	University College Cork	Páirc Uí Chaoimh, Cork
	A Browne 0-7, D Cashman 1-1, B O'Keeffe 1-0, A Cummins 1-0, F Ryan 0-1, A Coughlan 0-1, P Tierney 0-1, D Gosnell 0-1.		J Enright 1-10, J Kingston 0-2.	Referee: D Farrell (Ballygiblin)

11 August 2001 Quarter-final	Na Piarsaigh	1-14 - 2-11	Castlelyons	Páirc Uí Chaoimh, Cork
	Mark Mullins 0-7, Setanta Ó hAilpín 1-1, G Fitzgerald 0-3, R Sweeney 0-2, Colin O'Sullivan 0-1.		T McCarthy 1-4, E Fitzgerald 1-1, S McAuliffe 0-3, D Sheehan 0-2, C McGann 0-1.	Referee: K Healy (Ballymartle)

12 August 2001 Quarter-final	Imokilly	1-14 - 0-09	Sarsfields	Cloyne
	J Deane 1-4, B Coleman 0-3, M Landers 0-2, V Morrissey 0-1, J Brenner 0-1, R Dwane 0-1, J Barrett 0-1, G Melville 0-1.		J Murphy 0-5, P Ryan 0-2, K Murphy 0-1, G McCarthy 0-1.	Referee: W Horgan (Brian Dillons)

16 September 2001 Quarter-final replay	Na Piarsaigh	1-07 - 0-13	Castlelyons	Páirc Uí Chaoimh, Cork
	R Sweeney 1-0, Mark Mullins 0-3, G Fitzgerald 0-2, S O'Sullivan 0-1, Mick Mullins 0-1.		E Fitzgerald 0-4, T McCarthy 0-4, D Wallace 0-2, S Cotter 0-1, P Cashman 0-1, C McGann 0-1.

=== Semi-finals ===
2 September 2001 Semi-final	Imokilly	4-20 - 2-14	Newtownshandrum	Páirc Uí Chaoimh, Cork
	J Deane 2-5, N McCarthy 2-3, M Landers 0-5, B Coleman 0-3, J O'Driscoll 0-2, V Morrissey 0-1, R Dwane 0-1.		B O'Connor 1-6, J O'Connor 1-2, P Mulcahy 0-3, D Mulcahy 0-1, JP King 0-1, I Kelleher 0-1.	Referee: K Healy (Ballymartle)

22 September 2001 Semi-final	Blackrock	3-18 - 1-08	Castlelyons	Páirc Uí Chaoimh, Cork
	B O'Keeffe 1-6, A Browne 1-4, D Cashman 1-0, B Hennebrey 0-3, A Coughlan 0-2, L Meaney 0-2, D Gosnell 0-1.		E Fitzgerald 0-5, J Molloy 1-0, T McCarthy 0-3.	Referee: D Kirwan (Éire Óg)

=== Final ===
6 October 2001 Final	Blackrock	4-08 - 2-07	Imokilly	Páirc Uí Chaoimh, Cork
	A Browne 3-8 (0-6 from frees); D Gosnell 1-0.	Report	M Landers 2-2 (2-2 from frees); N McCarthy 0-3; J Deane 0-2 (0-1 from free).	Referee: K Healy (Ballymartle)

== Championship statistics ==
=== Top scorers ===
Overall

Rank	Player	Club	Tally	Total	Matches	Average
1	Ben O'Connor	Newtownshandrum	6-29	47	5	9.40
2	Alan Browne	Blackrock	5-25	40	5	8.00
3	Joe Deane	Imokilly	4-23	35	5	7.00
3	John Murphy	Sarsfields	3-26	35	4	8.75
4	Mark Mullins	Na Piarsaigh	1-28	31	6	5.16
5	Johnny Enright	UCC	1-24	27	3	9.00
6	Neil Ronan	Ballyhea	2-19	25	2	12.50
7	Eoin Fitzgerald	Castlelyons	1-21	24	5	4.80
8	Timmy McCarthy	Castlelyons	2-17	23	5	4.60
9	Kevin Murray	Muskerry	3-10	19	2	9.50
9	Niall McCarthy	Imokilly	3-10	19	5	3.80

In a single game

Rank	Player	Club	Tally	Total	Opposition
1	Alan Browne	Blackrock	3-08	17	Imokilly
2	John Murphy	Sarsfields	3-06	15	CIT
2	Neil Ronan	Ballyhea	2-09	15	Midleton
3	Kevin Murray	Muskerry	3-05	14	Castlelyons
4	Johnny Enright	UCC	1-10	13	Blackrock
5	Ben O'Connor	Newtownshandrum	2-06	12	Seandún
5	Ben O'Connor	Newtownshandrum	2-05	11	St. Finbarr's
5	Joe Deane	Imokilly	2-05	11	Newtownshandrum
5	Ben O'Connor	Newtownshandrum	1-08	11	Glen Rovers
6	John Corcoran	Erin's Own	1-07	10	Sarsfields
6	Joe Deane	Imokilly	0-10	10	Cloyne
6	Neil Ronan	Ballyhea	0-10	10	Sarsfields
