= Seán McCarthy (hurler) =

Irish hurler

Personal information
- Native name: Seán Mac Carthaigh (Irish)
- Nickname: Seánie
- Born: 8 February 1966 (age 60) Ballinhassig, County Cork, Ireland
- Occupations: Bar and restaurant owner
- Height: 5 ft 8 in (173 cm)

Sport
- Sport: Hurling
- Position: Right wing-back
Clubs
- Years: Club
- Ballinhassig; Carrigdhoun
Club titles
- Cork titles: 0
Inter-county*
| Years | County | Apps (scores) |
| 1986–1996 | Cork | 16 (0–13) |
Inter-county titles
- Munster titles: 2
- All-Irelands: 1
- NHL: 1
- All Stars: 1
- *Inter County team apps and scores correct as of 16:17, 8 July 2015.

Seán McCarthy (born 8 February 1966) is an Irish retired hurler who played as a right wing-back for the Cork senior team.

Born in Ballinhassig, County Cork, along with brothers Damien who was on cork minor, under-21 intermediate, Denis, Drew and his sister Marion who was on cork camogie. McCarthy first arrived on the inter-county scene at the age of eighteen when he first linked up with the Cork minor team before later joining the under-21 and junior sides. He made his senior debut during the 1986–87 league. McCarthy subsequently became a regular member of the starting fifteen and won one All-Ireland medal, two Munster medals and one National Hurling League medal. He was an All-Ireland runner-up on one occasion.

As a member of the Munster inter-provincial team, McCarthy never won Railway Cup medal. At club level he played with Ballinhassig and divisional side Carrigdhoun.

Throughout his career McCarthy made 16 championship appearances. His retirement came following the conclusion of the 1996 championship.

== Playing career ==
=== Club ===
McCarthy began his club hurling as a goalkeeper with the Ballinhassig under-12 team. He was later moved to the half-back line where he won an under-14 championship medal.

For most of his career Ballinhassig operated at junior level, with McCarthy winning several divisional championship medals.

=== Inter-county ===
McCarthy first played for Cork on the minor team on 18 April 1984 in a 1–18 to 3–4 Munster quarter-final defeat of Kerry. He was moved to centre-back the following year before being dropped to the substitutes' bench in his final year as a minor in 1983.

In 1986 McCarthy joined the Cork under-21 team, however, his two-year tenure in this grade ended without success.

By this stage McCarthy had also joined the Cork junior team. In 1987 he won a Munster medal following a 2–16 to 1–9 defeat of Tipperary. On 25 July 1987 Cork faced Wexford in the All-Ireland decider. A 3–11 to 2–13 score line gave Cork the victory and secured an All-Ireland medal for McCarthy.

McCarthy was a panellist of the senior team in Cork's All-Ireland victory in 1986 after defeating Galway 4-13 to 2-15. After making his senior debut in a National Hurling League game in 1987, McCarthy made his senior championship debut on 20 May 1990 in a 3–17 to 3–7 Munster quarter-final defeat of Kerry. He later won a Munster medal that year following a 4–16 to 2–14 defeat of Tipperary. The subsequent All-Ireland final on 2 September 1990 pitted Cork against Galway for the second time in four years. Galway were once again the red-hot favourites and justified this tag by going seven points ahead in the opening thirty-five minutes thanks to a masterful display by Joe Cooney. Cork fought back with an equally expert display by captain Tomás Mulcahy. The game was effectively decided on an incident which occurred midway through the second half when Cork goalkeeper Ger Cunningham blocked a point-blank shot from Martin Naughton with his nose. The umpires gave no 65-metre free, even though he clearly deflected it out wide. Cork went on to win a high-scoring and open game of hurling by 5–15 to 2–21 giving McCarthy an All-Ireland medal.

Cork surrendered their titles in 1991, however, McCarthy claimed his second Munster medal in 1992 following a 1–22 to 3–11 of Limerick. On 6 September 1992 Cork faced Kilkenny in the All-Ireland decider. At half-time Cork were two points ahead, however, two second-half goals by John Power and Michael "Titch" Phelan supplemented a first-half D. J. Carey penalty which gave Kilkenny a 3–10 to 1–12 victory.

McCarthy won a National Hurling League in 1993 following a 3–11 to 1–12 defeat of Wexford after a second replay of the final. He remained a regular on the team until he retired following Cork's early championship exit in 1996.

== Honours ==
=== Player ===
Cork

- All-Ireland Senior Hurling Championship (1): 1986, 1990
- Munster Senior Hurling Championship (2): 1986, 1990, 1992
- National Hurling League (1): 1992–93
- All-Ireland Junior Hurling Championship (1): 1987
- Munster Junior Hurling Championship (1): 1987
