= Aidan Dorgan =

Irish Gaelic football player, now manager

Personal information
- Native name: Aodán Dorgáin (Irish)
- Born: 1973 (age 52–53) Grenagh, County Cork, Ireland
- Height: 5 ft 8 in (173 cm)

Sport
- Sport: Gaelic football
- Position: Left corner-forward
Club
- Years: Club
- Grenagh
Club titles
- Cork titles: 0
Inter-county*
Years	County	Apps (scores)
1996-2001	Cork	11 (2-12)
Inter-county titles
- Munster titles: 1
- All-Irelands: 0
- NFL: 1
- All Stars: 0
- *Inter County team apps and scores correct as of 18:05, 6 May 2019.

Aidan Dorgan (born 1973) is an Irish Gaelic football manager and former player who played for Mid Cork club Grenagh. He played for the Cork senior football team for five years, during which time he usually lined out in the forwards.

== Honours ==
Cork

- Munster Senior Football Championship (1): 1999
- National Football League (1): 1998-99
