= Walter T. Burke =

Massachusetts politician (1911–2007)

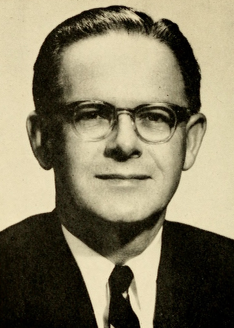

Member of the Massachusetts House of Representatives from the 54th Middlesex district
- In office 1959–1978

Personal details
- Born: November 26, 1911 Natick, Massachusetts, US
- Died: March 14, 2007 (aged 95)
- Education: Harvard College (BA); Harvard Law School (LLB)

Walter T. Burke (November 26, 1911– March 14, 2007) was an American politician who was the member of the Massachusetts House of Representatives from the 54th Middlesex district.
