= Stephen Grehan =

Irish hurler

Personal information
- Native name: Stiofán Ó Gréacháin (Irish)
- Born: 30 December 1971 (age 54) Johnstown, County Kilkenny, Ireland
- Occupation: Soldier
- Height: 6 ft 2 in (188 cm)

Sport
- Sport: Hurling
- Position: Left corner-forward
Club
- Years: Club
- Fenians
Club titles
- Kilkenny titles: 0
Inter-county
| Years | County | Apps (scores) |
| 1999-2003 | Kilkenny | 8 (0-7) |
Inter-county titles
- Leinster titles: 3
- All-Irelands: 0
- NHL: 1
- All Stars: 0

Stephen Grehan (born 30 December 1971) is an Irish retired hurler who played as a left corner-forward for the Kilkenny senior team.

Grehan joined the team during the 1999 championship and was a regular member of the team until his retirement from inter-county hurling after four seasons. During that time he won three Leinster winners' medals and one National Hurling League winners' medal.

At club level Grehan played with the Fenians club.
