= 2001 Cork Intermediate Hurling Championship =

Irish hurling competition

- Dates: 28 April 2001 – 4 November 2001
- Teams: 26
- Sponsor: TSB Bank
- Champions: Killeagh (1st title); Ger Scully (captain); Willie Kearney (manager)
- Runners-up: Mallow; Jack Russell (manager)

Tournament statistics
- Matches played: 46
- Goals scored: 124 (2.7 per match)
- Points scored: 1013 (22.02 per match)
- Top scorer(s): Joe Deane (5-48)

The 2001 Cork Intermediate Hurling Championship was the 92nd staging of the Cork Intermediate Hurling Championship since its establishment by the Cork County Board in 1909. The draw for the opening round fixtures took place on 10 December 2000. The championship began on 28 April 2001 and ended on 4 November 2001.

On 4 November 2001, Killeagh won the championship after a 3–09 to 2–08 defeat of Mallow in a final replay. It remains their only championship title in the grade.

Killeagh's Joe Deane was the championship's top scorer with 5-48.

== Team changes ==
=== To Championship ===
Promoted from the Cork Junior A Hurling Championship

- Nemo Rangers

=== From Championship ===
Promoted to the Cork Senior Hurling Championship

- Douglas

== Results ==
=== First round ===
28 April 2001 First round	St. Vincent's	1-10 - 3-14	Youghal	St. Catherine's Park
	D O'Callaghan 0-8, D McCarthy 1-0, A Murphy 0-2, JP Murphy 0-1.		M Ó Laochadha 2-0, E Coleman 0-5, BN Hogan 1-0, B Coleman 0-3, D Ring 0-3, JP Joyce 0-1, O O'Brien 0-1.

4 May 2001 First round	Carrigtwohill	1-16 - 3-11	Killeagh	Castlmartyr Grounds
	D Helay 0-8, Seán O'Farrell 1-3, N McCarthy 0-3, Séamus O'Farrell 0-1, J Barrett 0-1.		M Landers 1-4, L Collins 1-1, A Leahy 1-0,

5 May 2001 First round	Mallow	5-09 - 2-08	Cobh	Rathcormac
	J Hayes 2-0, R O'Connell 0-5, P Dineen 1-1, T O'Riordan 1-1, M Buckley 1-0, R Sheehan 0-2.		D Barrett 1-2, R Meaney 1-1, P Looney 0-2, S Donaghy 0-2, D Meaney 0-1.

5 May 2001 First round	Aghada	1-12 - 1-13	Argideen Rangers	Páirc Uí Rinn
	R Lewis 0-7, V Morrissey 1-3, D Devoy 0-1, P O'Neill 0-1.		M Walsh 1-8, M O'Callaghan 0-3, B Harte 0-2.

6 May 2000 First round	Valley Rovers	0-14 - 2-13	Delanys	Crosshaven
	E Collins 0-7, M Kelleher 0-2, J Burke 0-2, A Crowley 0-1, A Quirke 0-1, J Hurley 0-1.		P O'Connell 1-1, M O'Driscoll 1-1, K Foley 0-3, B Egan 0-3, J Egan 0-2, K Egan 0-1, M McElhinney 0-1, P Finnegan 0-1.

6 May 2001 First round	Kilbrittain	0-13 - 4-11	Cloughduv	Ballinhassig
	A Hayes 0-4, E Sheehy 0-4, D O'Connell 0-3, N Crowley 0-1, V O'Brien 0-1.		K Murray 2-3, T Barry-Murphy 1-2, J Barry-Murphy 1-0, D Corkery 0-3, S Prenderville 0-2, P Dunlea 0-1.

6 May 2001 First round	Bride Rovers	1-08 - 2-08	Aghabullogue	Páirc Uí Chaoimh
	P Murphy 1-0, J O'Driscoll 0-3, T Broderick 0-2, N Fitzgerald 0-1, S Ryan 0-1, B Murphy 0-1.		F Foley 0-7, D Kiely 1-0, D Murphy 1-0, J McSweeney 0-1.

12 May 2001 First round	Bandon	0-13 - 1-10	Ballymartle	Kilbrittain
	D O'Donoghue 0-6, D Burke 0-2, K Hurley 0-1, A O'Sullivan 0-1, J O'Regan 0-1, J Ahern 0-1, J Nyhan 0-1.		R Dwyer 1-4, P Coughlan 0-2, G Cummins 0-2, P Dwyer 0-1, J Tobin 0-1.

12 May 2001 First round	Inniscarra	0-16 - 0-11	St. Finbarr's	Cloughduv
	S Holland 0-6, D O'Riordan 0-5, N Hegarty 0-2, J Holland 0-1, R Wall 0-1, J O'Mahony.		J McCarthy 0-5, A Furey 0-2, E Fitzpatrick 0-2, K McTiernan 0-1, T Doolin 0-1.

12 May 2001 First round	Milford	0-07 - 1-13	Blarney	Mourne Abbey
	M Morrissey 0-4, N Geary 0-2, R Geary 0-1.		N Murphy 1-2, A Shanahan 0-5, J Downey 0-2, J Hurley 0-1, JP Kearney 0-1, J Hughes 0-1, P Aherne 0-1.

13 May 2001 First round	Éire Óg	0-09 - 0-11	Glen Rovers	Cloughduv
	T Cronin 0-7, M Long 0-1, F Sheehan 0-1.		B O'Connell 0-3, R O'Riordan 0-2, S O'Brien 0-2, A Golding 0-2, L Galvin 0-1, G O'Connor 0-1.

18 May 2001 First round	Newcestown	1-09 - 0-09	Tracton	Riverstick
	C O'Donovan 0-4, P Condon 1-0, P Kenneally 0-3, E O'Donovan 0-1, C Crowley 0-1.		F Walsh 0-4, D Walsh 0-2, J Kingston 0-2, M Desmond 0-1.

25 May 2001 First round	Nemo Rangers	1-09 - 2-06	Na Piarsaigh	Ballinlough
	M Cronin 1-2, J Coogan 0-2, W Morgan 0-2, S Calnan 0-2, I Murphy 0-1.		K Butterworth 1-1, A O'Leary 1-0, M O'Sullivan 0-3, K O'Sullivan 0-1, T Coleman 0-1.

27 May 2001 First round replay	Bandon	2-12 - 1-18	Ballymartle	Kilbrittain
	D O'Donoghue 1-7, J Burke 1-0, D Burke 0-2, K Hurley 0-2, A Johnson 0-1.		G Cummins 0-10, C Lordan 1-2, C Sheehan 0-2, P Coughlan 0-2, J Tobin 0-1, G Walsh 0-1.

2 June 2001 First round replay	Nemo Rangers	3-11 - 0-07	Na Piarsaigh	Ballinlough
	W Morgan 1-5, A Cronin 1-2, M Cronin 1-2, S Calnan 0-1, J Coogan 0-1.		M O'Sullivan 0-4, D Gardiner 0-2, K O'Sullivan 0-1.

=== Second round ===
1 June 2001 Second round	St. Vincent's	1-12 - 0-15	Bandon	Páirc Liam Mhic Cárthaigh
	A Buckley 0-5, C Hartnett 1-0, JP Murphy 0-2, K Goulding 0-2, S Rea 0-1, T O'Mahony 0-1, F Murphy 0-1.		D O'Donoghue 0-8, K Hurley 0-3, J O'Regan 0-2, A O'Donovan 0-1, D Burke 0-1.

2 June 2000 Second round	Aghada	0-18 - 3-08	Milford	Moore Park
	V Morrissey 0-6, R Lewis 0-6, JP O'Connor 0-2, T O'Keeffe 0-1, D Devoy 0-1, P O'Neill 0-1, R Dwane 0-1.		M Morrissey 2-4, G Sheehan 1-2, P Buckley 0-1, R Geary 0-1.

2 June 2001 Second round	Éire Óg	2-17 - 0-11	Carrigtwohill	Kilbarry
	T Cronin 0-10, K Murphy 1-2, F Sheehan 1-2, B Corkery 0-1, K Shanahan 0-1, M Sheehan 0-1.		D Healy 0-6, N McCarthy 0-3, L Barry 0-1, Seán O'Farrell 0-1.

2 June 2001 Second round	Valley Rovers	0-13 - 1-07	Kilbrittain	Charlie Hurley Park
	E Collins 0-4, A Crowley 0-3, E Newman 0-2, N McCarthy 0-2, A Quirke 0-1, M Kelleher 0-1.		D O'Connell 1-2, P Sexton 0-2, D McSweeney 0-1, O Sexton 0-1, N Crowley 0-1.

3 June 2001 Second round	St. Finbarr's	0-07 - 1-09	Bride Rovers	Watergrasshill
	A Furey 0-6, S Fitzgerald 0-1.		J O'Driscoll 0-4, D Ryan 1-0, J O'Dowd 0-1, T Broderick 0-1, S Ryan 0-1, J Murphy 0-1, N Fitzgerald 0-1.

9 June 2001 Second round	Na Piarsaigh	4-11 - 2-06	Tracton	Carrigaline
	G Fitzgerald 1-1, T O'Sullivan 1-1, B O'Sullivan 1-1, A O'Leary 1-0, S O'Sullivan 0-3, K O'Sullivan 0-2, C Fitzgerald 0-2, D O'Sullivan 0-1.		D Walsh 2-0, J Kingston 0-2, M Desmond 0-2, B Barrett 0-1, K Lynch 0-1.

10 June 2001 Second round replay	St. Vincent's	1-16 - 2-12	Bandon	Páirc Liam Mhic Cárthaigh
	A Buckley 0-10, A McCarthy 1-0, S Rea 0-2, K Goulding 0-1, JP Murphy 0-1, C Hartnett 0-1, J Buckley 0-1.		C O'Donoghue 0-6, K Hurley 1-2, N O'Rourke 1-0, J Nyhan 0-3, J O'Regan 0-1.

- Cobh received a bye in this round.

=== Third round ===
30 June 2001 Third round	Ballymartle	1-16 - 1-10	Valley Rovers	Tracton
	G Cummins 1-10, P Coughlan 0-2, C Sheehan 0-1, M Tupper 0-1, J Tobin 0-1, R Dwyer 0-1.		E Collins 0-4, N McCarthy 1-0, M Kelleher 0-3, C O'Riordan 0-1, P O'Donovan 0-1, C O'Donovan 0-1.

7 July 2001 Third round	Newcestown	1-09 - 3-11	Killeagh	Páirc Uí Rinn
	C O'Sullivan 1-0, C O'Donovan 0-3, P Kenneally 0-2, S Twomey 0-1, P Condon 0-1, D McCarthy 0-1, P Crowley 0-1.		J Deane 2-4, Brendan Barry 1-0, L Collins 0-3, M Landers 0-1, Brian Barry 0-1, C Cronin 0-1, M Byrne 0-1.

8 July 2001 Third round	Inniscarra	3-11 - 2-06	Argideen Rangers	Charlie Hurley Park
	M O'Regan 2-1, D O'Riordan 1-2, S Holland 0-5, J Hogan 0-1, J O'Mahony 0-1, J Olden 0-1.		M Walsh 2-3, M O'Callaghan 0-2, M Foley 0-1.

8 July 2001 Third round	Bride Rovers	1-10 - 0-13	Aghada	Youghal
	J O'Driscoll 0-6, P Murphy 1-2, N Fitzgerald 0-1.		R Lewis 0-7, V Morrissey 0-4, T O'Keeffe 0-1, D Creedon 0-1.

8 July 2001 Third round	Mallow	2-12 - 0-07	Aghabullogue	Blarney
	P Dineen 2-0, R O'Connell 0-2, T O'Riordan 0-2, R Sheehan 0-2, S Buckley 0-2, B Carey 0-2, R Galvin 0-1, J Walsh 0-1.		P Kelleher 0-2, F Foley 0-2, E Twomey 0-1, J McSweeney 0-1, D Twomey 0-1.

14 July 2001 Third round	Éire Óg	0-13 - 1-12	Cobh	Páirc Uí Rinn
	T Cronin 0-9, J Crowley 0-1, J Malone 0-1, M Sheehan 0-1, P Flynn 0-1.		P Sloane 0-7, D O'Rourke 1-0, D Barrett 0-2, R Meaney 0-1, J Young 0-1, S Donnacha 0-1.

14 July 2001 Third round	St. Vincent's	3-11 - 2-05	Glen Rovers	Bishopstown
	A Buckley 1-7, J Buckley 2-1, JP Murphy 0-1, D O'Callaghan 0-1, T O'Mahony 0-1.		S Kennefick 0-4, B McSweeney 1-0, D Cronin 1-0, S Hackett 0-1.

14 July 2001 Third round	Blarney	0-13 - 0-13	Delanys	Ballincollig
	A Shanahan 0-6, D McCarthy 0-1, H Hughes 0-1, J Downey 0-1, J Hurley 0-1, D O'Donovan 0-1, R McNamara 0-1, C Sheehan 0-1.		K Egan 0-4, J Egan 0-3, G Healy 0-2, D Quinlan 0-2, B Egan 0-1, M McElhinney 0-1.

14 July 2001 Third round	Youghal	2-12 - 1-03	Cloughduv	Páirc Uí Rinn
	E Coleman 0-7, P Joyce 1-1, S O'Connell 1-0, B Hogan 0-2, O O'Brien 0-1, A FOley 0-1.		K Murray 1-2, G Shanahan 0-1.

22 July 2001 Third round replay	Blarney	2-13 - 1-15	Delanys	Ballincollig
	A Shanahan 1-10, R McNamara 1-1, E McCarthy 0-1, J Hughes 0-1.		M McElhinney 1-4, B Egan 0-6, D McElhinney 0-2, D Quinlan 0-1, T Kiely 0-1, K Egan 0-1.

28 July 2001 Third round	Na Piarsaigh	0-04 - 2-10	Nemo Rangers	Páirc Uí Rinn
	D O'Sullivan 0-3, G Pepper 0-1.		M Cronin 1-2, S Calnan 1-2, W Morgan 0-3, J Masters 0-2, B Twomey 0-1.

29 July 2001 Third round replay	Bride Rovers	1-05 - 3-10	Aghada	Youghal
	T Broderick 1-1, J O'Driscoll 0-4.		R Lewis 1-5, V Morrissey 1-2, R Dwane 1-1, T O'Keeffe 0-1, M Lewis 0-1.

=== Round 4 ===
3 August 2001 Third four	Ballymartle	2-11 - 2-14	Killeagh	Páirc Uí Rinn
	G Cummins 1-5, A McCarthy 1-0, R Dwyer 0-3, M Allen 0-1, M Tupper 0-1, K Lordan 0-1.		J Deane 0-6, L Collins 1-1, M Landers 1-0, J Brenner 0-2, B Walsh 0-2, G Scully 0-1, M Byrne 0-1, B Barry 0-1.

11 August 2011 Third four	St. Vincent's	0-09 - 0-12	Blarney	Páirc Uí Rinn
	A Buckley 0-6, JP Murphy 0-1, S Rea 0-1, C Hartnett 0-1.		A Shanahan 0-4, J Hurley 0-3, J Downey 0-3, D McCarthy 0-1, R McNamara 0-1,

=== Quarter-finals ===
4 August 2001 Quarter-final	Mallow	2-15 - 3-12	Inniscarra	Páirc Uí Rinn
	T O'Riordan 2-1, F McCormack 0-5, R O'Connell 0-5, R Sheehan 0-2, P Dineen 0-2.		D Holland 1-2, D O'Riordan 1-2, S Holland 0-3, J O'Mahony 0-2, M O'Brien 0-1, J Carey 0-1, J Olden 0-1.

4 August 2001 Quarter-final	Aghada	3-15 - 1-09	Nemo Rangers	Riverstown Sportsfield
	V Morrissey 1-4, R Lewis 0-7, T O'Keeffe 1-1, R Dwane 1-0, D Creedon 0-2, G Melvin 0-1.		W Morgan 0-6, J Coogan 1-0, M Morgan 0-1, D Niblock 0-1, I Murphy 0-1.

8 August 2001 Quarter-final	Youghal	1-13 - 0-15	Cobh	St. Catherine's Park
	E Coleman 0-7, JP Joyce 1-0, O O'Brien 0-2, P Coyne 0-1, D Ring 0-1, M Walsh 0-1, F O'Sullivan 0-1.		P Sloane 0-10, R Meaney 0-3, G Morgan 0-1, V O'Rourke 0-1.

10 August 2001 Quarter-final replay	Mallow	3-12 - 1-12	Inniscarra	Páirc Uí Rinn
	F McCormack 2-2, J Hayes 1-2, R O'Connell 0-5, P Dineen 0-1, T O'Riordan 0-1, R Sheehan 0-1.		S Holland 0-6, D O'Riordan 1-1, J Hogan 0-1, J Olden 0-1, P O'Riordan 0-1, D O'Leary 0-1, J O'Mahony 0-1.

19 August 2001 Quarter-final	Killeagh	3-11 - 2-14	Blarney	Páirc Uí Rinn
	J Deane 1-8, S Scully 1-0, B Walsh 1-0, M Landers 0-2, B Barry 0-1.		A Shanahan 0-8, D McCarthy 1-1, N Murphy 1-0, D McSweeney 0-3, R McNamara 0-2.

25 August 2001 Quarter-final replay	Killeagh	4-19 - 0-12	Blarney	Páirc Uí Rinn
	J Deane 1-10, L Collins 2-0, Brian Barry 1-0, Brendan Barry 0-2, M Landers 0-2, B Walsh 0-2, M Byrne 0-2, J Brenner 0-1.		A Shanahan 0-3, R McNamara 0-3, J Hughes 0-3, D McCarthy 0-1, D McSweeney 0-1, J Hurley 0-1.

=== Semi-finals ===
26 August 2001 Semi-final	Mallow	3-08 - 0-10	Aghada	Páirc Uí Rinn
	J Hayes 2-0, P Dineen 1-3, F McCormack 0-2, M McCormack 0-1, R O'Connell 0-1, R Willis 0-1.		R Lewis 0-5, T O'Keeffe 0-2, D Devoy 0-2, V Morrissey 0-1.

9 September 2001 Semi-final	Killeagh	1-11 - 0-07	Youghal	Fr. O'Neill Park
	J Deane 0-8, B Walsh 1-0, M Landers 0-2, B Barry 0-1.		E Coleman 0-4, P Coyne 0-1, B Coleman 0-1, JP Joyce 0-1.

=== Finals ===
21 October 2020 Final	Killeagh	1-14 - 1-14	Mallow	Páirc Uí Chaoimh
	J Deane 0-7, M Landers 1-2, L Collins 1-1, J Brenner 0-2, M Byrne 0-1, M Barry 0-1.		R Galvin 1-3, R O'Connell 0-4, P Dineen 0-4, J Hayes 1-0, F McCormack 0-2, M Buckley 0-1.	Referee: D Kirwan (Éire Óg)

4 November 2020 Final replay	Killeagh	3-09 - 2-08	Mallow	Páirc Uí Chaoimh
	J Deane 1-5, M Byrne 1-0, J Brenner 1-0, B Walsh 0-2, M Landers 0-1, Brendan Barry 0-1.		P Dineen 1-1, T O'Riordan 0-4, B Carey 1-0, R Galvin 0-2, M Buckley 0-1.	Referee: D Kirwan (Éire Óg)

== Championship statistics ==
=== Top scorers ===
Overall

Rank	Player	Club	Tally	Total	Matches	Average
1	Joe Deane	Killeagh	5-48	63	7	9.00
2	Richie Lewis	Aghada	1-37	40	6	6.66
3	Adrian Shanahan	Blarney	1-36	39	6	6.50
4	Ger Cummins	Ballymartle	2-27	33	4	8.25
5	Anthony Buckley	St. Vincent's	1-28	31	4	7.75
6	Darren O'Donoghue	Bandon	1-27	30	4	7.50
7	Vincent Morrissey	Aghada	3-20	29	6	4.83
8	Pa Dineen	Mallow	5-12	27	7	3.85
9	Mark Landers	Killeagh	3-14	23	8	2.87
9	Eoin Coleman	St. Vincent's	0-23	23	4	5.75

In a single game

Rank	Player	Club	Tally	Total	Opposition
1	Ger Cummins	Ballymartle	1-10	13	Valley Rovers
1	Adrian Shanahan	Blarney	1-10	13	Delanys
1	Joe Deane	Killeagh	1-10	13	Blarney
2	Michael Walsh	Argideen Rangers	1-08	11	Aghada
2	Joe Deane	Killeagh	1-08	11	Blarney
3	Michael Morrissey	Milford	2-04	10	Aghada
3	Joe Deane	Killeagh	2-04	10	Newcestown
3	Anthony Buckley	St. Vincent's	1-07	10	Glen Rovers
3	Darren O'Donoghue	Bandon	1-07	10	Ballymartle
3	Ger Cummins	Ballymartle	0-10	10	Bandon
3	Tim Cronin	Éire Óg	0-10	10	Carrightwohill
3	Anthony Buckley	St. Vincent's	0-10	10	Bandon
3	Pat Sloane	Cobh	0-10	10	Youghal
