= Joe Deane =

Irish hurler (born 1977)

Personal information
- Native name: Seosamh Ó Déin (Irish)
- Nickname: Deano
- Born: 15 November 1977 (age 48) Killeagh, County Cork, Ireland
- Occupation: Business manager with ACC Bank
- Height: 5 ft 7 in (170 cm)

Sport
- Sport: Hurling
- Position: Left corner-forward
Clubs
Years	Club	Apps (scores)
1994-2015 1995; 2000-2001 1996-1999	Killeagh; Imokilly; University College Cork	42 (6-248); 13 (10-57); 12 (5-46)
Club titles
- Cork titles: 0
College
- Years: College
- 1995–1999: University College Cork
College titles
- Fitzgibbon titles: 3
Inter-county*
Years	County	Apps (scores)
1996–2009	Cork	50 (10–237)
Inter-county titles
- Munster titles: 5
- All-Irelands: 3
- NHL: 1
- All Stars: 3
- *Inter County team apps and scores correct as of 23:50, 2 June 2018.

Joseph Deane (born 15 November 1977) is an Irish retired hurler who played for East Cork club Killeagh. He played for the Cork senior hurling team for 13 years, during which time he usually lined out as a left corner-forward. Diminutive in size but noted for his deadly accuracy in front of goal, Deane is regarded as one of Cork's all-time greatest and most popular players.

Deane began his hurling career at club level with Killeagh. He broke onto the club's top adult team as a 16-year-old in 1994 and enjoyed his first success the following year when the club won the 1995 Cork Junior Championship title. He later won a Cork Intermediate Championship title in 2001 and promotion to the top flight of Cork hurling. Deane made 68 championship appearances in three different grades of hurling for the club, while his early prowess also saw him selected for University College Cork, with whom he won three successive Fitzgibbon Cup titles, and the Imokilly divisional team.

At inter-county level, Deane was part of the successful Cork minor team that won the All-Ireland Championship in 1995 before later winning back-to-back All-Ireland Championships with the under-21 team in 1997 and 1998. He joined the Cork senior team in 1995. From his debut, Deane was ever-present as an inside forward and made a combined total of 117 National League and Championship appearances in a career that ended with his last game in 2008. During that time he was part of three All-Ireland Championship-winning teams – in 1999, 2004 and 2005. Deane also secured five Munster Championship medals and a National Hurling League medal. He announced his retirement from inter-county hurling on 20 April 2009.

Deane won his first All-Star in 1999, before claiming a further two All-Stars in 2000, 2003. He is currently Cork's third-highest championship scorer of all time, having scored 10-237 in 50 appearances. At inter-provincial level, Deane was selected to play in four championship campaigns with Munster, with his sole Railway Cup medal being won in 2000.

== Personal life ==
Deane was born in Killeagh, County Cork in November 1977. He attended St. Fergal's National School in Killeagh, before later completing his secondary schooling at Midleton CBS Secondary School.

His great-grandfather, Tom Mahony, as well as his close relations Seánie O'Leary and John Fitzgibbon, also enjoyed All-Ireland success with Cork.

Deane graduated from University College Cork with a BSc in finance and currently works as a Credit Manager with AIB in Cork.

== Playing career ==
=== Midleton CBS ===
During his secondary schooling at Midleton CBS Secondary School, Deane played in all grades of hurling before joining the college's senior hurling team in his final years. On 27 March 1994, he was named at right wing-forward for the Harty Cup final against the North Monastery. Marked by future inter-county teammate Seán Óg Ó hAilpín, Deane's side eventually lost the game by 1-09 to 0-04.

Deane was again included in the forwards when Midleton CBS reached a second successive Harty Cup final on 26 March 1995. He ended the game with a winners' medal following a 3-18 to 3-05 defeat of Lismore CBS.

=== University College Cork ===
During his studies at University College Cork Deane excelled at both football and Gaelic football. In 1996 he won an All-Ireland medal with the freshers football team while also lining out with the UCC hurling team. A 3–16 to 0–16 defeat of the University of Limerick in the decider gave Deane his first Fitzgibbon Cup medal.

In 1997 University College Cork hosted the inter-varsities championship and reached the final once again. A 0–14 to 1–8 defeat of the Garda College allowed UCC retain the title and give Deane a second Fitzgibbon Cup medal.

Deane added a third successive Fitzgibbon Cup medal to his collection in 1998, as UCC secured the three-in-a-row following a 2–17 to 0–13 defeat of the Waterford Institute of Technology.

=== Killeagh ===
In 1995 Deane was just out of the minor grade when he helped his club Killeagh to the final of the county junior championship. A 3–9 to 0–8 trouncing of Ballinhassig gave him his a Cork Junior Hurling Championship medal.

Deane also lined out with University College Cork in the county senior championship. In 1999 UCC faced Blackrock in the decider, however, a rout took place. Deane was limited to just three points as he was moved from full-forward to centre-forward and into corner-forward. A 3–17 to 0–8 defeat was the result.

In 2001 Deane tasted further success with Killeagh when the club faced Mallow in the county intermediate championship final. A 2–14 apiece draw was followed by an exciting replay which saw Deane score two key goals. A 3–9 to 2–8 victory gave Killeagh the title and gave Deane a championship medal.

=== Cork ===
==== Minor and under 21 ====
Deane first lined out for Cork as a dual player with the minor teams during the 1995 season. He made his first appearance with the Cork minor football team on 26 April and scored 1-02 from left corner-forward in a 4-20 to 1-03 defeat of Limerick in the Munster Championship. Deane was again at left corner-forward for the Munster final against Tipperary on 23 July, however, his contribution was limited to just a single point in the 2-06 to 0-10 defeat. By this stage Deane had also made his first appearance for the Cork minor hurling team. He scored 1-01 from full-forward in a 2-14 to 1-03 Munster Championship defeat of Limerick on 28 June 1995. He was again at full-forward for the Munster final on 9 July and collected a winners' medal after scoring two points in the 3-18 to 0-10 defeat of Waterford. On 3 September, Deane was selected at full-forward for the All-Ireland final against Kilkenny. He scored 1-02 in the 2-10 to 1-02 victory in what was his last game in the minor grade.

On 17 July 1996, Deane made his first appearance for the Cork under-21 team. He scored 2-04 from left corner-forward in a 2-18 to 1-12 defeat of Tipperary in the Munster Championship. On 25 July, Dean won a Munster Championship medal after top scoring for Cork with 2-05 in a 3-16 to 2-07 defeat of Clare in the final.

After scoring 2-03 against Kerry in Cork's opening Munster Championship on 18 June 1997, Deane missed the rest of the provincial championship through injury. In spite of this he claimed a second Munster Championship medal on 30 July when he was listed amongst the substitute in Cork's 1-11 to 0-13 defeat of Tipperary. On 21 October, Deane was restored to the left corner-forward position for the All-Ireland final against Galway.

On 23 August 1998, Deane won a third successive Munster Championship medal after scoring 1-07 from left corner-forward in a 3-18 to 1-10 defeat of Tipperary in the final. He was again named at left corner-forward for the All-Ireland final against Galway on 20 September. Deane scored seven points and collected a second successive winners' medal following the 2-15 to 2-10 victory.

==== Senior ====
===== Beginnings =====
Deane was just 18 years and 4 days old when he made his first appearance for the Cork senior team. He scored a point from play in Cork's 2-16 to 1-13 National League defeat of Kerry on 19 November 1995. He was subsequently included on Cork's 1996 championship panel and made his debut on 26 May 1996 in a 3–18 to 1–08 Munster quarter-final defeat by Limerick.

On 17 May 1998, Deane was selected at left corner-forward when Cork faced Waterford in the National League final. He scored three points from play in the 2-14 to 0-13 victory. It was his first silverware at senior level with Cork.

After a seven-year hiatus Cork claimed the provincial title in 1999. A 1–15 to 0–14 defeat of three-in-a-row hopefuls Clare gave goal-scorer Deane his first Munster medal. Cork later faced Kilkenny in the All-Ireland decider on 12 September 1999. In a dour contest played on a wet day, Cork trailed by 0–5 to 0–4 after a low-scoring first half. Kilkenny increased the pace after the interval, pulling into a four-point lead. Cork moved up a gear and through Deane, Ben O'Connor and Seánie McGrath Cork scored five unanswered points. Kilkenny could only manage one more score – a point from a Henry Shefflin free – and Cork held out to win by 0–13 to 0–12. It was Deane's first All-Ireland medal. He later won his first All-Star.

Deane won a second Munster medal in 2000, as Cork retained their title following a 0–23 to 3–12 defeat of Tipperary. In spite of surrendering their All-Ireland crown to Offaly at the semi-final stage, Deane was later honoured by collecting a second All-Star award.

Embarrassing defeats for Cork in 2001 and 2002 saw the team reach rock bottom and call a players' strike just before Christmas in 2002. Deane played a huge role as one of the main spokesmen in representing the welfare of his fellow players. Had the strike failed it could have meant the end of his and his teammates' careers, however, in the end the county board relented and met the demands.

===== Back-to-back successes =====
In 2003 Cork's players were vindicated in taking a stand as the team won the provincial decider following an exciting 3–16 to 3–12 defeat of Waterford. The subsequent All-Ireland final on 14 September 2003 saw Cork face Kilkenny for the first time in four years. Both teams remained level for much of the game, exchanging tit-for-tat scores. A Setanta Ó hAilpín goal gave Cork the advantage, however, a Martin Comerford goal five minutes from the end settled the game as Kilkenny went on to win by 1–14 to 1–11. Deane later added a third All-Star to his collection.

After facing a narrow 3–16 to 1–21 defeat by Waterford in one of the greatest Munster finals of all-time in 2004, Cork worked their way through the qualifiers and lined out against Kilkenny in the All-Ireland decider on 12 September 2004. The game was expected to be a classic, however, a rain-soaked day made conditions difficult as Kilkenny aimed to secure a third successive championship. The first half was a low-scoring affair and provided little excitement for fans, however, the second half saw Cork completely take over. For the last twenty-three minutes Cork scored nine unanswered points and went on to win the game by 0–17 to 0–9. It was Deane's second All-Ireland medal.

Deane won his fourth Munster medal in 2005 following a 1–21 to 1–16 defeat of old rivals Tipperary. On 11 September 2005 Cork faced surprise semi-final winners Galway in the All-Ireland decider. A sixteenth minute Ben O'Connor goal gave Cork the platform needed to withstand a Galway fightback through a Damien Hayes goal, which brought Galway within a point with twenty-one minutes remaining. Galway failed to score for the last ten minutes as Cork claimed a 1–21 to 1–16 score line. It was Deane's third All-Ireland medal.

Cork retained their provincial crown in 2006. Goalkeeper Donal Óg Cusack stopped two certain goals in the first half to help Cork to a 2–14 to 1–4 victory and a fifth Munster medal for Deane. On 3 September 2006 Cork had the opportunity to become the first side in nearly thirty years to secure three successive All-Ireland champions as they faced Kilkenny in the decider. Like previous encounters neither side took a considerable lead, however, Kilkenny had a vital goal from Aidan Fogarty. Cork were in arrears coming into the final few minutes, however, Ben O'Connor scored a late goal for Cork. It was too little too late as the Cats denied Cork on a score line of 1–16 to 1–13.

===== Cancer battle =====
In the build-up to the All-Ireland final Deane had noticed a hardening of one of his testicles but ignored it. By early October a noticeable swelling prompted a formal visit to his doctor and within a few days of that visit the testicle was two or three times the size of the other one. A CT scan revealed that it was cancerous and that small traces had also shown up in his stomach. While rumours about his illness had been circulating in hurling circles for several weeks, Deane refused to confirm the nature of his illness until after the surgery. Good-will cards flooded in from many of his past and present foes on the playing field, including the entire Tipperary team. Deane underwent surgery at the Bons Secours hospital in Cork in November and the possibility of chemotherapy was raised. On a visit to his oncologist it was revealed that the traces of cancer in the blood had dissipated, and there would be no need for treatment.

Deane returned to competitive inter-county hurling on 21 January 2007 when he was introduced as a substitute in a 2–10 to 1–11 defeat of the Cork Institute of Technology in the Waterford Crystal Cup.

===== Retirement =====
In spite of having contested the four previous All-Ireland finals, Cork's fortunes took a downturn over the following few years. Deane played his last championship game for Cork on 10 August 2008 in a 1–23 to 0–17 All-Ireland semi-final defeat by Kilkenny.

A winter of discontent followed for the Cork senior hurling team following the unwanted reappointment of Gerald McCarthy as manager. Following a strike by the players McCarthy eventually stepped down in March 2009. In spite of being one of the striking players, Deane decided to retire from inter-county hurling on 20 April 2009.

=== Munster ===
Deane represented Munster in the inter-provincial series of games. He was first called up to the provincial team in 1999, however, it was 2000 before he enjoyed success. A 3–15 to 2–15 defeat of Leinster gave Deane his sole Railway Cup medal.

== Career statistics ==
=== Club ===
Team	Year	Cork JHC	
Team	Year	Apps	Score
Killeagh	1994	—	
Killeagh	1995	3	2-17
Killeagh	Total	3	2-17
Killeagh	Year	Cork IHC	
Killeagh	Year	Apps	Score
Killeagh	1996	1	2-02
Killeagh	1997	5	0-22
Killeagh	1998	4	3-24
Killeagh	1999	1	2-04
Killeagh	2000	4	3-21
Killeagh	2001	8	5-52
Killeagh	Total	23	15-125
Killeagh	Year	Cork SHC	
Killeagh	Year	Apps	Score
Killeagh	2002	5	1-32
Killeagh	2003	2	0-03
Killeagh	2004	2	1-17
Killeagh	2005	2	1-14
Killeagh	2006	3	1-10
Killeagh	2007	3	0-14
Killeagh	2008	3	0-23
Killeagh	2009	2	0-12
Killeagh	2010	3	0-22
Killeagh	2011	3	1-20
Killeagh	2012	3	1-22
Killeagh	2013	4	0-21
Killeagh	2014	4	0-27
Killeagh	2015	3	0-11
Killeagh	Total	42	6-248
Career total		68	23-390

=== Division ===
Team	Year	Cork SHC	
Team	Year	Apps	Score
Imokilly	1995	3	0-02
Imokilly	Total	3	0-02
University College Cork	1996	2	1-04
University College Cork	1997	1	0-07
University College Cork	1998	3	1-09
University College Cork	1999	6	3-26
University College Cork	Total	12	5-46
Imokilly	2000	5	6-32
Imokilly	2001	5	4-23
Imokilly	Total	10	10-55
Career total		25	15-103

=== Inter-county ===
Team	Year	National League			Munster		All-Ireland		Total	
Team	Year	Division	Apps	Score	Apps	Score	Apps	Score	Apps	Score
Cork Minor	1995	—			2	1-03	2	2-04	4	3-07
Cork Minor	Total	—			2	1-03	2	2-04	4	3-07
Cork U21	1996	—			2	4-09	1	0-00	3	4-09
Cork U21	1997	—			1	2-03	2	2-02	3	4-05
Cork U21	1998	—			3	6-18	2	2-12	5	8-30
Cork U21	Total	—			6	12-30	5	4-14	11	16-44
Cork	1995-96	Division 1	4	1-01	1	0-00	—		5	1-01
Cork	1997	Division 2	6	5-19	1	0-02	—		7	5-21
Cork	1998	Division 1B	7	3-30	2	0-14	—		9	3-44
Cork	1999	Division 1B	6	3-38	2	1-11	2	0-13	10	4-62
Cork	2000	Division 1B	5	0-12	3	1-18	1	0-10	9	1-40
Cork	2001	Division 1B	6	2-24	1	0-04	—		7	2-28
Cork	2002	Division 1B	4	2-17	1	0-03	2	1-07	7	3-27
Cork	2003	Division 1B	7	3-31	2	2-12	3	2-17	12	7-60
Cork	2004	Division 1B	6	1-05	3	1-17	4	0-19	13	2-41
Cork	2005	Division 1B	5	3-23	2	1-08	3	0-10	10	4-41
Cork	2006	Division 1A	3	2-19	2	0-17	3	0-15	8	2-51
Cork	2007	Division 1A	6	0-21	2	0-08	5	0-26	13	0-55
Cork	2008	Division 1A	2	0-00	1	0-00	4	1-06	7	1-06
Cork	Total		67	25-240	23	6-114	27	4-123	117	35-477
Career total			67	25-240	31	19-147	34	10-141	132	54-528

=== Inter-provincial ===
Team	Year	Railway Cup	
Team	Year	Apps	Score
Munster	1999	1	0-08
Munster	2000	2	1-11
Munster	2001	—	
Munster	2002	2	2-04
Munster	2003	—	
Munster	2004	2	1-02
Career total		7	4-25

== Honours ==
=== Team ===
Midleton CBS

- Dr Harty Cup (1): 1995

University College Cork

- Fitzgibbon Cup (3): 1996, 1997, 1998
- All-Ireland Freshers Football Championship (1): 1996

Killeagh

- Cork Intermediate Hurling Championship (1): 2001
- Cork Junior Hurling Championship (1): 1995

Glenbower Rovers

- East Cork Junior A Football Championship (2): 2011, 2012

Cork

- All-Ireland Senior Hurling Championship (3): 1999, 2004, 2005
- Munster Senior Hurling Championship (5): 1999, 2000, 2003, 2005, 2006
- National Hurling League (1): 1998
- All-Ireland Under-21 Hurling Championship (2): 1997, 1998
- Munster Under-21 Hurling Championship (3): 1996, 1997, 1998
- All-Ireland Minor Hurling Championship (1): 1995
- Munster Minor Hurling Championship (1): 1995

Munster

- Railway Cup (1): 2000

=== Individual ===
Awards

- All-Star (3): 1999, 2000, 2003
- GAA/GPA Player of the Month (1): June 2006
- 125 greatest hurlers of the GAA: No. 101

Sporting positions
Preceded by Kieran Murphy	Cork Senior Hurling Captain; 2007	Succeeded by John Gardiner
