= Walter Burke (hurler) =

Irish hurler

Personal information
- Native name: Ualtar de Búrca (Irish)
- Born: 12 March 1981 (age 45) Mullinavat, County Kilkenny, Ireland
- Occupation: Farmer
- Height: 5 ft 11 in (180 cm)

Sport
- Sport: Hurling
- Position: Right corner-back
Club
- Years: Club
- Mullinavat
Club titles
- Kilkenny titles: 0
Inter-county
Years	County	Apps (scores)
2002–2004	Kilkenny	1 (0-00)
Inter-county titles
- Leinster titles: 0
- All-Irelands: 0
- NHL: 0
- All Stars: 0

Walter Martin Burke (born 12 March 1981) is an Irish hurler who played as a right corner-back for the Kilkenny senior team.
