= Killeagh GAA =

Gaelic games club in County Cork, Ireland

Killeagh
- Cilliath
- County: Cork
- Colours
- Grounds: Páirc Uí Chinnéide
- Coordinates: 51°56′23.29″N 8°00′07.52″W

Playing kits
Standard colours

Senior Club Championships
	All Ireland	Munster champions	Cork champions
Camogie:	1	5	5

Killeagh GAA is a Gaelic Athletic Association club located in Killeagh, County Cork, Ireland. The club is affiliated to the East Cork Board and the Cork County Board. As a sister club of Glenbower Rovers, Killeagh is solely concerned with the game of hurling.

== History ==
Hurling and Gaelic football were played in the parish of Killeagh before the foundation of the Gaelic Athletic Association in 1884. No club existed in Killeagh itself at the time, resulting in locals playing hurling with the nearby Dungourney club. A GAA club in Killeagh affiliated to the East Cork Board when it was established in 1924.

A camogie club was formed in 1973. The club quickly became one of the most dominant and won five Cork SCC titles from 10 final appearances between 1978 and 1991. These five titles were subsequently converted into five Munster Club SCC titles. Killeagh beat Buffers Alley by 4–02 to 1–07 to win the All-Ireland Club SCC title in November 1980.

Killeagh GAA Club has operated in the junior ranks for the majority of its existence. The club won five East Cork JHC titles between 1967 and 1995. The fifth of these divisional titles was later converted into a Cork JAHC title, following Killeagh's 3–09 to 2–08 defeat of Ballinhassig in the final. Killeagh secured senior status for the first time in their history in 2001, when the club claimed the Cork IHC title after a 3–09 to 2–08 defeat of Mallow.

== Honours ==
=== Hurling ===
- Cork Intermediate Hurling Championship (1): 2001 (runners-Up 1998)
- Cork Junior A Hurling Championship (1): 1995
- East Cork Junior A Hurling Championship (5): 1967, 1970, 1971, 1988, 1995
- Cork Under-21 B Hurling Championship (1): 2014 (with St Ita's)
- Cork Premier 2 Minor Hurling Championship (2): 2022, 2023
- Cork Minor A Hurling Championship (1): 2006 (with St. Ita's)
- Cork Minor B Hurling Championship (1): 1987
- Cork Minor B Football Championship (2): 1989, 2001
- Féile na nGael Division 6 (1): 2019 (with St Ita's)

=== Camogie ===
- All-Ireland Senior Club Camogie Championship (1): 1980
- Munster Senior Club Camogie Championship (5): 1980, 1981, 1982, 1984, 1988
- Cork Senior Camogie Championship (5): 1980, 1981, 1982, 1984, 1988

== Notable players ==
- Joe Deane: All-Ireland SHC-winner (1999, 2004, 2005)
- Mark Landers: All-Ireland SHC-winning captain (1999)
- Mary O'Connor: All-Ireland SCC-winner (1997, 1998, 2002, 2005, 2006, 2008, 2009)

== In popular culture ==
Limerick-based folk band Kingfishr released a song about the hurling club, titled "Killeagh" in 2024.
