= Killeagh =

Village in County Cork, Ireland

Killeagh Cill Ia
- Village
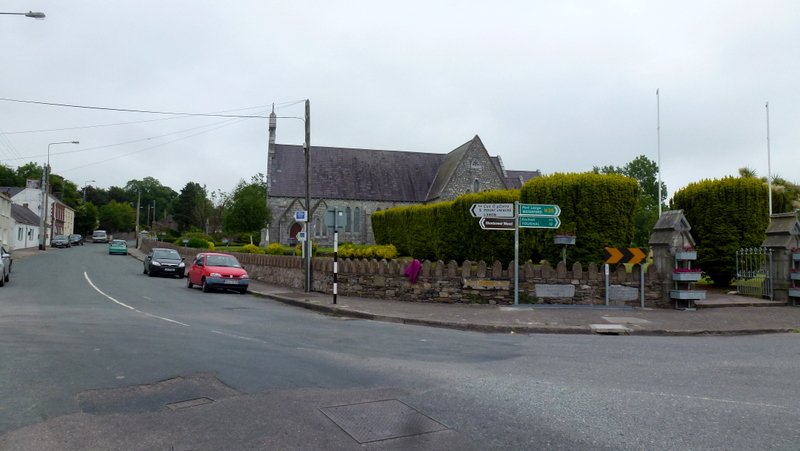
- St. John the Baptist Church

- Location within Ireland
- Coordinates: 51.942°N 7.992°W
- Country: Ireland
- Province: Munster
- County: Cork

Population (2022)
  - Total: 895

Killeagh (Irish: Cill Ia) is a village in east County Cork, Ireland. It is approximately 32 kilometres (20 mi) from Cork city, between Midleton and Youghal on the N25 national primary road. The village is in a civil parish of the same name.

== History ==
The name Killeagh derives from the Irish Cill Ia, which may refer to a "grey church" or the "church of Aedh" (Abban). According to some sources, a Saint Abban founded a nunnery at Killeagh in the 7th century, near the site of the current Church of Ireland (Anglican) church. Other evidence of ancient settlement in the area includes a number of castle, burnt mound, holy well and bullaun stone sites in the neighbouring townlands of Lagile and Aghadoe.

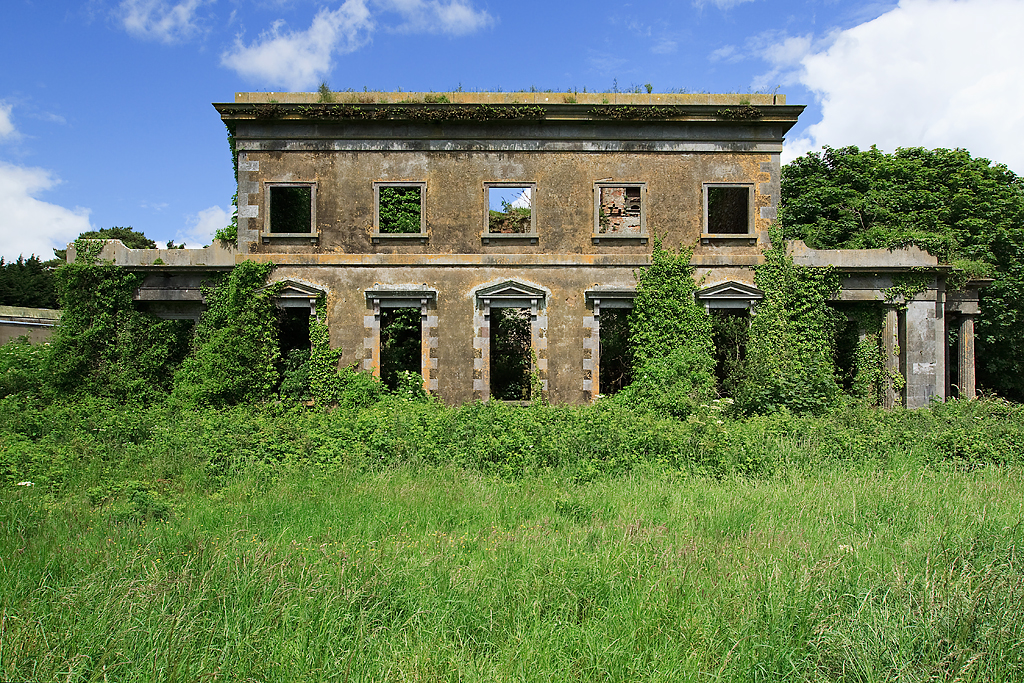
The ruins of Dromdihy House, built in the 1830s, lie in Dromdihy townland to the north of Killeagh village

Several buildings in the area are included in the Record of Protected Structures maintained by Cork County Council. These include Killeagh mills, Saint John & Saint Virgilius Catholic church, Killeagh's Church of Ireland church and Dromdiah House. The latter, which is located to the north of the village, was built in the 1830s by members of the Davis family and is now in ruin.

== Amenities ==
Amenities in Killeagh include a primary school, church, convenience stores, post office, pharmacy, Garda station, veterinary clinic and public houses. It is served by daily bus services between Waterford, Youghal and Cork City.

Leisure amenities in the area include the Killeagh GAA grounds and Glenbower Wood. Glenbower Wood is situated along part of the Dissour River valley to the north of the village.

The May Sunday Festival is a tradition in the village since the 1830s, when the De Capel Brooke family opened their estate (now Glenbower Wood) to the villagers to show off their improvements to the house and grounds.

Since 2017, Killeagh has been home to Greywood Arts, an artist's residency and events centre.

== Sport ==
The local Gaelic Athletic Association (GAA) club, Killeagh GAA, won the Cork Intermediate Hurling Championship in 2001. The song "Killeagh" by Kingfishr, which reached number 1 in the Irish Singles Chart in mid-2025, refers to the GAA club.

== Demographics ==
The population of Killeagh increased significantly between the 2002 census and 2016 census. The 2002 census recorded a population of 426, increasing to 521 (a 22.3% increase) by the 2006 census. By the 2016 census, the population had grown to 899. As of 2022, the population had dropped slightly to 895. Of these, 78% were white Irish, 10% were other white ethnicities, 1% black of black Irish, 2% were Asian, 1% were other ethnicities and 8% did not indicate an ethnicity. As of the 2022 census, 71% of Killeagh respondents indicated that they were Catholic, 7% were other stated religions, 13% had no religion, and over 8% did not indicate any religion.

== Notable people ==
- Mark Landers, All-Ireland winning captain of Cork in 1999.
- Joe Deane, winner of three All-Ireland hurling medals with Cork.
- Fearghal Curtin, current Irish National record holder for the marathon.
