= John Paul King =

Irish hurler

Personal information
- Native name: Seán Pól Ó Cionga (Irish)
- Born: 1982 (age 43–44) Newtownshandrum, County Cork, Ireland
- Occupation: Electrician
- Height: 5 ft 9 in (175 cm)

Sport
- Sport: Hurling
- Position: Left corner-forward
Club
Years	Club	Apps (scores)
1999-2016	Newtownshandrum	75 (11-79)
Club titles
- Cork titles: 4
- Munster titles: 3
- All-Ireland Titles: 1
Inter-county*
Years	County	Apps (scores)
2004	Cork	1 (0-00)
Inter-county titles
- Munster titles: 0
- All-Irelands: 1
- NHL: 0
- All Stars: 0
- *Inter County team apps and scores correct as of 22:27, 28 November 2019.

John Paul King (born 1982) is an Irish hurler who played for Cork Senior Championship club Newtownshandrum. He was a member of the Cork senior hurling team for one season, during which time he usually lined out as a left corner-forward.

== Playing career ==
=== Newtownshandrum ===
==== Minor and under-21 ====
King joined the Newtownshandrum club at a young age and played in all grades at juvenile and underage levels. On 19 October 1997, he was just 15-years-old when he lined out at left corner-forward when Newtownshandrum faced St. Finbarr's in the Premier County Minor Championship final. King was held scoreless in Newtown's 2–13 to 0–10 defeat.

King subsequently progressed onto the Newtownshandrum under-21 team. On 29 November 1998, he was at left corner-forward when Newtownshandrum faced Na Piarsaigh in the Cork Under-21 Championship final. King top scored with 1-02 from play in the 1–11 to 0–14 draw. The replay took place on 6 December 1998, with King switching to right corner-forward and scoring four points from play in the 1–12 to 0–07 victory and a first title for Newtown in 25 years.

On 12 December 1999, King was at left wing-forward when Newtownshandrum lined out against Erin's Own in a second successive Cork Under-21 Championship final. He scored two points from play and collected a second successive winners' medal after the 1–13 to 1–07 victory.

O'Connor lined out in a third successive under-21 final with Newtownshandrum on 17 December 2000 when the club faced Glen Rovers. He scored 0-04 from midfield in the 1–17 to 1–07 victory and collected a third successive winners' medal.

==== Senior ====
On 8 October 2000, King was selected at right wing-forward when Newtownshandrum faced Erin's Own in the Cork Senior Championship final. He was held scoreless throughout the game but claimed a winners' medal following the 0–14 to 0–11 victory and a first-ever championship title for Newtown.

On 15 September 2002, King was at left corner-forward when Newtownshandrum faced reigning champions Blackrock in the Cork Senior Championship final. He was again held scoreless throughout the 1–14 to 0–12 defeat.

Newtownshandrum faced Blackrock in a second successive Cork Senior Championship final on 12 October 2003 with King lining out at centre-forward. He scored two points from right corner-forward in the 0–17 to 1–09 victory. On 30 November, King won a Munster Club Championship medal after scoring four points from right wing-forward in the 2–18 to 2–09 defeat of Patrickswell in the final. King was at left wing-forward when Newtownshandrum defeated Dunloy by 0–17 to 1–06 in the All-Ireland final on 17 March 2004.

On 16 October 2005, King won a third Cork Senior Championship medal when he scored two points from full-forward in a 0–15 to 0–09 defeat of Cloyne in the final. He again scored two points from play when Newtownshandrum defeated Ballygunner to win a second Munster Club Championship title on 4 December 2005. King was switched to midfield for the All-Ireland final on 17 March 2006 but was held scoreless in the 2–08 to 1–06 defeat by Portumna.

King lined out at full-forward in a fifth Cork Senior Championship final on 14 October 2007. He was held scoreless throughout the game and ended on the losing side after a 1–11 to 1–07 defeat by reigning champions Erin's Own.

On 11 October 2009, King was selected on the substitutes' bench when Newtownshandrum faced Sarsfields in the Cork Senior Championship final. He was introduced as a 38th-minute substitute and claimed a fourth winners' medal after scoring a point in the 3–22 to 1–12 defeat. On 29 November 2009, King was again introduced as a substitute when Newtownshandrum won their third Munster Club Championship after a 2–11 to 2–09 defeat of Ballygunner.

=== Cork ===
==== Senior ====
King was added to the Cork senior hurling team following Newtownshandrum's All-Ireland Club Championship success in 2004. On 27 June 2004, he was an unused substitute when Cork suffered a 3–16 to 1–21 defeat by Waterford in the Munster final. On 15 August 2004, King made his championship debut when he came on as a 61st-minute substitute for Joe Deane at right corner-forward in a 1–27 to 0–12 defeat of Wexford in the All-Ireland semi-final. On 12 September 2004, he was an unused substitute when Cork defeated Kilkenny by 0–17 to 0–09 in the All-Ireland final

== Career statistics ==
=== Club ===
Team	Season	Cork		Munster		All-Ireland		Total	
Team	Season	Apps	Score	Apps	Score	Apps	Score	Apps	Score
Newtownshandrum	1999	2	0-01	—		—		2	0-01
Newtownshandrum	2000	5	1-06	0	0-00	—		5	1-06
Newtownshandrum	2001	5	1-06	—		—		5	1-06
Newtownshandrum	2002	5	3-06	—		—		5	3-06
Newtownshandrum	2003	5	1-03	2	0-05	3	0-03	10	1-11
Newtownshandrum	2004	5	2-04	—		—		5	2-04
Newtownshandrum	2005	4	1-06	2	0-04	2	0-00	8	1-10
Newtownshandrum	2006	4	0-08	—		—		4	0-08
Newtownshandrum	2007	5	0-03	—		—		5	0-03
Newtownshandrum	2008	3	0-03	—		—		3	0-03
Newtownshandrum	2009	2	0-02	3	0-00	0	0-00	5	0-02
Newtownshandrum	2010	0	0-00	—		—		0	0-00
Newtownshandrum	2011	3	0-04	—		—		3	0-04
Newtownshandrum	2012	3	0-00	—		—		3	0-00
Newtownshandrum	2013	2	1-05	—		—		2	1-05
Newtownshandrum	2014	3	0-01	—		—		3	0-01
Newtownshandrum	2015	3	1-07	—		—		3	1-07
Newtownshandrum	2016	4	0-02	—		—		4	0-02
Total		63	11-67	7	0-09	5	0-03	75	11-79

=== Inter-county ===
Team	Year	National League			Munster		All-Ireland		Total	
Team	Year	Division	Apps	Score	Apps	Score	Apps	Score	Apps	Score
Cork	2004	Division 1B	—		0	0-00	1	0-00	1	0-00
Total			—		0	0-00	1	0-00	1	0-00

== Honours ==
Newtownshandrum

- All-Ireland Senior Club Hurling Championship (1): 2004
- Munster Senior Club Hurling Championship (3): 2003, 2005, 2009
- Cork Senior Hurling Championship (4): 2000, 2003, 2005, 2009
- Cork Under-21 Hurling Championship (3): 1998, 1999, 2000

Cork

- All-Ireland Senior Hurling Championship (1): 2004
