= Paul Morrissey (hurler) =

Irish hurler

Personal information
- Native name: Pól Ó Muireasa (Irish)
- Nickname: The Savior
- Born: 1980 (age 45–46) Newtownshandrum, County Cork, Ireland
- Occupation: Fitter
- Height: 5 ft 11 in (180 cm)

Sport
- Sport: Hurling
- Position: Goalkeeper
Club
- Years: Club
- Newtownshandrum
Club titles
- Cork titles: 4
- Munster titles: 2
- All-Ireland Titles: 1
Inter-county*
Years	County	Apps (scores)
2003-2005	Cork	0 (0-00)
Inter-county titles
- Munster titles: 2
- All-Irelands: 2
- NHL: 0
- All Stars: 0
- *Inter County team apps and scores correct as of 20:14, 29 January 2019.

Paul Morrissey (born 1980) is an Irish retired hurler who played for Cork Senior Championship club Newtownshandrum. He usually lined out as a goalkeeper. Morrissey is also a former member of the Cork senior hurling team.

== Career statistics ==
=== Inter-county ===
Team	Year	National League			Munster		All-Ireland		Total	
Team	Year	Division	Apps	Score	Apps	Score	Apps	Score	Apps	Score
Cork	2003	Division 1B	2	0-00	0	0-00	0	0-00	2	0-00
Cork	2004	Division 1B	1	0-00	0	0-00	0	0-00	1	0-00
Cork	2005	Division 1B	1	0-00	0	0-00	0	0-00	1	0-00
Career total			4	0-00	0	0-00	0	0-00	4	0-00

== Honours ==
Newtownshandrum

- All-Ireland Senior Club Hurling Championship (1): 2004
- Munster Senior Club Hurling Championship (3): 2003, 2005, 2009
- Cork Senior Hurling Championship (4): 2000, 2003, 2005, 2009
- Cork Under-21 Hurling Championship (3): 1998, 1999, 2000

Cork

- All-Ireland Senior Hurling Championship (2): 2004, 2005
- Munster Senior Hurling Championship (2): 2003, 2005
