= James Bowles =

Irish hurler

Personal information
- Native name: Séamus Ó Baoill (Irish)
- Born: 1985 (age 40–41) Newtownshandrum, County Cork, Ireland
- Occupation: Recruitment manager
- Height: 6 ft 1 in (185 cm)

Sport
- Sport: Hurling
- Position: Left corner-forward
Club*
Years	Club	Apps (scores)
2001-present	Newtownshandrum	96 (20-46)
Club titles
- Cork titles: 3
- Munster titles: 3
- All-Ireland Titles: 1
College
- Years: College
- Cork Institute of Technology
College titles
- Fitzgibbon titles: 0
Inter-county
Years	County	Apps (scores)
2004-2005	Cork	0 (0-0)
Inter-county titles
- Munster titles: 0
- All-Irelands: 1
- NHL: 0
- All Stars: 0
- * club appearances and scores correct as of 17:13, 12 AUgust 2025.

James Bowles (born 1985) is an Irish hurler. At club level, he plays with Newtownshandrum and at inter-county level is a former member of the Cork senior hurling team.

== Career ==
Bowles played various grades of hurling during his time as a student at CBS Charleville, including being part of the school's Harty Cup team. He later studied at Cork Institute of Technology and was included on their Fitzgibbon Cup panel.

At club level, Bowles first played for Newtownshandrum at juvenile and underage levels, before joining the club's senior team in 2001. He won his first Cork SHC medal following a defeat of Blackrock in the 2003 final. Bowles later claimed a Munster Club SHC medal, before lining out at corner-forward when Newtown beat Dunloy by 0–17 to 1–06 in the 2004 All-Ireland Club SHC final. He won further Cork SHC and Munster Club SHC medals in 2005 and 2009.

Bowles first appeared on the inter-county scene for Cork during a two-year tenure with the minor team. He later spent three seasons with the under-21 team and won a Munster U21HC medal in his second season with the team. Bowles was a late addition to the senior team for their defeat of Kilkenny in the 2004 All-Ireland final.

== Career statistics ==
=== Club ===
Team	Season	Cork		Munster		All-Ireland		Total	
Team	Season	Apps	Score	Apps	Score	Apps	Score	Apps	Score
Newtownshandrum	2001	0	0-00	—		—		0	0-00
Newtownshandrum	2002	5	1-03	—		—		5	1-03
Newtownshandrum	2003	5	1-09	2	2-03	4	1-03	11	4-15
Newtownshandrum	2004	5	2-02	—		—		5	2-02
Newtownshandrum	2005	4	2-01	2	0-02	2	0-00	8	2-03
Newtownshandrum	2006	4	2-03	—		—		4	2-03
Newtownshandrum	2007	4	0-04	—		—		4	0-04
Newtownshandrum	2008	3	1-00	—		—		3	1-00
Newtownshandrum	2009	5	4-05	2	2-00	1	0-00	8	6-05
Newtownshandrum	2010	5	2-02	—		—		5	2-02
Newtownshandrum	2011	3	0-01	—		—		3	0-01
Newtownshandrum	2012	0	0-00	—		—		0	0-00
Newtownshandrum	2013	2	0-01	—		—		2	0-01
Newtownshandrum	2014	2	0-04	—		—		2	0-04
Newtownshandrum	2015	3	0-02	—		—		3	0-02
Newtownshandrum	2016	4	0-00	—		—		4	0-00
Newtownshandrum	2017	3	0-01	—		—		3	0-01
Newtownshandrum	2018	3	0-00	—		—		3	0-00
Newtownshandrum	2019	4	0-00	—		—		4	0-00
Newtownshandrum	2020	3	0-00	—		—		3	0-00
Newtownshandrum	2021	3	0-00	—		—		3	0-00
Newtownshandrum	2022	5	0-00	—		—		5	0-00
Newtownshandrum	2023	3	0-00	—		—		3	0-00
Newtownshandrum	2024	4	0-00	—		—		4	0-00
Newtownshandrum	2025	4	0-00	—		—		4	0-00
Career total		86	15-38	6	4-05	7	1-03	99	20-46

=== Inter-county ===
Team	Year	National League			Munster		All-Ireland		Totat	
Team	Year	Division	Apps	Score	Apps	Score	Apps	Score	Apps	Score
Cork	2004	Division 1B	—		—		0	0-00	0	0-00
Cork	2005	Division 1B	2	0-01	—		—		2	0-00
Career total			2	0-01	—		0	0-00	2	0-01

== Career honours ==
Newtownshandrum

- All-Ireland Senior Club Hurling Championship: 2004
- Munster Senior Club Hurling Championship: 2003, 2005, 2009
- Cork Senior Hurling Championship: 2003, 2005, 2009

Cork

- All-Ireland Senior Hurling Championship: 2004
- Munster Under-21 Hurling Championship: 2005
