= Adrian Coughlan =

Irish hurler

Personal information
- Native name: Aodrán Ó Cochlainn (Irish)
- Born: 15 May 1978 (age 48) Blackrock, Cork, Ireland
- Occupation: EMEA Senior Financial Analyst

Sport
- Sport: Hurling
- Position: Right wing-forward
Club
- Years: Club
- Blackrock
Club titles
- Cork titles: 3
College
- Years: College
- 1996-1999: University College Cork
Inter-county*
Years	County	Apps (scores)
2003-2004	Cork	0 (0-00)
Inter-county titles
- Munster titles: 1
- All-Irelands: 0
- NHL: 0
- All Stars: 0
- *Inter County team apps and scores correct as of 00:09, 6 August 2014.

Adrian Coughlan (born 15 May 1978) is an Irish hurler who played as a right wing-forward for the Cork senior team.

Born in Blackrock, Coughlan first played competitive hurling whilst at school at the North Monastery. He arrived on the inter-county scene at the age of seventeen when he first linked up with the Cork minor team. He joined the senior panel during the 2003 championship. Coughlan went on to win one Munster medal as a non-playing substitute. He was an All-Ireland runner-up on one occasion also as a non-playing substitute.

At club level he is a three-time championship medallist with Blackrock.

Coughlan left the Cork panel after the 2004 National Hurling League.

== Playing career ==
=== College ===
In 1994 Coughlan was a key member of the half-forward line as the North Monastery faced Midleton CBS Secondary School in the Munster colleges decider. The Mon powered to a 1-9 to 0-4 victory and the Harty Cup title. St. Mary's College provided the opposition in the subsequent All-Ireland final, however, a 1-10 to 1-6 victory for the North Mon gave Coughlan an All-Ireland medal.

=== Club ===
In 1999 Coughlan lined out against University College Cork in his first senior championship decider. A 3-17 to 0-8 trouncing gave him his first championship medal.

Blackrock surrendered their crown the following year, however, Coughlan was back in the decider again in 2001. Imokilly were the opponents, however, a remarkable scoring spree by Alan Browne, who captured 3-8, helped the Rockies to a 4-8 to 2-7 victory. It was Coughlan's second championship medal.

In 2002 Blackrock had the chance to retain their title when they faced Newtownshandrum in the decider. The Rockies looked more probable winners from the time Alan Browne goaled just before half time, however, some bad finishing left them unnecessarily vulnerable. The goal proved key as Blackrock claimed a 1-14 to 0-12 victory and Coughlan collected a third championship medal.

=== Inter-county ===
Coughlan first played for Cork as a member of the minor team in 1995. He won a Munster medal that year following a 3-18 to 0-10 trouncing of Waterford. Cork later qualified for the All-Ireland final against Kilkenny with Coughlan starting the game as a substitute. The game turned into a rout as Cork won easily by 2-10 to 1-2, giving Coughlan, who came on, an All-Ireland Minor Hurling Championship medal.

In 2003 Coughlan was added to Cork's championship panel. He was an unused substitute throughout the entire campaign, as Cork claimed the Munster title before losing to Kilkenny by 1-14 to 1-11 in the All-Ireland decider. Deane later added a third All-Star to his collection.

Coughlan left the Cork panel after the conclusion of the National Hurling League in 2004.

== Honours ==
=== Team ===
North Monastery

- All-Ireland Senior Colleges Hurling Championship (1): 1994
- Munster Senior Colleges Hurling Championship (1): 1994

Blackrock

- Cork Senior Hurling Championship (3): 1999, 2001, 2002

Cork

- Munster Senior Hurling Championship (1): 2003 (sub)
- All-Ireland Minor Hurling Championship (1): 1995
- Munster Minor Hurling Championship (1): 1995

== Career statistics ==
=== Club ===
Team	Season	Cork		Munster		All-Ireland		Total	
Team	Season	Apps	Score	Apps	Score	Apps	Score	Apps	Score
Blackrock	1997-98	x	0-04	—		—		x	0-04
Blackrock	1998-99	4	0-15	2	0-07	—		6	0-22
Blackrock	1999-00	5	1-12	1	0-03	—		6	1-15
Blackrock	2000-01	x	0-01	—		—		x	0-01
Blackrock	2001-02	5	0-12	x	0-02	—		x	0-14
Blackrock	2002-03	5	1-19	2	0-09	—		7	1-28
Blackrock	2003-04	5	2-25	—		—		5	2-25
Blackrock	2004-05	6	0-27	—		—		6	0-27
Blackrock	2005-06	4	0-15	—		—		4	0-15
Blackrock	2006-07	3	0-21	—		—		3	0-21
Blackrock	2007-08	3	0-14	—		—		3	0-14
