= 1996 Cork Intermediate Hurling Championship =

Irish hurling competition

- Dates: 15 June 1996 – 3 November 1996
- Teams: 24
- Champions: Newtownshandrum (4th title); John McCarthy (captain); Christy Morrissey (manager)
- Runners-up: Cloyne; Declan Motherway (captain); Jerry O'Sullivan (manager)

Tournament statistics
- Matches played: 28
- Goals scored: 78 (2.79 per match)
- Points scored: 623 (22.25 per match)
- Top scorer(s): Ben O'Connor (3-33)

The 1996 Cork Intermediate Hurling Championship was the 87th staging of the Cork Intermediate Hurling Championship since its establishment by the Cork County Board in 1909. The draw for the opening fixtures took place on 10 December 1995. The championship began on 15 June 1996 and ended on 3 November 1996.

On 3 November 1996, Newtownshandrum won the championship after a 0-12 to 0-09 defeat of Cloyne in a final replay at Páirc Uí Chaoimh. It was their fourth championship title overall and their first title since 1981.

Newtownshandrum's Ben O'Connor was the championship's top scorer with 3-33.

== Team changes ==
=== From Championship ===
Promoted to the Cork Senior Hurling Championship

- Kilbrittain

Regraded to the East Cork Junior A Hurling Championship

- Midleton

Regraded to the City Junior A Hurling Championship

- Blackrock

=== To Championship ===
Promoted from the Cork Junior Hurling Championship

- Killeagh

== Results ==
=== First round ===
15 June 1996 First round	Newtownshandrum	3-10 - 0-07	Ballincollig	Kanturk
	B O'Connor 1-4, J Ryan 1-1, J O'Connor 1-0, D Mulcahy 0-3, M Morrissey 0-1, C Morrissey 0-1.		D Murphy 0-4, A Beale 0-1, B Gleeson 0-1, K O'Donoghue 0-1.	Referee: R Murphy

21 June 1996 First round	Delanys	3-20 - 5-08	Killeagh	Páirc Uí Chonaill, Cobh
	B Egan 1-9, M McElhinney 1-5, D Power 1-1, K Egan 0-3, P Finnegan 0-1, G Healy 0-1.		J Deane 2-2, B Walsh 1-2, T Fitzgibbon 1-1, R Walsh 1-0, M Landers 0-1, G Scully 0-1, M Treacy 0-1.	Referee: P O'Neill (Shamrocks)

22 June 1996 First round	Inniscarra	1-12 - 1-11	Aghabullogue	Cloughduv
	S Holland 0-9, J O'Herlihy 1-0, T Ahern 0-1, M O'Regan 0-1, J O'Mahony 0-1.		J Healy 0-7, T Ó Murchú 1-0, J Foley 0-2, D O'Leary 0-1, D Ring 0-1.

22 June 1996 First round	Tracton	3-14 - 0-09	Carrigtwohill	Páirc Uí Chaoimh, Cork
	F Walsh 1-4, M Quinn 1-3, P Murphy 1-1, W Flynn 0-3, J Kingston 0-1, L Kelly 0-1, M Kingston 0-1.		E O'Mahony 0-3, M Barry 0-2, T O'Brien 0-1, S Collins 0-1, C Lehane 0-1, S Barry 0-1.	Referee: J O'Leray (Na Piarsaigh)

23 June 1996 First round	Newcestown	2-08 - 2-09	Ballymartle	Ballinhassig
	P Kenneally 1-1, D Long 0-2, P Crowley 0-2, P Condon 0-1, J O'Sullivan 0-1, C Crowley 0-1.		P Deasy 1-4, G Cummins 1-2, P Coughlan 0-2, A McCarthy 0-1.

30 June 1996 First round	Aghada	0-17 - 0-16	Cobh	Páirc Séamus de Barra, Carrigtwohill
	M Lewis 0-5, R Lewis 0-4, R Dwane 0-3, Peter Cashman 0-2, K O'Keeffe 0-1, Pat Cashman 0-1.		D Morgan 0-4, P Looney 0-4, R Meaney 0-3, B Meaney 0-2, D Barrett 0-2, V O'Rourke 0-1.	Referee: P Hogan (Carrigtwohill)

6 July 1996 First round	St. Finbarr's	0-10 - 0-10	Valley Rovers	Ovens
	F O'Brien 0-5, E Fitzpatrick 0-2, S McCarthy 0-1, I O'Mahony 0-1, F Ramsey 0-1.		E Newman 0-4, J Hurley 0-2, L Burke 0-1, D Kiely 0-1, C O'Donovan 0-1, K McCarthy 0-1.	Referee: J Kearney (Na Piarsaigh)

13 July 1996 First round	Cloughduv	5-16 - 1-06	Bishopstown	Ballinora
	T Gentleman 3-3, T Barry-Murphy 0-9, F Walsh 1-1, K Murray 1-0, J Barry-Murphy 0-1, J Clifford 0-1, J O'Riordan 0-1.		K Harrington 1-3, T O'Leary 0-1, B O'Shea 0-1, K O'Callaghan 0-1.	Referee: W Horgan (Brian Dillons)

28 July 1996 First round replay	St. Finbarr's	3-11 - 1-10	Valley Rovers	Ovens
	F O'Brien 1-3, I O'Mahony 1-0, P Forde 1-0, E Fitzpatrick 0-3, J McCarthy 0-2, S McCarthy 0-2, F Ramsey 0-1.		D Kiely 0-5, C O'Donovan 1-0, M Kelleher 0-2, E Newman 0-2, F Twohig 0-1.

=== Second round ===
15 June 1996 Second round	Cloyne	3-09 - 1-09	Glen Rovers	Caherlag Sportsfield, Glounthaune
	P Cahill 1-1, B Motherway 1-1, E Canavan 0-4, E o'Sullivan 1-0, D Motherway 0-2, M O'Driscoll 0-1.		C Walsh 1-1, G Hackett 0-4, G Foley 0-1, C Buckley 0-1, T Harte 0-1, S McGrath 0-1.	Referee: D Relihan

30 June 1996 Second round	St. Vincent's	0-13 - 1-10	Douglas	Páirc Uí Chaoimh, Cork
	W Leahy 0-5, K Goulding 0-3, A McCarthy 0-2, G O'Connor 0-1, T O'Sullivan 0-1, J Gould 0-1.		T Twomey 1-3, P Barry 0-2, T O'Donovan 0-1, M Barry 0-1, D Larkin 0-1, J Farrell 0-1, J Lynch 0-1.

12 July 1996 Second round	Éire Óg	0-09 - 0-07	Na Piarsaigh	Inniscarra
	P O'Flynn 0-3, K Sheehan 0-2, C Óg Sheehan 0-2, N Brennan 0-1, P Coakley 0-1.		P Kelleher 0-3, M O'Sullivan 0-2, C O'Sullivan 0-1, S O'Connell 0-1.

13 July 1996 Second round	Aghada	2-13 - 1-14	Ballymartle	Riverstown
	R Lewis 1-3, C Counihan 1-0, G Sheehan 0-2, D Devoy 0-2, R Dwane 0-2, M Lewis 0-2, P Sisk 0-1, D Lee 0-1.		K Lordan 1-2, P Deasy 0-5, J O'Mahony 0-2, C Deasy 0-1, C Sheehan 0-1, A McCarthy 0-1, F Murphy 0-1, P Coughlan 0-1.

13 July 1996 Second round replay	St. Vincent's	1-10 - 3-17	Douglas	Páirc Uí Rinn, Cork
	W Leahy 0-4, J Gould 1-0, D Murphy 0-3, C Hartnett 0-1, A McCarthy 0-1, T O'Sullivan 0-1.		T Twomey 1-5, T Flynn 2-1, T O'Donovan 0-4, D Larkin 0-3, P Barry 0-2, J Farrell 0-1, J Lynch 0-1.

19 July 1996 Second round	Newtownshandrum	0-15 - 1-08	Delanys	Mallow
	B O'Connor 0-9, J O'Connor 0-1, J Coughlan 0-1, C Morrissey 0-1, J Ryan 0-1.		B Egan 0-5, D Power 1-0, D Quinlan 0-1, M McElhinney 0-1.

20 July 1996 Second round	Blarney	1-09 - 0-12	Mallow	Inniscarra
	E McCarthy 1-0, A Murphy 0-3, B Sheehan 0-3, F Coleman 0-1, G Nagle 0-1, S O'Donoghue 0-1.		R O'Connell 0-3, S Buckley 0-2, F McCormack 0-2, M Buckley 0-1, R Sheehan 0-1, T O'Riordan 0-1, M O'Mahony 0-1, J Walsh 0-1.	Referee: J Keaney (Na Piarsaigh)

28 July 1996 Second round	Cloughduv	0-15 - 1-06	Inniscarra	Ovens
	J CLifford 0-4, K Murray 0-4, F Walsh 0-3, T Barry-Murphy 0-3, J O'Riordan 0-1.		M O'Regan 1-0, S Holland 0-2, D Holland 0-2, T Aherne 0-1, C McDonnell 0-1.	Referee: L Flynn (Éire Óg)

4 August 1996 Second round replay	Blarney	1-14 - 0-15	Mallow	Inniscarra
	A Murphy 1-4, J Goggin 0-4, G Nagle 0-2, R O'Sullivan 0-1, J Downey 0-1, B Sheehan 0-1, E McCarthy 0-1.		A Aherne 0-5, R O'Connell 0-4, B Sheehan 0-3, J Hayes 0-2, T O'Riordan 0-1.	Referee: J Kearney (Na Piarsaigh)

10 August 1996 Second round	Tracton	2-11 - 3-08	St. Finbarr's	Carrigaline
	P Murphy 1-1, P Murphy 0-4, M Quinn 1-0, F Walsh 0-2, L Kelly 0-2, J Kingston 0-1, M Kingston 0-1.		F Ramsey 1-2, F O'Brien 1-1, M Desmond 1-0, E Fitzpatrick 0-3, J McCarthy 0-1, S McCarthy 0-1.	Referee: W Horgan (Brian Dillons)

25 August 1996 Second round replay	Tracton	3-13 - 3-20 (aet)	St. Finbarr's	Carrigaline
	K Kingston 1-4, M Quinn 1-1, P Murphy 1-1, F Walsh 0-4, M Kingston 0-1, J Kinsgton 0-1, L Kelly 0-1.		F O'Brien 0-11, P Forde 2-0, I O'Mahony 0-5, J McCarthy 1-1, B O'Connell 0-1, S McCarthy 0-1, F Ramsey 0-1.	Referee: W Horgan (Brian Dillons)

=== Quarter-finals ===
28 July 1996 Quarter-final	Cloyne	2-09 - 1-09	Douglas	Páirc Séamus de Barra, Carrigtwohill
	T Flynn 1-1, M O'Driscoll 1-1, E Canavan 0-4, P Cahill 0-2, B Motherway 0-1.		J Farrell 0-6, T Twomey 1-1, D Larkin 0-1, C Toal 0-1.	Referee: K Healy (Ballymartle)

10 August 1996 Quarter-final	Éire Óg	1-15 - 0-12	Blarney	Coachford
	P Coakley 1-6, M Sheehan 0-3, C Óg Sheehan 0-2, P Bradley 0-1, K Madden 0-1, J Murphy 0-1, P O'Flynn 0-1.		A Murphy 0-5, J Hurley 0-2, J Goggin 0-2, R O'Sullivan 0-1, G Nagle 0-1, T Harrington 0-1.	Referee: G Harrington (Carrigaline)

17 August 1996 Quarter-final	Newtownshandrum	3-07 - 2-05	Cloughduv	Banteer Sportsfield, Banteer
	B O'Connor 2-3, D O'Riordan 1-1, C Morrissey 0-1, J O'Connor 0-1, D Mulcahy 0-1, R TRoy 0-1.		F Walsh 1-0, T O'Mahony 1-0, T Barry-Murphy 0-3, K Murray 0-2.	Referee: W Horgan (Brian Dillons)

8 September 1996 Quarter-final	Aghada	1-17 - 2-12	St. Finbarr's	Caherlag Sportsfield, Glounthaune
	R Lewis 0-8, C Counihan 1-1, D Lee 0-3, D Devoy 0-1, P Cashman 0-1, M Lewis 0-1, D Godfrey 0-1, R Dwane 0-1.		M Desmond 1-1, J O'Connor 1-0, I O'Mahony 0-2, F O'Brien 0-2, J Griffin 0-2, P Forde 0-1, F Ramsey 0-1, D Hurley 0-1, J McCarthy 0-1.	Referee: D O'Leary (Cloughduv)

=== Semi-finals ===
8 September 1996 Semi-final	Cloyne	3-06 - 1-10	Éire Óg	Páirc Uí Rinn, Cork
	P Cahill 1-1, I Quinlan 1-1, B Motherway 1-0, M O'Driscoll 0-2, M Cahill 0-1, E Canavan 0-1.		P Bradley 1-2, M Sheehan 0-4, C Óg Sheehan 0-1, J Murphy 0-1, P Coakley 0-1, P Flynn 0-1.	Referee: W Horgan (Brian Dillons)

28 September 1996 Semi-final	Newtownshandrum	1-13 - 1-09	Aghada	Páirc Mac Gearailt, Fermoy
	J O'Connor 1-4, B O'Connor 0-7, D Mulcahy 0-1, D O'Riordan 0-1.		R Lewis 1-3, R Dwane 0-3, P Cashman 0-1, D Devoy 0-1, D Creedon 0-1.	Referee: D O'Leary (Cloughduv)

=== Finals ===
20 October 1996 Final	Newtownshandrum	2-07 - 1-10	Cloyne	Ballincollig Sportsfield, Ballincollig
	D O'Riordan 2-0, B O'Connor 0-4, R Troy 0-1, D Mulcahy 0-1, J Ryan 0-1.		E Canavan 0-6, E O'Sullivan 1-0, P Cahill 0-3, M O'Driscoll 0-1.	Referee: K Healy (Ballymartle)

3 November 1996 Final replay	Newtownshandrum	0-12 - 0-09	Cloyne	Páirc Uí Chaoimh, Cork
	B O'Connor 0-6, D Mulcahy 0-3, D O'Riordan 0-2, J O'Connor 0-1.		I Quinlan 0-3, E Canavan 0-3, P Cahill 0-2, B Motherway 0-1.	Referee: K Healy (Ballymartle)

== Championship statistics ==
=== Top scorers ===
Overall

Rank	Player	Club	Tally	Total	Matches	Average
1	Ben O'Connor	Newtownshandrum	3-33	42	6	7.00
2	Flor O'Brien	St. Finbarr's	2-22	28	5	6.60
3	Richie Lewis	Aghada	2-18	24	4	6.60
4	Tomás Twomey	Douglas	3-09	18	3	6.60
4	Éamonn Canavan	Cloyne	0-18	18	5	3.60
6	Barry Egan	Delaneys	1-14	17	2	8.50
7	Jerry O'Connor	Newtownshandrum	3-07	16	6	2.66
8	Philip Cahill	Cloyne	2-09	15	5	3.00
8	Anthony Murphy	Blarney	1-12	15	3	5.00
8	Tim Barry-Murphy	Cloughduv	0-15	15	3	5.00

In a single game

Rank	Player	Club	Tally	Total	Opposition
1	Tom Gentleman	Cloughduv	3-03	12	Bishopstown
1	Barry Egan	Delaneys	1-09	12	Killeagh
3	Flor O'Brien	St. Finbarr's	0-11	11	Tracton
4	Ben O'Connor	Newtownshandrum	2-03	9	Cloughduv
4	Paul Coakley	Éire Óg	1-06	9	Blarney
4	Ben O'Connor	Newtownshandrum	0-09	9	Delaneys
4	Seán Holland	Inniscarra	0-09	9	Aghabullogue
4	Tim Barry-Murphy	Cloughduv	0-09	9	Bishopstown
9	Joe Deane	Killeagh	2-02	8	Delaneys
9	Mark McElhinney	Delaneys	1-05	8	Killeagh
9	Tomás Twomey	Douglas	1-05	8	St. Vincent's
9	Richie Lewis	Aghada	0-08	8	St. Finbarr's
