= Ger Cunningham (Limerick hurler) =

Irish hurler

Ger Cunningham (born 1972) is an Irish retired hurler who played for the Limerick minor team.

Born in Knockainey, County Limerick, Cunningham first arrived on the inter-county scene at the age of seventeen when he first linked up with the Limerick minor team. At club level, Cunningham played with Knockainey Hurling Club.

In retirement from playing Cunningham became involved in team management and coaching. At club level he was an All-Ireland-winning coach with Newtownshandrum before steering Thurles Sarsfields to a first championship in over thirty years. Cunningham has served as a selector with the Limerick minor and senior teams, before becoming technical coach with the Laois senior team. On 28 May 2015 he was appointed interim manager of the Laois senior team.

== Honours ==
=== Coach ===
Newtownshandrum

- All-Ireland Senior Club Hurling Championship (1): 2004
- Munster Senior Club Hurling Championship (1): 2003
- Cork Senior Club Hurling Championship (1): 2003

Thurles Sarsfields

- Tipperary Senior Club Hurling Championship (1): 2005

University of Limerick

- Fitzgibbon Cup (1): 2011

Sporting positions
Preceded by Séamus Plunkett	Laois Senior Hurling Manager; 2015	Succeeded by Séamus Plunkett
