= Ben O'Connor (hurler) =

Irish hurling coach and former player

Personal information
- Native name: Beircheart Ó Conchubhair (Irish)
- Born: 25 January 1979 (age 47) Newtownshandrum, County Cork, Ireland
- Occupation: Hurley maker / Postman
- Height: 5 ft 10 in (178 cm)

Sport
- Sport: Hurling
- Position: Right wing-forward
Club
Years	Club	Apps (scores)
1996–2012	Newtownshandrum	79 (22-472)
Club titles
- Cork titles: 4
- Munster titles: 3
- All-Ireland Titles: 1
Inter-county*
Years	County	Apps (scores)
1999–2012	Cork	62 (8–230)
Inter-county titles
- Munster titles: 5
- All-Irelands: 3
- NHL: 0
- All Stars: 2
- *Inter County team apps and scores correct as of 22:52, 15 March 2012.

Ben O'Connor (born 25 January 1979) is an Irish hurling coach and former player. He is the current Cork Senior Hurling Manager. O'Connor played for Cork Senior Championship club Newtownshandrum and was a member of the Cork senior hurling team for 14 seasons, during which time he usually lined out as a right wing-forward. Noted for his commanding presence and scoring ability on the wing, he is regarded as one of the greatest players of his generation.

O'Connor began his hurling career at club level with Newtownshandrum. He broke onto the club's top adult team as a 17-year-old in 1996 and enjoyed his first success that year when the club won the Cork Intermediate Championship title and promotion to the top flight of Cork hurling. O'Connor went on to make 79 championship appearances at senior level and was at centre-forward on Newtownshandrum's All-Ireland Club Championship-winning team in 2004. His club career ended in 2012, by which time he had also won three Munster Club Championship titles and four Cork Senior Championship titles.

At inter-county level, O'Connor was part of the successful Cork under-21 team that won the All-Ireland Championship in 1998. He joined the Cork senior team in 1999. From his debut, O'Connor was ever-present as a forward and made a combined total of 114 National League and Championship appearances in a career that ended with his last game in 2012. During that time he was joined on the team by his twin brother Jerry and was part of three All-Ireland Championship-winning teams – in 1999, as captain of the team in 2004 and 2005. O'Connor also secured five Munster Championship medals. He announced his retirement from inter-county hurling on 15 March 2012.

O'Connor won his first All-Star in 2005, before claiming a further All-Star in 2008. He is currently Cork's fourth-highest championship scorer of all time, having scored 8–230 in 62 appearances. At inter-provincial level, O'Connor was selected to play in four championship campaigns with Munster, with his sole Railway Cup medal being won in 2005.

== Early life ==
Born and raised in the village of Newtownshandrum, County Cork, O'Connor first played hurling to a high standard during his time as a student at Mannix College in Charleville. He was part of the school's senior team that won consecutive Munster vocational schools' titles in 1996 and 1997, after respective defeats of St Brogan's College and Roscrea Vocational School. O'Connor also won an All-Ireland Vocational Schools' SHC medal in 1997, after scoring nine points in the 2–13 to 0–09 win over Athenry Vocational School in the final.

O'Connor also earned selection to the Cork vocational schools' team, a countywide team composed of the best players from the individual schools. He captained Cork to a 1–12 to 1–11 win over Galway in the 1996 All-Ireland final. O'Connor claimed a second All-Ireland winners' medal in this competition in 1997, after a second consecutive win over Galway in the final.

== Club career ==
O'Connor joined the Newtownshandrum club at a young age and played in all grades at juvenile and underage levels. On 19 October 1997, he was at right wing-forward when Newtownshandrum faced St. Finbarr's in the Premier County Minor Championship final. O'Connor top scored with 0-09, including six frees, in Newtown's 2–13 to 0–10 defeat. It was his last game in the grade.

O'Connor subsequently progressed onto the Newtownshandrum under-21 team. On 29 November 1998, he was at full-forward when Newtownshandrum faced Na Piarsaigh in the Cork Under-21 Championship final. O'Connor scored three points, including two in the final few minutes, in the 1–11 to 0–14 draw. The replay took place on 6 December, with Newtownshandrum winning by 1–12 to 0–07 to take their first title in 25 years. O'Connor's performance at full-forward was described as "brilliant" in the Cork Examiner.

On 12 December 1999, O'Connor was at midfield when Newtownshandrum lined out against Erin's Own in a second successive Cork Under-21 Championship final. He top scored with eight points, including five frees, and earned the man of the match award after the 1–13 to 1–07 victory.

O'Connor lined out in his last underage game with Newtownshandrum on 17 December 2000 when the club faced Glen Rovers in the Cork Under-21 Championship final. He scored 0-08 from full-forward in the 1–17 to 1–07 victory. It was O'Connor's third winners' medal in the under-21 grade.

On 15 June 1996, O'Connor made his first appearance at adult level when he was selected for the Newtownshandrum intermediate team. He scored 1–04 in Newtown's 3–10 to 0–07 defeat of Ballincollig. On 20 October, O'Connor scored 0-04 from left corner-forward in a 2–07 to 1–10 draw with Cloyne in the Cork Intermediate Championship final. The replay took place on 3 November, with O'Connor top scoring with 0–06 in Newtownshandrum's 0–12 to 0–09 victory.

O'Connor made his first appearance at senior level on 28 June 1997 and scored 1–02 in Newtownshandrum's 1–11 to 2–12 defeat by Kilbrittain in the first round of the 1997 Cork Championship.

On 8 October 2000, O'Connor was at left corner-forward when Newtownshandrum faced Erin's Own in the Cork Championship final. He top scored with six points in the 0–14 to 0–11 victory in what was Newtown's first-ever championship title.

O'Connor ended the 2001 Cork Championship as top scorer with 6-29.

On 15 September 2002, O'Connor was at full-forward when Newtownshandrum faced reigning champions Blackrock in the Cork Championship final. He scored seven points in the 1–14 to 0–12 defeat.

Newtownshandrum faced Blackrock in a second successive Cork Championship final on 12 October 2003 with O'Connor lining out at centre-forward. He gave a "sparkling display" by scoring ten points in the 0–17 to 1–09 victory. O'Connor also ended the championship as top scorer with 2-30. On 30 November, he won a Munster Club Championship medal after scoring three points in the 2–18 to 2–09 defeat of Patrickswell in the final. O'Connor scored ten points in Newtownshandrum's 0–17 to 1–06 defeat of Dunloy in the All-Ireland final on 17 March 2004. He ended the provincial and All-Ireland club championship campaigns as top scorer with 0-47.

On 16 October 2005, O'Connor won a third Cork Championship medal when he scored six points from centre-forward in a 0–15 to 0–09 defeat of Cloyne in the final. He scored six points again when Newtownshandrum defeated Ballygunner to win a second Munster Club Championship title on 4 December. O'Connor lined out in a second All-Ireland final on 17 March 2006 with Portumna providing the opposition. He scored four points, including three from frees, in the 2–08 to 1–06 defeat.

O'Connor lined out at centre-forward in a fifth Cork Championship final on 14 October 2007. He was Newtown's top scorer with 1–03 in the 1–11 to 1–07 defeat by reigning champions Erin's Own.

On 11 October 2009, O'Connor scored 1-04 from left corner-forward and won a fourth Cork Championship medal after a 3–22 to 1–12 defeat of reigning champions Sarsfields in the final. On 29 November 2009, the "ever-reliable" O'Connor scored five points when Newtownshandrum won their third Munster Club Championship after a 2–11 to 2–09 defeat of Ballygunner.

== Inter-county career ==
O'Connor first played for Cork when he lined out with the minor team on 26 June 1996. He scored one point in Cork's 0–16 to 1–09 defeat by Tipperary in the Munster Championship.

Eligible for the grade again the following year, O'Connor was again at left corner-forward and scored four points when Cork suffered a 2–12 to 0–10 defeat by eventual All-Ireland champions Clare.

O'Connor subsequently progressed onto the Cork under-21 team and made his first appearance at right wing-forward on 24 June 1998 in a 4–18 to 1–11 defeat of Clare. He was switched to left wing-forward for the next game before being dropped from the starting fifteen for the Munster Championship final on 23 August. O'Connor was introduced as a substitute and scored a point in the 3–18 to 1–10 defeat of Tipperary. He was again on the bench for Cork's subsequent All-Ireland final against Galway on 21 October. O'Connor was again introduced as a substitute in the 2–15 to 2–10 victory.

O'Connor played his last underage game for Cork on 23 August 2000 in a 4–18 to 1–06 defeat by Limerick in the Munster Championship final replay.

O'Connor had just turned 20 when he was added to the Cork senior hurling panel. He lined out in three games during the team's unsuccessful bid to retain the National Hurling League title in 1999. On 13 June 1999, O'Connor made his first championship appearance at right corner-forward and scored a point in Cork's 0–24 to 1–15 defeat of Waterford. He started at left corner-forward in the subsequent Munster Championship final on 5 July and scored two points in the 1–15 to 0–14 defeat of reigning champions Clare. On 11 September, O'Connor was again at left corner-forward for the All-Ireland final against Kilkenny which Cork won by 0–12 to 0–11. He was later nominated for an All-Star award.

On 3 July 2000, O'Connor lined out in his second Munster Championship final. He scored three points from left corner-forward in the 0–23 to 3–12 defeat of Tipperary.

O'Connor was appointed captain of the Cork senior team for the 2001 season.

On 5 May 2002, O'Connor scored two points in Cork's 2–15 to 2–14 defeat by Kilkenny in the National League final. On 29 November, O'Connor and his 29 teammates from the Cork senior team announced that they were withdrawing their services from the county in the hope of better treatment from the county board. He had a low-key role during the two-week debacle which ended with a settlement with the Cork County Board on 13 December.

O'Connor lined out in his third Munster final on 29 June 2003. As right wing-forward he scored four points in Cork's 3–16 to 3–12 defeat of Waterford. On 14 September, O'Connor was again at right wing-forward for Cork's 1–14 to 1-11 All-Ireland final defeat by Kilkenny. He ended the season by being nominated for a second All-Star award.

O'Connor was appointed captain of the Cork senior team for the 2004 season. On 27 June, he lost his first Munster Championship final when Waterford defeated Cork by 3–16 to 1-21. In spite of this defeat, Cork later qualified for the All-Ireland final against Kilkenny. A 0–17 to 0–09 victory gave O'Connor a second All-Ireland medal as well as the honour of accepting the Liam MacCarthy Cup. He ended the season by being nominated for a third All-Star award.

O'Connor won his fourth Munster Championship medal on 26 June 2005 after a 1–21 to 1–16 defeat of Tipperary in the final at Páirc Uí Chaoimh. On 11 September 2005, Cork faced Galway in the All-Ireland final for the first time since 1990. O'Connor was in his usual position of right wing-forward and scored 1–07 in a man of the match display. Cork won the game by 1–21 to 1–16, with O'Connor collecting a third All-Ireland medal. He ended the season by winning his first All-Star award.

On 25 June 2006, O'Connor won his fifth Munster Championship medal when he scored 1–01 in a 2–14 to 1–14 defeat of Tipperary for the second consecutive year. Cork subsequently qualified for a fourth successive All-Ireland final, with Kilkenny providing the opposition for the third time. O'Connor top scored for Cork with 1-04, however, Cork eventually lost the game by 1–16 to 1–13. He ended the season by being nominated for a fifth All-Star.

Following the 2006 All-Ireland final defeat Cork hurling went into decline. An All-Ireland quarter-final defeat in 2007 was followed by a second players' strike at the end of the year. This was in sympathy with the Cork senior football team. A second strike followed at the end of 2008 over the re-appointment of Gerald McCarthy as manager of the senior hurling team. All of these factors resulted in Cork's hurling team going into further decline.

In 2010 O'Connor's side looked to be moving in the right direction. Cork qualified for the final of the National League; however, victory went to Galway. The team later reached the Munster final, only to lose out to Waterford after a replay.

2011 also saw Cork enjoy little success in the championship as the team exited following a defeat by Galway in the qualifiers. Following this defeat there was speculation that O'Connor may retire from the inter-county scene. While his twin brother Jerry decided to hang up his hurley, O'Connor decided to return to training for another season. He lined out in both of Cork's opening National League games in 2012; however, in a shock announcement he decided to call time on his career in March 2012.

== Inter-provincial career ==
O'Connor has also played with Munster in the inter-provincial championship. He first lined out for his province in 2002; however, defeat was his lot. A similar fate befell the province again in 2003. In 2005 O'Connor secured his first, and only, Railway Cup winners' medal. He was a member of the team again in 2008; however, Munster lost out on that occasion again.

== Management career ==
=== Charleville ===
O'Connor's first position as a coach was with the Charleville intermediate hurling team. On 29 October 2018, he coached the team to a first ever Cork Premier IHC title after a 0–15 to 0–14 defeat of Courcey Rovers in a final replay. O'Connor's term as coach also saw the club win the Munster Club IHC title, before a defeat by Oranmore–Maree in the 2018 All-Ireland final.

=== Midleton ===
On 23 December 2019, it was confirmed that O'Connor had been appointed manager of the Midleton senior hurling team for the 2020 Championship.

== Personal life ==
O'Connor was born in the village of Newtownshandrum, County Cork to Bernie and Kathleen O'Connor (née O'Mahony). He was educated at the local national school before later attending Mannix College in Charleville. While going to school here he had his first national hurling success, when he won an All-Ireland vocational schools medal in 1997.

O'Connor currently works as a post man in the Charleville town area and part time as a hurley maker with his brother Jerry in Newtownshandrum village.

== Career statistics ==
=== Club ===
Team	Season	Cork		Munster		All-Ireland		Total	
Team	Season	Apps	Score	Apps	Score	Apps	Score	Apps	Score
Newtownshandrum	1997-98	1	1-02	0	0-00	0	0-00	1	1-02
Newtownshandrum	1998-99	1	0-07	0	0-00	0	0-00	1	0-07
Newtownshandrum	1999-00	3	0-19	0	0-00	0	0-00	1	0-19
Newtownshandrum	2000-01	5	1-32	1	1-05	0	0-00	6	2-37
Newtownshandrum	2001-02	5	6-29	0	0-00	0	0-00	5	6-29
Newtownshandrum	2002-03	5	3-31	0	0-00	0	0-00	5	3-31
Newtownshandrum	2003-04	6	2-38	2	0-10	4	0-37	12	2-85
Newtownshandrum	2004-05	5	2-29	0	0-00	0	0-00	5	2-29
Newtownshandrum	2005-06	5	0-21	2	0-14	2	0-14	9	0-49
Newtownshandrum	2006-07	3	1-21	0	0-00	0	0-00	3	1-21
Newtownshandrum	2007-08	5	2-26	0	0-00	0	0-00	5	2-26
Newtownshandrum	2008-09	3	0-22	0	0-00	0	0-00	3	0-22
Newtownshandrum	2009-10	5	3-29	3	0-23	1	0-09	9	3-61
Newtownshandrum	2010-11	5	0-24	0	0-00	0	0-00	5	0-24
Newtownshandrum	2011-12	4	0-12	0	0-00	0	0-00	4	0-12
Newtownshandrum	2012-13	3	0-08	0	0-00	0	0-00	3	0-08
Total		64	21-360	8	1-52	7	0-60	79	22-472

=== Inter-county ===
Team	Year	National League			Munster		All-Ireland		Total	
Team	Year	Division	Apps	Score	Apps	Score	Apps	Score	Apps	Score
Cork	1999	Division 1B	3	1-03	2	0-03	2	0-03	7	1-09
Cork	2000	Division 1B	6	2-10	2	0-04	1	0-01	9	2-15
Cork	2001	Division 1B	5	0-06	1	0-02	0	0-00	6	0-08
Cork	2002	Division 1B	7	0-16	1	0-08	2	0-06	10	0-30
Cork	2003	Division 1B	7	2-07	2	0-05	3	0-06	12	2-18
Cork	2004	Division 1B	2	0-06	3	2-12	4	0-18	9	2-36
Cork	2005	Division 1B	5	2-14	2	0-10	3	1-16	10	3-40
Cork	2006	Division 1A	0	0-00	1	1-01	3	1-06	4	2-07
Cork	2007	Division 1A	1	1-05	2	0-11	5	0-22	8	1-38
Cork	2008	Division 1A	5	0-26	1	1-03	4	0-29	10	1-58
Cork	2009	Division 1	3	0-21	1	0-11	2	0-13	6	0-45
Cork	2010	Division 1	5	0-21	4	2-18	2	0-13	11	2-52
Cork	2011	Division 1	6	0-22	1	0-03	3	0-03	10	0-28
Cork	2012	Division 1A	2	0-02	0	0-00	0	0-00	2	0-02
Total			57	8-159	23	6-91	34	2-136	114	16-386

== Honours ==
=== Player ===
Mannix College

- All-Ireland Vocational Schools Senior Hurling Championship (1): 1997
- Munster Vocational Schools' Senior Hurling Championship (2): 1996, 1997

Cork Vocational Schools

- All-Ireland Vocational Schools Championship (2): 1996 (c), 1997
- Munster Vocational Schools Championship (2): 1996 (c), 1997

Newtownshandrum

- All-Ireland Senior Club Hurling Championship (1): 2004
- Munster Senior Club Hurling Championship (3): 2003, 2005, 2009
- Cork Senior Hurling Championship (4): 2000, 2003, 2005, 2009
- Cork Intermediate Hurling Championship (1): 1996
- Cork Under-21 Hurling Championship (3): 1998, 1999, 2000

Cork

- All-Ireland Senior Hurling Championship (3): 1999, 2004 (c), 2005
- Munster Senior Hurling Championship (5): 1999, 2000, 2003, 2005, 2006
- All-Ireland Under-21 Hurling Championship (1): 1998
- Munster Under-21 Hurling Championship (1): 1998

Munster

- Interprovincial Hurling Championship (1): 2005

=== Individual ===
Awards

- Munster Hurling Team of the last 25 Years (1984–2009)
- All-Star awards: 2005, 2008
- GPA Gaelic Team of the Year: 2006, 2008

=== Management ===
Charleville

- Munster Intermediate Club Hurling Championship (1): 2018
- Cork Premier Intermediate Hurling Championship (1): 2018

Midleton

- Cork Premier Senior Hurling Championship (1): 2021

Cork

- All-Ireland Under-20 Hurling Championship (1): 2023
- Munster Under-20 Hurling Championship (1): 2023

Sporting positions
Preceded by Fergal Ryan	Cork Senior Hurling Captain; 2001	Succeeded by Wayne Sherlock
Preceded by Alan Browne	Cork Senior Hurling Captain; 2004	Succeeded by Seán Óg Ó hAilpín
Achievements
Preceded by D. J. Carey	All-Ireland SHC winning captain 2004	Succeeded by Seán Óg Ó hAilpín
