= 2004 All-Ireland Senior Club Hurling Championship final =

2004 All-Ireland Senior Club Hurling Championship Final
- Event: 2003–04 All-Ireland Senior Club Hurling Championship
Dunloy	Newtownshandrum
1-6	0-17
- Date: 17 March 2004
- Venue: Croke Park, Dublin
- Man of the Match: Ben O'Connor
- Referee: Barry Kelly (Westmeath)
- Attendance: 38,500

The 2004 All-Ireland Senior Club Hurling Championship final was a hurling match played at Croke Park on 17 March 2004 to determine the winners of the 2003–04 All-Ireland Senior Club Hurling Championship, the 34th season of the All-Ireland Senior Club Hurling Championship, a tournament organised by the Gaelic Athletic Association for the champion clubs of the four provinces of Ireland. The final was contested by Dunloy of Antrim and Newtownshandrum of Cork, with Newtownshandrum winning by 0-17 to 1-6.

Dunloy started quickly and opened the scoring through Colin McGuickian, however, that was the only time they were to lead during the match. Ben O'Connor levelled the scores from a free before Alan T. O'Brien completed a fine solo run by landing a point. Dunloy hit three wides, while at the other end Ben O'Connor tapped over another free to increase his side's lead. O'Connor put on a show of deadly accuracy from placed balls throughout the half. He put over three frees – the last of which could have so easily been a goal as he blasted it in low forcing goalkeeper Gareth McGee to deflect it over for a point.

Dunloy started the second half under pressure. When Martin Curry was fouled in the area for a penalty, goalkeeper McGee stepped up to blast the sliotar into the back of the net and give his side a boost. The Antrim side then closed the gap between the two sides even further after Ben O'Connor missed a straightforward free while at the other end Paddy Richmond slotted over another point for the Northerners to reduce the deficit to two points. The match was as close as Dunloy were to come as Ben O'Connor, Andy O'Brien and James Bowles all found their range to put Newtown six points ahead before Jerry O'Connor claimed the score of the afternoon as he burst through on a fine solo run. Ben O'Connor increased his personal tally to ten points, while Alan T. O'Brien put the icing on the cake, and his third of the game was to be the final point.

Newtownshandrum's victory secured their first and only All-Ireland title. They become the 21st club to win the All-Ireland title, while they are the fifth Cork representatives to claim the ultimate prize.

Dunloy's All-Ireland defeat was their second in succession and their fourth over all.

Due to the similarity of the colour of their jerseys a change was necessary. Each team donned a version of their county jersey, with Newtownshandrum wearing a red and white strip and Dunloy wearing a saffron and white strip.

== Match ==
=== Details ===
17 March 2004

Newtownshandrum	3-8 - 0-9	Dunloy
B O’Connor 0-10 (0-6 frees); AT O’Brien 0-3; Jerry O’Connor, J Bowles, I Kelleher, M Morrissey, 0-1 each.	Report	G McGhee 1-0 (pen.); L Richmond 0-2; P Richmond 0-2; C McGuckian, A Elliott, 0-1 each.

Croke Park, Dublin
Attendance: 38,500
Referee: B Kelly (Westmeath)

Newtownshandrum	Dunloy
