= 1953 Cork Intermediate Hurling Championship =

Irish hurling competition

- Dates: 3 May – 20 September 1953
- Teams: 11
- Champions: Newtownshandrum (1st title)
- Runners-up: Glen Rovers

Tournament statistics
- Matches played: 9
- Goals scored: 78 (8.67 per match)
- Points scored: 92 (10.22 per match)

The 1953 Cork Intermediate Hurling Championship was the 44th staging of the Cork Intermediate Hurling Championship since its establishment by the Cork County Board in 1909. The draw for the opening round fixtures took place on 18 January 1953. The championship ran from 3 May to 20 September 1953.

The final was played on 20 September 1953 at Mallow Sportsfield, between Newtownshandrum and Glen Rovers, in what was their first ever meeting in the final. Newtownshandrum won the match by 0–05 to 0–04 to claim their first ever championship title.

== Results ==
=== First round ===
3 May 1953 First round	Newtownshandrum	5-07 - 3-07	Rathluirc	Buttevant Athletic Grounds

3 May 1953 First round	Castlemartyr	9-05 - 2-02	Douglas	Cork Athletic Grounds

17 May 1953 First round	Redmonds	1-03 - 13-08	Ballymartle	Ballinhassig Grounds

24 May 1953 First round	Glen Rovers	6-11 - 4-05	Buttevant	Mallow Sportsfield

24 May 1953 First round	Carrigaline	w/o - scr.	Blarney

- Mallow received a bye in this round.

=== Second round ===
5 July 1953 Second round	Glen Rovers	6-03 - 6-02	Carrigaline	Manning Park

5 July 1953 Second round	Newtownshandrum	3-07 - 3-05	Ballymartle	Mallow Sportsfield

2 August 1953 Second round	Mallow	2-03 - 5-03	Castlemartyr	Fermoy Sportsfield

=== Semi-final ===
16 August 1953 Semi-final	Newtownshandrum	6-10 - 4-04	Castlemartyr	Cork Athletic Grounds

- Glen Rovers received a bye in this round.

=== Final ===
20 September 1953 Final	Newtownshandrum	0-05 - 0-04	Glen Rovers	Mallow Sportsfield
	B Troy 0-2, J Lyons 0-1, D Geary 0-1, R Troy 0-1.		D O'Sullivan 0-2, E Goulding 0-1, D Twomey 0-1.
