= 2006 All-Ireland Senior Club Hurling Championship final =

2006 All-Ireland Senior Club Hurling Championship Final
- Event: 2005–06 All-Ireland Senior Club Hurling Championship
Portumna	Newtownshandrum
2-8	1-6
- Date: 17 March 2006
- Venue: Croke Park, Dublin
- Man of the Match: Joe Canning
- Referee: Brian Gavin (Offaly)

The 2006 All-Ireland Senior Club Hurling Championship final was a hurling match played at Croke Park on 17 March 2006 to determine the winners of the 2005–06 All-Ireland Senior Club Hurling Championship, the 36th season of the All-Ireland Senior Club Hurling Championship, a tournament organised by the Gaelic Athletic Association for the champion clubs of the four provinces of Ireland. The final was contested by Portumna of Galway and Newtownshandrum of Cork, with Portumna winning by 2–8 to 1–6.

The All-Ireland final was a unique occasion as it was the first ever championship meeting between Portumna and Newtownshandrum. It remains their only clash in the All-Ireland series. Portumna were hoping to make history by winning their first All-Ireland title.

Seventeen-year-old Joe Canning got Portumna off to the perfect start when he goaled after just three minutes. On eight minutes Portumna secured their second goal when Canning scooped up a loose ball near the square and flicked a one-handed stick pass into the unmarked Niall Healy who batted home. Seconds later, Canning drove over his first free for a 2–1 to 0–00 lead. Newtown responded with two points in the space of forty seconds from their teenage sensation Cathal Naughton to open their account on the quarter-hour. Ollie Canning was switched to mark Naughton, a move which had the desired effect until the 21st-minute when a Naughton pass set midfielder Jerry O'Connor on his way for a neatly-taken goal. The sides added a point apiece before the break, with Ben O'Connor (free) and Portumna's Leo Smith raising white flags to leave it 2–3 to 1–3 at the break.

Ben O'Connor grabbed his second point – from a right wing free – three minutes into the second half to make it a two-point game, but that was as close as Newtown got. Joe Canning increased his influence when he struck the final's next four points – frees on 36, 41, 45 and 53 minutes – the third of which he earned himself for a foul by Pat Mulcahy. Newtown wing-back Mulcahy was rec carded after his second bookable offence on 57 minutes, when he lashed out at a grounded Niall Hayes in an off-the-ball incident. By that stage, Portumna were 2–7 to 1–5 to the good. Ben O'Connor traded late frees with Joe Canning before thundering in a last-gasp goal shot which Ollie Canning, elder brother of Joe, swiped away to safety off the Portumna line.

Portumna's victory secured their first All-Ireland title. They become the 22nd club to win the All-Ireland title, while they are the fifth Galway representatives to claim the ultimate prize.

== Match ==
=== Details ===
17 March 2006

Portumna	2-8 - 1-6	Newtownshandrum
J Canning 1-6 (0-6f), N Hayes 1-0, D Hayes 0-1, L Smith 0-1.		B O'Connor 0-4 (0-3f), J O'Connor 1-0, C Naughton 0-2.

Croke Park, Dublin
Referee: B Gavin (Offaly)

Portumna	Newtownshandrum
