= 1946 Cork Junior Hurling Championship =

Irish hurling competition

- Dates: 29 September - 8 December 1946
- Teams: 7
- Champions: Newtownshandrum (1st title)
- Runners-up: Clonakilty

The 1946 Cork Junior Hurling Championship was the 49th staging of the Cork Junior Hurling Championship since its establishment by the Cork County Board. The championship ran from 29 September to 8 December 1946.

The final replay was played on 8 December 1946 at the Douglas Grounds, between Newtownshandrum and Clonakilty, in what was their first ever meeting in the final. Newtownshandrum won the match by 6-03 to 1-04 to claim their first ever championship title.

== Results ==
=== Semi-finals ===
20 October 1946 Semi-final	Newtownshandrum	7-06 - 2-03	Glen Rovers	Doneraile Grounds

27 October 1946 Semi-final	Clonakilty	5-02 - 4-01	Castlemartyr	Douglas Grounds

=== Final ===
10 November 1946 Final	Newtownshandrum	4-02 - 4-02	Clonakilty	Cork Athletic Grounds

8 December 1946 Final replay	Newtownshandrum	6-03 - 1-04	Clonakilty	Douglas Grounds
