= 2004 All-Ireland Senior Hurling Championship final =

2004 All-Ireland Hurling Final
- Event: 2004 All-Ireland Senior Hurling Championship
Cork	Kilkenny
0–17	0–9
- Date: 12 September 2004
- Venue: Croke Park, Dublin
- Man of the Match: Niall McCarthy
- Referee: Aodán Mac Suibhne (Dublin)
- Attendance: 78,212

The 2004 All-Ireland Senior Hurling Championship Final was a hurling match played at Croke Park on 12 September 2004 to determine the winners of the 2004 All-Ireland Senior Hurling Championship, the 118th season of the All-Ireland Senior Hurling Championship, a tournament organised by the Gaelic Athletic Association for the champions of the four provinces of Ireland. The final was contested by Kilkenny of Leinster and Cork of Munster, with Cork winning by 0–17 to 0–9.

== The game ==
The game got off to a flying start as Kilkenny missed three early opportunities, including Eddie Brennan putting a great goal chance wide within seconds of the throw in. Cork went ahead through a Joe Deane free from 20 metres. Cork had a couple of refereeing decisions in their favour to go with that and give them the slight advantage through the first ten minutes.

Henry Shefflin got Kilkenny back on track with a point from out on the left and Cha Fitzpatrick followed up soon after with another well taken score as Cork's short puck out strategy misfired. Joe Deane was again reliable from the placed ball at short range, pointing after a James Ryall foul. Deane was also dangerous in open play with the crossbar denying him a goal, while Ben O'Connor's smashed the follow-up into the side netting. Kilkenny got the next score with Martin Comerford putting Kilkenny back into the lead and went further ahead after Shefflin pointed a free.

Cork's Brian Murphy received attention with double vision brought on by migraine, which forced him out of the game. Kilkenny got back on top after that stoppage with a Martin Comerford point. Another Deane free ended a nine-minute scoreless sequence for Cork. An exchange of wides followed as Kilkenny continued to foul at around fifty metres from their goal. Ben O'Connor got his first point as a result of one foul. Brian Corcoran got Cork's first score from play to put them within a point. Shefflin pointed the next long free for Kilkenny, replacing D. J. Carey who had been wayward. Jerry O'Connor replied for Cork.

Cork had a great start after the interval and Niall McCarthy refused what looked a good goal chance within seconds of the restart, taking a simple point instead. An exchange of points followed. Niall McCarthy's purple patch continued as he scored the point of the game from a puck out, fielding well before turning, running and striking to score. Kieran Murphy made up for a missed Ben O'Connor free by pointing a simple chance. Niall McCarthy put Cork two in front before Kieran Murphy won another free 45 metres out with Ben O'Connor taking the chance this time.

Kilkenny's response was immediate. Shefflin showed terrific skill to get a shot on target on the volley from Carey's hand pass but his effort was saved by Donal Óg Cusack in the Cork goal and from his clearance James Ryall fouled Deane on the forty, yielding another free chance. Deane pointed the free to put Cork in a commanding position. Subsequent frees from Ben O'Connor and Deane as well as a Tom Kenny point put Cork well clear. Cork conceded a '65 to Kilkenny which they defended successfully before Brian Corcoran putt the final nail in Kilkenny's coffin, grabbing a fine point from a tight angle just before the final whistle.

Cork's All-Ireland victory was their first since 1999. The win gave them their 29th All-Ireland title over all and put them as outright leaders on the all-time roll of honour.

== Match details ==
=== Statistics ===
12 September 2004
15:30 UCT+1

Cork	0–17 – 0–9	Kilkenny
J. Deane 0–5; N. McCarthy 0–3; B. O'Connor 0–3; K. Murphy 0–2; B. Corcoran 0–2; T. Kenny 0–1; J. O'Connor 0–1	(report)	H. Shefflin 0–5; M. Comerford 0–2; J. Fitzpatrick 0–1; D. Lyng 0–1

Croke Park, Dublin
Attendance: 78,212
Referee: A. Mac Suibhne (Dublin)

Cork	Kilkenny

CORK:
GK	1	Donal Óg Cusack
RCB	2	Wayne Sherlock
FB	3	Diarmuid O'Sullivan
LCB	4	Brian Murphy (substituted off) 25'
RWB	5	John Gardiner
CB	6	Ronan Curran
LWB	7	Seán Óg Ó hAilpín
MD	8	Tom Kenny
MD	9	Jerry O'Connor
RWF	10	Ben O'Connor (c)
CF	11	Niall McCarthy
LWF	12	Timmy McCarthy
RCF	13	Kieran 'Fraggy' Murphy
FF	14	Brian Corcoran
LCF	15	Joe Deane
Substitutes used:
LCB		John Browne (substituted on) 25'

KILKENNY:
GK	1	James McGarry
RCB	2	Michael Kavanagh
FB	3	Noel Hickey
LCB	4	James Ryall
RWB	5	Tommy Walsh
CB	6	Peter Barry
LWB	7	J. J. Delaney
MD	8	Derek Lyng
MD	9	Ken Coogan (substituted off) 69'
RWF	10	Henry Shefflin
CF	11	John Hoyne
LWF	12	D. J. Carey
RCF	13	James 'Cha' Fitzpatrick (substituted off) 62'
FF	14	Martin Comerford (c)
LCF	15	Eddie Brennan
Substitutes used:
MD		Conor Phelan (substituted on) 62'
RWF		Seán Dowling (substituted on) 69'

MATCH RULES

- 70 minutes.
- Replay if scores level.
- Five substitutes allowed.

Unused Cork Substitutes Paul Morrissey, Pat Mulcahy, Cian O'Connor, Graham Callanan, Paul Tierney, Mickey O'Connell, Garvan McCarthy, John Anderson, Martin Coleman, Michael Byrne, John Paul King, James Bowles Jonathan O'Callaghan Manager Donal O'Grady Trainers Seanie McGrath and Jerry Wallace Selectors Seanie O'Leary, Patsy Morrissey, John Allen, Fred Sheedy
