= 2003 Cork Senior Hurling Championship =

Annual hurling competition season

- Dates: 26 April 2003 – 12 October 2003
- Sponsor: Permanent TSB
- Champions: Newtownshandrum (2nd title); John McCarthy (captain); Ger Cunningham (manager)
- Runners-up: Blackrock; Wayne Sherlock (captain); Tim Murphy (manager)

Tournament statistics
- Matches played: 35
- Top scorer(s): Ben O'Connor (2-38)

The 2004 Cork Senior Hurling Championship was the 115th staging of the Cork Senior Hurling Championship since its establishment by the Cork County Board in 1887. The draw for the 2003 opening round fixtures took place in December 2002. The championship began on 26 April 2003 and ended on 12 October 2003.

Blackrock entered the championship as the defending champions.

On 12 October 2003, Newtownshandrum won the championship following a 0–17 to 1–9 defeat of Blackrock in the final. This was their second championship title overall and their first title since 2000.

Newtownshandrum's Ben O'Connor was the championship's top scorer with 2-38.

== Team changes ==
=== To Championship ===
Promoted from the Cork Intermediate Hurling Championship

- Delanys

== Results ==
=== Preliminary round ===
26 April 2003 Preliminary round	Douglas	0-05 - 4-13	Erin's Own	Riverstown Sportsfield, Glanmire
	G Wade 0-2, P Barry 0-2, B Boyle 0-1.		M O'Connor 1-5, S Dunne 2-1, M Dunne 1-1, K Murphy 0-3, P Kelly 0-1, K Murphy 0-1, F Murphy 0-1.	Referee: D Kirwan (Éire Óg)

=== Round 1 ===
3 May 2003 Round 1	Sarsfields	2-09 - 1-09	St. Catherine's	Fitzgerald Park, Fermoy
	K Murphy 0-4, J Murphy 1-0, G McCarthy 1-0, P Ryan 0-3, R Ryan 0-1, R Murphy 0-1.		P Cotter 1-0, M Hegarty 0-3, K Morrison 0-2, M Fitzgerald 0-2, P O'Neill 0-1, J Sheehan 0-1.

3 May 2003 Round 1	Na Piarsaigh	3-17 - 0-05	Douglas	Páirc Uí Chaoimh, Cork
	S Ó hAilpín 3-7, Stephen O'Sullivan 0-4, M Prendergast 0-1, Shane O'Sullivan 0-1, R Healy 0-1, S Óg Ó hAilpín 0-1, G Fitzgerald 0-1, G Shaw 0-1.		B Boyle 0-4, G Wade 0-1.

3 May 2003 Round 1	Delanys	0-06 - 4-19	Blackrock	Páirc Uí Chaoimh, Cork
	B Egan 0-3, J Egan 0-1, K Foley 0-1, G Healy 0-1.		A Browne 3-2, D Cashman 1-3, B Hennebry 0-3, L Meaney 0-2, A Coughlan 0-2, P Tierney 0-2, D Gosnell 0-2, B O'Keeffe 0-2, F Ryan 0-1.	Referee: P Hogan (Carrigtwohill)

3 May 2003 Round 1	Killeagh	2-11 - 2-15	St. Finbarr's	Carrigtwohill
	B Barry 2-3, M Landers 0-3, M Byrne 0-2, T Fitzgibbon 0-1, L Collins 0-1, J Deane 0-1.		K Murray 2-2, B Cunningham 0-6, A Cronin 0-2, M Ryan 0-2, C Duffy 0-1, C McCarthy 0-1, E Fitzpatrick 0-1.	Referee: K Healy (Ballymartle)

10 May 2003 Round 1	Midleton	0-12 - 1-10	Newtownshandrum	Castletownroche
	M O'Connell 0-9, L Walsh 0-2, J Moynihan 0-1.		B O'Connor 1-3, Jerry O'Connor 0-2, P Mulcahy 0-2, A O'Brien 0-2, M Morrissey 0-1.	Referee: G Harrington (Carrigaline)

10 May 2003 Round 1	Ballyhea	0-15 - 2-09	Cloyne	Moore Park, Kilworth
	N Ronan 0-8, D Ronan 0-2, I Ronan 0-2, A O'Connor 0-1, T Shanahan 0-1, S Curtin 0-1.		C Cusack 1-2, V Cusack 1-1, M Cahill 0-3, M Naughton 0-2, I Quinlan 0-1.	Referee: W Horgan

10 May 2003 Round 1	Castlelyons	1-08 - 3-13	Glen Rovers	Watergrasshill
	T McCarthy 0-5, D Wallace 1-0, T Hickey 0-2, Eamon Fitzgerald 0-1.		S Kennefick 1-2, R Kelleher 1-1, K O'Callaghan 0-4, S McGrath 0-3, G Callanan 0-1, J Anderson 0-1, D Cronin 0-1.	Referee: R Murphy (Lyre)

17 May 2003 Round 1 replay	Cloyne	5-14 - 0-12	Ballyhea	Moore Park, Kilworth
	C Cusack 4-2, I Quinlan 0-5, C O'Sullivan 1-1, M Naughton 0-3, M Cahill 0-1, L O'Driscoll 0-1, B Motherway 0-1.		N Ronan 0-9, M O'Sullivan 0-2, J O'Sullivan 0-1.

=== Round 2 ===
14 June 2003 Round 2	Duhallow	3-12 - 4-15	Muskerry	Fr. Kelleher Park, Kilbrin
	N O'Callaghan 2-1, D Crowley 0-6, D Duane 1-0, S Whelan 0-2, W King 0-1, G Buckley 0-1, K McCarthy 0-1.		M O'Sullivan 3-1, T Cronin 0-8, T O'Mahony 1-1, J Hurley 0-2, F Kelly 0-1, P Kelleher 0-1, G Russell 0-1.

14 June 2003 Round 2	Avondhu	2-18 - 1-06	St. Catherine's	Rathcormac
	J O'Callaghan 0-10, J Quinlan 2-1, S Killeen 0-3, S Stack 0-2, B Sheehan 0-1, J Mulchinock 0-1.		D Walsh 1-0, K Dineen 0-3, G Bryan 0-1, P O'Connell 0-1, M Hegarty 0-1.	Referee: K Healy (Ballymartle)

14 June 2003 Round 2	Castlelyons	1-18 - 3-14	Ballyhea	Mitchelstown
	T McCarthy 0-9, T Hickey 1-2, S McAuliffe 0-4, D Carroll 0-2, S Barrett 0-1.		N Ronan 1-10, John O'Sullivan 1-0, J O'Riordan 1-0, T Shanahan 0-1, I Curtin 0-1, S Curtin 0-1, M O'Sullivan 0-1.	Referee: R Murphy (Lyre)

14 June 2003 Round 2	Carrigdhoun	1-10 - 1-18	Imokilly	Carrigtwohill
	J Hayes 1-0, D Dineen 0-3, B Lombard 0-2, N Murphy 0-2, K O'Driscoll 0-1, B O'Driscoll 0-1, R Dwyer 0-1.		V Morrissey 1-5, N McCarthy 0-5, E Conway 0-3, L Ahern 0-2, D Barrett 0-1, B Coleman 0-1, G Melvin 0-1.	Referee: W Horgan (Brian Dillons)

14 June 2003 Round 2	Carbery	2-15 - 4-11	Seandún	Brinny
	J Nyhan 0-5, D Lucey 1-1, K O'Donovan 1-1, V O'Brien 0-4, M Walsh 0-1, K Hurley 0-1, P Ryan 0-1, D Dooley 0-1.		J Masters 2-0, D O'Mahony 0-5, J Horgan 1-1, C Hartnett 1-0, M Carey 0-2, D Lucey 0-1, K McCarthy 0-1, S McCarthy 0-1.	Referee: P Downey (Inniscarra)

15 June 2003 Round 2	Cork Institute of Technology	0-14 - 0-14	Midleton	Riverstown
	JP O'Callaghan 0-7, D O'Riordan 0-3, V Hurley 0-2, J Ceaser 0-1, D O'Sullivan 0-1.		M O'Connell 0-8, L Walsh 0-3, D Ryan 0-1, K Hurley 0-1, G Manley 0-1.	Referee: J Kearney (Na Piarsaigh)

15 June 2003 Round 2	University College Cork	1-18 - 1-08	Killeagh	Cobh
	N Maloney 1-8, T Walsh 0-3, R Flannery 0-3, M Walsh 0-1, B Carey 0-1, B Phelan 0-1, R O'Doherty 0-1.		B Rochford 1-0, M Landers 0-3, J Deane 0-2, M Byrne 0-1, B Barry 0-1, J O'Connor 0-1.	Referee: D Kirwan (Éire Óg)

21 June 2003 Round 2	Douglas	1-11 - 3-14	Delanys	Páirc Uí Rinn, Cork
	P Barry 1-6, B Boyle 0-3, J Moylan 0-1, A Joyce 0-1.		J Egan 1-4, B Egan 1-2, K Egan 0-5, M McElhinney 1-0, J O'Driscoll 0-2, R Foley 0-1.

13 July 2003 Round 2 replay	Cork Institute of Technology	1-15 - 1-20 (aet)	Midleton	Riverstown
	JP O'Callaghan 0-6, D O'Riordan 1-2, C O'Leary 0-2, G McCarthy 0-2, M Coleman 0-1.		M O'Connell 0-7, L Walsh 0-7, G Manley 1-1, G Moynihan 0-3, A Cotter 0-1, A Cahill 0-1.

=== Round 3 ===
12 July 2003 Round 3	Newtownshandrum	4-13 - 1-06	Ballyhea	Dr. Mannix Park, Charleville
	B O'Connor 1-5, M Morrissey 0-5, G O'Connor 1-0, J O'Connor 1-0, D Naughton 1-0, D Mulcahy 0-1, AT O'Brien 0-1, J Bowles 0-1.		N Ronan 1-5, D O'Riordan 0-1.

13 July 2003 Round 3	University College Cork	1-14 - 0-09	Muskerry	Ballyanly
	S Brick 1-3, N Moloney 0-2, F Doherty 0-2, M Phelan 0-2, B Carey 0-2, R O'Brien 0-2, T Kenny 0-1.		T Cronin 0-4, D Corkery 0-1, N Brennan 0-1, D Murphy 0-1, J Hughes 0-1, P Kelleher 0-1.

19 July 2003 Round 3	Blackrock	2-16 - 3-08	Delanys	Páirc Uí Rinn, Cork
	A Coughlan 1-7, B O'Keeffe 1-3, P Tierney 0-2, D Gosnell 0-2, B Hennebry 0-1, D Cashman 0-1.		M McElhinney 2-0, G Healy 1-2, J Egan 0-3, K Egan 0-2, K Foley 0-1.

20 July 2003 Round 3	Glen Rovers	0-14 - 1-13	Midleton	Páirc Uí Chaoimh, Cork
	K O'Callaghan 0-6, R Kelleher 0-2, D Dorris 0-1, D Busteed 0-1, D Cronin 0-1, S McGrath 0-1, J Anderson 0-1, S Kennefick 0-1.		L Walsh 0-8, J Moynihan 1-1, M O'Connell 0-2, S Corcoran 0-1, P Walsh 0-1.

23 July 2003 Round 3	Na Piarsaigh	2-08 - 4-10	Imokilly	Riverstown
	S Óg Ó hAilpín 1-1, S O'Sullivan 0-4, S O'Sullivan 1-0, D Mannix 0-2, P O'Sullivan 0-1.		S O'Farrell 3-1, C Burns 0-4, E Conway 1-0, B Coleman 0-2, L Aherne 0-2, G Melvin 0-1.

25 July 2003 Round 3	St. Finbarr's	1-09 - 0-14	Cloyne	Clonmult Memorial Park, Midleton
	B Cunningham 1-2, C Duffy 0-3, R O'Mahony 0-2, K Murray 0-1, A Dwyer 0-1.		I Quinlan 0-3, M Cahill 0-3, M Naughton 0-2, B Motherway 0-2, V Cusack 0-1, C O'Sullivan 0-1, I McCarthy 0-1, C Cusack 0-1.	Referee: K Healy (Ballymartle)

26 July 2003 Round 3	Avondhu	1-28 - 0-08	Seandún	Castlelyons
	J O'Callaghan 0-10, S Killeen 1-1, D Moher 0-3, M Gemmell 0-3, F McCormack 0-3, A O'Brien 0-2, B Sheehan 0-2, M Morrissey 0-1, P Burke 0-1, S Stack 0-1, T O'Riordan 0-1.		D O'Mahony 0-5, J Masters 0-1, C Hartnett 0-1, P Daly 0-1.	Referee: C McAllister (Midleton)

26 July 2003 Round 3	Sarsfields	0-18 - 1-15	Erin's Own	Páirc Uí Chaoimh, Cork
	J Murphy 0-7, G McCarthy 0-4, R Duggan 0-4, P Ryan 0-2, R Ryan 0-1.		K Murphy 0-7, F Murphy 0-4, M Dunne 1-1, S Dunne 0-2, M O'Connor 0-1.	Referee: D O'Leary (Cloughduv)

24 August 2003 Round 3 replay	Sarsfields	0-16 - 2-09	Erin's Own	Páirc Uí Chaoimh, Cork
	P Ryan 0-6, G McCarthy 0-3, J Murphy 0-3, R Ryan 0-2, R Duggan 0-1, K Murphy 0-1.		S Dunne 1-3, K Murphy 0-5, M Buckley 1-1.	Referee: D O'Leary (Cloughduv)

=== Quarter-finals ===
23 August 2003 Quarter-final	Cloyne	4-11 - 2-12	Avondhu	Páirc Mac Gearailt, Fermoy
	V Cusack 2-1, C Cusack 2-1, I Quinlan 0-5, M Cahill 0-2, M Naughton 0-1, B Motherway 0-1.		J O'Callaghan 1-4, J Quinlan 1-3, S Killeen 0-2, S Stack 0-2, D Moher 0-1.	Referee: R Murphy (Lyre)

23 August 2003 Quarter-final	Newtownshandrum	1-15 - 1-05	Imokilly	Páirc Mac Gearailt, Fermoy
	J Bowles 1-3, B O'Connor 0-4, Jerry O'Connor 0-4, AT O'Brien 0-2, D Naughton 0-1, D Mulcahy 0-1.		B Coleman 1-0, L Ahern 0-2, J Barrett 0-1, V Morrissey 0-1, D Barrett 0-1.	Referee: K Healy (Ballymartle)

23 August 2003 Quarter-final	Blackrock	3-20 - 0-11	Midleton	Páirc Uí Chaoimh, Cork
	B O'Keeffe 3-1, A Coughlan 0-8, A Browne 0-3, B Hennebry 0-2, D Cashman 0-2, P Tierney 0-1, F Ryan 0-1, L Meaney 0-1, D Gosnell 0-1.		L Walsh 0-5, M O'Connell 0-2, J Moynihan 0-1, D Ryan 0-1, G Manley 0-1, S Hennessy 0-1.	Referee: D Kirwan (Éire Óg)

17 September 2003 Quarter-final	Sarsfields	2-21 - 2-13	University College Cork	Páirc Uí Chaoimh, Cork
	J Murphy 2-4, P Ryan 0-6, R Ryan 0-4, C Murphy 0-2, K Goggin 0-2, M Cussen 0-1, J O'Connor 0-1, G McCarthy 0-1.		R O'Brien 1-3, N Maloney 0-6, P O'Doherty 1-2, C Morrissey 0-1, R Flannery 0-1.	Referee: W Horgan (Brian Dillons)

=== Semi-finals ===
28 September 2003 Semi-final	Newtownshandrum	1-16 - 2-13	Sarsfields	Páirc Uí Chaoimh, Cork
	B O'Connor 0-8, JP King 1-1, Jerry O'Connor 0-3, John O'Connor 0-2, I Kelleher 0-1, AT O'Brien 0-1.		P Ryan 0-6, G McCarthy 1-1, M Cussen 1-0, J O'Connor 0-2, J Murphy 0-2, R Ryan 0-1, C Kennedy 0-1.

5 October 2003 Semi-final replay	Newtownshandrum	0-17 - 0-14	Sarsfields	Páirc Uí Chaoimh, Cork
	B O'Connor 0-8, Jerry O'Connor 0-4, J Bowles 0-3, AT O'Brien 0-1, D Mulcahy 0-1.		P Ryan 0-7, K Murphy 0-2, J Murphy 0-2, M Cussen 0-1, T Óg Lynch 0-1, P Goggin 0-1.	Referee: W Horgan (Brian Dillons)

5 October 2003 Semi-final	Blackrock	1-12 - 1-10	Cloyne	Páirc Uí Chaoimh, Cork
	A Coughlan 0-5, F Ryan 1-1, P Tierney 0-2, B O'Keeffe 0-2, B Hennebry 0-1, L Meaney 0-1.		I Quinlan 0-4, C Cusack 1-0, P Cahill 0-1, B Motherway 0-1, C O'Sullivan 0-1, L O'Driscoll 0-1, M Cahill 0-1, D O'Sullivan 0-1.	Referee: K Healy (Ballymartle)

=== Final ===
12 October 2003 Final	Newtownshandrum	0-17 - 1-09	Blackrock	Páirc Uí Chaoimh, Cork
	B O'Connor 0-10 (0-3 frees 0-1 sideline); JP King 0-2; J Bowles 0-2; Jerry O'Connor, John O'Connor, AT O'Brien, 0-1 each.	Report	A Coughlan 1-3 (1-0 pen 0-3 frees); P Tierney 0-2 (0-1 sideline); B Hennebry 0-2; L Meaney, B O'Keeffe, 0-1 each.	Referee: C McAllister (Midleton)

== Championship statistics ==
=== Top scorers ===
Overall

Rank	Player	Club	Tally	Total	Matches	Average
1	Ben O'Connor	Newtownshandrum	2-38	44	6	7.33
2	Neil Ronan	Ballyhea	2-32	38	4	9.50
3	Adrian Coughlan	Blackrock	2-25	31	5	6.20
4	Conor Cusack	Cloyne	8-06	30	5	6.00
4	Pat Ryan	Sarsfields	0-30	30	6	5.00
5	Mickey O'Connell	Midleton	0-28	28	5	5.60
6	Johnny Murphy	Sarsfields	3-18	27	6	4.50
6	Jonathan O'Callaghan	Avondhu	1-24	27	3	9.00
7	Liam Walsh	Midleton	0-25	25	5	5.00
8	Brian O'Keeffe	Blackrock	4-09	21	5	4.20

In a single game

Rank	Player	Club	Tally	Total	Opposition
1	Setanta Ó hAilpín	Na Piarsaigh	3-07	16	Douglas
2	Conor Cusack	Cloyne	4-02	14	Ballyhea
3	Alan Browne	Blackrock	3-02	11	Delanys
3	Noel Maloney	UCC	1-08	11	Killeagh
4	Mark O'Sullivan	Muskerry	3-01	10	Duahllow
4	Seán O'Farrell	Imokilly	3-01	10	Na Piarsaigh
4	Brian O'Keeffe	Blackrock	3-01	10	Imokilly
4	Johnny Murphy	Sarsfields	2-04	10	UCC
4	Adrian Coughlan	Blackrock	1-07	10	Delanys
4	Jonathan O'Callaghan	Avondhu	0-10	10	St. Catherine's
4	Jonathan O'Callaghan	Avondhu	0-10	10	Seandún
4	Ben O'Connor	Newtownshandrum	0-10	10	Blackrock
