= 2009 Cork Senior Hurling Championship =

Annual hurling competition season

- Dates: 2 May 2009 – 11 October 2009
- Teams: 25
- Sponsor: Evening Echo
- Champions: Newtownshandrum (4th title); Dermot Gleeson (captain); Phil Noonan (manager)
- Runners-up: Sarsfields; Kieran Murphy (captain); Bertie Óg Murphy (manager)
- Relegated: Castlelyons

Tournament statistics
- Matches played: 28
- Top scorer(s): Niall McCarthy (4-27)

The 2009 Cork Senior Hurling Championship was the 121st staging of the Cork Senior Hurling Championship since its establishment by the Cork County Board in 1887. The draw for the 2009 opening round fixtures took place at the County Convention in December 2008. The championship began on 2 May 2009 and ended on 11 October 2009.

Sarsfields were the defending champions.

On 4 September 2009, Castlelyons were relegated from the championship following a 3–9 to 3–12 defeat by Carrigtwohill.

On 11 October 2009, Newtownshandrum won the championship following a 3–22 to 1–12 defeat of Sarsfields. This was their fourth championship title overall and their first in four championship seasons.

Carrigtwohill's Niall McCarthy was the championship's top scorer with 4-27.

== Results ==
=== Round 1 ===
| 2 May 2009 Round 1 | Carrigtwohill | 0-12 - 0-14 | Blackrock |

| 3 May 2009 Round 1 | Blarney | 1-09 - 2-14 | Na Piarsaigh |

| 3 May 2009 Round 1 | Sarsfields | 1-20 - 1-08 | Castlelyons |

| 3 May 2009 Round 1 | Killeagh | 3-15 - 0-16 | Bride Rovers |

| 3 May 2009 Round 1 | Glen Rovers | 1-12 - 2-15 | Newtownshandrrum | Páirc Mac Gearailt, Fermoy |
| | D Busteed 1-2, P Horgan 0-5, D Cronin 0-2, J Anderson 0-1, C Dorris 0-1, D Cunningham 0-1. | | J Bowles 2-1, B O'Connor 0-6, R Clifford 0-3, C Naghton 0-2, J O'Connor 0-1, M Bowles 0-1, J Herlihy 0-1. | Referee: G O'Connell (Lisgoold) |

| 3 May 2009 Round 1 | Erin's Own | 1-13 - 2-10 | Ballinhassig |

| 8 May 2009 Round 1 replay | Erin's Own | 1-12 - 0-13 | Ballinhassig |

| 9 May 2009 Round 1 | Cloyne | 0-12 - 1-13 | Bishopstown |

| 17 May 2009 Round 1 | Midleton | 2-13 - 2-14 | St. Finbarr's |

=== Round 2 ===
| 6 June 2009 Round 2 | Ballinhassig | 2-19 - 2-11 | Midleton | Páirc Uí Chaoimh, Cork |
| | D O’Sullivan 0-10 (0-7f, 0-1 ‘65), F O’Leary 1-2, M Coleman 1-0 (1-0 pen), P O’Sullivan 0-3, B Lombard 0-2, D Dineen, D Brennan 0-1 each. | Report | L O’Farrell 1-4 (0-2f), P O’Shea 1-1 (1-0 pen, 0-1 ‘65), P Haughney 0-2, M O’Connell (0-1f), C Lehane, S Hennessy 0-1 each. | Referee: C Lyons (Nemo Rangers) |

| 6 June 2009 Round 2 | Bride Rovers | 3-10 - 0-03 | Castlelyons |

| 6 June 2009 Round 2 | Glen Rovers | 0-16 - 0-09 | Blarney |

| 7 June 2009 Round 2 | Cloyne | 4-17 - 1-16 | Carrigtwohill |

=== Round 3 ===
| 12 June 2009 Round 3 | Newtownshandrum | 1-20 - 0-07 | University College Cork | Mallow GAA Complex, Mallow |
| | J Bowles 1-3, B O'Connor 0-6, J O'Connor 0-4, C Naughton 0-2, R Clifford 0-2, PJ Copps 0-1, P Mulcahy 0-1, J Coughlan 0-1. | | J Mulhall 0-3, S Burke 0-2, D Browne 0-1, S Cotter 0-1. | Referee: C McAllister (Aghada) |

| 13 June 2009 Round 3 | Na Piarsaigh | 1-12 - 0-11 | Bishopstown |

| 14 June 2009 Round 3 | St. Finbarr's | 1-12 - 0-12 | Cloyne |

| 14 June 2009 Round 3 | Glen Rovers | 1-18 - 0-11 | Killeagh |

| 19 June 2009 Round 3 | Sarsfields | 2-23 - 3-08 | Ballinhassig |

| 23 June 2009 Round 3 | Cork Institute of Technology | 2-23 - 2-04 | Carrigdhoun |

| 23 June 2009 Round 3 | Erin's Own | 1-16 - 1-15 | Imokilly |

| 28 June 2009 Round 3 | Bride Rovers | 1-11 - 0-13 | Blackrock |

=== Relegation play-offs ===
| 16 June 2009 Semi-final | Castlelyons | 0-10 - 0-10 | Blarney |

| 17 June 2009 Semi-final | Carrigtwohill | 3-11 - 2-14 | Midleton |

| 1 August 2009 Semi-final replay | Castlelyons | 1-13 - 0-14 | Blarney |

| 2 August 2009 Semi-final replay | Carrigtwohill | 1-20 - 2-14 (aet) | Midleton |

| 4 September 2009 Final | Carrigtwohill | 3-12 - 3-09 | Castlelyons |

=== Quarter-finals ===
| 8 August 2009 Quarter-final | Sarsfields | 1-22 - 1-09 | Na Piarsaigh | Páirc Uí Chaoimh, Cork |
| | M Cussen 1-6, P Ryan 0-7 (0-5f), C McCarthy 0-3, R Murphy 0-2, D Roche, G 0' Loughlin, C Leahy, K Murphy 0-1 each. | Report | A Ó hAilpin 1-0, C O'Mahony, P Gould, J Gardiner (0-2f) 0-2 each, R McGregor, S Glasgow, J Egan (0-1f) 0-1 each. | Referee: D Kirwan (Éire Óg) |

| 8 August 2009 Quarter-final | Newtownshandrum | 1-21 - 0-13 | Glen Rovers | Páirc Uí Chaoimh, Cork |
| | B O'Connor 1-7, C Naughton 0-4, M Bowles 0-3, J Coughlan 0-2, PJ Copps 0-2, J O'Connor 0-2, J Bowles 0-1. | | P Horgan 0-5, D Goggin 0-4, E Cronin 0-2, G Callinan 0-1, J Anderson 0-1. |

| 9 August 2009 Quarter-final | Cork Institute of Technology | 3-10 - 2-07 | Bride Rovers |

| 16 August 2009 Quarter-final | St. Finbarr's | 1-16 - 0-13 | Erin's Own | Páirc Uí Chaoimh, Cork |
| | J Fitzpatrick 1-1, G McCarthy, D O’Leary, C McCarthy (0-2f), R O’Mahony, A Fitzpatrick, K Murray 0-2 each, E Keane (0-1f), G O’Connor, M Ryan 0-1 each. | Report | E Murphy 0-8 (0-5f), C O’Connor 0-2, K Murphy, M O’Connor, M O’Carroll 0-1 each. | Referee: J Sexton (Ballyhea) |

=== Semi-finals ===
| 13 September 2009 Semi-final | Newtownshandrum | 2-23 - 3-09 | St. Finbarr's | Páirc Uí Chaoimh, Cork |
| | B O'Connor 1-6, C Naughton 0-5, Jerry O'Connor 0-4, J Bowles 1-0, R Clifford 0-3, PJ Copps 0-2, M Bowles 0-1, J Coughlan 0-1, JP King 0-1. | | K Murray 2-0, C McCarthy 0-5, A Fitzpatrick 1-1, M Ryan 0-1, R O'Mahony 0-1, G McCarthy 0-1, G O'Connor 0-1. | Referee: D Kirwan (Éire Óg) |

| 27 September 2009 Semi-final | Sarsfields | 4-18 - 0-20 | Cork Institute of Technology | Páirc Uí Chaoimh, Cork |
| | P Ryan 1-6, M Cussen 1-3, T Óg Murphy 1-3, G McCarthy 1-0, C McCarthy 0-2, R Murphy 0-1, D Kearney 0-1, W Kearney 0-1, G O'Loughlin 0-1. | | A Mannix 0-15, L McLoughlin 0-2, S O'Mahony 0-1, B Corry 0-1, T Murphy 0-1. | Referee: J Sexton (Ballyhea) |

=== Final ===
| 11 October 2009 Final | Newtownshandrum | 3-22 - 1-12 | Sarsfields | Páirc Uí Chaoimh, Cork |
| | B O’Connor 1-4 (0-2 frees); Jerry O’Connor 0-5; R Clifford 0-4; C Naughton 0-4; PJ Copse 1-1; J Coughlan 1-1; John O’Connor 0-2; JP King 0-1. | Report | P Ryan 0-5 (0-4 frees, 0-1 65); M Cussen 0-4; G McCarthy 1-0; R O’Driscoll, K Murphy, G O’Loughlin, 0-1 each. | Referee: D Kirwan (Éire Óg) |

== Top scorers ==
| Rank | Player | County | Tally | Total |
|---|---|---|---|---|
| 1 | Niall McCarthy | Carrigtwohill | 4-27 | 39 |
| 2 | Adrian Mannix | CIT | 1-35 | 38 |
| 2 | Ben O'Connor | Newtownshandrum | 3-29 | 38 |
| 4 | Pat Ryan | Sarsfield's | 1-31 | 34 |
| 5 | Eoghan Murphy | Erin's Own | 1-26 | 29 |
| 6 | Declan O'Sullivan | Ballinhassig | 0-28 | 28 |
| 7 | Patrick Horgan | Glen Rovers | 0-25 | 25 |
| 8 | Colin Murphy | Blarney | 1-20 | 23 |
| 9 | Diarmuid O'Sullivan | Cloyne | 3-13 | 22 |
| 9 | Michael Cussen | Sarsfield's | 2-16 | 22 |

=== Miscellaneous ===
- Sarsfield's qualify for back to back finals for the first time.
- Blarney return to the senior championship for the first time since 1939
