= 2000 Cork Senior Hurling Championship =

Annual hurling competition season

- Dates: 6 May 2000 – 8 October 2000
- Teams: 23
- Sponsor: TSB Bank
- Champions: Newtownshandrum (1st title); Donal Mulcahy (captain); Bernie O'Connor (manager)
- Runners-up: Erin's Own; Tony O'Keeffe (captain); P. J. Murphy (manager)

Tournament statistics
- Matches played: 32
- Goals scored: 92 (2.88 per match)
- Points scored: 827 (25.84 per match)
- Top scorer(s): Joe Deane (6-32)

The 2000 Cork Senior Hurling Championship was the 112th staging of the Cork Senior Hurling Championship since its establishment by the Cork County Board in 1887. The draw for the 2000 opening round fixtures took place on 12 December 1999. The championship began on 6 May 2000 and ended on 8 October 2000.

Blackrock were the defending champions, however, they were defeated by Midleton in Round 3.

On 8 October 2000, Newtownshandrum won the championship following a 0–14 to 0–11 defeat of Erin's Own in the final. This was their first championship title ever.

Imokilly's Joe Deane was the championship's top scorer with 6-32.

== Team changes ==
=== To Championship ===
Promoted from the Cork Intermediate Hurling Championship

- Ballincollig

== Results ==
Round 1

6 May 2000 Round 1	Castlelyons	2-07 - 2-10	Midleton	St. Catherine's GAA Grounds, Ballynoe
	T McCarthy 1-3, E Fitzgerald 0-4, B Ronayne 1-0.		P O'Brien 2-0, M O'Connell 0-5, G Manley 0-3, A Cotter 0-1, P Mullaney 0-1.	Referee: J Motherway (Aghada)

13 May 2000 Round 1	Na Piarsaigh	0-11 - 0-12	St. Catherine's	Carrigtwohill
	M Mullins 0-6, D Gardiner 0-1, G Daly 0-1, K O'Sullivan 0-1, G Shaw 0-1, C O'Sullivan 0-1.		C Casey 0-6, D Walsh 0-3, D O'Leary 0-1, M Hegarty 0-1, K Morrison 0-1.	Referee: D Kirwan (Éire Óg)

13 May 2000 Round 1	St. Finbarr's	1-13 - 0-12	Sarsfields	Páirc Uí Chaoimh, Cork
	C McCarthy 1-4, M Ryan 0-5, I O'Mahony 0-2, C Duffy 0-1, K Kelleher 0-1.		J Murphy 0-6, K Murphy 0-2, J O'Connor 0-1, P Ryan 0-1, J Barry 0-1, R Murphy 0-1.	Referee: G Harrington (Carrigaline)

14 May 2000 Round 1	Erin's Own	0-18 - 0-11	Glen Rovers	Páirc Uí Chaoimh, Cork
	M O'Connor 0-8, B Corcoran 0-2, F Horgan 0-2, S Dunne 0-2, T O'Leary 0-2, K Murphy 0-1, P Kelly 0-1.		S McGrath 0-3, L Galvin 0-3, G Foley 0-2, J Anderson 0-2, B Wall 0-1.	Referee: K Healy (Ballymartle)

14 May 2000 Round 1	Ballyhea	2-17 - 2-17	Cloyne	Moore Park, Kilworth
	N Ronan 1-9, M O'Callaghan 1-0, D Ronan 0-2, I Ronan 0-2, D O'Riordan 0-2, S Curtin 0-1, A Crowley 0-1.		D Motherway 0-9, V Cusack 1-2, D O'Sullivan 1-2, P Cahill 0-2, B Motherway 0-1, I Quinlan 0-1.	Referee: J O'Brien (Ballygiblin)

14 May 2000 Round 1	Blackrock	3-20 - 1-08	Bishopstown	Páirc Uí Chaoimh, Cork
	A Browne 0-11, S Coakley 2-1, L Meaney 0-3, B Hennebry 0-2, A Ryan 0-1, A Coughlan 0-1.		K O'Donoghue 1-0, A O'Mahony 0-3, J Murphy 0-1, M Cogan 0-1, M Murphy 0-1, M Hayes 0-1, D O'Regan 0-1.	Referee: D Kirwan (Éire Óg)

19 May 2000 Round 1 replay	Ballyhea	0-18 - 0-18 (aet)	Cloyne	Moore Park, Kilworth
	N Ronan 0-9, I Ronan 0-3, E Morrissey 0-2, S Curtin 0-1, A Morrissey 0-1, I Curtin 0-1, D Ronan 0-1.		D Motherway 0-7, V Cusack 0-4, P Cahill 0-2, D O'Sullivan 0-2, L O'Driscoll 0-2, B Motherway 0-1.	Referee: J O'Brien (Ballygiblin)

21 May 2000 Round 1	Ballincollig	1-14 - 3-23	Newtownshandrum	Mallow
	P O'Mahony 0-6, A Beale 1-2, R O'Doherty 0-4, T O'Leary 0-1, D Murphy 0-1.		B O'Connor 0-9, JP King 1-2, M Morrissey 1-2, J O'Connor 0-5, B Troy 1-0, D Mulcahy 0-3, P Mulcahy 0-2.	Referee: R Murphy (Lyre)

9 June 2000 Round 1 second replay	Ballyhea	1-09 - 3-09	Cloyne	Moore Park, Kilworth
	N Ronan 0-7, I Ronan 1-1, I Curtin 0-1.		I Quinlan 1-2, D Motherway 0-4, E O'Sullivan 1-0, D O'Sullivan 1-0, B Motherway 0-1, V Cusack 0-1, J Cotter 0-1.	Referee: J O'Brien (Ballygiblin)

Round 2

11 June 2000 Round 2	Castlelyons	0-13 - 0-05	Cork Institute of Technology	Riverstown
	E Fitzgerald 0-9, P O'Brien 0-2, C McGann 0-1, N Carey 0-1.		M O'Connell 0-2, S Hogan 0-1, D O'Brien 0-1, T Molumphy 0-1.	Referee: G Harrington (Carrigaline)

16 June 2000 Round 2	Avondhu	2-15 - 0-10	Glen Rovers	Rathcormac
	P Dineen 2-1, M Finn 0-4, J O'Callaghan 0-4, D Moher 0-2, S Kileen 0-1, F McCormack 0-1, R O'Connell 0-1, D Lynch 0-1.		B Corcoran 0-2, S McGrath 0-1, T Murphy 0-1, B O'Connell 0-1, G Foley 0-1, B Wall 0-1, G Callinan 0-1, C O'Riordan 0-1, J Anderson 0-1.	Referee: J Motherway (Aghada)

17 June 2000 Round 2	Imokilly	2-15 - 3-09	Sarsfields	Clonmult Memorial Park, Midleton
	J Deane 2-6, B Coleman 0-3, J O'Driscoll 0-2, N McCarthy 0-1, M Landers 0-1, R Lewis 0-1, J Barrett 0-1.		R Murphy 2-1, K Murphy 1-3, P Ryan 0-4, E Barry 0-1.	Referee: D Kirwan (Éire Óg)

20 June 2000 Round 2	Muskerry	4-06 - 2-10	Na Piarsaigh	Ballincollig
	K Murray 3-04, J Hurley 1-0, D O'Leary 0-1, N Brennan 0-1.		C O'Sullivan 1-2, S Glasgow 1-0, M Mullins 0-3, D Gardiner 0-2, G Daly 0-2, S O'Sullivan 0-1.

23 June 2000 Round 2	Carbery	4-16 - 1-11	Ballincollig	Coachford
	W Deasy 2-2, M Walsh 1-2, D O'Connell 1-2, D O'Donoghue 0-5, M O'Callaghan 0-3, G O'Donovan 0-1, N O'Sullivan 0-1.		R O'Doherty 0-5, A Beale 1-1, G O'Connell 0-3, T O'Leary 0-1, J O'Brien 0-1.	Referee: T Canavan (Cloyne)

24 June 2000 Round 2	Carrigdhoun	0-18 - 1-09	Bishopstown	Páirc Uí Chaoimh, Cork
	F Walsh 0-7, P Coughlan 0-2, G Cummins 0-2, B Lombard 0-2, J Murphy 0-1, D Hayes 0-1, B Hayes 0-1, B O'Driscoll 0-1, S Hayes 0-1.		D O'Regan 1-2, D O'Mahony 0-5, J Murphy 0-1, T Bogue 0-1.	Referee: P Spillane (Carrigtwohill)

30 June 2000 Round 2	Seandún	2-12 - 5-18	Ballyhea	Killavullen
	B Egan 1-7, K Foley 1-0, J O'Driscoll 0-1, G O'Neill 0-1, J Egan 0-1, J Buckley 0-1, A Cronin 0-1.		N Ronan 2-6, I Curtin 1-3, I Ronan 1-3, D Ronan 0-4, A Morrissey 1-0, S Curtin 0-1, A O'Connor 0-1.	Referee: D Kirwan (Éire Óg)

Round 3

7 July 2000 Round 3	Avondhu	1-17 - 0-14	Carrigdhoun	Watergrasshill
	J O'Callaghan 0-8, R O'Connell 1-3, D Moher 0-2, P Dineen 0-2, S Kileen 0-1, B O'Driscoll 0-1.		G Cummins 0-3, F Walsh 0-3, J Murphy 0-2, J Hurley 0-2, B Lombard 0-1, P Coughlan 0-1, S Hayes 0-1, R O'Donovan 0-1.	Referee: D Kirwan (Éire Óg)

8 July 2000 Round 3	Imokilly	4-19 - 2-09	Duhallow	Kildorrery
	J Deane 2-3, J O'Driscoll 1-2, N McCarthy 0-5, B Coleman 0-4, A Murphy 1-0, M Daly 0-3, M Landers 0-1, S O'Farrell 0-1.		D Crowley 1-5, N O'Callaghan 1-3, M Doyle 0-1.	Referee: J O'Brien (Ballygiblin)

8 July 2000 Round 3	St. Catherine's	2-08 - 4-17	Carbery	Páirc Uí Rinn, Cork
	B Cotter 2-0, K Morrison 0-3, D Walsh 0-2, M Hegarty 0-2, C Casey 0-1.		W Deasy 2-4, M Walsh 2-1, D O'Donoghue 0-6, M O'Callaghan 0-3, T Coffey 0-1, G O'Donovan 0-1, J Nyhan 0-1.

8 July 2000 Round 3	Erin's Own	3-10 - 1-08	St. Finbarr's	Páirc Uí Chaoimh, Cork
	S Dunne 2-0, J Corcoran 0-4, K Murphy 1-0, T O'Leary 0-3, M O'Connor 0-2, P Kelly 0-1.		N Horgan 1-0, M Ryan 0-3, C McCarthy 0-2, C Duffy 0-1, I O'Mahony 0-1, K Kelleher 0-1.	Referee: P O'Neill (Shamrocks)

9 July 2000 Round 3	Midleton	4-11 - 3-13	Blackrock	Páirc Uí Chaoimh, Cork
	M O'Connell 1-7, P O'Brien 2-0, G Manley 1-2, W O'Brien 0-2.		A Browne 1-6, B O'Keeffe 1-0, L Meaney 1-0, B Hennebry 0-3, D Cashman 0-2, A Cummins 0-1, S Coakley 0-1.	Attendance: 6,000; Referee: G Harrington (Carrigaline)

9 July 2000 Round 3	Muskerry	4-13 - 1-09	Ballyhea	Banteer
	T Kenny 3-4, K Murray 0-5, J Russell 1-1, S O'Donoghue 0-2, B Sheehan 0-1.		N Ronan 1-6, D Ronan 0-2, A Crowley 0-1.

9 July 2000 Round 3	Newtownshandrum	2-18 - 1-09	University College Cork	Páirc Mac Gearailt, Fermoy
	B O'Connor 0-8, J O'Connor 1-3, B Troy 1-0, P Mulcahy 0-3, D Murphy 0-2, JP King 0-1, D Mulcahy 0-1.		J Enright 1-7, J Kingston 0-1, E Bennett 0-1.	Referee: D O'Leary (Cloughduv)

16 July 2000 Round 3	Cloyne	2-12 - 1-10	Castlelyons	Páirc Lios gCúl, Lisgoold
	D Ring 1-1, V Cusack 1-1, D Motherway 0-4, D O'Sullivan 0-2, I Quinlan 0-2, E O'Sullivan 0-1, B Motherway 0-1.		E Fitzgerald 0-8, T McCarthy 1-2.	Referee: J Motherway (Aghada)

Quarter-finals

12 August 2000 Quarter-final	Muskerry	0-17 - 1-12	Midleton	Páirc Uí Chaoimh, Cork
	K Murray 0-5, J Russell 0-4, B Sheehan 0-2, E Twomey 0-2, F Sheehan 0-1, T O'Mahony 0-1, T Kenny 0-1, J Downey 0-1.		G Manley 1-2, P O'Brien 0-5, D Quirke 0-3, P Mullaney 0-1, K Roche 0-1.	Referee: J O'Brien (Ballygiblin)

12 August 2000 Quarter-final	Erin's Own	1-13 - 0-08	Carbery	Páirc Uí Chaoimh, Cork
	S Dunne 1-2, J Corcoran 0-4, M O'Connor 0-3, T O'Leary 0-2, K Murphy 0-1, F Murphy 0-1.		D O'Donoghue 0-3, M O'Callaghan 0-2, G O'Donovan 0-1, D O'Connell 0-1, W Deasy 0-1.

13 August 2000 Quarter-final	Imokilly	0-22 - 2-09	Cloyne	Clonmult Memorial Park, Midleton
	J Deane 0-10, N McCarthy 0-3, J O'Driscoll 0-2, B Coleman 0-2, J Holland 0-1, M Landers 0-1, D Barrett 0-1, E Coleman 0-1, M Daly 0-1.		C Cusack 1-0, V Cusack 1-0, D Motherway 0-3, J Cotter 0-2, I Quinlan 0-1, B Motherway 0-1, L O'Driscoll 0-1, E O'Sullivan 0-1.	Referee: W Horgan (Brian Dillons)

19 August 2000 Quarter-final	Newtownshandrum	1-10 - 0-12	Avondhu	Mannix Park, Charleville
	B O'Connor 1-2, D Murphy 0-2, J O'Connor 0-2, D Mulcahy 0-2, P Mulcahy 0-1, JP King 0-1.		J O'Callaghan 0-6, J Walsh 0-1, B O'Driscoll 0-1, S Kileen 0-1, P Dineen 0-1, D Moher 0-1, A Walsh 0-1.	Referee: J Motherway (Aghada)

Semi-finals

17 September 2000 Semi-final	Erin's Own	1-15 - 1-15	Imokilly	Páirc Uí Chaoimh, Cork
	J Corcoran 0-11, K Murphy 1-0, T O'Leary 0-1, M Mulcahy 0-1, F Horgan 0-1, B Corcoran 0-1.		J Deane 1-5, B Coleman 0-3, N McCarthy 0-2, M Daly 0-2, G Holland 0-1, D Barrett 0-1, S O'Farrell 0-1.	Referee: D Kirwan (Éire Óg)

17 September 2000 Semi-final	Newtownshandrum	1-18 - 1-14	Muskerry	Páirc Uí Chaoimh, Cork
	B O'Connor 0-7, J O'Connor 1-2, M Morrissey 0-4, P Mulcahy 0-2, JP King 0-2, D Mulcahy 0-1.		K Murray 0-8, E Twomey 1-1, D O'Leary 0-3, S O'Donoghue 0-1, J Downey 0-1.	Referee: K Healy (Ballymartle)

1 October 2000 Semi-final replay	Erin's Own	2-13 - 1-13	Imokilly	Páirc Uí Chaoimh, Cork
	J Corcoran 2-2, T O'Leary 0-3, K Murphy 0-2, M O'Connor 0-2, T Kelleher 0-1, S Dunne 0-1, P Kelly 0-1, P Geasley 0-1.		J Deane 1-8, R Dwane 0-1, D Barrett 0-1, S O'Farrell 0-1, B Coleman 0-1, M Daly 0-1.	Referee: D Kirwan (Éire Óg)

Final

8 October 2000 Final	Newtownshandrum	0-14 - 0-11	Erin's Own	Páirc Uí Chaoimh, Cork
	B O'Connor 0-6, J O'Connor 0-3, D Murphy 0-2, D Mulcahy 0-1, P Mulcahy 0-1, M Morrissey 0-1.	Report	J Corcoran 0-7, M O'Connor 0-3, T O'Leary 0-1.

== Championship statistics ==
=== Top scorers ===
Overall

Rank	Player	Club	Tally	Total	Matches	Average
1	Joe Deane	Imokilly	6-32	50	5	10.00
2	Neil Ronan	Ballyhea	4-37	49	5	9.80
3	Ben O'Connor	Newtownshandrum	1-32	35	5	7.00
4	John Corcoran	Erin's Own	2-28	34	5	6.80
5	Kevin Murray	Muskerry	3-22	31	4	7.75
6	Declan Motherway	Cloyne	0-27	27	5	5.40
7	Jerry O'Connor	Newtownshandrum	2-15	21	5	4.20
7	Eoin Fitzgerald	Castlelyons	0-21	21	3	7.00
8	Alan Browne	Blackrock	1-17	20	2	10.00
9	William Deasy	Carbery	4-07	19	3	6.33

In a single game

Rank	Player	Club	Tally	Total	Opposition
1	Tom Kenny	Muskerry	3-04	13	Ballyhea
1	Kevin Murray	Muskerry	3-04	13	Na Piarsaigh
2	Joe Deane	Imokilly	2-06	12	Sarsfields
2	Neil Ronan	Ballyhea	2-06	12	Seandún
3	Joe Deane	Imokilly	1-08	11	Erin's Own
3	Alan Browne	Blackrock	0-11	11	Bishopstown
3	John Corcoran	Erin's Own	0-11	11	Imokilly
4	William Deasy	Carbery	2-04	10	St. Catherine's
4	Barry Egan	Seandún	1-07	10	Ballyhea
4	Mickey O'Connell	Midleton	1-07	10	Blackrock
4	Johnny Enright	UCC	1-07	10	Newtownshandrum
4	Joe Deane	Imokilly	0-10	10	Cloyne

=== Miscellaneous ===
- Muskerry qualified for the semi-final stage of the championship for the first time since 1970.
- The final featured a unique pairing as it was the first ever final between Erin's Own and Newtownshandrum. Erin's Own were appearing in only their second ever final while it was a first final for Newtownshandrum.
- Newtownshandrum win their first ever title.
