= Newtownshandrum =

Village in County Cork, Ireland

Newtownshandrum Irish: Baile Nua Sheandroma
- Village
- Location in Ireland
- Coordinates: 52.347°N 8.768°W
- Country: Ireland
- Province: Munster
- County: County Cork

Population (2022)
  - Total: 433
- Time zone: UTC+0 (WET)
  - Summer (DST): UTC-1 (IST (WEST))

Newtownshandrum (Irish: Baile Nua Sheandroma) is a small village in County Cork, Ireland located 6.5 kilometres (4 mi) west of Charleville on the R515 road. The name translates from Irish to mean 'new town of the old ridge'. Historic maps from 1829 to 1841 and 1897–1913 identify the village as Newtown. Newtownshandrum is within the Dáil constituency of Cork North-West.

== Education ==
Shandrum National School is a co-educational primary school located in the village. As of 2019, the school had approximately 140 pupils with five mainstream teachers, and two special education teachers.

== Sports ==
The local Gaelic Athletic Association club, Newtownshandrum GAA club, was founded in 1896. Newtownshandrum is also home to a camogie club.

== See also ==
- List of towns and villages in Ireland
