= Jerry O'Connor =

Irish hurler

Personal information
- Born: 25 January 1979 (age 47) Newtownshandrum, County Cork, Ireland
- Occupation: Garda Síochána
- Height: 5 ft 10 in (178 cm)

Sport
- Sport: Hurling
- Position: Midfield
Club
- Years: Club
- 1996–present: Newtownshandrum
Club titles
- Cork titles: 4
- Munster titles: 3
- All-Ireland Titles: 1
Inter-county*
Years	County	Apps (scores)
2000–2011	Cork	49 (0–68)
Inter-county titles
- Munster titles: 4
- All-Irelands: 2
- NHL: 0
- All Stars: 3
- *Inter County team apps and scores correct as of 22:15, 17 October 2011.

Jerry O'Connor (born 25 January 1979) is an Irish hurler who played as a midfielder for the Cork senior team. He is regarded as one of the greatest players of his generation.

O'Connor made his first appearance for the team during the 2000 championship and was a regular member of the starting fifteen until his retirement following the conclusion of the 2011 championship. During that time he won two All-Ireland medals, four Munster medals and three All-Star awards.

At club level O'Connor is an All-Ireland medalist with Newtownshandrum. In addition to this he has also won three Munster medals and four county championship medals.

His twin brother Ben O'Connor and his younger sister Paula O'Connor also won All-Ireland medals with Cork in hurling and camogie respectively. His father Bernie O'Connor also played underage hurling with Cork.

== Playing career ==
=== Club ===
O'Connor plays his club hurling with Newtownshandrum and has enjoyed much success.

Beginning at underage levels he has won practically every hurling competition from under-12 upwards. After enjoying little success in the minor grade, O'Connor subsequently enjoyed a very productive period with the club's under-21 hurling team. Between 1998 and 2000 he picked up three consecutive winners' medals in the county under-21 championship.

In 1996 O'Connor was barely seventeen years-old when he lined out in the final of the county intermediate championship, with Cloyne providing the opposition. A 2–7 to 1–10 draw was followed by a tense replay. The final whistle in that game saw Newtown claim a 0–12 to 0–9 victory, giving O'Connor a county intermediate championship winners' medal.

In 2000 O'Connor's side lined out in their first county senior championship final. Erin's Own provided the opposition on this occasion, however, a 0–14 to 0–11 score line gave Newtown the win. It was his first county senior championship winners' medal and an historic first for the club.

After surrendering their title in 2001 and losing the final to Blackrock in 2002, Newtown continued their dominance of the club championship and reached the final for a third time in four years in 2003. For the second year in-a-row Blackrock provided the opposition. 'The Rockies', however, were now in decline and Newtown recorded a significant 0–17 to 0–9 victory. This victory allowed Netown to represent Cork in the provincial club championship, with O'Connor's side even reaching the final. Patrickswell of Limerick provided the opposition on that occasion, however, history was made as Newtown claimed a 2–18 to 2–9 victory. The club championship season culminated on Saint Patrick's Day, 2004 with an All-Ireland club final appearance. Perennial runners-up Dunloy provided the opposition and had cause for optimism. Ben O'Connor scored ten points of Newtown's tally of 0–17 and single-handedly beat the Antrim men who only recorded 1–6. It was an historic day for the North Cork parish of only eight hundred people and O'Connor collected an All-Ireland club winners' medal.

After surrendering their county title at the semi-final stage in 2004, Newtown were back in the championship decider again in 2005. Cloyne provided the opposition on that occasion, as the breakthrough teams continued to dominate. O'Connor's side, however, recorded an emphatic 0–15 to 0–9 victory over the east Cork side, giving O'Connor a third county championship winners' medal. Once again the club represented Cork and lined out against Ballygunner, however, O'Connor's side secured a 0–16 to 1–12 victory over the Waterford side. A second All-Ireland club final appearance beckoned with Portumna standing in the way of a second All-Ireland club medal. Newtwon, however, were outclassed by a hungrier side as O'Connor's team were defeated by 2–8 to 1–6.

After a few disappointing seasons, Newtownshandrum qualified for the county final again in 2009. It was a clash of the past masters and the reigning champions as Sarsfield's attempted to retain their title. While the opening half saw little separating the sides Newtown went on the rampage in the second-half. The final score of 3–22 to 1–12 gave O'Connor a fourth county winners' medal and cemented Newtownshandrum's reputation as the Cork club side of the decade.

=== Vocational Schools ===
O'Connor lined out with the Cork Vocational Schools team in the mid 90s. In 1996 he was part of the team that won the All-Ireland Vocational Schools Championship by overcoming Galway in the final

He was again part of the team in 1997 and picked up a second winners medal after another win over Glaway.

=== Inter-county ===
O'Connor's skill was quickly spotted and he soon followed his brother onto the inter-county scene. He made his debut in 2000 as Cork were installed as favourites to retain their All-Ireland title. The team got off to a good start by retaining their Munster title, however, Tipperary put up a good fight. O'Connor collected a Munster winners' medal as Cork won by 0–23 to 3–12. Cork's next game was an All-Ireland semi-final meeting with Offaly. While Cork were expected to win the game without breaking a sweat Offaly caught Cork on the hop and recorded a 0–19 to 0–15 win.

While the Cork hurling team should have gone from strength to strength as a result of a solid foundation at minor and under-21 levels, in fact the opposite happened. Embarrassing defeats in 2001 and 2002 saw the Cork hurling team reach rock bottom and call a players' strike just before Christmas in 2002. O'Connor and his brother played a low-key role in the strike, with Joe Deane, Seán Óg Ó hAilpín, Donal Óg Cusack and Diarmuid O'Sullivan taking on the roles of main spokesmen. Had the strike failed it could have meant the end of his and his teammates' careers, however, in the end the county board relented and met the demands. Although still amateur sportsmen the Cork senior hurling team were treated as professional athletes.

In 2003 Cork's players were vindicated in taking a stand as the team reached the Munster final for the first time in three years. Waterford provided the opposition on that occasion as one of hurling's modern rivalries began in earnest. An exciting game resulted between the two teams; however, victory went to Cork by 3–16 to 3–12. It was O'Connor's second Munster medal and it gave a signal that Cork were back. A victory in a replay over Wexford set up an All-Ireland final meeting with Kilkenny. In another thrilling game of hurling both teams were level for much of the game, exchanging tit-for-tat scores. A Setanta Ó hAilpín goal steadied the Cork ship, however, a Martin Comerford goal five minutes from the end settled the game as Kilkenny went on to win by 1–14 to 1–11.

2004 saw Cork reach the Munster final once again and, for the second consecutive year, Waterford provided the opposition. In what many consider to be the greatest provincial decider of them all, both sides fought tooth-and-nail for the full seventy minutes. Unfortunately for O'Connor, Cork lost the game by just a single point on a score line of Waterford 3–16, Cork 1–21. Although Cork surrendered their provincial crown they were still in with a chance of landing the All-Ireland title. After manoeuvring through the qualifiers Cork reached a second consecutive All-Ireland final and, once again, Kilkenny provided the opposition. This game took on a life of its own for a number of reasons. Chief among these was that Kilkenny were attempting to capture a third All-Ireland in-a-row and go one ahead of Cork in the All-Ireland roll of honour. The game was expected to be another classic; however, a damp day put an end to this. The first half was a low-scoring affair and provided little excitement for fans. The second-half saw Cork completely take over. For the last twenty-three minutes Cork scored nine unanswered points and went on to win the game by 0–17 to 0–9. It was O'Connor's first All-Ireland winners' medal.

In 2005 Cork were on form again. They won back the provincial crown that year with a 1–12 to 1–16 victory over Tipperary. It was O'Connor's third Munster winners' medal as Cork went on the march for glory once again. While it was expected that Cork and Kilkenny would do battle again in a third consecutive All-Ireland final Galway were the surprise winners of the second semi-final. It was the first meeting of Cork and Galway in an All-Ireland final since 1990 and even more daunting was that the men from the west had never beaten Cork in a championship decider. Once again neither side broke away into a considerable lead, however, at the final whistle Cork were ahead by 1–21 to 1–16. For the second year in-a-row Cork were the All-Ireland champions and O'Connor collected his second winners' medal. Both Jerry and his brother Ben finished off the year by becoming the first set of twins to be presented with All-Star awards.

2006 saw Cork turn their attentions to a first three-in-a-row of All-Ireland titles since 1978. The provincial decider saw Cork take on Tipp for the second consecutive year. Once again O'Connor contributed greatly to Cork's 2–11 to 1–11 victory over their age-old rivals. Subsequent victories over Limerick and Waterford saw Cork qualify for their fourth consecutive All-Ireland final and for the third time Kilkenny were the opponents. Like previous encounters neither side took a considerable lead, however, Kilkenny had a vital goal from Aidan Fogarty. Cork were in arrears coming into the final few minutes, however, Ben O'Connor goaled for Cork. It was too little too late as 'the Cats' denied 'the Rebels' the three-in-a-row on a score line of 1–16 to 1–13.

Following the 2006 All-Ireland final defeat Cork hurling went into decline. An All-Ireland quarter-final defeat in 2007 was followed by a second players' strike at the end of the year. This was in sympathy with the Cork senior football team. A second strike followed at the end of 2008 over the re-appointment of Gerald McCarthy as manager of the senior hurling team. All of these factors resulted in Cork's hurling team going into further decline.

In 2010 O'Connor's side looked to be moving in the right direction. Cork qualified for the final of the National League, however, victory went to Galway. The team later reached the Munster final, only to lose out to Waterford after a replay.

2011 also saw Cork enjoy little success in the championship as the team exited following a defeat by Galway in the qualifiers. Following this defeat O'Connor decided to retire from inter-county hurling.

== Personal life ==
O'Connor was born in the village of Newtownshandrum, County Cork to Bernie and Kathleen O'Connor (née O'Mahony). He was educated at the local national school before later attending Mannix College in Charleville. While going to school here he had his first national hurling success, when he won an All-Ireland vocational schools medal in 1997.

O'Connor currently works as a member of the Garda Síochána.

== Honours ==
=== Team ===
Mannix College

- All-Ireland Vocational Schools Championship (1): 1997
- Munster Vocational Schools' Senior Hurling Championship (2): 1996, 1997

Newtownshandrum

- All-Ireland Senior Club Hurling Championship (1): 2004
- Munster Senior Club Hurling Championship (3): 2003, 2005, 2009
- Cork Senior Club Hurling Championship (4): 2000, 2003, 2005, 2009
- Cork Intermediate Club Hurling Championship (1): 1996
- Cork Under-21 Club Hurling Championship (3): 1998, 1999, 2000

Cork Vocational Schools

- All-Ireland Vocational Schools Championship (2): 1996, 1997
- Munster Vocational Schools Championship (2): 1996, 1997

Cork

- All-Ireland Senior Hurling Championship (2): 2004, 2005
- Munster Senior Hurling Championship (4): 2000, 2003, 2005, 2006

=== Individual ===
Awards

- Munster Hurling Team of the last 25 Years (1984–2009)
- All Stars Hurler of the Year (1): 2005
- Texaco Hurler of the Year (1): 2005
- All Stars (3): 2004, 2005, 2006
- GPA Gaelic Team of the Year (1): 2006

Awards
Preceded by Seán Óg Ó hAilpín (Cork)	Vodafone Hurler of the Year; 2005	Succeeded by Henry Shefflin (Kilkenny)
Preceded by Seán Óg Ó hAilpín (Cork)	Texaco Hurler of the Year; 2005	Succeeded by Henry Shefflin (Kilkenny)
