= 2003–04 All-Ireland Senior Club Hurling Championship =

All-Ireland Senior Club Hurling Championship 2003–04
Championship Details
- Dates: 18 October 2003 – 17 March 2004
- Teams: 28

All Ireland Champions
- Winners: Newtownshandrum (1st win)
- Captain: John McCarthy
- Manager: Ger Cunningham

All Ireland Runners-up
- Runners-up: Dunloy
- Captain: Malachy Molloy
- Manager: Seán McLean

Provincial Champions
- Munster: Newtownshandrum
- Leinster: O'Loughlin Gaels
- Ulster: Dunloy
- Connacht: Portumna

Championship Statistics
- Matches Played: 29
- Total Goals: 69 (2.37 per game)
- Total Points: 696 (24.00 per game)
- Top Scorer: Ben O'Connor (0–47)

The 2003–04 All-Ireland Senior Club Hurling Championship was the 34th staging of the All-Ireland Senior Club Hurling Championship, the Gaelic Athletic Association's premier inter-county hurling tournament for senior clubs. The championship ran from 18 October 2003 to 17 March 2004.

The defending champion was Birr; however, the club was beaten by O'Loughlin Gaels in the Leinster final. Clonguish and Portumna made their championship debuts, while Roscommon's Athleague returned after a 25-year absence.

The All-Ireland final was played at Croke Park in Dublin on 17 March 2004, between Newtownshandrum of Cork and Dunloy of Antrim, in what was a first championship meeting between the teams. Newtownshandrum won the match by 0–17 to 1–06 to claim a first title.

Newtownshandrum's Ben O'Connor was the championship's top scorer with 0–47.

== Team summaries ==
| Team | County | Most recent success | | |
| Team | County | All-Ireland | Provincial | County |
|---|---|---|---|---|
| Athleague | Roscommon | | | 1978 |
| Ballygalget | Down | | 1998 | 1999 |
| Birr | Offaly | 2003 | 2002 | 2002 |
| Castlepollard | Westmeath | | | 1997 |
| Castletown | Laois | | | 2002 |
| Clarecastle | Clare | | 1997 | 1997 |
| Clonguish | Longford | | | |
| Coill Dubh | Kildare | | | 2000 |
| Craobh Chiaráin | Dublin | | | 2001 |
| Dunloy | Antrim | | 2002 | 2002 |
| Fr Murphy's | London | | | 2001 |
| Glenealy | Wicklow | | | 1996 |
| Keady Lámh Dhearg | Armagh | | | 2002 |
| Kevin Lynch's | Derry | | | 1998 |
| Kilmessan | Meath | | | 1996 |
| Kilmoyley | Kerry | | | 2002 |
| Knockbridge | Louth | | | 2001 |
| Mount Sion | Waterford | | 2002 | 2002 |
| Naomh Eoin | Carlow | | | 1998 |
| Newtownshandrum | Cork | | | 2000 |
| O'Loughlin Gaels | Kilkenny | | | 2001 |
| Patrickswell | Limerick | | 1990 | 2000 |
| Portumna | Galway | | | |
| Rathnure | Wexford | | 1998 | 2002 |
| St Mary's | Leitrim | | | 2002 |
| Toomevara | Tipperary | | 1993 | 2001 |
| Tooreen | Mayo | | | 1999 |
| Tubbercurry | Sligo | | | 2002 |

== Connacht Senior Club Hurling Championship ==
=== Connacht quarter-finals ===
| 18 October 2003 Quarter-final | Tooreen | 0–12 – 1–07 | Tubbercurry | Castlerea Grounds |
| | A Hession 0–5 (0-1f), A freeman 0-3f, S Hunt 0–2, M Devanney and R Robinson 0–1 each. | | P Severs 1–6 (1-4f), D Severs 0–1. |

| 26 October 2003 Quarter-final | St. Mary's | 1–08 – 0–12 | Athleague | Páirc Sheáin Mhic Dhiarmada |
| | C Cunniffe 0–6, J Beirne 1–0, J Goldrick 0–1, T McLoughin 0–1. | | K Regan 0–4, P Cuddy 0–3, T Reddington 0–2, M Connaughton 0–2, T Farrell 0–1. |

=== Connacht semi-final ===
| 1 November 2003 Semi-final | Athleague | 0–12 – 1–08 | Tooreen | Castlerea Grounds |
| | K Regan 0–6, P Cuddy 0–4, M Connaughton 0–3, S Regan 1–0, A Cunniffe 0–2. | (report) | A Freeman 0–4, D Greally and A Hession 1–0 each, M French 0–2, S Ganley, S Hunt and R Robinson 0–1 each. |

=== Connacht final ===
| 16 November 2003 Final | Portumna | 0–17 – 0–05 | Athleague | Athleague Sportsfield |
| | F Canning 0–5, N Hayes 0–4, D Canning 0–4, D Hayes 0–2, I Muldoon 0–1, A Smith 0–1. | (report) | T Reddington 0–2, P Cuddy 0–1, A Cuniffe 0–1, K Regan 0–1. | Referee: M Carroll (Roscommon) |

== Leinster Senior Club Hurling Championship ==
=== Leinster first round ===
| 19 October 2003 First round | Glenealy | 0–06 – 2–11 | Castletown | Aughrim Park |
| | W O'Gorman 0–2, E Glynn 0–2, M McDonald, K Snell 0–1. | Report | P Phelan 2–4, D Cuddy 0–2, J Hoban 0–2, P Cuddy, O Dooley, B McKelvey 0–1 each. | Referee: J Kelly (Wexford) |

| 19 October 2003 First round | Naomh Eoin | 1–10 – 2–07 | Knockbridge | Páirc an Chuinnigh |
| | J Quirke (1–1), D Murphy (0–3, 3 frees), S Smithers (0–2), S Kavanagh, A Curry, K Nolan (free), R Foley (0–1 each). | Report | P Dunne (1–2, 3 frees), P Kieran (1–0), S Byrne (0–3, 1 free), D Dunne, R Byrne (0–1 each). | Referee: J McGrath (Westmeath) |

| 19 October 2003 First round | Clonguish | 1–06 – 5–13 | Coill Dubh | Pearse Park |
| | P Barden 1–1, J Minnock (f), B Burke, T Prunty, D Corcoran, C Finnucane 0–1 each. | Report | A McAndrew 3–4, D Hughes 2–1, T Carew 0–3 (3f), N O'Callaghan 0–2, Chris Byrne, Colm Byrne (f), D Doyle 0–1 each. |

| 19 October 2003 First round | Castlepollard | 1–11 – 0–16 | Kilmessan | Cusack Park |
| | D McCormack 1–2, A Devine 0–4 (2f 1 '65', 1 sideline cut), K Brazil, B Kennedy 0–2 each, D Devine 0–1. | Report | N Horan (0–11) (7f, 1 '65'), J Keena 0–2, L Maguire, M Reilly, S Clynch 0–1 each. |

| 27 October 2003 First round replay | Naomh Eoin | 6–10 – 2–05 | Knockbridge | Dr Cullen Park |
| | D Murphy (2–3), B Murphy (2–1), R Foley (2–0), D Roberts (0–2), Kevin Nolan (0–1), A Curry (0–1), S Kavanagh (0–1). | | P Kiernan (1–0), S Kerrigan (1–0), S Byrne (0–3), D Dunne (0–1), P Dunne (0–1). | Referee: B Gavin (Offaly) |

=== Leinster quarter-finals ===
| 2 November 2003 Quarter-final | Castletown | 0–14 – 1–09 | Craobh Chiaráin | O'Moore Park |
| | P Phelan 0–5 (1f); Paul Cuddy 0–3 (1 '65, 2fs); Pauric Cuddy, J Hooban, D Cuddy, F O'Sullivan, J O'Sullivan, B McKelvey 0–1 each. | (report) | C Ring 0–6 (3fs); A McCrabbe 1–0; S Mulhall 0–2; D Kirwan 0–1. | Referee: D Murphy (Wexford) |

| 2 November 2003 Quarter-final | Kilmessan | 1–09 – 4–12 | Rathnure | Páirc Tailteann |
| | N Horan 1–3; G O'Neill, S Clynch, M Reilly, L Maguire, J Keena J Horan 0–1 each. | (report) | R Flynn 1–5; R Codd 1–4; S O'Neill 1–1; B O'Leary 1–0; J O'Connor 0–2. | Referee: E Morris (Dublin) |

| 2 November 2003 Quarter-final | Naomh Eoin | 2–07 – 0–17 | Birr | Dr Cullen Park |
| | R Foley (1–2), P Quirke (1–0), J Watters (0–2), D Murphy (0–2 frees), S Kavanagh (0–1 free). | (report) | R Hanniffy (0–7, 5 frees), S Browne (0–4), P Molloy (0–3), D Hayden (0–2), P O'Meara (0–1). | Referee: S Whelan (Wexford) |

| 9 November 2003 Quarter-final | Coill Dubh | 0–12 – 0–21 | O'Loughlin Gaels | Seán Tierney Park |
| | Tom Carew (0–5, 4 frees), Colm Byrne (0–3, 3 frees), A McAndrew (0–2), D Doyle (0–1), J Byrne (0–1). | (report) | B Dowling (0–5), M Nolan (0–5), A Geoghegan (0–3), N Skehan (0–3, 1 free), S Cummins (0–2), M Comerford (0–2), J Comerford (0–1). | Referee: F Smith (Meath) |

=== Leinster semi-finals ===
| 16 November 2003 Semi-final | Birr | 4–17 – 1–09 | Castletown | Nowlan Park |
| | M Dwane 2–0; D Hayden 0–5 (1f); D Pilkington 1–1; P O'Meara 0–3; J Pilkington 1–0; R Hanniffy and G Hanniffy 0–2 each; Brian Whelahan 0–2 (1f); S Browne and N Rodgers 0–1 each. | (report) | P Phelan 1–2 (2f); JR Kingston 0–3; Paul Cuddy 0–2 (1f); C Cuddy and D Cuddy 0–1 each. | Referee: E Morris (Dublin) |

| 16 November 2003 Semi-final | O'Loughlin Gaels | 0–20 – 2–11 | Rathnure | Dr Cullen Park |
| | N Skehan 0–10 (0–7 frees); M Comerford 0–3; B Dowling, M Nolan and J Comerford 0–2 each; C Furlong 0–1. | | P Codd 1–4 (1–2 frees); N Higgins 1–1; M Byrne and B O'Leary 0–2 each; T Hogan and R Codd 0–1 each. | Referee: P Aherne (Carlow) |

=== Leinster final ===
| 30 November 2003 Final | O'Loughlin Gaels | 0–15 – 0–09 | Birr | O'Moore Park |
| | N Skehan 0–8 (0–7 frees, 0–1 seventy); B Dowling 0–2; M Comerford, A Geoghegan, N Bergin, M Nolan and C Furlong 0–1 each. | | R Hanniffy 0–5 (0–4 frees); J Pilkington 0–2; P Carroll and Brian Whelahan (free) 0–1 each. | Referee: J Kelly (Wexford) |

== Munster Senior Club Hurling Championship ==
=== Munster quarter-finals ===
| 26 October 2003 Quarter-final | Toomevara | 3–18 – 2–11 | Kilmoyley | Semple Stadium |
| | W Ryan (2–1), K Dunne (0–7), J O’Brien (1–2), P O’Brien (0–4), T Dunne (0–1), F Devaney (0–1), M Bevans (0–1), K Cummins (0–1). | | C Walsh (1–3), S Brick (0–5), P O’Sullivan (1–0), J McCarthy (0–1), B Brick (0–1), M Murnane (0–1). | Referee: D Richardson (Limerick) |

| 26 October 2003 Quarter-final | Clarecastle | 1–14 – 2–13 | Patrickswell | Cusack Park |
| | K Ralph 0–8 (0–5 frees); A O’Loughlin 1–2; S Moloney 0–2; A Daly 0–1 (65); D Quinn 0–1. | | D O’Grady 1–4; E Foley 1–2; P O’Grady 0–5 (0–4 frees); A Carmody, J McDermott 0–1. | Referee: J McDonnell (Tipperary) |

=== Munster semi-finals ===
| 9 November 2003 Semi-final | Toomevara | 1–09 – 0–15 | Newtownshandrum | Semple Stadium |
| | W Ryan 1–2; K Dunne 0–3 (frees); P O’Brien 0–2 (0–1 free); M Bevans, B Dunne, 0–1 each. | | B O’Connor 0–7 (0–3 frees); John O’Connor 0–3; Jerry O’Connor 0–2; M Farrell 0–2; JP King 0–1. | Referee: M Wadding (Waterford) |

| 16 November 2003 Semi-final | Patrickswell | 0–16 – 1–11 | Mount Sion | Gaelic Grounds |
| | P O'Grady (0–9, 0–5 frees, 0–3 65s); J McDermott (0–2); K Carey (0–2); P O'Reilly, D O'Grady, E Foley (0–1) each. | | K McGrath (0–5, frees); E Kelly (0–4, 0–2 frees); B Browne (1–0); M White, E McGrath (0–1) each. | Referee: W Barrett (Tipperary) |

=== Munster final ===
| 30 November 2003 Final | Newtownshandrum | 2–18 – 2–09 | Patrickswell | Semple Stadium |
| | J Bowles 2–3; JP King 0–4; Jerry O'Connor 0–4; B O'Connor 0–3 (0–2 frees); AT O'Brien, John O'Connor, D Mulcahy, M Morrissey, 0–1 each. | | D O'Grady 2–2; E Foley 0–3; P O'Grady 0–3 (frees); G Kirby 0–1 (free). | Referee: S McMahon (Clare) |

== Ulster Senior Club Hurling Championship ==
=== Ulster semi-finals ===
| 26 October 2003 Semi-final | Dunloy | 1–23 – 0–08 | Ballygalget | Casement Park |
| | Greg O'Kane 0–7, A Elliott 0–6, F Quinn 1–2, P Richmond 0–2, N Elliott 0–2, M Curry 0–1, C McGuckian 0–1, D McMullan 0–1, Gary O'Kane 0–1. | (report) | J McGrattan 0–4, P Monan 0–2, M Coulter 0–2. | Referee: G Devlin (Armagh) |

| 2 November 2003 Semi-final | Kevin Lynch's | 3–13 – 1–10 | Keady Lámh Dhearg | O'Neill Park |
| | G McGonigle (1–10), R McCloskey (1–0), O Farren (0–1), K Hinphey (0–1), P Farren (0–1). | (report) | G Enright (1–6), P McCormack (0–1), K Hatzer (0–1), B McCormack (0–1), P McBrien (0–1). | Referee: T McIntyre (Antrim) |

=== Ulster final ===
| 9 November 2003 Final | Dunloy | 3–19 – 0–09 | Kevin Lynch's | Casement Park |
| | D Quinn (2–1), Greg O'Kane (0–7, five frees), P Richmond (1–1), A Elliott (0–4), Colm Cunning (0–2), C McGuckian (0–1), Conor Cunning (0–1), L Richmond (0–1), Gary O'Kane (0–1, a 65). | (report) | G McGonigle (0–8, all frees), B Kelly (0–1). |

== All-Ireland Senior Club Hurling Championship ==
=== All-Ireland quarter-final ===
| 6 December 2003 Quarter-final | Fr Murphy's | 1–05 – 1–14 | Newtownshandrum | Emerald GAA Grounds |
| | R Devlin (1–0), S Byrne (0–2), E Kinlon (0–2), JP Byrne (0–1). | (report) | B O'Connor (0–9), J Bowles (1–0), P Noonan (0–2), M Farrell (0–1), G O'Connor (0–1), I Kelleher (0–1). | Referee: T McIntyre (Antrim) |

=== All-Ireland semi-finals ===
| 15 February 2004 Semi-final | Dunloy | 2–13 – 2–10 | Portumna | St Tiernach's Park |
| | P Richmond (1–3), C McGuckian (1–2), Greg O'Kane (0–3), D Quinn (0–1), Gary O'Kane (0–1), C Cunning (0–1), G McGhee (0–1), P McMullan (0–1). | (report) | D Hayes (1–1), K Hayes (1–1), F Canning (0–3), A Smith (0–2), D Canning (0–2), O Canning (0–1). | Referee: B Kelly (Westmeath) |

| 15 February 2004 Semi-final | Newtownshandrum | 1–16 – 0–19 | O'Loughlin Gaels | Semple Stadium |
| | B. O'Connor 0–10 (0–7 frees); D. O'Riordan 1–0; J. Bowles 0–2; D. Mulcahy, P. Mulcahy, A.T. O'Brien, Jerry O'Connor, 0–1 each. | (report) | N. Skehan 0–11 (0–9 frees); M. Nolan 0–4; B. Dowling 0–2; M. Comerford 0–2. | Referee: S Roche (Tipperary) |

| 21 February 2004 Semi-final replay | Newtownshandrum | 0–14 – 1–08 | O'Loughlin Gaels | Semple Stadium |
| | B. O'Connor 0–8 (0–5 frees); JP King 0–3; J. O'Connor 0–2; D. O'Riordan 0–1. | (report) | M. Nolan 1–1; B. Dowling 0–2; N. Skehan 0–2 (frees); N. Bergin, J. Comerford, C. Furlong, 0–1 each. | Referee: P Horan (Offaly) |

=== All-Ireland final ===
| 17 March 2004 Final | Newtownshandrum | 0–17 – 1–06 | Dunloy | Croke Park |
| | B O'Connor 0–10 (0–6 frees); AT O'Brien 0–3; Jerry O'Connor, J Bowles, I Kelleher, M Morrissey 0–1 each. | (report) | G McGhee 1–0 (pen.); L Richmond 0–2; P Richmond 0–2; C McGuckian, A Elliott 0–1 each. | Referee: B Kelly (Westmeath) |

== Championship statistics ==
=== Top scorers ===
Overall

| Rank | Player | Team | Tally | Total | Matches | Average |
|---|---|---|---|---|---|---|
| 1 | Ben O'Connor | Newtownshandrum | 0–47 | 47 | 6 | 7.83 |
| 2 | Nigel Skehan | O'Loughlin Gaels | 0–34 | 34 | 5 | 8.80 |
| 3 | Geoffrey McGonagle | Kevin Lynch's | 1–18 | 21 | 2 | 10.50 |
| 4 | Patrick Phelan | Castletown | 3–11 | 20 | 3 | 6.66 |
| 5 | Nicky Horan | Kilmessan | 1–14 | 17 | 2 | 8.50 |
| 5 | Gregory O'Kane | Dunloy | 0–17 | 17 | 3 | 5.66 |
| 5 | Paul O'Grady | Patrickswell | 0–17 | 17 | 3 | 5.66 |
| 8 | Maurice Nolan | O'Loughlin Gaels | 1–13 | 16 | 5 | 3.20 |
| 8 | Declan O'Grady | Patrickswell | 0–17 | 17 | 3 | 5.66 |
| 10 | Adrian McAndrew | Coill Dubh | 3-06 | 15 | 2 | 7.50 |
| 10 | James Bowles | Newtownshandrum | 3-06 | 15 | 6 | 2.50 |

Single game

| Rank | Player | Team | Tally | Total | Opposition |
|---|---|---|---|---|---|
| 1 | Adrian McAndrew | Coill Dubh | 3-04 | 13 | Clonguish |
| 1 | Geoffrey McGonagle | Kevin Lynch's | 1–10 | 13 | Keady Lámh Dhearg |
| 3 | Nicky Horan | Kilmessan | 0–11 | 11 | Castlepollard |
| 3 | Nigel Skehan | O'Loughlin Gaels | 0–11 | 11 | Newtownshandrum |
| 5 | Patrick Phelan | Castletown | 2-04 | 10 | Glenealy |
| 5 | Nigel Skehan | O'Loughlin Gaels | 0–10 | 10 | Rathnure |
| 5 | Ben O'Connor | Newtownshandrum | 0–10 | 10 | O'Loughlin Gaels |
| 5 | Ben O'Connor | Newtownshandrum | 0–10 | 10 | Dunloy |
| 9 | Des Murphy | Naomh Eoin | 2-03 | 9 | Knockbridge |
| 9 | James Bowles | Newtownshandrum | 2-03 | 9 | Patrickswell |
| 9 | Paul Seavers | Tubbercurry | 1-06 | 9 | Tooreen |
| 9 | Gerard Enright | Keady Lámh Dhearg | 1-06 | 9 | Kevin Lynch's |
| 9 | Paul O'Grady | Patrickswell | 0-09 | 9 | Mount Sion |
| 9 | Ben O'Connor | Newtownshandrum | 0-09 | 9 | Fr. Murphy's |
