= Newtownshandrum GAA =

Gaelic games club in County Cork, Ireland

Newtownshandrum
- Baile Nua Sheandroma
- Founded: 1896
- County: Cork
- Nickname: Newtown
- Colours
- Grounds: Newtownshandrum GAA Field
- Coordinates: 52°20′44″N 8°46′08″W

Playing kits
Standard colours

Senior Club Championships
	All Ireland	Munster champions	Cork champions
Hurling:	1	3	4

Newtownshandrum GAA is a Gaelic Athletic Association club in Newtownshandrum, County Cork, Ireland. The club is affiliated to the North Cork Board and is exclusively concerned with the game of hurling.

== History ==
Located in the village of Newtownshandrum, on the Cork-Limerick border, Newtownshandrum GAA Club was established in 1896. The club spent much of its early existence in the junior grade before making its breakthrough in 1939 by winning the North Cork JHC title. Newtown won four divisional titles before claiming the Cork JHC title and promotion in 1946, after beating Clonakilty in a replay.

After seven seasons in the upper grade, a period which also included two final defeats, Newtownshandrum won the Cork IHC title and secured senior status in 1953, after a defeat of Glen Rovers. The club eventually found itself back in the junior ranks and claimed a second Cork JHC title when, in 1968, they beat Inniscarra in the final. There were also further Cork IHC title successes in 1976, 1981 and 1996.

After only just four seasons in the top tier of Cork hurling, Newtownshandrum claimed the Cork SHC title, following a 0–14 to 0–11 defeat of Erin's Own in the final. The club claimed its second SHC title when, in 2003, Newtown beat Blackrock by 0–17 to 1–09. The Munster Club SHC title was added shortly after, before Newtown beat Dunloy by 0-17 to 1-06 in the 2004 All-Ireland Club SHC final.

Newtownshandrum won a third Cork SHC title after a defeat of Cloyne in 2005. This was again followed by Newtown claiming a second Munster Club SHC title, however, the club faced defeat by Portumna in the 2006 All-Ireland Club SHC final. Newtownshandrum rounded off their most successful era ever by securing another set of Cork SHC and Munster Club SHC titles in 2009.

== Honours ==
- All-Ireland Senior Club Hurling Championship (1): 2004
- Munster Senior Club Hurling Championship (3): 2003, 2005, 2009
- Cork Senior Hurling Championship (4): 2000, 2003, 2005, 2009
- Cork Intermediate Hurling Championship (4): 1953, 1976, 1981, 1996
- Cork Junior A Hurling Championship (2): 1946, 1968
- North Cork Junior A Hurling Championship (9): 1939, 1940, 1944, 1946, 1951, 1952, 1968, 1992, 2013
- Cork Under-21 Hurling Championship (6): 1973, 1998, 1999, 2000, 2010, 2025
- Cork Premier 2 Minor Hurling Championship (2): 2009, 2024
- Cork Minor A Hurling Championship (1): 1999

== Notable players ==
- Pat Mulcahy: All-Ireland SHC-winner (2004, 2005)
- Cormac O'Brien: All-Ireland U20HC-winner (2020, 2021)
- Ben O'Connor: All-Ireland SHC-winner (1999, 2004, 2005)
- Jerry O'Connor: All-Ireland SHC-winner (2004, 2005)
- Tim O'Mahony: National Hurling League-winner (2025)
