= 2000 All-Ireland Senior Hurling Championship =

Championship details
- Dates: 6 May – 10 September 2000
- Teams: 19

All-Ireland champions
- Winning team: Kilkenny (26th win)
- Captain: Willie O'Connor
- Manager: Brian Cody

All-Ireland Finalists
- Losing team: Offaly
- Captain: Johnny Dooley
- Manager: Pat Fleury

Provincial champions
- Munster: Cork
- Leinster: Kilkenny
- Ulster: Derry
- Connacht: Not Played

Championship statistics
- No. matches played: 24
- Goals total: 66
- Points total: 717
- Top Scorer: Johnny Dooley (0–41)
- Player of the Year: D. J. Carey
- All-Star Team: See here

The 2000 All-Ireland Senior Hurling Championship (also known as the Guinness Hurling Championship for sponsorship reasons) was the 114th staging of the All-Ireland Senior Hurling Championship, the Gaelic Athletic Association's premier inter-county hurling tournament. The draw for the 2000 fixtures took place on 14 November 1999. The championship began on 6 May 2000 and ended on 10 September 2000.

Cork were the defending champions but were defeated by Offaly in the All-Ireland semi-final. Carlow, New York and Westmeath fielded teams after long absences.

On 10 September 2000, Kilkenny won the championship following a 5–15 to 1–14 defeat of Offaly in the All-Ireland final. This was their 26th All-Ireland title, their first in seven championship seasons. It was the third All-Ireland final to feature teams from the same province.

Offaly's Johnny Dooley was the championship's top scorer with 0–41. Kilkenny's D. J. Carey was the unanimous choice for Hurler of the Year.

== New provincial formats ==
Following a motion from the Westmeath County Board at Congress, the Leinster Council proposed the introduction of a "back door system" in their hurling championship. This would be introduced to help develop hurling in the "weaker" counties and to ensure at least two championship games for these teams. While the motion was passed at Congress in April, the new format was rejected by the GAA's management committee at a meeting on 30 October 1999. The committee disagreed with the prospect of allowing losers from earlier rounds to re-enter the championship through a "back door system". As a result of this the Leinster Council were forced to tweak their championship format. This also led to the postponement of the championship draw. The Leinster Council's diluted proposal saw the introduction of a round-robin for the four weakest teams in the province. The group stage winners would join the other three teams in the championship proper.

== Team changes ==
=== To Championship ===
Promoted from the All-Ireland Intermediate Hurling Championship

- Carlow
- Westmeath

Re entered Championship

- New York

=== From Championship ===
Regraded to the All-Ireland Intermediate Hurling Championship

- Roscommon

== Teams ==
Due to the introduction of the round robin system in Leinster, Carlow and Westmeath returned to the championship.

On 18 May 2000 the Roscommon County Board announced that the senior hurling team were withdrawing from the Connacht Championship. Nine of the previous year's panel were absent and, together with a lack of commitment from the remaining players, the board were left with no choice but to withdraw. As a result of this the Connacht Championship was not played and Galway's first game was an All-Ireland quarter-final.

The Kerry County Board were faced with a similar prospect to Roscommon, however, they declined to withdraw from the Munster Championship.

New York joined the Ulster Championship.

=== General information ===
Nineteen counties competed in the All-Ireland Senior Hurling Championship: one team in the Connacht Senior Hurling Championship, seven teams in the Leinster Senior Hurling Championship, six teams in the Munster Senior Hurling Championship and five teams in the Ulster Senior Hurling Championship.

| County | Last provincial title | Last championship title | Position in 1999 Championship |
|---|---|---|---|
| Antrim | 1999 | — | |
| Carlow | — | — | |
| Clare | 1998 | 1997 | |
| Cork | 1999 | 1999 | |
| Derry | 1908 | — | |
| Down | 1997 | — | |
| Dublin | 1961 | 1938 | |
| Galway | 1999 | 1988 | |
| Kerry | 1891 | 1891 | |
| Kilkenny | 1999 | 1993 | |
| Laois | 1949 | 1915 | |
| Limerick | 1996 | 1973 | |
| London | — | 1901 | |
| New York | — | — | |
| Offaly | 1995 | 1998 | |
| Tipperary | 1993 | 1991 | |
| Waterford | 1963 | 1959 | |
| Westmeath | — | — | |
| Wexford | 1997 | 1996 | |

=== Personnel and kits ===
| Team | Manager | Captain | Sponsor | Kit manufacturer |
|---|---|---|---|---|
| Antrim | Seán McNaughton | Conor McCambridge | Bushmills | O'Neills |
| Carlow | Eddie Byrne | | Stone Developments | O'Neills |
| Clare | Ger Loughnane | Brian Lohan | Eircell | O'Neills |
| Cork | Jimmy Barry-Murphy | Fergal Ryan | Esat Digifone | O'Neills |
| Derry | Kevin McNaughton | Conor Murray | O'Kane Insurance | O'Neills |
| Down | Jimmy O'Reilly | | Canal Court Hotel | O'Neills |
| Dublin | Michael O'Grady | | Arnott's | O'Neills |
| Galway | Mattie Murphy | Joe Rabbitte | Supermac's | O'Neills |
| Kerry | Michael O'Halloran | | Kerry Group | O'Neills |
| Kilkenny | Brian Cody | Willie O'Connor | Avonmore | O'Neills |
| Laois | Padraig Horan | P. J. Peacock | Meadow Meats | O'Neills |
| Limerick | Éamonn Cregan | Ollie Moran | Red Cow Moran's Hotel | O'Neills |
| London | | | Setanta Sports | O'Neills |
| New York | | | Budweiser | O'Neills |
| Offaly | Pat Fleury | Johnny Dooley | Carroll Meats | O'Neills |
| Tipperary | Nicky English | Tommy Dunne | Finches | O'Neills |
| Waterford | Gerald McCarthy | Paul Flynn | Gain Feeds | O'Neills |
| Wexford | Joachim Kelly | Rory McCarthy | Wexford Creamery | O'Neills |

== Ulster Senior Hurling Championship ==
Quarter-finals
Derry | 3–14
New York | 1–10

Semi-finals
Derry | 2–15
Down | 0–08
Antrim | 2–23
London | 0–12

Final
Derry | 4–08
Antrim | 0–19

| 3 June 2000 Quarter-final | Derry | 3–14 – 1–10 | New York | Casement Park |
| | P Branniff 0–6, N Sands, G Savage 1–1 each, B Branniff 0–4, G McGrattan 1–0, P Monan, G Gordan 0–1 each. | | K Kennedy 1–1, O Cummins 0–3, D Ryan, T Simms, B McCabe 0–2 each. | Referee: E Morris (Dublin) |

| 11 June 2000 Semi-final | Derry | 2–15 – 0–8 | Down | Casement Park |
| | G Biggs 0–10, M Collins 1–2, J O'Dwyer 0–3, K McKeever 1–0. | Report | J McGrattan 0–3, P Braniff, G McGrattan, G Savage, G Gordan, D Byers 0–1 each. | Referee: P Aherne (Carlow) |

| 11 June 2000 Semi-final | Antrim | 2–23 – 0–12 | London | Casement Park |
| | G O'Kane 1–9, C McCambridge 1–4, A Delargey 0–3, C Hamill 0–3, C Cunning 0–2, M Molloy, R Donnelly 0–1 each. | Report | T Moloney 0–6, D Browne, M O'Meara, T Lohan, D Deane 0–1 each, F Horgan 0–2. | Referee: B Kelly (Westmeath) |

| 9 July 2000 Final | Derry | 4–8 – 0–19 | Antrim | Casement Park |
| | G Biggs 1–3 (2f), O Collins 1–2 (2f), J O'Dwyer 1–1, K McKeever 1–0, K McCloy and G Biggs 0–1 each. | Report | C McCambridge. 0–6, (3 '65, 1f), Gregory O'Kane 0–4 (3f), A Elliott 0–3, C Hamill 0–3 (1 sideline), C Cunning, J Connolly, A Delargy 0–1 each. | Referee: J McDonnell (Tipperary) |

== Munster Senior Hurling Championship ==
Quarter-finals
Kerry | 0–04
Cork | 2–32
Tipperary | 0–17
Waterford | 0–14

Semi-finals
Cork | 2–17
Limerick | 1–11
Tipperary | 2–19
Clare | 1–14

Final
Cork | 0–23
Tipperary | 3–12

| 27 May 2000 Quarter-final | Kerry | 0–4 – 2–32 | Cork | Fitzgerald Stadium |
| | P Cronin, O Diggins, C Walsh (f), M Slattery (f) 0–1 each. | Report | N Ronan 0–8 (1f), T McCarthy 1–3, S McGrath 0–4, J Deane 0–4 (3f), A Browne 1–1, K Murray 0–3, P Ryan, B Coleman, F McCormack, J O'Connor 0–2 each, M O'Connell 0–1 (f). | Referee: B Kelly (Westmeath) |

| 28 May 2000 Quarter-final | Tipperary | 0–17 – 0–14 | Waterford | Páirc Uí Chaoimh |
| | T Dunne 0–5 (5f), J Leahy 0–3, D Ryan, P Shelley, M O'Leary 0–2 each, B O'Meara, P Ryan, P O'Brien 0–1 each. | Report | K McGrath, P Flynn (2f) 0–3 each, P Queally, D Bennett 0–2 each, F Hartley (f), B O'Sullivan, T Browne, D Shanahan 0–1 each. | Referee: D Murphy (Wexford) |

| 4 June 2000 Semi-final | Cork | 2–17 – 1–11 | Limerick | Semple Stadium |
| | J Deane (1–4), S McGrath (1–2), P Ryan (0–3), T McCarthy (0–2), F McCormack (0–2), W Sherlock (0–1), N Ronan (0–1), B O'Connor (0–1), K Murray (0–1). | Report | J Butler (1–1), M Keane (0–3), M O'Brien (0–1), M Foley (0–1), C Carey (0–1), B Begley (0–1), O Moran (0–1), J Moran (0–1), D Hennessy (0–1). | Referee: A Mac Suibhne (Dublin) |

| 11 June 2000 Semi-final | Tipperary | 2–19 – 1–14 | Clare | Páirc Uí Chaoimh |
| | E O'Neill (0–7), D Ryan (1–1), P Shelly (1–0), J Leahy (0–3), B O'Meara (0–3), M O'Leary (0–3), T Dunne (0–1), P O'Brien (0–1). | Report | D Forde (1–1), J O'Connor (0–3), N Gilligan (0–2), S McMahon (0–2), G Quinn (0–1), B Quinn (0–1), A Daly (0–1), E Flannery (0–1), K Ralph (0–1), B Murphy (0–1). | Referee: P O'Connor (Limerick) |

| 2 July 2000 Final | Tipperary | 3–12 – 0–23 | Cork | Semple Stadium |
| | E O'Neill 1–5 (4f), T Dunne 2–0, B O'Meara, E Enright 0–2 each, J Leahy, P Kelly, L Cahill 0–1 each. | Report | J Deane 0–10 (7f), B O'Connor, S McGrath, A Browne 0–3 each, P Ryan 0–2 (1f), D Barrett, K Murray 0–1 each. | Attendance: 54,586; Referee: P Horan (Offaly) |

== Leinster Senior Hurling Championship ==
| Pos | Team | Pld | W | D | L | SF | SA | Diff | Pts | Qualification |
|---|---|---|---|---|---|---|---|---|---|---|
| 1 | Laois | 3 | 2 | 1 | 0 | 5–52 | 3–36 | +22 | 5 | Advance to Knockout Stage |
| 2 | Dublin | 3 | 2 | 1 | 0 | 2–54 | 2–37 | +17 | 5 | Advance to Knockout Stage |
| 3 | Carlow | 3 | 1 | 0 | 2 | 6–33 | 5–43 | −7 | 2 | |
| 4 | Westmeath | 3 | 0 | 0 | 3 | 4–26 | 7–49 | −32 | 0 | |

| 6 May 2000 Round robin | Carlow | 2–12 – 1–16 | Dublin | Dr. Cullen Park |
| | P Coady (0–5), M Ryan (1–1), J Byrne (1–0), J Kavanagh (0–2), R Foley (0–2), D Roberts (0–1), C Jordan (0–1). | Report | T McGrane (0–7), D Daly (1–2), G Glynn (0–3), D Russell (0–1), L O'Donoghue (0–1), M Fitzsimons (0–1), D Sweeney (0–1). | Referee: G Harrington (Cork) |

| 7 May 2000 Round robin | Laois | 3–18 – 2–8 | Westmeath | Cusack Park |
| | F O'Sullivan 1–3, J Young 1–3 (0–2 frees), D Cuddy 0–5 (0–2 frees), N Rigney 1–0 (`65'), D Rooney and J Phelan 0–2 each, P Cuddy, D Dowling and D Conroy 0–1 each. | (report) | A Mitchell 1–4 (0–3 frees and 1–0 penalty), B Kennedy 1–0, O Devine 0–2, J Gavigan 0–1, B Williams 0–1 (free). | Referee: J. McDonnell (Tipperary) |

| 14 May 2000 Round robin | Westmeath | 0–7 – 1–20 | Dublin | Cusack Park |
| | B. Murphy (0–1), V. Bateman (0–1), P. Williams (0–1), A. Mitchell (0–1), O. Devine (0–1), G. Gavin (0–1), J. Gavigan (0–1). | | T. McGrane (1–6), D. Russell (0–3), S. Duignan (0–2), D. Daly (0–2), G. Ennis (0–2), D. Sweeney (0–2), G. Glynn (0–2), S. Martin (0–1). | Referee: S Roche (Tipperary) |

| 17 May 2000 Round robin | Carlow | 1–10 – 2–16 | Laois | Dr. Cullen Park |
| | P. Coady (0–6), C. Jordan (1–1), R. Foley (0–2), M. Ryan (0–1). | | D. Cuddy (1–6), F. O'Sullivan (1–0), D. Rooney (0–3), A. Coffey (0–2), N. Rigney (0–2), J. Phelan (0–2), J. Young (0–1). | Referee: J Guinan (Kilkenny) |

| 23 May 2000 Round robin | Westmeath | 2–11 – 3–11 | Carlow | Cusack Park |
| | B. Kennedy (2–1), B. Williams (0–3), A. Devine (0–2), C. Murtagh (0–2), R. Galvin (0–1), P. Williams (0–1), J. Gavigan (0–1). | | P. Coady (1–5), J. Kavanagh (0–4), J. Byrne (1–0), M. Ryan (1–0), R. Foley (0–2). | Referee: P Neary (Kilkenny) |

| 28 May 2000 Round robin | Dublin | 0–18 – 0–18 | Laois | Nowlan Park |
| | T McGrane 0–8 (7f), D Henry, D Russell, S Duignan, G Ennis 0–2 each, D Sweeney, S Martin 0–1 each. | Report | D Cuddy 0–12 (9f), C Cuddy, F O'Sullivan 0–2 each, D Rooney, J Young 0–1 each. | Referee: S McMahon (Clare) |

Knockout Stage

Quarter-finals
Dublin | 2–15
Laois | 1–14

Semi-finals
Kilkenny | 3–16
Dublin | 0–10
Offaly | 3–15
Wexford | 1–08

Final
Kilkenny | 2–21
Offaly | 1–13

| 5 June 2000 Play-off | Dublin | 2–15 – 1–14 | Laois | O'Connor Park |
| | T McGrane 0–8 (7f), S Martin, S Duignan 1–1 each, D Sweeney 0–2, D Henry, N Butler, G Ennis 0–1 each. | Report | D Cuddy 0–6 (4f), D Conroy 1–0, D Rooney, A Coffey 0–2 each, D Dowling, N Rigney, J Young, F O'Sullivan 0–1 each. | Referee: W Barrett (Tipperary) |

| 18 June 2000 Semi-final | Kilkenny | 3–16 – 0–10 | Dublin | Croke Park |
| | C Carter 1–3, H Shefflin 0–6, 3 frees, E Brennan 1–0, S Grehan 0–2, E Kennedy 0–2, 1 free, 1 `65', P Mullally, B McEvoy, DJ Carey 0–1 each. | Report | T McGrane 0–4, 3 frees, D Russell, S Duignan 0–2 each, M Fitzsimons, S Martin 0–1 each. | Attendance: M Wadding (Waterford) |

| 18 June 2000 Semi-final | Offaly | 3–15 – 1–8 | Wexford | Croke Park |
| | J Dooley 0–9 (6f, 1 `65'), J Errity 1–1, G Hanniffy 1–1, B Murphy 1–0, Joe Dooley 0–2, J Pilkington, J Troy 0–1 each. | (report) | L Murphy 1–2, P Codd 0–4 (2f, 1 `65'), M Jordan and M Storey 0–1 each. | Referee: W Barrett (Tipperary) |

| 9 July 2000 Final | Kilkenny | 2–21 – 1–13 | Offaly | Croke Park |
| | C Carter 1–4, D J Carey 1–3 (2f), H Shefflin 0–6 (4f, 1 '65), S Grehan 0–3, D Byrne 0–2, B McEvoy, J Power, A Comerford 0–1 each. | (report) | Johnny Dooley 0–5 (4f), B Murphy 0–4, Joe Dooley 1–0, G Hanniffy 0–3, M Duignan 0–1. | Attendance: 32,802; Referee: W Barrett (Tipperary) |

== All-Ireland Senior Hurling Championship ==
Quarter-finals
Tipperary | 0–15
Galway | 1–14
Offaly | 2–23
Derry | 2–17

Semi-finals
Kilkenny | 2–19
Galway | 0–17
Cork | 0–15
Offaly | 0–19

Final
Kilkenny | 5–15
Offaly | 1–14

=== All-Ireland quarter-finals ===
| 23 July 2000 Quarter-Final | Tipperary | 0–15 – 1–14 | Galway | Croke Park |
| | J Leahy 0–4 (3f), E O'Neill 0–3 (2f), B O'Meara, M O'Leary 0–2 each, P Shelley, E Enright, P Kelly, E Kelly 0–1 each. | Report | E Cloonan 1–4 (1–1 frees), R Gantley 0–5 (2f, 2'65's), D Canning, A Kerins, O Fahy, J Rabbitte, K Broderick 0–1 each. | Attendance: 43,011; Referee: D Murphy (Wexford) |

| 23 July 2000 Quarter-final | Offaly | 2–23 – 2–17 | Derry | Croke Park |
| | Johnny Dooley 0–12 (4 frees, 2 `65s'), B Murphy 2–1, J Pilkington 0–5, C Gath 0–3, Joe Dooley 0–2. | Report | M Collins 1–4, G McGonigle 1–3 (2 frees), Gary Biggs 0–4 (all frees), R McCloskey, J O'Dwyer 0–2 each, O Collins 0–2 (1 free, 1 pen). | Attendance: 43,011; Referee: M Wadding (Waterford) |

=== All-Ireland semi-finals ===
| 6 August 2000 Semi-final | Offaly | 0–19 – 0–15 | Cork | Croke Park |
| | Johnny Dooley 0–7 (5f), J Pilkington 0–4, G Hanniffy 0–3, Joe Dooley 0–2, G Oakley, J Ryan, M Murphy 0–1 each. | Report | J Deane 0–10 (6f), B O'Connor, P Ryan, D Barrett, A Browne, S McGrath 0–1 each. | Referee: W Barrett (Tipperary) |

| 13 August 2000 Semi-final | Kilkenny | 2–19 – 0–17 | Galway | Croke Park |
| | D Byrne 0–8 (1f, 2 65s), H Shefflin 0–7 (4f), D J Carey 1–2 (1f), A Comerford 1–0, C Carter, J Power 0–1 each. | Report | A Kerins 0–5, E Cloonan 0–5 (3f), R Gantley 0–4 (2f, 2'65's), D Tierney, O Fahy, M Healy 0–1 each. | Referee: P O'Connor (Limerick) |

=== All-Ireland Final ===
| 10 September 2000 Final | Kilkenny | 5–15 – 1–14 | Offaly | Croke Park |
| | H Shefflin (2–2), DJ Carey (1–4), C Carter (1–3), D Byrne (0–4), E Brennan (1–0), J Hoyne (0–1), A Comerford (0–1) | Report | Johnny Dooley (0–8), J Pilkington (1–1), G Hanniffy (0–1), B Murphy (0–1), P Mulhaire (0–1), Joe Dooley (0–1), B Whelehan (0–1) | Attendance: 61,493; Referee: W Barrett (Tipperary) |

== Championship statistics ==
=== Top scorers ===
==== Overall ====
| Rank | Player | County | Tally | Total | Matches | Average |
|---|---|---|---|---|---|---|
| 1 | Johnny Dooley | Offaly | 0–41 | 41 | 5 | 8.20 |
| 2 | Tomás McGrane | Dublin | 1–33 | 36 | 5 | 7.20 |
| 3 | Dave Cuddy | Laois | 1–29 | 32 | 4 | 8.00 |
| 4 | Joe Deane | Cork | 1–28 | 31 | 4 | 7.75 |
| 5 | Henry Shefflin | Kilkenny | 2–21 | 27 | 4 | 6.75 |
| 6 | Charlie Carter | Kilkenny | 3–11 | 20 | 4 | 5.00 |
| 6 | Gary Biggs | Derry | 1–17 | 20 | 3 | 6.66 |
| 8 | Pat Coady | Carlow | 1–16 | 19 | 3 | 6.33 |
| 8 | D.J. Carey | Kilkenny | 3–10 | 19 | 4 | 4.75 |
| 10 | Gregory O'Kane | Antrim | 1–13 | 16 | 2 | 8.00 |

==== Single game ====
| Rank | Player | County | Tally | Total | Opposition |
|---|---|---|---|---|---|
| 1 | Gary O'Kane | Antrim | 1–9 | 12 | London |
| 1 | Dave Cuddy | Laois | 0–12 | 12 | Dublin |
| 1 | Johnny Dooley | Offaly | 0–12 | 12 | Derry |
| 4 | Gary Biggs | Derry | 0–10 | 10 | Down |
| 4 | Joe Deane | Cork | 0–10 | 10 | Tipperary |
| 4 | Joe Deane | Cork | 0–10 | 10 | Offaly |
| 7 | Tomás McGrane | Dublin | 1–6 | 9 | Westmeath |
| 7 | Dave Cuddy | Laois | 1–6 | 9 | Carlow |
| 7 | Johnny Dooley | Offaly | 0–9 | 9 | Wexford |
| 10 | Henry Shefflin | Kilkenny | 2–2 | 8 | Offaly |
| 10 | Eugene O'Neill | Tipperary | 1–5 | 8 | Cork |
| 10 | Pat Coady | Carlow | 1–5 | 8 | Westmeath |
| 10 | Johnny Dooley | Offaly | 0–8 | 8 | Kilkenny |
| 10 | Denis Byrne | Kilkenny | 0–8 | 8 | Galway |
| 10 | Tomás McGrane | Dublin | 0–8 | 8 | Laois |
| 10 | Tomás McGrane | Dublin | 0–8 | 8 | Laois |
| 10 | Neil Ronan | Cork | 0–8 | 8 | Kerry |

=== Clean sheets ===
| Rank | Goalkeeper | County | Clean sheets |
|---|---|---|---|
| 1 | Kieran Stevenson | Derry | 2 |
| 1 | Donal Óg Cusack | Cork | 2 |
| 1 | Brendan Cummins | Tipperary | 2 |
| 1 | Brendan McLoughlin | Dublin | 2 |
| 1 | James McGarry | Kilkenny | 2 |
| 6 | Shane Elliott | Antrim | 1 |
| 6 | Brendan Landers | Waterford | 1 |
| 6 | John Lyons | Laois | 1 |
| 6 | Michael Crimmins | Galway | 1 |
| 6 | Stephen Byrne | Offaly | 1 |
