= Alan Browne =

Irish hurler (born 1974)

Personal information
- Native name: Alain de Brún (Irish)
- Born: 23 January 1974 (age 52) Blackrock, Cork, Ireland
- Occupation: Auctioneer
- Height: 6 ft 0 in (183 cm)

Sport
- Sport: Hurling
- Position: Left corner-forward
Club*
Years	Club	Apps (scores)
1992–2011	Blackrock	71 (33-219)
Club titles
- Cork titles: 3
Inter-county**
Years	County	Apps (scores)
1994–2003	Cork	22 (9-17)
Inter-county titles
- Munster titles: 3
- All-Irelands: 1
- NHL: 1
- All Stars: 0
- * club appearances and scores correct as of 20:06, 31 January 2019. **Inter County team apps and scores correct as of 20:06, 31 January 2019.

Alan Browne (born 23 January 1974) is an Irish retired hurler who played for Cork Senior Championship club Blackrock. He played for the Cork senior hurling team for 9 years, during which time he usually lined out as a forward.

Browne began his hurling career at club level with Blackrock. He was selected for the club's top adult team, straight out of the minor grade, ahead of the 1992 championship. One of the most prolific scorers of his era, Browne made 71 championship appearances for the club before his retirement in 2011. He was part of the Blackrock teams that won the Cork Senior Championship in 1999, 2001 and 2002.

At inter-county level, Browne was a member of the Cork under-21 team that won the Munster Championship in 1993. He joined the Cork senior team in 1994. From his debut, Browne was ever-present as an inside forward and made a total of 74 National League and Championship appearances in a career that ended with his last game in the 2003 All-Ireland final. During that time, he was part of the All-Ireland Championship-winning team in 1999. Browne also won three Munster Championship medals, including one as captain, and a National Hurling League medal. He retired from inter-county hurling after Cork's defeat in the 2003 All-Ireland final.

At inter-provincial level, Browne was selected to play in three championship campaigns with Munster and won Railway Cup medals in 1996, 2000 and 2001. As a coach, he served as a selector and joint-manager with the Blackrock senior team, while he was also a selector with the Cork under-21 team.

== Early life ==
Browne was born in Cork and raised in the suburb of Blackrock to the east of the city. His eldest brother, Richard, won an All-Ireland Championship medal with Cork in 1986, while his younger brother, John, won All-Ireland Championship medals with Cork in 1999 and 2004.

== Playing career ==
=== Blackrock ===
Browne joined the Blackrock club at a young age and played in all grades at juvenile and underage levels, however, he enjoyed little in terms of success. He made his senior championship debut in a 0-14 apiece draw with Valley Rovers on 12 July 1992.

On 1 November 1998, Browne lined out at full-forward in his first Cork Senior Championship final. He scored 1-01, however, Blackrock were defeated by reigning champions Imokilly.

Browne lined out at full-forward in a second successive Cork Championship final on 31 October 1999. He scored 2-02, including a point from a free, in Blackrock's 3-17 to 0-08 defeat of University College Cork.

After surrendering their title in 2000, Browne lined out in a third Cork Championship final on 6 October 2001. Imokilly provided the opposition, however, Browne gave a man of the match performance in the 4-08 to 2-07 victory. His tally of 3-08 remains a modern scoring record for an individual player in a final. On 2 December, Browne scored four points in Blackrock's 2-14 to 0-12 defeat by Ballygunner in the Munster Championship final.

On 15 September 2002, Browne scored 1-04 in Blackrock's 1-14 to 0-12 defeat of Newtownshandrum in the Cork Championship final. It was his third and final winners' medal.

Blackrock qualified for a fifth Cork Championship final in six years on 12 October 2003. Newtownshandrum provided the opposition for the second year in succession, however, Browne was held scoreless in the 0-17 to 1-09 defeat.

=== Cork ===
==== Under-21 ====
Browne failed to make the Cork minor hurling team but came to prominence with the Cork under-21 side. He made his first appearance at left wing-forward on 24 June 1993 in a 4-10 to 2-14 defeat of Tipperary in the Munster Championship. On 23 July, he won a Munster Championship medal after Cork's 1-19 to 3-09 defeat of Limerick in the final. Browne played with the under-21 team for a further two years without success.

==== Senior ====
Browne was just eighteen-years-old when he made his first appearance for the Cork senior team on 9 October 1994. He scored a point on his debut in the 0-18 to 1-08 defeat of Limerick in the opening round of the National Hurling League. Browne was later selected at full-forward for Cork's 1-22 to 0-12 Munster Championship defeat of Kerry on 20 May 1995.

On 17 May 1998, Browne scored a goal from full-forward when Cork won the National League title following a 2-14 to 0-13 defeat of Waterford in the final at Semple Stadium.

In 1999 Browne was dropped from the starting fifteen but remained on the panel. On 4 July, he won his first Munster Championship medal after being introduced as a substitute in Cork's 1-15 to 0-14 defeat of reigning champions Clare in the final. On 11 September, Browne started on the bench for the All-Ireland final but was once again introduced as a substitute and scored a point in Cork's 0-12 to 0-11 defeat of Kilkenny.

Browne started the 2000 Munster Championship on the bench, however, he came on as a substitute in Cork's first two games. On 3 July 2000, he was at left wing-forward for Cork's 0-23 to 3-12 defeat of Tipperary in the Munster final.

On 29 November 2002, Browne and six of his teammates from the Cork hurling panel held a press conference at the Imperial Hotel to announce that all 30 members of the panel were withdrawing their services from the county in the hope of better treatment from the county board. He remained a high-profile representative at the negotiations over the following two weeks and was one of five players' representatives who agreed to a settlement with the county board on 13 December.

Browne was appointed captain of the Cork senior team for the 2003 season. On 29 June, he scored 1-01 in Cork's 3-16 to 3-12 defeat of Waterford in the Munster final. It was his third Munster Championship medal while he also had the honour of lifting the cup. On 14 September, he again captained the team from left corner-forward in Cork's 1-14 to 1-11 All-Ireland final defeat by Kilkenny. Browne, who was marked by Michael Kavanagh, was held scoreless.

=== Inter-provincial ===
Browne also lined out with Munster in the inter-provincial hurling championship where he played alongside his championship rivals from Tipperary, Limerick, Clare and Waterford. He first played for his province in 1996. Browne collected his first Railway Cup winners' medal that year, albeit as a non-playing substitute, as Munster trounced Leinster by sixteen points. Four years later in 2000 he was a full member of the team. That year he won a second Railway Cup title, his first on the field of play, as Leinster were beaten once again. A third winners' medal quickly followed in 2001 as Connacht were accounted for.

== Career statistics ==
=== Club ===
Team	Season	Cork		Munster		All-Ireland		Total	
Team	Season	Apps	Score	Apps	Score	Apps	Score	Apps	Score
Blackrock	1992-93	4	0-03	—		—		4	0-03
Blackrock	1993-94	2	0-05	—		—		2	0-05
Blackrock	1994-95	2	3-12	—		—		2	3-12
Blackrock	1995-96	2	2-01	—		—		2	2-01
Blackrock	1996-97	1	0-00	—		—		1	0-00
Blackrock	1997-98	4	2-10	—		—		4	2-10
Blackrock	1998-99	4	2-14	2	2-07	—		6	4-21
Blackrock	1999-00	5	3-16	1	0-05	—		6	3-21
Blackrock	2000-01	2	1-17	—		—		2	1-17
Blackrock	2001-02	5	5-25	3	2-21	—		8	7-46
Blackrock	2002-03	5	4-18	2	0-03	—		7	4-21
Blackrock	2003-04	4	3-05	—		—		4	3-05
Blackrock	2004-05	6	2-18	—		—		6	2-18
Blackrock	2005-06	4	1-15	—		—		4	1-15
Blackrock	2006-07	3	0-03	—		—		3	0-03
Blackrock	2007-08	3	1-08	—		—		3	1-08
Blackrock	2008-09	4	0-11	—		—		4	0-11
Blackrock	2009-10	1	0-01	—		—		1	0-01
Blackrock	2010-11	2	0-01	—		—		2	0-01
Blackrock	2011-12	0	0-00	—		—		0	0-00
Career total		63	29-183	8	4-36	—		71	33-219

=== Inter-county ===
Team	Year	National League			Munster		All-Ireland		Total	
Team	Year	Division	Apps	Score	Apps	Score	Apps	Score	Apps	Score
Cork	1994-95	Division 1	8	5-03	2	2-03	—		10	7-06
Cork	1995-96	Division 1	7	4-03	1	1-01	—		8	5-04
Cork	1997	Division 2	7	4-10	1	0-02	—		8	4-12
Cork	1998	Division 1B	7	4-04	2	1-01	—		9	5-05
Cork	1999	Division 1B	3	1-02	2	0-00	2	0-02	7	1-04
Cork	2000	Division 1B	3	0-08	3	1-04	1	0-01	7	1-13
Cork	2001	Division 1B	5	3-05	1	1-02	—		6	4-07
Cork	2002	Division 1B	4	0-16	0	0-00	2	1-00	6	1-16
Cork	2003	Division 1B	8	7-08	2	1-01	3	1-02	13	9-11
Career total			52	28-59	14	7-14	8	2-05	74	37-78

== Honours ==
Blackrock

- Cork Senior Hurling Championship (3): 1999, 2001, 2002

Cork

- All-Ireland Senior Hurling Championship (1): 1999
- Munster Senior Hurling Championship (3): 1999, 2000, 2003 (c)
- National Hurling League (1): 1998
- Munster Under-21 Hurling Championship (1): 1994

Munster

- Railway Cup (3): 1996, 2000, 2001

Sporting positions
Preceded by Wayne Sherlock	Cork Senior Hurling Captain; 2003	Succeeded by Ben O'Connor
