= 1999 All-Ireland Senior Hurling Championship =

Championship details
- Dates: 22 May – 12 September 1999
- Teams: 17

All-Ireland champions
- Winning team: Cork (28th win)
- Captain: Mark Landers
- Manager: Jimmy Barry-Murphy

All-Ireland Finalists
- Losing team: Kilkenny
- Captain: Denis Byrne
- Manager: Brian Cody

Provincial champions
- Munster: Cork
- Leinster: Kilkenny
- Ulster: Antrim
- Connacht: Not Played

Championship statistics
- No. matches played: 20
- Goals total: 70 (3.5 per game)
- Points total: 599 (29.95 per game)
- Top Scorer: Joe Deane (1–24); Henry Shefflin (1–24)
- Player of the Year: Brian Corcoran
- All-Star Team: See here

The 1999 All-Ireland Senior Hurling Championship was the 113th staging of the All-Ireland Senior Hurling Championship, the Gaelic Athletic Association's premier inter-county hurling tournament. The draw for the provincial fixtures took place on 15 November 1998. The championship ran from 22 May to 12 September 1999.

Offaly entered the championship as the defending champions, however, they were beaten by Cork in the All-Ireland semi-final. Meath, who had participated in the championship since 1993, declined to field a team.

The All-Ireland final was played on 12 September 1999 at Croke Park in Dublin, between Cork and Kilkenny, in what was their 21st championship meeting overall and their first All-Ireland final-meeting in seven years. Cork won the match by 0–13 to 0–12 to claim their 28th championship title overall and a first tile in nine years.

Cork's Joe Deane and Kilkenny's Henry Shefflin were the championship's top scorers with 1–24 apiece. Cork's Brian Corcoran was the choice for Hurler of the Year.

== Team changes ==
=== To Championship ===
Promoted from the All-Ireland Intermediate Hurling Championship

- None

=== From Championship ===
Regraded to the All-Ireland Intermediate Hurling Championship

- Meath

== Participating counties ==
| Team | Colours | Sponsor | Manager | Most recent success |
| Team | Colours | Sponsor | Manager | All-Ireland | Provincial | League |
|---|---|---|---|---|---|---|
| Antrim | Saffron and white | Bushmills | Séamus Elliott | | 1998 |
| Clare | Saffron and blue | Patrick Donnellan | Ger Loughnane | 1997 | 1998 | 1977–78 |
| Cork | Red and white | Esat Digifone | Jimmy Barry-Murphy | 1990 | 1992 | 1998 |
| Derry | Red and white | Sperrin Metal | Kevin McNaughton | | 1908 |
| Down | Red and black | Canal Court Hotel | Frank Dawson | | 1997 |
| Dublin | Navy and blue | Arnotts | Michael O'Grady | 1938 | 1961 | 1938–39 |
| Galway | Maroon and white | Supermac's | Mattie Murphy | 1988 | 1998 | 1995–96 |
| Kerry | Green and gold | Kerry Group | P. J. O'Grady | 1891 | 1891 |
| Kilkenny | Black and amber | Avonmore | Brian Cody | 1993 | 1998 | 1995 |
| Laois | Blue and white | Meadow Meats | Padraig Horan | 1915 | 1949 |
| Limerick | Green and white | Drug Free Cúl | Éamonn Cregan | 1973 | 1996 | 1997 |
| London | Green and white | | Mike Hennessy | 1901 |
| Offaly | Green, white and gold | Carroll Meaths | Michael Bond | 1998 | 1995 | 1990–91 |
| Roscommon | Blue and yellow | Casey's Ford | Michael Conneely | | 1913 |
| Tipperary | Blue and gold | Finches | Nicky English | 1991 | 1993 | 1999 |
| Waterford | White and blue | Gain Feeds | Gerald McCarthy | 1959 | 1963 | 1962–63 |
| Wexford | Purple and Gold | Wexford Creamery | Rory Kinsella | 1996 | 1997 | 1972–73 |

== Managerial changes ==
=== Pre-championship ===
| Team | 1999 Manager | 1998 Manager(s) | Reason for leaving | Story/Accomplishments |
|---|---|---|---|---|
| Kilkenny | Brian Cody, All-Ireland minor and senior-winning captain with Kilkenny. | Kevin Fennelly | Resigned | Fennelly guided Kilkenny to the 1998 All-Ireland final, however, the team were beaten by Offaly. |
| Tipperary | Nicky English, two-time All-Ireland winner with Tipperary. | Len Gaynor | Term ended | Gaynor guided Tipperary to the 1997 All-Ireland final, however, the team were beaten by Clare. |

== Provincial championship ==
=== Connacht Senior Hurling Championship ===
==== Final ====
10 July 1999
Final

| Galway | 4–26 – 2–8 | Roscommon |
|---|---|---|
| O. Fahy 1–7 (0–2 frees), A. Kerins, K. Broderick 1–3 each; E. Cloonan 0–4 (0–2 frees), F. Flynn 0–4, O. Canning 1–1, P. Hardiman, J. Cooney, J. Rabbitte, J. Campbell 0–1 each. | (report) | C. Kelly 1–1, B. Boyle 0–4 (0–3 frees), S. Sweeney 1–0, M. Cunniffe 0–2, R. Mulry 0–1. |

Dr. Hyde Park, Roscommon
Referee: J. McDonnell (Tipperary).

=== Leinster Senior Hurling Championship ===
Quarter-finals
Wexford | 1–13
Dublin | 1–12

Semi-finals
Kilkenny | 6–21
Laois | 1–14
Offaly | 3–17
Wexford | 0–15

Final
Kilkenny | 5–14
Offaly | 1–16

==== Quarter-finals ====
30 May 1999
Quarter-final

| Wexford | 1–13 – 1–12 | Dublin |
|---|---|---|
| A Fenlon 0–5; M Jordan 1–1; P Cod, T Dempsey, M Storey 0–2 Each; E Scallon 0–1. | (report) | T McGrane 1–5; D Sweeney 0–2; M Fitzsimons 0–2; C McCann, K Flynn, N Butler 0–1 Each. |

Nowlan Park, Kilkenny
Referee: P. O'Connor (Limerick).

==== Semi-finals ====
20 June 1999
Semi-final

| Kilkenny | 6–21 – 1–14 | Laois |
|---|---|---|
| H. Shefflin (0–10, 0–6 frees); DJ Carey (2–3, 0–1 free, 0–1 '65'); K. O'Shea (2–1); J. Power (1–1); A. Comerford( 1–0); C. Carter (0–3); B. McEvoy (0–2); M. Kavanagh (0–1). | (report) | N. Rigney (1–8, 0–5 frees, 0–1 '65'); F. O'Sullivan (0–2); D. Cuddy, J. Shortall, E. Fennelly and D. Conroy (0–1) each. |

Croke Park, Dublin
Referee: M. Wadding (Waterford).

20 June 1999
Semi-final

| Offaly | 3–17 – 0–15 | Wexford |
|---|---|---|
| Joe Dooley 1–5; Johnny Dooley 0–6 (0–4 frees); J. Troy 1–2 (0–1 free); M. Duignan 1–0; B. Dooley 0–2; D. Oakley and J. Ryan 0–1 each. | (report) | P. Codd 0–8 (0–7 frees); T. Dempsey and R. Quigley 0–2 each; M. Storey, R. McCarthy and A. Fenlon 0–1 each. |

Croke Park, Dublin
Referee: W. Barrett (Tipperary).

==== Final ====
11 July 1999
Final

| Kilkenny | 5–14 – 1–16 | Offaly |
|---|---|---|
| D.J. Carey 2–4 (0–1 free, 0–1 seventy); H. Shefflin 1–6 (0–1 free); C. Carter 1–2; B. McEvoy 1–1; A. Comerford 0–1. | (report) | Johnny Dooley 0–7 (0–4 frees); J. Pilkington 1–2; B. Whelehan 0–3 (0–1 free); J. Troy 0–2; M. Duignan and P. Mulhare 0–1 each. |

Croke Park, Dublin
Attendance: 38,310
Referee: P. O'Connor (Limerick)

=== Munster Senior Hurling Championship ===
Quarter-finals
Tipperary | 4–29
Kerry | 2–06
Waterford | 1–16
Limerick | 1–15

Semi-finals
Clare | 2–12, 1–21
Tipperary | 0–18, 1–11
Cork | 0–24
Waterford | 1–15

Final
Clare | 0–14
Cork | 1–15

==== Quarter-finals ====
22 May 1999
Quarter-final

| Tipperary | 4–29 – 2–6 | Kerry |
|---|---|---|
| P. Shelley 2–2; T. Dunne 0–7 (0–4 frees); J. Leahy 0–6 (0–2 frees); L. Cahill, D. Ryan 1–2 each; P. Kelly 0–4; B. O'Meara 0–3; C. Gleeson 0–2; E. Enright 0–1. | (report) | P. Cronin, B. O'Sullivan 1–0 each; M. Slattery 0–3 (frees); T. Maunsell 0–3. |

Semple Stadium, Thurles
Referee: E. Morris (Dublin).

30 May 1999
Quarter-final

| Waterford | 1–16 – 1–15 | Limerick |
|---|---|---|
| P. Flynn 1–8 (0–4 frees); K. McGrath 0–3; M. White 0–2; D. Bennett, F. Hartley and D. Shanahan 0–1 each. | (report) | G. Kirby 0–4 frees; M. Galligan 0–3 frees; M. Houlihan 1–0; B. Foley and J. Moran 0–2 each; C. Carey, C. Smith, M. Foley and D. Clarke 0–1 each. |

Páirc Uí Chaoimh, Cork
Referee: P. Horan (Offaly).

==== Semi-finals ====
6 June 1999
Semi-final

| Clare | 2–12 – 0–18 | Tipperary |
|---|---|---|
| J. O'Connor 1–2 (0–2 frees); D. Fitzgerald 1–0 penalty; D. Forde 0–3; N. Gilligan 0–2; A. Markham, S. McMahon, C. Lynch, B. Murphy and C. Clancy 0–1 each. | (report) | T. Dunne 0–7 (0–3 frees, 0–2 7 seventies); L. Cahill 0–3; P. Shelley 0–2; J. Leahy, E. Enright, B. O'Meara, E. Tucker, D. Ryan and P. Kelly 0–1 each. |

Páirc Uí Chaoimh, Cork
Referee: D. Murphy (Wexford).

12 June 1999
Semi-final
Replay

| Clare | 1–21 – 1–11 | Tipperary |
|---|---|---|
| A. Markham 1–3; S. McMahon 0–6 (0–5 frees); C. Lynch 0–4; B. Murphy 0–3; D. Forde 0–2 frees; J. O'Connor (free), O. Baker and E. Flannery 0–1 each. | (report) | T. Dunne 0–10 (0–9 from frees); D. Ryan 1–0 free; E. Enright 0–1. |

Páirc Uí Chaoimh, Cork
Referee: D. Murphy (Wexford).

13 June 1999
Semi-final

| Cork | 0–24 – 1–15 | Waterford |
|---|---|---|
| M. O'Connell 0–8 (0–2 frees, 0–1 seventy, 0–1 sideline); J. Deane 0–7 (0–4 frees); T. McCarthy 0–3; M. Landers 0–2; B. Corcoran, B. O'Connor, F. McCormack and K. Murray 0–1 each. | (report) | P. Flynn 1–4 (1–3 frees); K. McGrath 0–4 (0–1 seventy); D. Shanahan 0–3; D. Bennett, M. White, S. Frampton (free) and M. Malumphy (free), 0–1 each. |

Semple Stadium, Thurles
Referee: A. MacSuibhne (Dublin).

==== Final ====
4 July 1999
Final

| Cork | 1–15 – 0–14 | Clare |
|---|---|---|
| J. Deane 1–4 (0–4 frees); M. O’Connell 0–5 (0–2 frees, 0–1 seventy); B. O’Connor and S. McGrath 0–2 each; N. Ronan and F. McCormack 0–1 each. | (report) | N. Gilligan 0–3; D. Forde 0–3 (0–2 frees); O. Baker 0–2; R. O’Hara, S. McMahon (free), A. Markham, B. Murphy, C. Lynch and D. Scanlan 0–1 each. |

Semple Stadium, Thurles
Referee: P. O'Connor (Limerick).

=== Ulster Senior Hurling Championship ===
Semi-Finals
Antrim | 3–23
London | 1–06
Derry | 4–16
Down | 4–08

Final
Antrim | 2–19
Derry | 1–09

==== Semi-finals ====
19 June 1999
Semi-final

| Antrim | 3–23 – 1–6 | London |
|---|---|---|
| Gregory O'Kane 1–9, A. Elliott 2–2, G. O'Kane 0–4, L. Richmond 0–3, C. Cunning 0–2, J. Carson, B. McGarry, P. McMullan 0–1 each. | (report) | F. Horgan 1–1, T. Moloney 0–3, M. O'Meara, D. Hurley 0–1 each. |

Casement Park, Belfast

19 June 1999
Semi-final

| Derry | 4–16 – 4–8 | Down |
|---|---|---|
| G. McGonigle 0–9, C. Murray 2–0, O. Collins 1–2, J. O'Dwyer 1–0, R. McCluskey, M. Collins 0–2, D. Doherty, G. Biggs 0–1 each. | (report) | M. Coulter 1–2, E. Traynor 1–2, D. Coulter 1–0, J. McCrickard 0–3, M. Branniffe 0–1. |

Casement Park, Belfast

==== Final ====
10 July 1999
Final

| Antrim | 2–19 – 1–9 | Derry |
|---|---|---|
| Gregg O’Kane 1–5, S. P. McKillop 1–0, L. Richmond 0–4, A. Elliott 0–3, F. McMullan 0–2, J. Flynn, J. Carson, C. McGuckin, C. Cunning, Gary O’Kane 0–1 each. | (report) | G. McGonigle 1–7, N. Mullan and R. McCluskey 0–1 each. |

Casement Park, Belfast
Referee: G. Devlin (Armagh).

== All-Ireland Senior Hurling Championship ==
Quarter-finals
Clare | 3–15, 3–18
Galway | 2–18, 2–14
Offaly | 4–22
Antrim | 0–12

Semi-finals
Kilkenny | 2–14
Clare | 1–13
Cork | 0–19
Offaly | 0–16

Final
Kilkenny | 0–12
Cork | 0–13

=== All-Ireland quarter-finals ===
25 July 1999
Quarter-final

| Offaly | 4–22 – 0–12 | Antrim |
|---|---|---|
| J. Pilkington (1–5), J. Troy (1–3), B. Dooley(1–2), J. Dooley (0–5, 1 free), B. Whelahan (0–3, 2 frees), J. Ryan (1–0), H. Rigney, G. Hannify, J. Errity, M. Duignan (0–1 each). | (report) | C. Cunning (0–3, 1 free), G. O’Kane (0–2, 2 frees), S. McMullan (0–2, 1 free), C. McGuickan, J. Carson, J. Close, B. McGarry, Gary O’Kane (0–1 each). |

Croke Park, Dublin
Attendance: 34,122
Referee: M. Wadding (Waterford).

25 July 1999
Quarter-final

| Clare | 3–15 – 2–18 | Galway |
|---|---|---|
| A. Markham 1–3 (0–3 from frees); N. Gilligan 1–1; S. McNamara 1–0; S. McMahon 0–7 (0–4 from frees; 0–3 from 65’s); O. Baker 0–2; C. Lynch 0–2. | (report) | O. Fahy 2–2; A. Kerins 0–5; R. Gantley 0–4 (0 4 from frees); E. Cloonan 0–2 (0 2 from frees); J. Rabbitte 0–2; F. Flynn 0–2; O. Canning 0–1. |

Croke Park, Dublin
Attendance: 34,122
Referee: P. Horan (Offaly).

3 August 1999
Quarter-final
Replay

| Clare | 3–18 – 2–14 | Galway |
|---|---|---|
| N. Gilligan 2–3; A. Markham 0–4 (0–3 frees); P.J. O’Connell 1–0; S. McMahon 0–3 (0–2 frees, 0–1 seventy); C. Lynch 0–2; J. O’Connor 0–2 frees; S. McNamara, C. Clancy, B. Murphy and D. Forde 0–1 each. | (report) | E. Cloonan 1–10 (0–10 frees); O. Fahy 1–0; J. Cooney 0–2; R. Gantley and F. Flynn 0–1 each. |

Croke Park, Dublin
Attendance: 32,560
Referee: P. Horan (Offaly).

=== All-Ireland semi-finals ===
9 August 1999
Semi-final

| Cork | 0–19 – 0–16 | Offaly |
|---|---|---|
| J. Deane 0–10 (0–7 frees); F. McCormack, S. McGrath and B. O’Connor 0–2 each; M. O’Connell, A. Browne and K. Murray 0–1 each. | Report | Johnny Dooley 0–5 (0–3 frees); Joe Dooley, J. Pilkington and J. Troy 0–2 each; J. Ryan, P. Mulhaire, M. Duignan, B. Whelehan (free) and B. Dooley 0–1 each. |

Croke Park, Dublin
Attendance: 37,629
Referee: W. Barrett (Tipperary).

15 August 1999
Semi-final

| Kilkenny | 2–14 – 1–13 | Clare |
|---|---|---|
| D.J. Carey 1–3; B. McEvoy 0–4; K. O’Shea 1–0; H. Shefflin 0–3 (0–2 frees); J. Power 0–2; A. Comerford and P. O’Neill (free), 0–1 each. | (report) | J. O’Connor 0–5 (0–4 frees); S. McNamara 1–0; N. Gilligan 0–3; D. Forde, A. Markham, P.J. O’Connell, A. Daly (free) and E. Flannery 0–1 each. |

Croke Park, Dublin
Attendance: 54,151
Referee: D. Murphy (Wexford).

=== All-Ireland final ===
12 September 1999
Final

| Cork | 0–13 – 0–12 | Kilkenny |
|---|---|---|
| J. Deane (0–3), T. McCarthy (0–3), S. McGrath (0–3), M. Landers (0–1), A. Browne (0–1), K. Murray (0–1), B. O'Connor (0–1). | (report) | H. Shefflin (0–5), A. Comerford (0–2), C. Carter (0–2), J. Power (0–1), D. Byrne (0–1), B. McEvoy (0–1). |

Croke Park, Dublin
Attendance: 62,989
Referee: P. O'Connor (Limerick).

== Championship statistics ==
=== Scoring ===
- First goal of the championship: Paul Shelly for Tipperary against Kerry (Munster quarter-final)
- Last goal of the championship: D.J. Carey for Kilkenny against Clare (All-Ireland semi-final)
- Most goals in a match: 8
  - Derry 4–16 : 4–8 Down (Ulster semi-final)
- Most points in a match: 39
  - Cork 0–24 : 1–15 Waterford (Munster semi-final)
- Most goals by one team in a match: 6
  - Kilkenny 6–21 : 1–14 Laois (Leinster semi-final)
- Most goals scored by a losing team: 4
  - Derry 4–16 : 4–8 Down (Ulster semi-final)
- Most points scored by a losing team: 18
  - Clare 3–15 : 2–18 Galway (All-Ireland quarter-final)
- Widest winning margin: 29 points
  - Tipperary 4–29 : 2–6 Kerry (Munster quarter-final)

=== Top scorers ===
Overall

| Rank | Player | County | Tally | Total | Matches | Average |
|---|---|---|---|---|---|---|
| 1 | Joe Deane | Cork | 1–24 | 27 | 4 | 6.75 |
| 1 | Henry Shefflin | Kilkenny | 1–24 | 27 | 4 | 6.75 |
| 3 | D. J. Carey | Kilkenny | 5–10 | 25 | 4 | 6.25 |
| 4 | Tommy Dunne | Tipperary | 0–24 | 24 | 3 | 8.00 |
| 5 | Gregory O'Kane | Antrim | 2–16 | 22 | 3 | 7.33 |
| 6 | Ollie Fahy | Galway | 4–9 | 21 | 3 | 7.00 |
| 6 | Niall Gilligan | Clare | 3–12 | 21 | 4 | 5.25 |
| 8 | Alan Markham | Clare | 2–13 | 19 | 6 | 3.16 |
| 8 | Eugene Cloonan | Galway | 1–16 | 19 | 3 | 6.33 |
| 8 | Geoffrey McGonagle | Derry | 1–16 | 19 | 2 | 9.50 |

Single game

| Rank | Player | County | Tally | Total | Opposition |
|---|---|---|---|---|---|
| 1 | Eugene Cloonan | Galway | 1–10 | 13 | Clare |
| 2 | Gregory O'Kane | Antrim | 1–9 | 12 | London |
| 3 | Paul Flynn | Waterford | 1–8 | 11 | Limerick |
| 3 | Niall Rigney | Laois | 1–8 | 11 | Kilkenny |
| 5 | Tommy Dunne | Tipperary | 0–10 | 10 | Clare |
| 5 | Henry Shefflin | Kilkenny | 0–10 | 10 | Laois |
| 5 | Niall Rigney | Joe Deane | 0–10 | 10 | Offaly |
| 5 | Geoffrey McGonagle | Derry | 1–7 | 10 | Antrim |
| 5 | Ollie Fahy | Galway | 1–7 | 10 | Roscommon |
| 5 | D. J. Carey | Kilkenny | 2–4 | 10 | Offaly |

=== Clean sheets ===
| Rank | Goalkeeper | County | Clean sheets |
|---|---|---|---|
| 1 | Donal Óg Cusack | Cork | 3 |
| 1 | Stephen Byrne | Offaly | 3 |
| 3 | Davy Fitzgerald | Clare | 1 |
| 3 | Stephen Brenner | Waterford | 1 |
| 3 | James McGarry | Kilkenny | 1 |

== Miscellaneous ==
- The All-Ireland final was decided for the first time ever with both sides failing to score a goal.

== See also ==
- 1999 All-Ireland Intermediate Hurling Championship

== Broadcasting ==
The following matches were broadcast live on television in Ireland on RTÉ.

| Round | RTÉ |
|---|---|
| Munster quarter-final | Waterford vs Limerick |
| Leinster semi-final | Offaly vs Wexford |
| Munster semi-final | Clare vs Tipperary (draw); Clare vs Tipperary (replay) |
| Leinster final | Kilkenny vs Offaly |
| Munster final | Cork vs Clare |
| All-Ireland quarter-finals | Offaly vs Antrim; Clare vs Galway (draw) |
| All-Ireland semi-finals | Cork vs Offaly; Kilkenny vs Clare |
| All-Ireland final | Cork vs Kilkenny |
