= 1999 All-Ireland Senior Club Hurling Championship final =

1999 All-Ireland Senior Club Hurling Championship Final
- Event: 1998–99 All-Ireland Senior Club Hurling Championship
| St. Joseph's Doora-Barefield | Rathnure |
| 2-14 | 0-8 |
- Date: 17 March 1999
- Venue: Croke Park, Dublin
- Man of the Match: Lorcan Hassett
- Referee: Pat O'Connor (Limerick)
- Attendance: 40,106

The 1999 All-Ireland Senior Club Hurling Championship final was a hurling match played at Croke Park on 17 March 1999 to determine the winners of the 1998–99 All-Ireland Senior Club Hurling Championship, the 29th season of the All-Ireland Senior Club Hurling Championship, a tournament organised by the Gaelic Athletic Association for the champion clubs of the four provinces of Ireland. The final was contested by St. Joseph's Doora-Barefield of Clare and Rathnure of Wexford, with St. Joseph's Doora-Barefield winning by 2-14 to 0-8.

The All-Ireland final was a unique occasion as it was the first ever championship meeting between St. Joseph's Doora-Barefield and Rathnure. It remains their only clash in the All-Ireland series. Both sides were bidding to make history by winning their first All-Ireland title.

The final was played out in front of a record crowd of 40,106. Paul Codd pointed a free from the middle of the field after two minutes, but over the next five minutes St. Joseph's rattled over three points, courtesy of Joe Considine, Andrew Whelan and Loran Hassett. Codd, with a `65', offered a Rathnure reply. Again, it was a short-lived respite as St. Joseph's contrived a goal from the puck-out. Christy O'Connor drove it long and Hassett gathered to place Whelan, who shot to the net. Paul Codd (free) and Brendan O'Leary brought the gap back to two points but in the last ten minutes before the break, St. Joseph's replied with points from Hassett, Jamesie O'Connor, Seánie McMahon and Ciarán O'Neill to leave it 1-7 to 0-4 at half-time.

St. Joseph's second-half scores came in similar waves. O'Connor (two frees), Hassett (two play) extended it to 1-11 to 0-5 by the 38th minute. The final score of the game came in the 61st minute, a Hassett goal. Ollie Baker sent a sideline cut across the goal and it fell to Hassett who finished expertly.

St. Joseph's Doora-Barefield's victory secured their first All-Ireland title. They became the 20th club to win the All-Ireland title, while they were the second Clare representatives to claim the ultimate prize.

Rathnure's All-Ireland final defeat was their fifth in a losing streak that stretches back to 1972.

== Match ==
=== Details ===
17 March 1999

| St. Joseph's Doora-Barefield | 2-14 - 0-8 | Rathnure |
|---|---|---|
| L Hassett 1-5, A Whelan 1-2, J O'Connor 0-4 (3f), S McMahon 0-1 (f), C O'Neill 0-1, J Considine 0-1. | Report | P Codd 0-6 (4f, 1 65), B O'Leary 0-1, A Codd 0-1. |

Croke Park, Dublin
Attendance: 40,106
Referee: P O'Connor (Limerick)

| St. Joseph's | Rathnure |
