= 2001 Railway Cup Hurling Championship =

Irish hurling competition

2001 Railway Cup
- Date: 10 November 2001 - 11 November 2001
- Teams: Connacht; Leinster; Munster; Ulster
- Champions: Munster (43rd title); Brendan Cummins (captain)
- Runners-up: Connacht

Tournament statistics
- Matches played: 3
- Goals scored: 12 (4 per match)
- Points scored: 93 (31 per match)
- Top scorer(s): Alan Browne (2-13)

The 2001 Railway Cup Hurling Championship was the 74th series of the inter-provincial hurling Railway Cup. Three matches were played between 10 November 2001 and 11 November 2001 to decide the title. It was contested by Connacht, Leinster, Munster and Ulster.

Munster entered the championship as the defending champions.

On 11 November 2001, Munster won the Railway Cup after a 1–21 to 1–15 defeat of Connacht in the final at MacDonagh Park, Nenagh. It was their 43rd Railway Cup title overall and their second title in succession.

Munster's Alan Browne was the Railway Cup top scorer with 2–13.

== Results ==
10 November 2001 Semi-final	Connacht	4-16 - 1-09	Ulster	Semple Stadium, Thurles
	K Broderick 2-1, O Fahy 2-1, F Healy 0-6, D Coen 0-3, D O'Brien 0-1, R Murray 0-1, L Hodgins 0-1, F Forde 0-1.		P Richmond 1-3, P Branniff 0-3, C McCambridge 0-2, C Cunning 0-1.	Attendance: 50

10 November 2001 Semi-final	Munster	2-20 - 3-12	Leinster	MacDonagh Park, Nenagh
	A Browne 1-5, K McGrath 0-5, S McGrath 1-1, D Forde 0-3, C Carey 0-2, E Kelly 0-2, O Moran 0-1, P Queally 0-1.		C Carter 1-3, H Shefflin 1-2, K Flynn 1-0, B Murphy 0-2, M Jordan 0-1, S Grehan 0-1, N Horan 0-1, D Hyland 0-1, E Brennan 0-1.	Attendance: 180

Final

11 November 2001 Final	Munster	1-21 - 1-15	Connacht	MacDonagh Park, Nenagh
	A Browne 1-8, K McGrath 0-6, E Kelly 0-2, G McGrath, D Forde, C Carey, P Kelly, B O'Meara 0-1 each.	Report	D Coen 0-8, F Healy 1-1, K Broderick 0-2, M Kearns, O Fahy, J Culkin, A Kearns 0-1 each.	Attendance: 250; Referee: P Dunphy (Leinster)

== Top scorers ==
Overall

Rank	Player	County	Tally	Total	Matches	Average
1	Alan Browne	Munster	2-13	19	2	9.50
2	Ken McGrath	Munster	0-11	11	2	5.50
2	Des Coen	Connacht	0-11	11	2	5.50

Single game

Rank	Player	County	Tally	Total	Opposition
1	Alan Browne	Munster	1-08	11	Connacht
2	Alan Browne	Munster	1-05	8	Leinster
2	Des Coen	Connacht	0-08	8	Munster
3	Kevin Broderick	Connacht	2-01	7	Ulster

== Sources ==
- Donegan, Des, The Complete Handbook of Gaelic Games (DBA Publications Limited, 2005).
