= Brendan O'Leary (disambiguation) =

Brendan O'Leary may refer to:

- Brendan O'Leary (born 1958), Irish political scientist
- Brendan O'Leary (hurler), Irish hurler
- Brendan O'Leary-Orange (born 1996), Canadian football player
