= 1988–89 National Hurling League =

58th season of the National Hurling League

League details
- Dates: 30 October 1988 – 30 April 1989

League champions
- Winners: Galway (5th win)
- Captain: Conor Hayes
- Manager: Cyril Farrell

League runners-up
- Runners-up: Tipperary
- Captain: Pat McGrath
- Manager: Michael "Babs" Keating

The 1988–89 National Hurling League, known for sponsorship reasons as the Royal Liver National Hurling League, was the 58th season of the National Hurling League (NHL), an annual hurling competition for the GAA county teams. It was won by Galway. This season was notable as the first to hold both semi-finals and the final at Croke Park, giving the League additional prestige.

== Division 1 ==
National Hurling League Division 1
- Season: 1988-89
- Champions: Galway; 5th National League title Captain: Conor Hayes; Manager: Cyril Farrell
- Relegated: Offaly; Waterford
- Matches played: 35
- Top goalscorer: Adrian Ronan (2-47)

Tipperary came into the season as defending champions of the 1987-88 season. Antrim and Offaly entered Division 1 as the two promoted teams.

On 30 April 1989, Galway won the title after a 2-16 to 4-8 win over Tipperary. It was their first league title since 1987 and their fifth National League title overall.

Waterford were the first team to be relegated after losing all of but one of their group stage games, while Offaly suffered the same fate after losing a series of play-off games with Antrim and Wexford.

=== Table ===
Pos	Team	Pld	W	D	L	Pts	Notes
1	Galway (C)	7	7	0	0	14	National Hurling League champions
2	Tipperary	7	5	1	1	11	National Hurling League runners-up
3	Kilkenny	7	4	1	2	9	
4	Limerick	7	4	0	3	8	
5	Wexford	7	2	0	5	4	
6	Antrim	7	2	0	5	4	
7	Offaly (R)	7	2	0	5	4	Relegated to Division 2
8	Waterford (R)	7	1	0	6	0	Relegated to Division 2

=== Group stage ===
30 October 1988	Offaly	0-11 - 2-12	Galway	St. Brendan's Park, Birr
	M Corrigan 0-6, J Errity 0-2, J Dooley 0-1, P Corrigan 0-1, D Owens 0-1.		G Burke 2-3, J Cooney 0-3, M Naughton 0-3, M McGrath 0-2, R Dwane 0-1.	Referee: W Barrett (Tipperary)

30 October 1988	Antrim	2-15 - 0-11	Wexford	Loughguile
	D McNaughton 1-7, M Sullivan 1-2, B Donnelly 0-2, C Barr 0-1, P McKillen 0-1, J McNaughton 0-1.		M Fitzhenry 0-3, B Byrne 0-2, M Storey 0-2, L McDonnell 0-2, D Prendergast 0-1, B O'Connor 0-1.	Referee: P Delaney (Laois)

30 October 1988	Waterford	0-11 - 1-12	Tipperary	Fraher Field, Dungarvan
	K Delahunty 0-6,		P Fox 1-0, P McGrath 0-3, D Ryan 0-2, D Fogarty 0-1.

30 October 1988	Limerick	3-6 - 0-14	Kilkenny	Gaelic Grounds, Limerick
	G Kirby 2-6,

6 November 1988	Kilkenny	1-15 - 0-13	Antrim	Nowlan Park, Kilkenny
	A Ronan 0-5, L Fennelly 1-1, K Brennan 0-4, J Hennessy 0-4, C Heffernan 0-1.		D McNaughton 0-6, P McKillen 0-2, D Donnelly 0-2, O McFetridge 0-1, L McKeegan 0-1, C Barr 0-1.	Referee: G Long (Tipperary)

6 November 1988	Galway	2-7 - 0-11	Waterford	Kenny Park, Athenry
	E Ryan 1-3, G Burke 1-0, M Connolly 0-3, M Kenny 0-1.		E Rockett 0-2, S Aherne 0-2, K Delahunty 0-2, P Murphy 0-1, B O'Sullivan 0-1, B Prendergast 0-1, G Connors 0-1, D Byrne 0-1.	Referee: M Quinn (Clare)

6 November 1988	Tipperary	1-19 - 0-10	Offaly	Semple Stadium, Thurles
	D Fogarty 0-4, P McGrath 0-4, J Leahy 0-4, M CLeary 1-0, J Cormack 0-2, J Kennedy 0-1, D Carr 0-1, D Ryan 0-1, Cormac Bonnar 0-1, M McGrath 0-1.		M Corrigan 0-6, P Corrigan 0-2, D Fogarty 0-1, D Owens 0-1.	Referee: W Horgan (Cork)

6 November 1988	Wexford	1-7 - 3-12	Limerick	Wexford Park, Wexford
	M Storey 1-0, B O'Connor 0-2, R Coleman 0-1, J O'Connor 0-1, T Dunne 0-1, S Fitzhenry 0-1, M Fitzhenry 0-1.		S Fitzgibbon 3-0, G Kirby 0-5, B Flynn 0-2, M Reale 0-1, D Marron 0-1, J Carroll 0-1, D Punch 0-1, D Fitzgerald 0-1.	Referee: J Moore (Waterford)

13 November 1988	Tipperary	2-20 - 1-4	Wexford	Semple Stadium, Thurles
	P McGrath 0-10, M CLeary 1-1, D Fogarty 0-4, A Ryan 1-0, N English 0-3, J Leahy 0-1, J Hayes 0-1.		M Fitzhenry 1-0, J O'Connor 0-2, S Fitzhenry 0-1, T Dunne 0-1.	Referee: JJ Landers (Waterford)

13 November 1988	Offaly	2-18 - 1-15	Limerick	St. Brendan's Park, Birr
	P Corrigan 2-4, M Corrigan 0-7, D Owens 0-2, J Kelly 0-1, J Errity 0-1, D Pilkington 0-1, K Dooley 0-1.		S Fitzgibbon 1-2, B Finn 0-4, D Fitzgerald 0-3, L O'Connor 0-3, J Carroll 0-1, G Hegarty 0-1, M Nelligan 0-1.	Referee: J Denton (Wexford)

13 November 1988	Waterford	3-14 - 2-10	Antrim	Walsh Park, Waterford
	S Ahearne 1-3, E Rockett 1-1, K Delahunty 0-4, P Murphy 1-0, B O'Sullivan 0-3, D Byrne 0-1, B Prendergast 0-1, G Connors 0-1.		D McNaughton 1-4, D Donnelly 1-0, P McKillen 0-2, D Armstrong 0-1, J McNaughton 0-1, O McFetridge 0-1, C Barr 0-1.	Referee: W Barrett (Tipperary)

13 November 1988	Galway	2-14 - 1-11	Kilkenny	Pearse Stadium, Salthill
	J Cooney 2-1, E Ryan 0-3, M McGrath 0-3, M Naughton 0-3, T Keady 0-2, G Burke 0-2.		A Ronan 0-7, M Phelan 1-0, C Heffernan 0-2, K Brennan 0-1.	Referee: G Kirwan (Offaly)

27 November 1988	Limerick	3-11 - 4-14	Tipperary	Gaelic Grounds, Limerick
	L Garvey 2-1, M Galligan 0-6, S Fitzgibbon 1-1, M Nelligan 0-2, D Fitzgerald 0-1.		P McGrath 1-7, C Bonnar 2-1, P Fox 1-0, J Leahy 0-2, D Ryan 0-2, D Fogarty 0-1, N English 0-1.

27 November 1988	Wexford	0-12 - 0-11	Offaly	St. Patrick's Park, Enniscorthy
	M Storey 0-4, T Dunne 0-2, M Fitzhenry 0-2, S Fitzhenry 0-2, T Walsh 0-1, M Morrissey 0-1.		M Corrigan 0-6, D Owens 0-1, J Errity 0-1, J Kelly 0-1, D Pilkington 0-1, P O'Connor 0-1.	Referee: G Ryan (Tipperary)

27 November 1988	Kilkenny	2-15 - 0-9	Waterford	Nowlan Park, Kilkenny
	A Ronan 1-6, L Fennelly 1-1, R Power 0-2, C Heffernan 0-2, A Prendergast 0-2, G Fennelly 0-1, T McCluskey 0-1.		K Delahunty 0-6, K Ryan 0-1, B O'Sullivan 0-1, G Connors 0-1.	Referee: G Ryan (Tipperary)

27 November 1988	Antrim	2-9 - 3-12	Galway	Casement Park, Belfast
	C Barr 2-1, D McNaughton 0-3, O McFetridge 0-2, JP McKillop 0-1, P McKillen 0-1, J McNaughton 0-1.		G Burke 2-1, E Ryan 1-0, J Cooney 0-3, M McGrath 0-2, M Coleman 0-2, T Kilkenny 0-2, M Naughton 0-1, T Keady 0-1.	Referee: JF Bailey (Dublin)

19 February 1989	Limerick	1-8 - 1-14	Galway	Gaelic Grounds, Limerick
	L Garvey 1-0, G Kirby 0-3, M Galligan 0-3, B Finn 0-1, D Marron 0-1.		J Cooney 0-5, M McGrath 0-4, E Ryan 1-0, G Burke 0-3, T Kilkenny 0-2.	Referee: P Delaney (Laois)

19 February 1989	Wexford	3-21 - 0-4	Waterford	Wexford Park, Wexford
	J Holohan 1-9, T Demspey 1-4, M Storey 1-1, S Fitzhenry 0-2, M Morrissey 0-2, M Fitzhenry 0-1, G O'Connor 0-1, J O'Connor 0-1.		K Delahunty 0-2, N Crowley 0-1, P Ryan 0-1.	Referee: W Horgan (Cork)

19 February 1989	Tipperary	2-15 - 0-7	Antrim	Semple Stadium, Thurles
	P McGrath 0-7, J Leahy 1-1, Cormac Bonnar 1-0, P Fox 0-2, D Carr 0-2, N English 0-2, J Cormack 0-1.		O McFetridge 0-3, A McGarry 0-1, C Barr 0-1, G O'Kane 0-1, D Donnelly 0-1.	Referee: T Murray (Limerick)

19 February 1989	Offaly	1-8 - 0-13	Kilkenny	St. Brendan's Park, Birr
	J Rigney 1-2, M Corrigan 0-4, D Pilkington 0-1, P Corrigan 0-1.		A Ronan 0-9, C Heffernan 0-3, L Ryan 0-1.	Referee: G Long (Tipperary)

5 March 1989	Galway	0-12 - 1-7	Tipperary	Duggan Park, Ballinasloe
	J Cooney 0-7, E Ryan 0-3, T Keady 0-1, P Malone 0-1.		S Nealon 1-4, J Cormack 0-2, D Carr 0-1.	Referee: P Long (Kilkenny)

5 March 1989	Antrim	1-12 - 0-17	Limerick	Casement Park, Belfast
	O McFetridge 0-8, B Donnelly 1-0, P McKillen 0-2, A McGarry 0-1, D Armstrong 0-1.		G Kirby 0-9, M Galligan 0-3, D Fitzgerald 0-2, L Garvey 0-2, B Finn 0-1.	Referee: W Horgan (Cork)

5 March 1989	Kilkenny	2-11 - 3-6	Wexford	Nowlan Park, Kilkenny
	A Ronan 0-7, L Ryan 1-2, T O'Keeffe 1-1, G Fennelly 0-1.		B Byrne 1-1, T Dunne 1-0, M Morrissey 1-0, J Holohan 0-2, J O'Connor 0-1, M Fitzhenry 0-1, S Fitzhenry 0-1.	Referee: P Delaney (Laois)

5 March 1989	Waterford	0-10 - 1-16	Offaly	Fraher Field, Dungarvan
	K Delahunty 0-3, N Crowley 0-3, G O'Connor 0-2, P Ryan 0-1, K Ryan 0-1.		M Corrigan 0-5, P Cleary 1-1, V Teehan 0-4, P Delaney 0-1, M Duignan 0-1, J Rigney 0-1, R Byrne 0-1, P O'Connor 0-1, D Pilkington 0-1.	Referee: T Murray (Limerick)

12 March 1989	Waterford	1-8 - 1-11	Limerick	Walsh Park, Waterford
	S Ahearne 1-4, J Beresford 0-1, N Crowley 0-1, A Cooney 0-1, B Lawton 0-1.		G Kirby 0-6, S Fitzgibbon 1-0, G Hegarty 0-1, D Flynn 0-1, J O'Connor 0-1, M Galligan 0-1, M Nelligan 0-1.	Referee: W Barrett (Tipperary)

12 March 1989	Tipperary	1-11 - 2-8	Kilkenny	Semple Stadium, Thurles
	P McGrath 1-3, N English 0-3, J Hayes 0-2, D Carr 0-1, D Ryan 0-1, J Leahy 0-1.		L Ryan 1-1, A Ronan 0-4, L Fennelly 1-0, A Prendergast 0-1, T O'Keeffe 0-1, C Heffernan 0-1.	Referee: J Moore (Waterford)

12 March 1989	Offaly	0-10 - 1-9	Antrim	St. Brendan's Park, Birr
	M Corrigan 0-6, P Delaney 0-2, P Cleary 0-1, J Rigney 0-1.		O McFetridge 1-4, P McKillen 0-1, D McMullen 0-1, B Donnelly 0-1, A McGarry 0-1, D McNaughton 0-1.	Referee: T Murray (Limerick)

12 March 1989	Galway	1-17 - 1-4	Wexford	Tuam Stadium, Tuam
	J Cooney 0-8, E Ryan 0-4, G Burke 1-0, A Staunton 0-2, P Higgins 0-2, M McGrath 0-1.		M Storey 1-2, M Morrissey 0-1, D Prendergast 0-1.	Referee: T Murray (Limerick)

=== Play-offs ===
9 April 1989 Relegation play-off	Wexford	3-21 - 2-9	Antrim	Croke Park, Dublin
	T Dempsey 0-10, S Byrne 2-2, S Wickham 1-3, G O'Connor 0-3, M Storey 0-1, B Prendergast 0-1, S Fitzhenry 0-1.		A McCarry 1-1, O McFetridge 0-4, T McNaughton 1-0, J McNaughton 0-2, M Sullivan 0-1, D McNaughton 0-1.	Referee: G Ryan (Tipperary)

23 April 1989 Relegation play-off	Antrim	3-15 - 2-16 (AET)	Offaly	Drogheda Park, Drogheda
	C Barr 2-0, A McCarry 1-3, O McFetridge 0-4, B Donnelly 0-3, D Armstrong 0-2, J McNaughton 0-1, M Sullivan 0-1, JP McKillop 0-1.		M Corrigan 0-10, P Cleary 1-2, M Duignan 1-1, J Rigney 0-2, J Dooley 0-1.	Referee: O Long (Kilkenny)

=== Knock-out stage ===
Quarter-finals

26 March 1989 Quarter-final	Dublin	1-17 - 0-12	Limerick	O'Moore Park, Portlaoise
	S McDermott 1-4, K Hetherton 0-4, S Dalton 0-3, MJ Ryan 0-3, S Fleming 0-1, J Morris 0-1, B McMahon 0-1.		G Kirby 0-6, M Galligan 0-1, S Fitzgibbon 0-1, M Nelligan 0-1, C Carey 0-1, M Reale 0-1, D Marron 0-1.	Attendance: 12,000; Referee: J Denton (Wexford)

2 April 1989 Quarter-final	Kilkenny	1-15 - 1-7	Cork	Semple Stadium, Thurles
	L Ryan 1-1, A Ronan 0-4, G Fennelly 0-4, R Power 0-3, L Fennelly 0-1, L Walsh 0-1, T O'Keeffe 0-1.		B Cunningham 1-1, M Mullins 0-2, P Kenneally 0-2, C Casey 0-1, T McCarthy 0-1.	Attendance: 7,500; Referee: P Delaney (Laois)

Semi-finals

16 April 1989 Semi-final	Tipperary	0-15 – 1-11	Kilkenny	Croke Park, Dublin
	N English 0-5, M Cleary 0-4, P McGrath 0-2, Conal Bonnar 0-2, D Ryan 0-1, J Cormack 0-1.		A Ronan 1-3, R Power 0-3, C Heffernan 0-1, L Fennelly 0-1, L Walsh 0-1, T O'Keeffe 0-1, L Ryan 0-1.	Attendance: 35,881; Referee: J Denton (Wexford)

16 April 1989 Semi-final	Galway	2-13 – 1-9	Dublin	Croke Park, Dublin
	J Cooney 1-3, E Ryan 1-0, T Keady 0-3, M McGrath 0-3, G Burke 0-3, M Ryan 0-1.		B McMahon 1-1, S McDermott 0-3, V Conroy 0-2, K Hetherton 0-2, J Twomey 0-1.	Attendance: 35,881; Referee: T Murray (Limerick)

Final

30 April 1989 Final	Galway	2-16 – 4-8	Tipperary	Croke Park, Dublin
	J Cooney 1-7, G Burke 1-2, E Ryan 0-3, M Naughton 0-2, M McGrath 0-1, M Coleman 0-1.		P McGrath 1-3, M Cleary 1-3, Cormac Bonnar 1-0, J Leahy 1-0, J Cormack 0-1, D Carr 0-1.	Attendance: 35,544; Referee: J Denton (Wexford)

=== Scoring statistics ===
Top scorers overall

Rank	Player	Team	Tally	Total
1	Adrian Ronan	Kilkenny	2-47	53
2	Mark Corrigan	Offaly	0-50	50
3	Joe Cooney	Galway	4-37	49
4	Pat McGrath	Tipperary	3-39	48
5	Gary Kirby	Limerick	2-35	41
6	Gerry Burke	Galway	7-14	35
7	Olcan McFetridge	Antrim	1-27	30
8	Éanna Ryan	Galway	4-16	28
8	Danny McNaughton	Antrim	2-22	28
10	Kieran Delahunty	Waterford	0-23	23

Top scorers in a single game

Rank	Player	Team	Tally	Total	Opposition
1	Gary Kirby	Limerick	2-06	12	Kilkenny
1	Jimmy Holohan	Wexford	1-09	12	Waterford
3	Paddy Corrigan	Offaly	2-04	10	Limerick
3	Danny McNaughton	Antrim	1-07	10	Wexford
3	Pat McGrath	Tipperary	1-07	10	Limerick
3	Joe Cooney	Galway	1-07	10	Tipperary
3	Pat McGrath	Tipperary	0-10	10	Wexford
3	Tom Dempsey	Wexford	0-10	10	Antrim
3	Mark Corrigan	Offaly	0-10	10	Antrim
10	Shane Fitzgibbon	Limerick	3-00	9	Wexford
10	Gerry Burke	Galway	2-03	9	Offaly
10	Adrian Ronan	Kilkenny	1-06	9	Waterford
10	Gary Kirby	Limerick	0-09	9	Antrim
10	Adrian Ronan	Kilkenny	0-09	9	Offaly

== Division 2 ==
National Hurling League Division 2
- Season: 1988-89
- Champions: Dublin
- Promoted: Cork
- Relegated: Derry; Kerry

Clare, Cork, Derry and Meath entered Division 2 as the promoted and relegated teams from the previous season.

On 12 March 1989, Dublin secured the title following a 3-7 to 1-3 win over Cork in the final round of the group stage. Cork secured promotion to Division 1 as the second-placed team.

Kerry and Derry were relegated from Division 2.

=== Table ===
Pos	Team	Pld	W	D	L	Pts	Notes
1	Dublin (C)	7	6	0	1	12	Promoted to Division 1
2	Cork	7	6	0	1	12	Promoted to Division 1
3	Clare	7	5	0	2	10	
4	Laois	7	4	1	2	9	
5	Westmeath	7	2	1	4	5	
6	Meath	7	1	1	5	3	
7	Derry	7	1	1	5	3	Relegated to Division 3
7	Kerry	7	1	0	6	2	Relegated to Division 3

=== Group stage ===
30 October 1988	Derry	1-09 - 1-11	Cork	Lavey GAA Grounds
			G O'Riordan 1-6, D O'Connell 0-1, G Fitzgerald 0-1, M Barry 0-1, B Harte 0-1, F Sheedy 0-1.

6 November 1988	Cork	1-13 - 1-08	Laois	Páirc Uí Chaoimh
	G O'Riordan 0-7, G Fitzgerald 1-0, M Barry 0-2, T O'Sullivan 0-1, L Kelly 0-1, D O'Connell 0-1, L Forde 0-1.

13 November 1988	Clare	2-07 - 4-09	Cork	Cusack Park
			G O'Riordan 0-5, L Forde 1-1, G Fitzgerald 1-0, M Foley 1-0, L Kelly 1-0, C Casey 0-1, T McCarthy 0-1, K Kingston 0-1.

27 November 1988	Cork	6-15 - 1-05	Westmeath	Páirc Uí Chaoimh
	M Foley 3-3, G Fitzgerald 1-4, L Forde 1-2, G O'Riordan 1-1, K Kingston 0-4, P Cahill 0-1.

19 February 1989	Cork	2-12 - 1-07	Kerry	Clonmult Memorial Park
	G Fitzgerald 1-1, T O'Sullivan 1-1, L Forde 0-4, M Mullins 0-3, J Cashman 0-1, K Kingston 0-1, T Cooney 0-1.

5 March 1989	Meath	0-04 - 3-10	Cork	St. Loman's Park
			M Mullins 3-3, T O'Sullivan 0-5, L Forde 0-1, M Foley 0-1.

12 March 1989	Dublin	3-07 - 1-03	Cork	Croke Park
			T O'Sullivan 1-0, M Mullins 0-2, J Cashman 0-1.

== Division 3 ==
National Hurling League Division 3
- Season: 1988-89
- Champions: Down
- Promoted: Carlow
- Relegated: Longford; Mayo

Down, Longford and Roscommon entered Division 3 as the promoted and relegated teams from the previous season.

On 12 March 1989, Down secured the title following a 7-5 to 1-9 win over Kildare in the final round of the group stage. Carlow secured promotion to Division 1 as the second-placed team.

Longford and Mayo were relegated from Division 3.

=== Table ===
Pos	Team	Pld	W	D	L	Pts	Notes
1	Down (C)	7	7	0	0	14	Promoted to Division 2
2	Carlow	7	6	0	1	12	Promoted to Division 2
3	Roscommon	6	4	0	2	8	
4	Kildare	7	4	0	3	8	
5	Armagh	7	3	0	3	6	
6	Wicklow	7	2	0	5	4	
7	Longford	6	0	0	6	0	Relegated to Division 4
7	Mayo	6	0	0	6	0	Relegated to Division 4

== Division 4 ==
National Hurling League Division 4
- Season: 1988-89
- Champions: Monaghan

Tyrone entered Division 4 as the relegated team from the previous season.

On 7 May 1989, Monaghan secured the title following a 4-7 to 1-9 win over Louth in the league final.

=== Knock-out stage ===
Semi-finals

23 April 1989 Semi-final	Monaghan	4-8 - 2-8	Fermanagh	Rory O'Moore Park, Belturbet

23 April 1989 Semi-final	Louth	2-11 - 0-11	Sligo	Cootehill

Final

7 May 1989 Final	Monaghan	4-7 - 1-9	Louth	Páirc Esler, Newry
