= 1998–99 All-Ireland Senior Club Hurling Championship =

All-Ireland Senior Club Hurling Championship 1998–99
Championship Details
- Dates: 11 October 1998 – 17 March 1999
- Teams: 27

All Ireland Champions
- Winners: St Josephs Doora-Barefield (1st win)
- Captain: Lorcan Hassett
- Manager: Michael Clohessy

All Ireland Runners-up
- Runners-up: Rathnure
- Captain: Joe Mooney
- Manager: Don Quigley

Provincial Champions
- Munster: St Josephs Doora-Barefield
- Leinster: Rathnure
- Ulster: Ballygalget
- Connacht: Athenry

Championship Statistics
- Matches Played: 26
- Top Scorer: Paul Codd (1–24)

The 1998–99 All-Ireland Senior Club Hurling Championship was the 29th staging of the All-Ireland Senior Club Hurling Championship, the Gaelic Athletic Association's premier inter-county club hurling tournament. The championship ran from 11 October 1998 to 17 March 1999.

Birr of Offaly were the defending champions, however, they failed to qualify after being beaten by St Rynagh's in the semi-finals of the 1998 Offaly SHC. Graigue–Ballycallan of Kilkenny and St Joseph's Doora-Barefield of Clare made their championship debuts.

The All-Ireland final was played at Croke Park in Dublin on 17 March 1999, between St Joseph's Doora-Barefield of Clare and Rathnure of Wexford, in what was a first championship meeting between the teams. St Joseph's Doora-Barefield won the match by 2–14 to 0–08 to claim a first title.

Rathnure's Paul Codd was the championship's top scorer with 1–24.

== Results ==
=== Connacht Senior Club Hurling Championship ===
First round

11 October 1998 First round	Tubbercurry	6–08 – 0–03	Gortletteragh
	M Burke 2–0, JP Walsh 1–2, B Walsh 1–0, R Brennan 1–0, B King 1–0, P Seevers 0–3, M Gorman 0–2, P Gannon 0–1.		C Ó Súilleabháin 0–1, S Duignan 0–1, S Heslin 0–1.

Quarter-final

17 October 1998 Quarter-final	Tubbercurry	2–06 – 0–14	Tooreen	Markievicz Park
	P Seevers 1–4, B Walsh 1–0, K Killeen 0–1, M Gorman 0–1.		Dom Greally 0–5, A Hession 0–4, Declan Greally 0–2, F Delaney 0–1, P Frayne 0–1, J Henry 0–1.	Referee: M Carroll (Roscommon)

Semi-final

31 October 1998 Semi-final	Tooreen	2–10 – 1–05	Oran	Aghamore Sportsfield
	Declan Greally 2–1, Dom Greally 0–7, A Hession, J Henry 0–1 each.		A Kelly 1–2, P Regan 0–2, B Flynn 0–1.

Final

15 November 1998 Final	Tooreen	0–05 – 3–25	Athenry	Aghamore Sportsfield
	Dom Greally 0–4, P Freyne 0–1,		P Healy 2–7, B Hanley 0–7, C Moran 0–5, A Poniard 1–1, J Rabbitte 0–2, B Higgins 0–2, P Higgins 0–1.

=== Leinster Senior Club Hurling Championship ===
First round

17 October 1998 First round	Naomh Eoin	1–6 – 1–8	Trim	Dr. Cullen Park
	B Murphy (1–3), C Jordan (0–2), D Murphy (0–1).	Report	I McCaffrey (1–2), A Smith (0–3), J Canty (0–2), R Fitzsimons (0–1).	Referee: D Ronan (Kilkenny)

24 October 1998 First round	Coill Dubh	2–18 – 1–1	Wolfe Tones	Geraldine Park
	A McAndrew 0–4, T Carew 0–4, C Carew 0–3, D Anderson 1–0, S Gordon 1–0, C Byrne 0–2, R Byrne 0–2, M Casey 0–1, D Behan 0–1, N Callaghan 0–1.		M McLoughlin 1–0, T Staken 0–1.

1 November 1998 First round	Lough Lene Gaels	0–9 – 0–12	Kiltegan	Cusack Park
	B Williams 0–2, P Williams 0–2, J Gavigan 0–2, J Kennedy 0–2, G Briody 0–1.		N Byrne 0–7, N Cremind 0–2, C O'Toole 0–1, J O'Toole 0–1, S Byrne 0–1.

1 November 1998 First round	Naomh Moninne	0–8 – 1–21	Craobh Chiaráin	St. Brigid's Park
	C Connolly (0–5, four frees), A Hoey (0–1, 65), D Dunne (0–1), P Murphy (0–1).	Report	C Ring (0–10, eight frees), S McDonnell (0–4), K Hetherington (1–0), G Ennis (0–2), K O'Donoghue (0–2), J McGurk (0–1), D Finn (0–1), R Farrelly (0–1).

Quarter-finals

Quarter-final	Portlaoise	w/o – scr.	Trim

15 November 1998 Quarter-final	Coill Dubh	0–11 – 4–19	Graigue-Ballycallan	Geraldine Park
	T Carew (0–6), R Byrne (0–2), A McAndrew (0–2), N Callaghan (0–1).	Report	D Cleere (2–7), M Hoyne (1–4), A Ronan (0–3), J Hoyne (0–2), James Young (0–2).	Referee: P Delaney (Laois)

15 November 1998 Quarter-final	Rathnure	1–12 – 0–7	Craobh Chiaráin	Enniscorthy
	P Codd (0–5), C Byrne (1–1), M Byrne (0–2), M O'Leary (0–2), A Codd (0–1), L Somers (0–1).	Report	C Ring (0–5), G Ryan (0–1), K Hetherton (0–1).	Referee: P Horan (Offaly)

22 November 1998 Quarter-final	Kiltegan	0–9 – 2–12	Seir Kieran	Pearse Park
	N Byrne (0–6), J Doyle (0–1), J O'Toole (0–1), J Keogh (0–1).	Report	M Coughlan (1–2), Johnny Dooley (0–5), B Dooley (1–1), Joe Dooley (0–2), E Coughlan (0–1), T J Dooley (0–1).

Semi-final

29 November 1998 Semi-final	Rathnure	3–11 – 2–8	Seir Kieran	Nowlan Park
	P Codd (1–4), C Byrne (1–4), M Morrissey (1–0), B O'Leary (0–2), R Guiney (0–1).	Report	Johnny Dooley (1–2, 0–2 from frees), M Mulrooeny (1–1), Joe Dooley (0–3 frees), M Coughlan (0–1), B Dooley (0–1).	Referee: P Aherne (Carlow)

29 November 1998 Semi-final	Portlaoise	0–6 – 0–5	Graigue-Ballycallan	Dr. Cullen Park
	Niall Rigney (0–3), T Fennelly (0–1), J Taylor (0–1), B Bohane (0–1).	Report	A Ronan (0–2), M Hoyne (0–2), D Cleere (0–1).	Referee: A Mac Suibhne (Dublin)

Final

13 December 1998 Final	Rathnure	1–13 – 1–6	Portlaoise	Nowlan Park
	P Codd (0–5, all frees), A Codd (1–1), M O'Leary (0–2), M Byrne (0–2), R Guiney (0–1), M Redmond (0–1), C Byrne (0–1).	Report	B Bohan (1–3, 2 frees), Niall Rigney (0–1, free), T Mulligan (0–1), B Fitzpatrick (0–1).	Referee: P Horan (Offaly)

=== Munster Senior Club Hurling Championship ===
Quarter-final

17 October 1998 Quarter-final	Mount Sion	4–10 – 2–10	Ahane	Walsh Park
	E McGrath (2–1), M White (1–2), B Browne (1–1), J Meaney (0–3), K McGrath (0–1), J O'Meara (0–1), R McGrath (0–1).	Report	J Moran (1–2), P Smith (1–0), T Herbert (0–3), M Fitzgerald (0–2), O Moran (0–1), A Smith (0–1), D O'Sullivan (0–1).	Referee: L O'Flynn (Cork)

8 November 1998 Quarter-final	Blackrock	2–18 – 2–7	Causeway	Church Road
	D Dempsey 1–3, A Coughlan 0–6, A Browne 1–2, B O'Keeffe 0–3, J Cashman 0–2, J O'Flynn 0–2.		J Dooley 1–4, JJ Canty 1–0, T Burke 0–1, S Sheehan 0–1, C Dineen 0–1.	Referee: M Wadding (Waterford)

Semi-final

22 November 1998 Semi-final	Mount Sion	0–7 – 1–13	St. Joseph's Doora-Barefield	Fraher Field
	K McGrath (0–2), M White (0–2), P Hammond (0–1), E McGrath (0–1), G Gater (0–1).	Report	J O'Connor (0–4), C O'Neill (1–0), A Whelan (0–3), L Hassett (0–3), S McMahon (0–2), O Baker (0–1).	Referee: J McDonnell (Tipperary)

22 November 1998 Semi-final	Toomevara	1–12 – 1–10	Blackrock	Semple Stadium
	Tommy Dunne (1–6, four frees), P O'Brien (0–2), K Cummins (0–2), Terry Dunne (0–1), K Dunne (0–1).	Report	A Browne (1–5, all from frees), N Keane (0–1, free), B O'Keeffe (0–1), D Dempsey (0–1), A Coughlan (0–1), J O'Flynn (0–1).	Referee: P O'Connor (Limerick)

Final

6 December 1998 Final	St. Joseph's Doora-Barefield	0–12 – 0–8	Toomevara	Gaelic Grounds
	J O'Connor (0–9, seven frees), L Hassett (0–1), G Baker (0–1), C O'Neill (0–1),	Report	Tomas Dunne (0–7, five frees), T Delaney (0–1, free).	Referee: P O'Connor (Limerick)

=== Ulster Senior Club Hurling Championship ===
Semi-final

18 October 1998 Semi-final	Ballygalget	3–9 – 1–12	Dungiven	Corrigan Park
	B Coulter 1–3, Martin Coulter jnr, P Savage 1–1 each, Martin Coulter snr 0–2, P Monan, J McGrattan 0–1 each.		G McGonigle 0–7, H Mullan 0–4, B McGilligan 1–0, JA Mullan 0–1.

Final

1 November 1998 Final	Ballycastle McQuillan's	3–7 – 1–13	Ballygalget	Corrigan Park
	B Coulter (0–4), J McGrattan (0–4), P Savage (1–0), P Coulter (0–3), M Coulter (Snr, 0–2).	Report	P McKillen (1–4), M Dallas (2–0), B Hill (0–1), M McShane, (0–1), B Donnelly (0–1).	Referee: G Devlin (Armagh)

15 November 1998 Final replay	Ballycastle McQuillan's	1–12 – 1–14 (aet)	Ballygalget	Corrigan Park
	C Kelly (1–1), M Dallas (0–2), B Hill (0–2), A Campbell (0–2), M McShane (0–2), P Jennings (0–1), T Kinney (0–1), P McKillen (0–1).	Report	J McGrattan (0–7), B Coulter (1–1), M Coulter, jun. (0–4), M Coulter sen (0–1), B Smyth (0–1).	Referee: G Devlin (Armagh)

=== All-Ireland Senior Club Hurling Championship ===
Quarter-final

6 December 1998 Quarter-final	Brothers Pearse	0–4 – 1–9	Ballygalget	Emerald GAA Grounds
	E Monaghan (0–3), B Keane (0–1).	Report	J McGrattan (0–5), M Coulter jun (1–1), B Coulter (0–1), B Smith (0–1), Philbin Savage( 0–1).	Referee: P Ahern (Carlow)

Semi-final

21 February 1999 Semi-final	St. Joseph's Doora-Barefield	1–13 – 1–12	Athenry	Semple Stadium
	J O'Connor (0–6, three frees), C O'Neill (1–0), L Hassett (0–2), A Whelan (0–2), S McMahon (0–2, frees), O Baker (0–1).	Report	E Cloonan (0–6, four frees), C Moran (1–1), B Hanley (0–2), B Keogh (0–1), J Rabbitte (0–1), D Moran (0–1).	Referee: P Horan (Offaly)

28 February 1999 Semi-final	Rathnure	2–19 – 1–8	Ballygalget	Parnell Park
	P Codd 0–14 (7f, 1 s'line, 1 '65) B O'Leary 1–3, A Codd 1–1, C Byrne 0–1.	Report	M Coulter Jnr 1–2 (1f) J McGrattan 0–3 (1f), P Savage, P Monan and M Coulter Snr (f) 0–1 each.	Referee: J McDonnell (Tipperary)

Final

17 March 1999 Final	St. Joseph's Doora-Barefield	2–14 – 0–8	Rathnure	Croke Park
	L Hassett 1–5, A Whelan 1–2, J O'Connor 0–4 (3f), S McMahon 0–1 (f), C O'Neill 0–1, J Considine 0–1.	Report	P Codd 0–6 (4f, 1 65), B O'Leary 0–1, A Codd 0–1.	Referee: P O'Connor (Limerick)

== Championship statistics ==
=== Top scorers ===
Top scorers overall

Rank	Player	County	Tally	Total	Matches	Average
1	Paul Codd	Rathnure	1–34	37	5	7.40
2	Jamesie O'Connor	St. Joseph's Doora-Barefield	0–23	23	4	5.75
3	Johnny McGrattan	Ballygalget	0–20	20	5	4.00
4	Tommy Dunne	Toomevara	1–13	16	2	8.00
4	Dom Greally	Tooreen	0–16	16	3	5.33
5	Brendan Coulter	Ballygalget	2-09	15	4	3.75
5	Connie Ring	Craobh Chiaráin	0–15	15	2	7.50
6	Liam Hassett	St. Joseph's Doora-Barefield	1–11	14	4	3.50
6	Damian Cleere	Graigue-Ballycallan	2-08	14	2	7.00
7	Paschal Healy	Athenry	2-07	13	1	13.00
7	Alan Browne	Blackrock	2-07	13	2	6.50
7	Colm Byrne	Rathnure	2-07	13	4	3.25
7	Nigel Byrne	Kiltegan	0–13	13	2	6.50

Top scorers in a single game

Rank	Player	County	Tally	Total	Opposition
1	Paul Codd	Rathure	0–14	14	Ballygalget
2	Paschal Healy	Athenry	2-07	13	Tooreen
2	Damien Cleere	Graigue Ballycallan	2-07	13	Coill Dubh
3	Connie Ring	Craobh Chiaráin	0–10	10	Naomh Moninne
4	Tommy Dunne	Toomevara	1-06	9	Blackrock
4	Jamesie O'Connor	St. Joseph's Doora-Barefield	0-09	9	Toomevara
5	Alan Browne	Blackrock	1-05	8	Toomevara
5	Liam Hassett	St. Joseph's Doora-Barefield	1-05	8	Rathnure
6	Eoin McGrath	Mount Sion	2-01	7	Ahane
6	Declan Greally	Tooreen	2-01	7	Oran
6	Paul Seevers	Tubbercurry	1-04	7	Tooreen
6	Michael Hoyne	Graigue-Ballycallan	1-04	7	Coill Dubh
6	Paul McKillen	Ballygalget	1-04	7	Ballycastle McQuillan's
6	Johnny Dooley	Causeway	1-04	7	Blackrock
6	Colm Byrne	Rathnure	1-04	7	Seir Kieran
6	Paul Codd	Rathnure	1-04	7	Seir Kieran
6	Dom Greally	Tooreen	0-07	7	Oran
6	Nigel Byrne	Kiltegan	0-07	7	Lough Lene Gaels
6	Tommy Dunne	Toomevara	0-07	7	St. Joseph's Doora-Barefield
6	Geoffrey McGonagle	Dungiven	0-07	7	Ballygalget
6	Johnny McGrattan	Ballygalget	0-07	7	Ballycastle McQuillan's

=== Miscellaneous ===
- Ballycastle McQuillan's represented Antrim in the Ulster Championship due to Dunloy's one-year ban from the competition.
