= Ray Barry =

Ray Barry may refer to:

- Ray Barry (hurler) (born 1972), Irish hurler
- Ray Barry (ice hockey) (1928–2018), American-born Canadian hockey player

== See also ==
- Raymond Barry (born 1949), Australian Olympic wrestler
- Raymond J. Barry (born 1939), American actor
- Ray Berry (born 1963), American football linebacker for the Minnesota Vikings and the Seattle Seahawks
- Raymond Berry (1933–2026), American football player for the Baltimore Colts and football coach for various teams
