= Ray Barry (hurler) =

Irish hurler

Personal information
- Native name: Réamann de Barra (Irish)
- Born: Passage East, County Waterford

Sport
- Sport: Hurling
- Position: Goalkeeper
Club
- Years: Club
- 1980's -: Passage
Inter-county
Years	County	Apps (scores)
1993-2002	Waterford	2 (0-00)
Inter-county titles
- Munster titles: 0
- All-Irelands: 0
- All Stars: 0

Ray Barry (born 1972) is a hurling goalkeeper who plays with Passage GAA at club level and formerly with Waterford GAA at inter-county level.

== Hurling career ==
Ray is considered as one of Waterford GAA's most skillful and entertaining goalkeeper from 1993 to 1997, he failed to hold place in the team after 1997 after a training ground incident with manager Gerald McCarthy, losing his place in goal to Ray Whity who was subsequently substituted in the opening championship fixture with Limerick by Brendan Landers. Ray was in goal for Waterfords All-Ireland Under 21 Hurling Championship winning team in 1992.

Ray was invited back onto the Waterford panel in 2002. In a challenge match he did one of his trademark clearances where he cleared a ball after chipping it over the opposing full forwards head. Majestic as this piece of skill looked he suffered the wrath of Justin McCarthy afterwards who claimed that such play could lead to critical errors on the field. Ray never played again for Waterford, citing the fact that he was more of an entertainer than a goalkeeper.

In 2008 Ray Barry took Clongeen of Wexford to a county final which against all the odds, won. They then to contest the Leinster Junior Hurling Final, his team suffering an agonising defeat at the hands of a swarthy Tullagher-Rosbercon of Kilkenny. This team featured the likes of future All Ireland winners Walter Walsh and Paddy Hartley. . .

== Honours ==
- All-Ireland Under 21 Hurling Championship winner - 1992
- Munster Under-21 Hurling Championship winner - 1992
- Waterford Intermediate Hurling Championship winner - 2007
- Waterford Senior Hurling Championship runner-up - 1993, 1994 and 1997

== Championship Appearances ==
#	Date	Venue	Opponent	Score	Result	Competition	Match report
1	21/05/1995	Páirc Uí Chaoimh, Cork	Tipperary	0-0	1-11 : 4-23	Munster Quarter-Final	Irish Times
2	02/06/1996	Walsh Park, Waterford	Tipperary	0-0	1-14 : 1-11	Munster Quarter-Final	Irish Times
