= Podge Byrne =

Irish hurler (1903–1962)

Personal information
- Native name: Pádraig Ó Broin (Irish)
- Born: 21 June 1903 Kilkenny, Ireland
- Died: 16 January 1962 (aged 58) Kilkenny, Ireland
- Occupation: Farmer

Sport
- Sport: Hurling
- Position: Centre-back
Club
- Years: Club
- 1923-1943: Dicksboro
Club titles
- Kilkenny titles: 2
Inter-county
- Years: County
- 1927-1937: Kilkenny
Inter-county titles
- Leinster titles: 7
- All-Irelands: 3
- NHL: 1

Patrick "Podge" Byrne (21 June 1903 – 16 January 1962) was an Irish hurler who played as a centre-back and midfielder for the Kilkenny senior team from 1927 until 1937.

Byrne made his first appearance for the team during the 1927 championship and became a regular player over the next decade. During that time he won three All-Ireland medals, seven Leinster medals and one National Hurling League medal.

Byrne enjoyed a two-decade long career with Dicksboro, winning two county championship medals.

His brother, Eddie Byrne, also played hurling with Kilkenny.
