= Shane Dalton =

Irish Gaelic footballer and lecturer

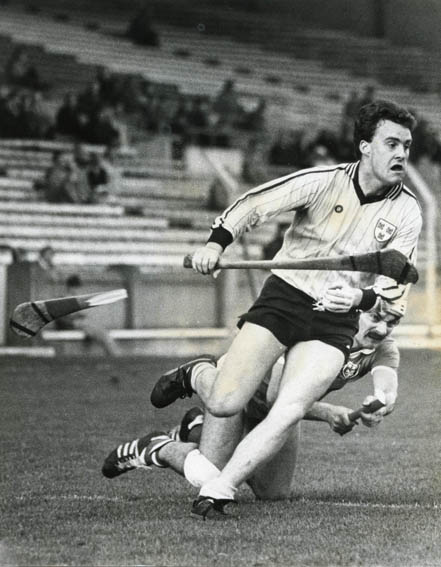
- Dalton playing for Dublin in 1985

Personal information
- Born: Dublin

Sport
- Football Position: Forward, midfield
- Hurling Position: Forward, midfield
Club
- Years: Club
- St Vincents
Club titles
	Football	Hurling
Dublin titles	1	1
Inter-county
- Years: County
- 1980s–1990s: Dublin

Shane Dalton is a former Dublin hurler and Gaelic footballer who played with St Vincents GAA club and the Dublin senior hurling team. As of 2014, he was a selector for the Dublin senior camogie team.

== Career ==
=== Club ===
A member of St Vincents GAA club, Dalton played with the St Vincents minor hurling team that won the Dublin minor championship in 1982. A dual player, he won senior titles in hurling and football with the club.

=== Inter-county ===
Dalton played minor, under-21 and senior hurling and Gaelic football for Dublin. He was mainly a forward but also played in midfield.

Dalton was a member of the Dublin Minor All-Ireland hurling team in 1983. This team, which included Niall Quinn, won the 1983 Leinster Minor Hurling Championship.

He had his debut with the Dublin Senior hurlers, playing against Tipperary in October 1983. Dalton played for Dublin in the National Hurling League in the late 1980s, and he won Division 2 National League hurling medals with Dublin in 1989 and 1997. He was a member of the Dublin hurling squad during the 1997 Leinster Senior Hurling Championship and 1998 National Hurling League. His last senior game was against Westmeath in 1999.

Dalton also played with the Dublin Senior footballers. In 1991, he was a sub for Dublin in a series of replayed games against Meath in the 1991 Leinster Senior Football Championship.

He was selected to represent Leinster and was on the Leinster team that won the 1988 Railway Cup Hurling Championship.

=== Management ===
Dalton was the manager of the St Vincents hurling team that won the Dublin Minor Hurling Championship in 2002. In 2011 he managed the senior camogie team in St Vincents. This team went on to win the Division 1 league three times, and were runners up in three championship finals. As of 2014, Dalton was a selector for the Senior Dublin camogie team.

== Honours ==
=== Club (St Vincents) ===
- Dublin Senior Football Championship (1984)
- Leinster Senior Club Football Championship (1984)
- Dublin Senior Hurling Championship (1988)

=== Inter-county (Dublin) ===
- National Hurling League Division 2 (1989, 1997)
- Leinster Under-21 Football Championship (1984)
- Leinster Minor Hurling Championship (1983)

=== Inter-provincial (Leinster) ===
- Railway Cup hurling medal (1988)
