= Kieran Stevenson =

Irish hurler

Personal information
- Native name: Ciarán Mac Stiofáin (Irish)
- Born: 1970 (age 55–56) Banagher, County Londonderry, Northern Ireland

Sport
- Sport: Hurling
- Position: Goalkeeper
Club
- Years: Club
- Banagher
Club titles
- Derry titles: 1
Inter-county
- Years: County
- 1995-2006: Derry
Inter-county titles
- Ulster titles: 2
- All-Irelands: 0
- NHL: 0
- All Stars: 0

Kieran Stevenson (born 1970) is a former hurler from Northern Ireland, who played as a goalkeeper at senior level for the Derry county team.

Stevenson joined the panel during the 1995 championship and subsequently became the first-choice goalkeeper until his retirement after the 2006 Nicky Rackard Cup.

At club level Stevenson is a one-time county club championship medalist with Banagher.

== Honours ==
Derry

- Ulster Senior Hurling Championship (2) 2000 2001
- Nicky Rackard Cup (1) 2006
- Ulster Under-21 Hurling Championship (1) 1997

Club

- Derry Minor Hurling Championship (3) 1992 1993 1990
- Derry Senior Hurling League (2) 1999 2001
- Derry Senior Hurling Championship (1) 2000
