= Ollie Fahy =

Irish hurler

Personal information
- Native name: Oilibhéar Ó Fathaigh (Irish)
- Born: 21 October 1975 (age 51) Gort, County Galway, Ireland
- Occupation: Sales rep
- Height: 6 ft 0 in (183 cm)

Sport
- Sport: Hurling
- Position: Full Forward
Club
- Years: Club
- 20: Gort
Club titles
- Galway titles: 1
Inter-county
Years	County	Apps (scores)
1994-2004	Galway	12 (6-24)
Inter-county titles
- Connacht titles: 5
- All-Irelands: 0 Railway cup = 2
- NHL: 3
- All Stars: 0

Oliver Fahy (born 21 October 1975) is an Irish hurler who played as a full-forward for the Galway senior team.

Fahy joined the team during the 1994-95 National League and subsequently became a regular member of the starting fifteen until his retirement after the 2004 National League. During that time he won five consecutive Connacht medals and two National League medals.

At club level Fahy is a one-time county club championship medalist with Gort.
