= 2000 Railway Cup Hurling Championship =

Irish hurling competition

2000 Railway Cup
- Date: 11 November 2000 - 12 November 2000
- Teams: Connacht; Leinster; Munster; Ulster
- Champions: Munster (42nd title); Fergal Ryan (captain)
- Runners-up: Leinster; Willie O'Connor (captain)

Tournament statistics
- Matches played: 3
- Goals scored: 11 (3.67 per match)
- Points scored: 78 (26 per match)
- Top scorer(s): Joe Deane (1-11)

The 2000 Railway Cup Hurling Championship was the 73rd series of the inter-provincial hurling Railway Cup. Three matches were played between 11 November 2000 and 12 November 2000 to decide the title. It was contested by Connacht, Leinster, Munster and Ulster.

Connacht entered the championship as the defending champions, however, they were defeated by Munster at the semi-final stage.

On 12 November 2000, Munster won the Railway Cup after a 3-15 to 2-15 defeat of Leinster in the final at Nowlan Park, Kilkenny. It was their 42nd Railway Cup title overall and their first title since 1997.

Munster's Joe Deane was the Railway Cup top scorer with 1-11.

== Results ==
Semi-finals

11 November 2000 Semi-final	Leinster	1-15 - 1-07	Ulster	Palmerstown Sportsfield, Kilkenny
	DJ Carey 1-5, H Shefflin 0-4, G Hanniffy 0-2, A Fenlon 0-1, J Power 0-1, N Horan 0-1, C Carter 0-1.		G McGrattan 1-1, G O'Kane 0-2, C McCambridge 0-2, G Biggs 0-1, A Delargy 0-1.	Attendance: 80

11 November 2000 Semi-final	Munster	1-19 - 3-07	Connacht	Páirc Lachtáin, Freshford
	J Deane 0-7, J Leahy 0-5, A Browne 1-0, O Moran 0-2, TJ Ryan 0-2, D Forde 0-1, B O'Meara 0-1, P Flynn 0-1, S McGrath 0-1.		R Gantley 1-3, C Murray 1-1, M Kerins 1-0, O Canning 0-1, F Gantley 0-1, O Fahy 0-1.	Attendance: 50; Referee: D Murphy (Wexford)

Final

12 November 2000 Final	Leinster	2-15 - 3-15	Munster	Nowlan Park, Kilkenny
	C Carter 1-7, DJ Carey 0-4, H Shefflin 1-0, B Whelehan 0-2, A Comerford 0-1, A Hanlon 0-1.		S McGrath 2-1, J Deane 1-4, A Browne 0-3, J Leahy 0-2, B O'Meara 0-2, A Markham 0-1, P Flynn 0-1, TJ Ryan 0-1.	Referee: J McClean (Antrim)

== Top scorers ==
Overall

Rank	Player	County	Tally	Total	Matches	Average
1	Joe Deane	Munster	1-11	14	2	7.00
2	D. J. Carey	Leinster	1-09	12	2	6.00
3	Charlie Carter	Leinster	1-08	11	2	5.50
4	Seánie McGrath	Munster	2-02	8	2	4.00
3	Henry Shefflin	Leinster	1-04	7	2	3.50

Single game

Rank	Player	County	Tally	Total	Opposition
1	Charlie Carter	Leinster	1-07	10	Munster
2	D. J. Carey	Leinster	1-05	8	Ulster
3	Seánie McGrath	Munster	2-01	7	Leinster
3	Joe Deane	Munster	1-04	7	Leinster
3	Joe Deane	Munster	0-07	7	Connacht

== Sources ==
- Donegan, Des, The Complete Handbook of Gaelic Games (DBA Publications Limited, 2005).
