= 1999 Railway Cup Hurling Championship =

Irish hurling competition

- Dates: 7 November 1999 - 21 November 1998
- Teams: 4
- Champions: Connacht (10th title); Joe Rabbitte (captain)
- Runners-up: Munster

Tournament statistics
- Matches played: 3
- Goals scored: 8 (2.67 per match)
- Points scored: 95 (31.67 per match)
- Top scorer(s): Tommy Dunne (1-10)

The 1999 Railway Cup Hurling Championship was the 71st staging of the Railway Cup since its establishment by the Gaelic Athletic Association in 1927. The cup began on 7 November 1999 and ended on 21 November 1999.

Leinster were the defending champions, however, they were beaten by Connacht in the semi-final.

On 21 November 1999, Connacht won the cup after a 2-13 to 1–15 defeat of Munster in the final at Semple Stadium. This was their 10th Railway Cup title overall and their first title since 1994.

== Results ==
=== Semi-finals ===
7 November 1999 Semi-final	Ulster	3-14 - 0-29	Munster	Casement Park, Belfast
	B Coulter 2-0, G McGonigle 1-0, Greg O'Kane 0-3, O Collins 0-3, J Carson 0-3, Gary O'Kane 0-2, S Mullan 0-1, C McGuckian 0-1, J Close 0-1.		J Deane 0-8, T Dunne 0-5, N Gilligan 0-4, S McGrath 0-3, F McCormack 0-3, S Moran 0-2, M O'Connell 0-1, O Moran 0-1, D Shanahan 0-1.	Referee: E Morris (Dublin)

7 November 1999 Semi-final	Leinster	1-10 - 1-14	Connacht	St. Brendan's Park, Birr
	Johnny Dooley 0-7, M Storey 1-2, H Shefflin 0-1.		E Cloonan 0-6, O Canning 1-2, K Broderick 0-2, O Fahy 0-2, F Flynn 0-1, J Rabbitte 0-1.

=== Final ===
21 November 1999 Final	Munster	1-15 - 2-13	Connacht	Semple Stadium, Thurles
	T Dunne 1-5, L Cahill 0-3, A Markham 0-2, M O'Connell 0-2, S McGrath 0-2, K McGrath 0-1.		O Fahy 1-4, K Broderick 1-1, E Cloonan 0-4, A Kerins 0-2, M Kerins 0-1, J Rabbitte 0-1.	Attendance: 487; Referee: B Kelly (Westmeath)

== Bibliography ==
- Donegan, Des, The Complete Handbook of Gaelic Games (DBA Publications Limited, 2005).
