= Stephen Brenner =

Irish hurler

Personal information
- Born: Waterford, Ireland
- Height: 6 ft 1 in (185 cm)

Sport
- Sport: Hurling
- Position: Goalkeeper
Club
- Years: Club
- 1991 – present: De La Salle
Club titles
- Waterford titles: 3
- All-Ireland Titles: 0
Inter-county
- Years: County
- 1998–2005: Waterford
Inter-county titles
- Munster titles: 2
- All-Irelands: 0
- NHL: 0
- All Stars: 0

Stephen Brenner (born 1974 in Waterford, Ireland) is an Irish sportsperson. He plays hurling as a goalkeeper with his local club De La Salle and was a member of the Waterford senior inter-county team from the 1990s until the 2000s.
