= Tomás McGrane =

Irish hurler

Personal information
- Born: 22 September 1979 (age 47) Dublin, Ireland

Sport
- Sport: GAA
- Position: Right corner-forward
Club
- Years: Club
- St. Vincent's
Club titles
- Dublin titles: 0
Inter-county*
Years	County	Apps (scores)
1998-2006	Dublin	17 (3-78)
Inter-county titles
- Leinster titles: 0
- All-Irelands: 0
- NHL: 0
- All Stars: 0
- *Inter County team apps and scores correct as of 22:29, 1 August 2012.

Tomás McGrane (born 22 September 1979) is an Irish hurler who played as a right corner-forward for the Dublin senior team.

McGrane made his first appearance for the team during a pre-season series of games in 1998 and was a regular member of the starting fifteen until his retirement after the 2006 National League.

At club level McGrane plays with St. Vincent's.
