= Eddie Byrne (hurler) =

Irish hurler (1905–1944)

Personal information
- Native name: Éamonn Ó Broin (Irish)
- Nickname: Ned
- Born: 29 October 1905 Kilkenny, Ireland
- Died: 29 October 1944 (aged 39) Kilkenny, Ireland

Sport
- Sport: Hurling
- Position: Midfield
Clubs
- Years: Club
- Dicksboro; Young Irelands
Inter-county
- Years: County
- 1929-1930 1931-1938: Dublin; Kilkenny
Inter-county titles
- Leinster titles: 5
- All-Irelands: 3
- NHL: 2

Edward "Eddie" Byrne (29 October 1905 – 29 October 1944) was an Irish hurler who played as a midfielder for the Dublin and Kilkenny senior teams.

Byrne made his first appearance for the Dublin team during the 1929 championship and became a regular player on the inter-county scene over the next decade. During that time he won three All-Ireland medals, five Leinster medals and two National Hurling League medal.

Byrne enjoyed a lengthy club career with Dicksboro and Young Irelands.

His brother, Podge Byrne, also played hurling with Kilkenny.
