= Paul Codd =

Irish hurler (born 1976)

Personal information
- Native name: Pól Mac Óda (Irish)
- Born: 1 December 1976 (age 49) Rathnure, County Wexford, Ireland
- Occupation: Farmer

Sport
- Sport: Hurling
- Position: Forward
Club
- Years: Club
- Rathnure
Club titles
- Wexford titles: 5
- Leinster titles: 1
- All-Ireland Titles: 0
Inter-county*
Years	County	Apps (scores)
1995-2006	Wexford	32 (5-127)
Inter-county titles
- Leinster titles: 3
- All-Irelands: 1
- *Inter County team apps and scores correct as of 00:20, 12 June 2022.

Paul Codd (born 1 December 1976) is an Irish former hurler. At club level, he played with Rathnure and at inter-county level was a member of the Wexford senior hurling team.

== Career ==
At club level, Codd first played for Rathnure at juvenile and underage levels, before progressing to adult level. He went on to win four Wexford SHC titles between 1996 and 2003, as well as a Leinster Club SHC medal in 1998. Codd was also part of the Rathnure team beaten by St Joseph's Doora-Barefield in the 1999 All-Ireland club final. He won a fifth and final SHC title after a defeat of Oulart–The Ballagh in 2006.

Codd first appeared on the inter-county scene with Wexford as part of the under-21 team. He won a Leinster U21HC medal before facing defeat by Galway in the 1996 All-Ireland under-21 final. Codd made his senior team debut in 1995. He won a Leinster SHC medal in 1996, before coming on as a substitute for Garry Laffan when Wexford beat Limerick in the 1996 All-Ireland final.

A second Leinster SHC medal followed for Codd in 1997, when Wexford retained the title after a defeat of Kilkenny. He claimed a third Leinster winner's medal in 2004. Codd retired from inter-county hurling in December 2006.

== Honours ==
Rathnure

- Leinster Senior Club Hurling Championship: 1998
- Wexford Senior Hurling Championship: 1996, 1998, 2002, 2003, 2006

Wexford

- All-Ireland Senior Hurling Championship: 1996
- Leinster Senior Hurling Championship: 1996, 1997, 2004

Sporting positions
Preceded by Martin Storey	Wexford senior hurling team captain 1999	Succeeded by Rory McCarthy
Preceded by Larry O'Gorman	Wexford senior hurling team captain 2003	Succeeded by John O'Connor
