= Gary Biggs =

Irish hurler

Personal information
- Native name: Garraí Ó Beig (Irish)
- Born: 1977 (age 48–49) Banagher, County Londonderry, Northern Ireland

Sport
- Sport: Hurling
- Position: Left wing-forward
Club
- Years: Club
- Banagher
Club titles
- Derry titles: 1
Inter-county*
Years	County	Apps (scores)
1998-2006	Derry	17 (3-28)
Inter-county titles
- Ulster titles: 2
- All-Irelands: 0
- NHL: 0
- All Stars: 0
- *Inter County team apps and scores correct as of 17:32, 2 August 2012.

Gary Biggs (born 1977) is a former hurler from Northern Ireland, who played as a left-wing forward at senior level for the Derry county team.

Biggs joined the panel during the 1997 championship and immediately became a regular member of the starting fifteen until his retirement after the 2006 Nicky Rackard Cup. During that time he won one Nicky Rackard Cup medal and two Ulster medals.

At club level Biggs is a one-time county club championship medalist with Banagher.
