= 1998 National Hurling League =

67th season of the National Hurling League

League details
- Dates: 8 March – 25 July 1998
- Teams: 33

League champions
- Winners: Cork (14th win)

Other division winners
- Division 2: Kerry
- Division 3: Mayo

The 1998 National Hurling League (known as the Church & General National Hurling League) was the 67th season of the National Hurling League.

== Division 1 ==
National Hurling League Division 1
- Season: 1998
- Champions: Cork; 14th National League title Captain: Diarmuid O'Sullivan; Manager: Jimmy Barry-Murphy
- Matches: 33
- Top goalscorer: Joe Deane (3-30)
- Biggest home win: Clare 3-21 - 2-7 Antrim (8 March 1988)
- Biggest away win: Cork 2-15 - 0-10 Clare (3 May 1998)
- Highest scoring: Clare 3-21 - 2-7 Antrim (8 March 1988)
- All statistics correct as of 10 March 2017.

The league saw a major restructuring of the usual four divisions of eight teams. Division 1 was split into Group 1A and Group 1B with each group consisting of six teams. The top two teams in each group qualified for the knock-out stage.

Limerick came into the season as defending champions of the 1997 season. Antrim, Cork, Dublin and Waterford all entered Division 1 as part of the restructuring.

On 17 May 1998, Cork won the title after a 2–14 to 0–13 win over Waterford in the final. It was their 14th league title overall and their first since 1992-93.

Cork's Joe Deane was the Division 1 top scorer with 3-30.

=== Division 1A table ===
Pos	Team	Pld	W	D	L	F	A	Diff	Pts	Notes
1	Limerick	5	5	0	0	7-57	4-58	18	10	
2	Clare	5	3	0	2	5-83	9-52	19	6	
3	Galway	5	3	0	2	9-67	4-66	16	6	
4	Dublin	5	2	0	3	8-59	5-62	6	4	
5	Offaly	5	1	0	4	6-62	10-58	-8	2	
6	Antrim	5	1	0	4	7-47	9-49	-8	2	

=== Group stage ===
8 March 1998	Dublin	1-13 - 1-9	Galway	Parnell Park, Dublin
	T McGrane 1-5, S Dalton 0-4, E Morrissey 0-2, C McCann 0-1, B O'Sullivan 0-1.		P Hardiman 1-0, E Cloonan 0-2, F Forde 0-2, C Moore 0-2, K Broderick 0-1, J Rabbitte 0-1.	Referee: D Murphy (Wexford)

8 March 1998	Offaly	0-13 - 2-11	Limerick	O'Connor Park, Tullamore
	Johnny Dooley 0-7, J Ryan 0-3, K Farrell 0-2, P Mulhare 0-1.		M Galligan 1-4, G Kirby 1-3, O Moran 0-2, TJ Ryan 0-1, J Moran 0-1.	Referee: T Ó Floinn (Cork)

8 March 1998	Clare	3-21 - 2-7	Antrim	Cusack Park, Ennis
	J O'Connor 0-10, N Gilligan 1-2, A Markham 1-1, B Quinn 1-0, F Hegarty 0-3, D Forde 0-2, F Lohan 0-2, S McMahon 0-1.		J McIntosh 1-2, J Carson 0-2, C Hamill 0-1, A Delargy 0-1, C Kelly 0-1.	Referee: J McDonnell (Tipperary)

22 March 1998	Limerick	2-11 - 0-12	Clare	Gaelic Grounds, Limerick
	G Kirby 1-5, M Galligan 0-4, B Foley 1-0, TJ Ryan 0-1, S O'Neill 0-1.		J O'Connor 0-3, S McMahon 0-3, N Gilligan 0-3, A Markham 0-1, D Fitzgerald 0-1, F Hegarty 0-1.	Referee: G Harrington (Cork)

22 March 1998	Galway	3-15 - 1-12	Offaly	Kenny Park, Athenry
	F Forde 1-8, J Rabbitte 1-1, K Broderick 1-1, J Campbell 0-2, D Moran 0-2, C Moore 0-1.		J Troy 0-7, B Dooley 1-0, J Ryan 0-3, C Cassidy 0-2.	Referee: W Barrett (Tipperary)

22 March 1998	Antrim	2-11 - 1-8	Dublin	Casement Park, Belfast
	A Elliot 0-4, J Elliot 0-4, A Delargy 1-0, J O'Neill 1-0, C McGuckian 0-2, J Carson 0-1.		E Morrissey 1-2, T McGrane 0-3, J Brennan 0-2, S Perkins 0-1.	Referee: G Devlin (Armagh)

29 March 1998	Galway	1-9 - 1-10	Limerick	Kenny Park, Athenry
	L Burke 1-1, F Forde 0-3, K Broderick 0-3, A Kerins 0-1, J Campbell 0-1.		M Galligan 0-8, S O'Neill 1-0, G Hegarty 0-2.	Referee: P Neary (Limerick)

29 March 1998	Dublin	2-8 - 1-18	Clare	Parnell Park, Donnycarney
	E Morrissey 2-1, J Brennan 0-2, T McGrane 0-2, D Sweeney 0-1, S Perkins 0-1, D McMullen 0-1.		J O'Connor 0-5, N Gilligan 0-4, C Clancy 1-0, S McMahon 0-3, C Lynch 0-2, A Markham 0-2, D Forde 0-1, B Murphy 0-1.	Referee: J Gribben (Down)

29 March 1998	Offaly	3-13 - 0-9	Antrim	St. Brendan's Park, Birr
	J Ryan 2-0, M Duignan 1-3, K Farrell 0-3, H Rigney 0-2, C Cassidy 0-2, J Troy 0-2, D Hanniffy 0-1.		J Elliot 0-3, C McGuckian 0-2, S McMullen 0-2, J Carson 0-1, M Molloy 0-1.	Referee: M Wadding (Waterford)

12 April 1998	Limerick	0-11 - 1-6	Dublin	FitzGerald Park, Kilmallock
	G Kirby 0-4, M Hoilihan 0-1, A Carmody 0-1, J Moran 0-1, M Galligan 0-1, TJ Ryan 0-1, D Quigley 0-1, D Hennessy 0-1.		E Morrissey 1-0, T McGrane 0-3, C McCann 0-2, B O'Sullivan 0-1.	Referee: J McDonnell (Tipperary)

12 April 1998	Antrim	1-12 - 2-19	Galway	Casement Park, Belfast
	J Elliot 0-5, A Elliot 1-1, G O'Kane 0-2, C McGuckian 0-1, K Kelly 0-1, P McKillen 0-1, J Cashin 0-1.		O Fahy 1-4, D Coen 0-6, J Rabbitte 1-0, F Forde 0-3, C Moore 0-2, A Kerins 0-2, L Burke 0-1, M Donoghue 0-1.	Referee: P Delaney (Laois)

12 April 1998	Clare	1-13 - 1-11	Offaly	Cusack Park, Ennis
	B Murphy 1-0, D Forde 0-3, J O'Connor 0-3, N Gilligan 0-3, S McMahon 0-1, C Lynch 0-1, O Baker 0-1, F Tuohy 0-1.		Johnny Dooley 0-6, J Ryan 1-0, J Troy 0-2, Joe Dooley 0-1, N Murphy 0-1, K Martin 0-1.	Referee: W Barrett (Tipperary)

19 April 1998	Clare	0-19 - 2-15	Galway	Cusack Park, Ennis
	J o'Connor 0-6, N Gilligan 0-3, D Forde 0-3, B Murphy 0-3, C Lynch 0-2, A Markham 0-1, S McMahon 0-1.		D Coen 0-12, K Broderick 2-0, C Moore 0-1, L Burke 0-1, J Rabbitte 0-1.	Referee: D MUrphy (Wexford)

19 April 1998	Dublin	4-10 - 1-13	Offaly	Parnell Park, Donnycarney
	E Morrissey 2-1, J Brennan 0-6, C McCann 1-1, N Butler 1-1, B O'Sullivan 0-1.		M Duignan 1-2, K Farrell 0-3, J Troy 0-3, G Hanniffy 0-2, P Mulhare 0-1, H Rigney 0-1, B Dooley 0-1.	Referee: M Wadding (Waterford)

19 April 1998	Limerick	2-14 - 2-8	Antrim	Gaelic Grounds, Limerick
	D Quigley 1-1, P Tobin 1-1, G Kirby 0-4, M Galligan 0-3, M Houlihan 0-2, O Moran 0-1, M Foley 0-1, J Moran 0-1.		C McGuckian 1-1, Greg O'Kane 1-0, Gary O'Kane 0-2, P McKillen 0-1, M Molloy 0-1, J Carson 0-1, A Elliot 0-1, J Elliot 0-1.	Referee: W Barrett (Tipperary)

=== Division 1B table ===
Pos	Team	Pld	W	D	L	F	A	Diff	Pts	Notes
1	Cork	5	4	1	0	5-64	6-42	19	9	Division 1 champions
2	Waterford	5	3	1	1	8-64	8-52	12	7	Division 1 runners-up
3	Wexford	5	2	2	1	4-60	2-60	6	6	
4	Tipperary	5	1	1	3	10-52	7-57	4	3	
5	Laois	5	1	1	3	3-54	8-56	-17	3	
6	Kilkenny	5	1	0	4	5-54	5-69	-15	2	

=== Group stage ===
8 March 1998	Wexford	1-14 - 1-11	Laois	Páirc Uí Shíocháin, Gorey
	P Codd 0-9, T Dempsey 1-2, J Purcell 0-1, M Storey 0-1, M Jordan 0-1.		C Cuddy 0-6, D Cuddy 1-0, P Cuddy 0-2, PJ Peacock 0-1, D Conroy 0-1, D Rooney 0-1.	Referee: P Ahearne (Carlow)

8 March 1998	Tipperary	4-6 - 1-17	Waterford	Semple Stadium, Thurles
	L Cahill 2-0, D Ryan 1-3, M Kennedy 1-0, K Tucker 0-2, R Ryan 0-1.		P Flynn 1-6, K McGrath 0-7, D Shanahan 0-2, G Gater 0-1, B O'Sullivan 0-1.	Referee: P Delaney (Laois)

8 March 1998	Cork	0-16 - 1-8	Kilkenny	Páirc Uí Chaoimh, Cork
	J Deane 0-8, P Ryan 0-3, M O'Connell 0-2, B O'Driscoll 0-1, S McGrath 0-1, A Browne 0-1.		A O'Connor 1-3, N Moloney 0-2, S Ryan 0-2, PJ Delaney 0-1.	Referee: P O'Connor (Limerick)

22 March 1998	Laois	1-13 - 1-13	Tipperary	O'Moore Park, Portlaoise
	D Cuddy 0-6, D Conroy 1-0, D Rooney 0-2, C Cuddy 0-2, O Coss 0-1, N Rigney 0-1, P Cuddy 0-1.		M Kennedy 1-3, E O'Neill 0-4, L Cahill 0-2, J Leahy 0-2, R Ryan 0-1, D O'Connor 0-1.	Referee: S McMahon (Clare)

22 March 1998	Waterford	1-5 - 1-12	Cork	Fraher Field, Dungarvan
	P Flynn 1-0, K McGrath 0-2, G Harris 0-1, D Shanahan 0-1, B O'Sullivan 0-1.		J Deane 1-3, F McCormack 0-3, B O'Driscoll 0-3, M O'Connell 0-1, K Murray 0-1.	Referee: P Horan (Offaly)

22 March 1998	Kilkenny	0-15 - 0-9	Wexford	Nowlan Park, Kilkenny
	N Moloney 0-5, C Carter 0-1, P Barry 0-1.		P Codd 0-6, T Dempsey 0-1.	Referee: A Mac Suibhne (Dublin)

29 March 1998	Tipperary	3-13 - 1-13	Kilkenny	Semple Stadium, Thurles
	M Kennedy 1-2, E o'Neill 0-5, P Kelly 1-1, D Ryan 1-0, L Cahill 0-3, R Ryan 0-2.		N Moloney 1-6, PJ Delaney 0-2, D Byrne 0-2, A Comerford 0-2, P O'Neill 0-1.	Referee: J Cooney (Galway)

29 March 1998	Wexford	1-11 - 1-11	Cork	O'Kennedy Park, New Ross
	P Codd 0-7, R McCarthy 1-1, M Jordan 0-2, M Storey 0-1.		J Deane 1-3, S McGrath 0-4, F McCormack 0-3, A Browne 0-1.	Referee: P Horan (Offaly)

29 March 1998	Laois	1-9 - 4-11	Waterford	O'Moore Park, Portlaoise
	P Cuddy 0-3, C Cuddy 1-0, D Cuddy 0-2, L Tynan 0-2, O Dowling 0-1, D Rooney 0-1.		P Flynn 2-4, D Bennett 2-2, K McGrath 0-4, D Shanahan 0-1.	Referee: T McIntyre (Antrim)

12 April 1998	Cork	2-11 - 2-10	Tipperary	Páirc Uí Rinn, Cork
	J Deane 1-4, A Browne 1-1, B Egan 0-2, F McCormack 0-2, P Ryan 0-2.		P Kelly 1-2, E O'Neill 0-5, M Kennedy 1-0, J Enright 0-1, R Ryan 0-1, D Ryan 0-1.	Referee: A Mac Suibhne (Dublin)

12 April 1998	Kilkenny	1-5 - 0-13	Laois	Nowlan Park, Kilkenny
	N Moloney 1-0, DJ Carey 0-2, C Carter 0-1, A Ronan 0-1, K O'Shea 0-1.		D Cuddy 0-8, D Rooney 0-2, P Cuddy 0-2, PJ Peacock 0-1.	Referee: P Aherane (Carlow)

12 April 1998	Waterford	0-13 - 0-13	Wexford	Walsh Park, Waterford
	K McGrath 0-5, D Bennett 0-3, D Shanahan 0-2, P Flynn 0-2, T Browne 0-1.		P Codd 0-4, T Dempsey 0-3, M Storey 0-3, A Fenlon 0-1, L Murphy 0-1, M Jordan 0-1.	Referee: P O'Connor (Limerick)

19 April 1998	Wexford	2-13 - 0-10	Tipperary	Enniscorthy
	P Codd 1-7, T Dempsey 1-1, M Jordan 0-1, L Murphy 0-1, D Ruth 0-1, A Fenlon 0-1, R McCarthy 0-1.		E O'Neill 0-6, D Ryan 0-2, P Kelly 0-1, L Cahill 0-1.	Referee: J Cooney (Galway)

19 April 1998	Cork	1-13 - 1-8	Laois	Páirc Mac Gearailt, Fermoy
	P Ryan 0-5, A Browne 1-0, S O'Farrell 0-3, F McCormack 0-3, S McGrath 0-1, A Walsh 0-1.		D Cuddy 0-6, PJ Peacock 1-0, P Cuddy 0-2.

19 April 1998	Waterford	2-18 - 2-13	Kilkenny	Walsh Park, Waterford
	P Flynn 1-5, D Shanahan 1-2, K McGrath 0-5, D Bennett 0-2, B O'Sullivan 0-2, T Browne 0-1, A Kirwan 0-1.		PJ Delaney 1-2, DJ Carey 0-5, K O'Shea 1-1, S Ryan 0-1, C Carter 0-1, C Brennan 0-1, P Barry 0-1, P Larkin 0-1.	Referee: S McMahon (Clare)

=== Knock-out stage ===
Semi-finals

3 May 1998 Semi-final	Cork	2-15 - 0-10	Clare	Semple Stadium, Thurles
	J Deane 0-9, A Browne 1-1, S McGrath 1-0, K Morrison 0-3, F McCormack 0-1, M Daly 0-1.		J O'Connor 0-3, D Forde 0-2, PJ O'Connell 0-2, O Baker 0-1, C Clancy 0-1, N Gilligan 0-1.	Attendance: 38,661; Referee: D Murphy (Wexford)

3 May 1998 Semi-final	Waterford	2-17 - 2-11	Limerick	Semple Stadium, Thurles
	P Flynn 0-9, K McGrath 1-2, M White 1-0, T Browne 0-3, A Kirwan 0-2, F Hartley 0-1.		B Foley 1-3, G Kirby 1-3, M Houlihan 0-2, J Moran 0-2, TJ Ryan 0-1.	Attendance: 38,661; Referee: J Cooney (Galway)

Final

17 May 1998 Final	Cork	2-14 - 0-13	Waterford	Semple Stadium, Thurles
	S O'Farrell 1-3, A Browne 1-0, J Deane 0-3, S McGrath 0-3, K Morrison 0-2, P Ryan 0-2, F McCormack 0-1.	Report	P Flynn 0-5, D Bennett 0-3, A Kirwan 0-2, D Shanahan 0-1, K McGrath 0-1, F Hartley 0-1.	Attendance: 32,890; Referee: A Mac Suibhne (Dublin)

=== Scoring statistics ===
Top scorers overall

Rank	Player	Team	Tally	Total	Matches	Average
1	Joe Deane	Cork	3-30	49	6	8.16
2	Paul Flynn	Waterford	5-31	46	7	6.57
3	Paul Codd	Wexford	1-33	36	5	7.20
4	Jamesie O'Connor	Clare	0-30	30	6	5.00
5	Ken McGrath	Waterford	1-26	29	7	4.14
6	Gary Kirby	Limerick	3-19	28	5	5.60
7	David Cuddy	Laois	1-22	25	5	5.00
8	Eamon Morrissey	Dublin	6-6	24	5	4.80
9	Eugene O'Neill	Tipperary	0-20	20	4	5.00
10	Niall Moloney	Galway	2-13	19	4	4.75
10	Francis Forde	Galway	1-16	19	4	4.75

Top scorers in a single game

Rank	Player	Team	Tally	Total	Opposition
1	Darragh Coen	Galway	0-12	12	Clare
2	Francis Forde	Galway	1-08	11	Offaly
3	Paul Flynn	Waterford	2-04	10	Laois
3	Paul Codd	Wexford	1-07	10	Tipperary
3	Jamesie O'Connor	Clare	0-10	10	Antrim
6	Paul Flynn	Waterford	1-06	9	Tipperary
6	Niall Moloney	Kilkenny	1-06	9	Tipperary
6	Paul Codd	Wexford	0-09	9	Laois
6	Joe Deane	Cork	0-09	9	Clare
6	Paul Flynn	Waterford	0-09	9	Limerick

== Division 2 ==
National Hurling League Division 2
- Season: 1998
- Champions: Kerry; 5th Division 2 title
- Promoted: Down
- Relegated: Armagh; Louth
- All statistics correct as of 10 March 2017.

The league saw a major restructuring of the usual four divisions of eight teams. Division 2 was split into Group 2A and Group 2B with each group consisting of seven teams. The top two teams in each group qualified for the knock-out stage.

Armagh, Carlow, Derry, Down, Kildare, Louth, Monaghan, Roscommon, Tyrone and Wicklow all entered Division 1 as part of the restructuring.

On 25 July 1998, Kerry won the title after a 1–11 to 2–6 win over Westmeath in a replay of the final. It was their 5th Division 2 league title overall and their first since 1967-68.

=== Division 2A table ===
Pos	Team	Pld	W	D	L	F	A	Diff	Pts	Notes
1	Carlow	6	5	0	1	17-88	5-52	72	10	
2	Kerry	6	5	0	1	17-99	5-71	64	10	Division 2 champions
3	Derry	6	4	0	2	13-73	5-64	33	8	
4	Wicklow	6	4	0	2	4-84	8-51	21	8	
5	Monaghan	6	2	0	4	6-40	18-82	-78	4	
6	Roscommon	6	1	0	5	12-53	8-68	-3	2	
7	Armagh	6	0	0	6	2-41	22-90	-109	0	

=== Division 2B table ===
Pos	Team	Pld	W	D	L	F	A	Diff	Pts	Notes
1	Down	6	6	0	0	20-100	6-39	103	12	
2	Westmeath	6	5	0	1	21-80	7-38	84	10	Division 2 runners-up
3	London	5	3	0	2	7-56	9-50	0	6	
4	Meath	6	2	0	4	12-69	10-60	15	4	
5	Kildare	6	2	0	4	5-54	14-65	-28	4	
6	Tyrone	6	2	0	4	6-40	18-89	-85	4	
7	Louth	6	0	0	6	9-28	16-96	-89	0	

=== Knock-out stage ===
Semi-finals

1 June 1998 Semi-final	Westmeath	4-8 - 1-11	Carlow	O'Connor Park, Tullamore

13 June 1998 Semi-final	Kerry	2-14 - 1-12	Down	O'Moore Park, Portlaoise

Finals

11 July 1998 Final	Kerry	2-8 - 2-8	Westmeath	MacDonagh Park, Nenagh
				Referee: J McDonnell (Tipperary)

25 July 1998 Final replay	Kerry	1-11 - 2-6	Westmeath	MacDonagh Park, Nenagh

== Division 3 ==
Pos	Team	Pld	W	D	L	F	A	Diff	Pts	Notes
1	Cavan	6	5	1	0	12-40	4-36	48	11	Division 3 runners-up
2	Mayo	6	5	0	1	14-79	10-26	65	10	Division 3 champions
3	Leitrim	6	3	1	2	5-41	9-51	-22	7	
4	Longford	6	3	0	3	10-57	7-51	15	6	
5	Fermanagh	6	3	0	3	6-52	2-58	6	6	
6	Sligo	6	1	0	5	6-30	13-79	-70	2	
7	Donegal	6	0	0	6	5-38	13-66	-52	0	

=== Knock-out stage ===
Final

16 May 1998 Final	Mayo	2-12 - 1-8	Cavan
