= Brendan O'Leary (hurler) =

Wexford hurler

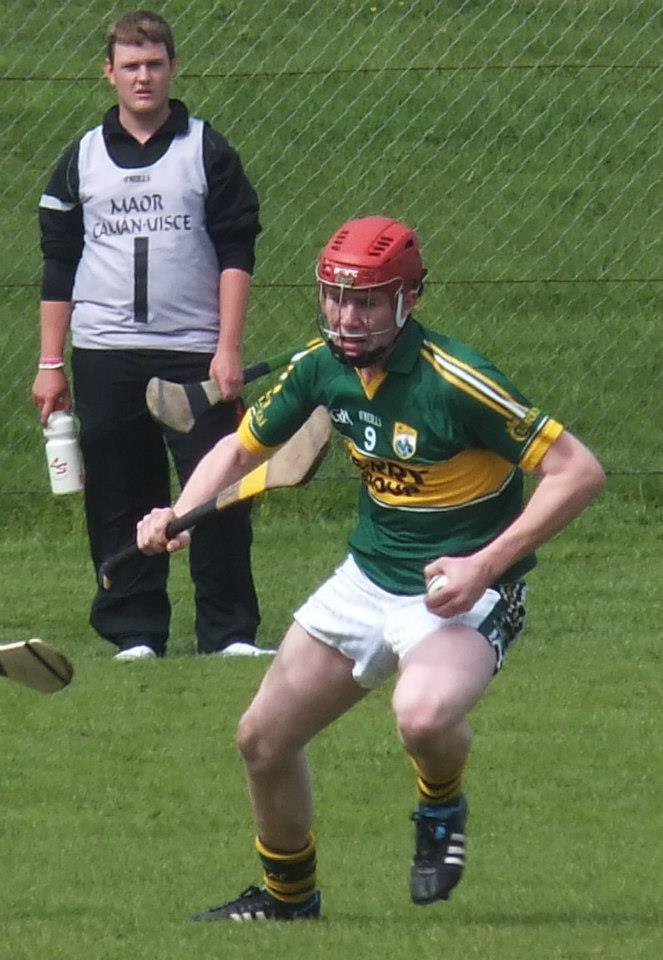
- Brendan O'Leary in full flow

Personal information
- Native name: Breandán Ó Laoire (Irish)
- Born: Rathnure, County Wexford

Sport
- Sport: Hurling
- Position: Full-back
Club
- Years: Club
- ?–: Rathnure
Inter-county
- Years: County
- 2008–2011: Wexford
Inter-county titles
- All-Irelands: 0

Brendan O'Leary is an Irish sportsman who was a member of the Wexford senior hurling team from 2008 to 2011. He plays his club hurling for Rathnure.

== References and external links ==
- Forde, Gerry. "Wexford Echo: Oulart Stave off Rathnure to Stay on Course for Historic Hat-trick." Wexford Echo | Wexford News | Wexford Sport. 30 Oct. 2008. Web. 18 Oct. 2010. (link).
- "Goal-hero Higgins Hits Clincher for Rathnure." Enniscorthy Echo | Enniscorthy News | Enniscorthy Sport. 5 Aug. 2010. Web. 18 Oct. 2010. (link).
- O'Sullivan, Jim. "Irish Examiner - 2002/11/18: DJ Magic Tops for Young Irelands." TCH Archives. 18 Nov. 2002. Web. 18 Oct. 2010. (link).
- "RTÉ Sport: Wexford 2–13 Dublin 0–19." RTÉ Ireland's National Television and Radio Broadcaster. 14 June 2008. Web. 18 Oct. 2010. (link).
