= Brendan Landers =

Irish hurler

Personal information
- Native name: Breandán de Londras (Irish)
- Born: 25 January 1978 (age 48) Lismore, County Waterford, Ireland
- Height: 5 ft 10 in (178 cm)

Sport
- Sport: Hurling
- Position: Goalkeeper
Club
- Years: Club
- Lismore
Club titles
- Waterford titles: 0
Inter-county*
Years	County	Apps (scores)
1997-2002	Waterford	11 (0-00)
Inter-county titles
- Munster titles: 0
- All-Irelands: 0
- NHL: 0
- All Stars: 0
- *Inter County team apps and scores correct as of 20:20, 24 April 2016.

Brendan Landers (born 25 January 1978) is an Irish retired hurler who played as a goalkeeper for the Waterford senior team.

Born in Lismore, County Waterford, Landers first played competitive hurling in his youth. He was a Harty Cup runner-up with Lismore CBS while simultaneously enjoying championship success at under-age levels with the Lismore club. Landers subsequently joined the Lismore senior team.

Landers made his debut on the inter-county scene when he first linked up with the Waterford minor team. A Munster runner-up in this grade, he later lined out with the under-21 team. Landers joined the senior team during the 1997 Waterford Crystal League. He went on to play a key role for Waterford as goalkeeper.

As a member of the unsuccessful Munster inter-provincial team in 1998, Landers never won a Railway Cup medal. Throughout his inter-county career he made 11 championship appearances. Landers retired from inter-county hurling prior to the start of the 2002 league.

In retirement from playing Landers became involved in club management and coaching, including a spell as manager of the Lismore camogie team.
