= Geoffrey McGonagle =

Personal information
- Nickname: Big Geoffrey
- Born: 26 September 1974 (age 52) Dungiven, County Londonderry, Northern Ireland
- Height: 5 ft 11 in (180 cm)

Sport
- Football Position: Forward
- Hurling Position: Forward
Clubs
- Years: Club
- Dungiven (F); Kevin Lynch's (H)
Club titles
	Football	Hurling
Derry titles	2	?
Ulster titles	1	-
Inter-county
- Years: County
- 1994-2000s 1990s-2000: Derry (F); Derry (H)
Inter-county titles
	Football	Hurling
Ulster Titles	1	2
League titles		-

Geoffrey McGonagle (born 26 September 1974) is a dual player of Gaelic games who played Gaelic football and hurling for Derry in the 1990s and 2000s.

McGonagle played club football for St Canice's Dungiven and club hurling for Kevin Lynch's.

Former team-mate Joe Brolly said "first and foremost he was a great entertainer and character."

In football, he played as a forward. For a big player he has extraordinary co-ordination and hand speed. He is also famed for his ability to dummy players. Brolly said "there were many times when you could only marvel at his wizardry". Brolly says when McGonagle "was on his game, there wasn't a footballer in the country who could have laced his boots" and described him as a scoring machine.

He also played in the forward line in hurling.

== Personal life ==
McGonagle is from Dungiven. He went to primary school at St Canice's in Dungiven and secondary school at St. Pat's College in Maghera.

== Football career ==
=== Club ===
McGonagle won the Ulster Minor Club Football Championship with Dungiven in 1990. He started playing for Dungiven Seniors while aged just 15. He was part of the Dungiven side that won the 1991 Derry Senior Football Championship - beating Newbridge in the final. Dungiven reached the final again in 1996, but were defeated by Bellaghy.

McGonagle won another Derry Championship medal in 1997, this time Dungiven beat Castledawson in the final. They also went on to win the Ulster Senior Club Football Championship that year, with victory over Errigal Ciarán in the decider.

In 2008 in the twilight of his career McGonagle played as a goalkeeper for Dungiven.

=== Inter-county ===
McGonagle was part of the Derry Minor team from a young age and won the 1990 Ulster Minor Football Championship with the county - beating Down in the final.

He made his Senior debut in 1994 against Down in the National League. In 1995 he won the National League with Derry, and another the following year.

McGonagle helped Derry win the 1998 Ulster Senior Football Championship. In the final against Donegal, he set up fellow-Dungiven man Joe Brolly for the decisive goal late in the game. Derry beat Meath in the 2000 National League final, giving McGonagle another League medal.

=== School ===
McGonagle had a successful school career winning seven Ulster College titles in football and hurling, including the Hogan Cup in 1990.

== Hurling career ==
=== Club ===
McGonagle has won the Derry Senior Hurling Championship with Kevin Lynch's on at least 6 occasions. The club also reached the Ulster Senior Club Hurling Championship final in 2003, 2006 and 2007, but were beaten each time.

=== Inter-county ===
McGonagle won one/two? Ulster Minor Hurling Championships with the Derry Minor team. He also won one/two? Ulster Senior Hurling Championships with the county in 2000?? and 2001. McGonagle produced a "brilliant performance" in the 2001 decider against Antrim scoring 1-08.

He retired from inter-county hurling in June 2005 after exiting the Ulster Championship. He later returned.
