= Dan Dooley =

Irish hurler

Daniel Dooley
Personal information
- Native name: Dónall Ó Dúlaoich (Irish)
- Born: 28 June 1990 (age 36) Rathcormac, County Cork, Ireland
- Height: 5 ft 11 in (180 cm)

Sport
- Sport: Hurling
- Position: Left wing-forward
Club*
Years	Club	Apps (scores)
2008-present	Bride Rovers	33 (9-57)
Club titles
- Cork titles: 0
College
- Years: College
- Cork Institute of Technology
College titles
- Fitzgibbon titles: 0
Inter-county**
Years	County	Apps (scores)
2018-present	Cork	0 (0-00)
Inter-county titles
- Munster titles: 0
- All-Irelands: 0
- NHL: 0
- All Stars: 0
- * club appearances and scores correct as of 16:44, 22 April 2019. **Inter County team apps and scores correct as of 16:44, 16 February 2019.

Daniel Dooley (born 28 June 1990) is an Irish hurler who plays for Cork Senior Championship club Bride Rovers and at inter-county level with the Cork senior hurling team. He usually lines out as a left wing-forward.

== Playing career ==
=== St. Colman's College ===
On 28 November 2008, Dooley scored 1-02 from full-forward when St. Colman's College defeated Coláiste Chríost Rí by 4–15 to 2–13 to win the Dr. O'Callaghan Cup.

=== Cork Institute of Technology ===
On 1 March 2014, Dooley was at full-forward on the Cork Institute of Technology team that faced the Waterford Institute of Technology in the final of the Fitzgibbon Cup. He was held scoreless throughout the game which resulted in a 0–17 to 0–12 victory for the Waterford team.

=== Bride Rovers ===
Dooley joined the Bride Rovers club at a young age and played in all grades at juvenile and underage levels, enjoying divisional and county championship success in the under-12 and minor grades.

On 28 September 2008, Dooley was a substitute when Bride Rovers faced Sarsfields in the final of the Cork Senior Championship. He remained on the bench for the entire game which Bride Rovers lost by 2–14 to 2–13.

=== Cork ===
Dooley was added to the Cork senior hurling panel in November 2018. He made his first appearance on 24 February 2019 and scored two points from left wing-forward in Cork's 2–21 to 1-21 National Hurling League defeat of Limerick.

== Career statistics ==
=== Club ===
As of match played 20 April 2019.

Team	Year	Cork SHC	
Team	Year	Apps	Score
Bride Rovers	2008	0	0-00
Bride Rovers	2009	4	1-06
Bride Rovers	2010	4	1-02
Bride Rovers	2011	4	3-06
Bride Rovers	2012	4	0-05
Bride Rovers	2013	3	0-04
Bride Rovers	2014	2	1-03
Bride Rovers	2015	2	2-03
Bride Rovers	2016	3	0-06
Bride Rovers	2017	3	1-11
Bride Rovers	2018	3	0-10
Bride Rovers	2019	1	0-01
Career total		33	9-57

=== Inter-county ===
As of match played 16 March 2019.

Team	Year	National League			Munster		All-Ireland		Total	
Team	Year	Division	Apps	Score	Apps	Score	Apps	Score	Apps	Score
Cork	2019	Division 1A	2	0-02	0	0-00	0	0-00	2	0-02
Career total			2	0-02	0	0-00	0	0-00	2	0-02

== Honours ==
St. Colman's College

- Dr. O'Callaghan Cup (1): 2008
