= Alan Cadogan =

Irish hurler

Personal information
- Native name: Ailéin Ó Ceadagáin (Irish)
- Born: 17 May 1993 (age 33) Douglas, Cork, Ireland
- Occupation: Secondary school teacher
- Height: 5 ft 10 in (178 cm)

Sport
- Sport: Hurling
- Position: Right corner-forward
Club*
Years	Club	Apps (scores)
2011-present	Douglas	46 (10-153)
Club titles
- Cork titles: 0
College
- Years: College
- 2012-2015: University College Cork
College titles
- Fitzgibbon titles: 0
Inter-county**
Years	County	Apps (scores)
2014-2023	Cork	24 (3-54)
Inter-county titles
- Munster titles: 2
- All-Irelands: 0
- NHL: 0
- All Stars: 0
- * club appearances and scores correct as of 21:33, 8 September 2024. **Inter County team apps and scores correct as of 22:04, 31 July 2021.

Alan Cadogan (born 17 May 1993) is an Irish hurler who plays for Cork Senior Championship club Douglas and previously at inter-county level with the Cork senior hurling team. He usually lines out as a right corner-forward.

== Playing career ==
=== Douglas ===
Cadogan joined the Douglas club at a young age and played in all grades at juvenile and underage levels. He enjoyed championship success in the under-14 and under-16 grades.

On 11 June 2011, Cadogan made his senior championship debut for Douglas when he came on as a 54th-minute substitute in a 0–09 to 1–14 defeat by Blackrock in the Cork Senior Championship.

=== Cork ===
==== Minor and under-21 ====
Cadogan first played for Cork as a dual player at minor level. He made his first appearance for the Cork minor football team on 13 April 2011 in a 2–10 to 0–11 defeat of Clare in the Munster Championship. Cadogan made his debut with the Cork minor hurling team two weeks later in a 2–14 to 0–12 defeat by Limerick in the Munster Championship. On 3 July, he was at left corner-forward when the Cork minor football team suffered a 3–11 to 1–09 defeat by Tipperary in the Munster final.

On 11 April 2012, Cadogan made his first appearance for the Cork under-21 football team. He came on as a substitute for Mark Sugrue in the 2–12 to 1-14 Munster Championship final defeat of Kerry.

On 9 April 2011, Cadogan won his second Munster Championship medal when the Cork under-21 football team defeated Tipperary by 1–17 to 0–09 in the final. On 4 May, he scored a point from right wing-forward when Cork suffered a 1–14 to 1–11 defeat by Galway in the All-Ireland final. Cadogan became a dual player in the under-21 grade on 17 July when he lined out for the Cork under-21 hurling team in their 5–19 to 2–13 defeat by Tipperary in the Munster Championship.

Cadogan won a third successive Munster Championship medal with the Cork under-21 football team on 9 April 2014 when he scored five points from play in the 1–18 to 3–08 defeat of Tipperary in the final. On 30 July, he was held scoreless at full-forward when the Cork under-21 hurling team suffered a 1–28 to 1–13 defeat by Clare in the Munster Championship final.

==== Senior ====
Cadogan made his first appearance for the Cork senior hurling team on 15 February 2014 in a 0-17 apiece draw with Limerick in the National Hurling League. He was later included on Cork's panel for the 2014 Munster Championship and made his debut on 25 May in a 1-21 apiece draw with Waterford, in which he was also named man of the match. On 3 July, Cadogan won a Munster Championship medal after scoring four points in Cork's 2–24 to 0–24 defeat of Limerick in the last final to be played at the old Páirc Uí Chaoimh. He ended the season by being nominated for an All-Star.

On 3 May 2015, Cadogan was at right corner-forward in Cork's 1–24 to 0–17 defeat by Waterford in the National League final.

Cadogan won his second Munster Championship medal on 9 July 2017 after scoring 1-04 from play in the 1–25 to 1–20 defeat of Clare in the final. He ended the season by securing a second All-Star nomination.

On 24 May 2018, it was reported that Cadogan would miss the Munster Championship after he underwent surgery on his knee the previous week. He returned to the extended panel and wore the number 27 jersey for Cork's All-Ireland semi-final defeat by Limerick on 29 July.

On 16 February 2019, Cadogan played his first game for Cork in eleven months when he came on as a 58th-minute substitute for Jamie Coughlan in Cork's 1–20 to 0-20 National League defeat of Clare. He ended the year by receiving a third All-Star nomination.

On 3 October 2023, Cadogan announced his retirement from inter-county hurling.

=== Munster ===
Cadogan was added to the Munster inter-provincial team during the 2016 Inter-provincial Championship. He made his only appearance for the team on 15 December 2016 when he came on as a half-time substitute for Brendan Maher and collected a Railway Cup medal following the 2–20 to 2–16 defeat of Leinster.

== Coaching career ==
=== St. Francis College ===
On 16 February 2019, Cadogan was part of the coaching team when St. Francis College qualified for the final of the Tom Collum Cup. A 1–13 to 0-14 of Hamilton High School secured the title.

== Career statistics ==
=== Club ===
As of 7 September 2025

Team	Year	Cork PSHC	
Team	Year	Apps	Score
Douglas	2011	3	0-03
Douglas	2012	2	0-02
Douglas	2013	4	1-14
Douglas	2014	5	3-19
Douglas	2015	2	1-06
Douglas	2016	5	0-25
Douglas	2017	3	1-10
Douglas	2018	1	0-06
Douglas	2019	2	1-05
Douglas	2020	4	1-18
Douglas	2021	4	0-08
Douglas	2022	4	0-11
Douglas	2023	4	1-10
Douglas	2024	3	1-16
Douglas	2025	3	0-08
Total		49	10-161

=== Inter-county ===
As of 5 February 2022.

Team	Year	National League			Munster		All-Ireland		Total	
Team	Year	Division	Apps	Score	Apps	Score	Apps	Score	Apps	Score
Cork	2014	Division 1B	5	0-08	4	0-11	1	0-01	10	0-20
Cork	2015	Division 1A	7	0-06	1	0-02	3	0-02	11	0-10
Cork	2016	Division 1A	4	0-02	1	0-03	2	1-06	7	1-11
Cork	2017	Division 1A	5	0-11	3	1-08	1	0-02	9	1-21
Cork	2018	Division 1A	5	0-07	—		—		5	0-07
Cork	2019	Division 1A	1	0-00	3	1-09	2	0-09	6	1-18
Cork	2020	Division 1A	1	0-04	1	0-01	0	0-00	2	0-05
Cork	2021	Division 1A	4	1-07	1	0-00	3	0-04	8	1-11
Cork	2022	Division 1A	1	0-01	0	0-00	0	0-00	1	0-01
Career total			33	1-46	14	2-34	12	1-24	59	4-104

== Honours ==
=== Player ===
University College Cork

- All-Ireland Freshers Hurling Championship (1): 2013
- Canon O'Brien Cup (1): 2017

Cork

- Munster Senior Hurling Championship (2): 2014, 2017
- Munster Under-21 Football Championship (3): 2012, 2013, 2014

Munster

- Railway Cup (1): 2016

=== Coach ===
St. Francis College

- Tom Cullum Cup (1): 2019
