= Ray Ryan (hurler) =

Cork player (1981–2025)

Personal information
- Native name: Réamonn Ó Riain (Irish)
- Born: 18 November 1981 Glanmire, County Cork, Ireland
- Died: 25 February 2025 (aged 43) Glanmire, County Cork, Ireland
- Occupation: Garda

Sport
- Sport: Hurling
- Position: Left wing-back
Club
- Years: Club
- 2000–2017: Sarsfields
Club titles
- Cork titles: 4
Inter-county
Years	County	Apps (scores)
2009–2011	Cork	4 (0–0)
Inter-county titles
- Munster titles: 0
- All-Irelands: 0
- NHL: 0
- All Stars: 0

Raymond Ryan (18 November 1981 – 25 February 2025) was an Irish hurler. At club level, he played with Sarsfields and at inter-county level with the Cork senior hurling team. Ryan captained the squad called up by Gerald McCarthy to replace the striking 2008 panel.

== Career ==
After progressing through the juvenile and underage ranks with the Sarsfields club, Ryan made his senior team debut in 2000. He claimed his first silverware in 2008, when Sarsfields won the Cork SHC title after beating Bride Rovers by 2–14 to 2–13 in the final. Ryan claimed further Cork SHC titles in 2010, 2012 and 2014. He won an East Cork JAHC medal with the club's junior team in 2016, before ending his senior team career in 2017.

Ryan first appeared on the inter-county scene with Cork when he was part of the extended training panel in 2007; however, he did not make the final panel. Two years later, he was one of a number of players called up by team manager Gerald McCarthy to replace the 2008 Cork panel who refused to play under his management. Ryan was named team captain and made a number of appearances in the National Hurling League. He was retained on the panel when the striking players returned, and continued to line out with Cork until 2011.

Ryan was also selected for Munster in the Railway Cup, and was one of only two Cork players on the panel in February 2009.

== Personal life and death ==
His brother Pat was part of Cork's All-Ireland SHC-winning team in 1999, before later serving as manager of the Cork under-20 and senior teams. Ryan was a member of the Garda Síochána and was stationed in Cobh.

Ryan died on 25 February 2025, at the age of 43.

== Honours ==
Sarsfields

- Cork Senior Hurling Championship: 2008, 2010, 2012, 2014
- East Cork Junior A Hurling Championship: 2016
