= Pat Ryan (Cork hurler) =

Irish hurling manager and coach

Personal information
- Native name: Pádraig Ó Riain (Irish)
- Born: 23 July 1976 (age 50) Glanmire, County Cork, Ireland
- Occupation: Pfizer employee
- Height: 5 ft 10 in (178 cm)

Sport
- Sport: Hurling
- Position: Midfield
Club*
Years	Club	Apps (scores)
1995–2011	Sarsfields	64 (4–243)
Club titles
- Cork titles: 2
College
- Years: College
- Regional Technical College, Cork
College titles
- Fitzgibbon titles: 0
Inter-county**
Years	County	Apps (scores)
1997–2003	Cork	11 (0–12)
Inter-county titles
- Munster titles: 2
- All-Irelands: 1
- NHL: 1
- All Stars: 0
- * club appearances and scores correct as of 14:27, 22 July 2018. **Inter County team apps and scores correct as of 20:43, 21 July 2018.

Patrick Ryan (born 23 July 1976) is an Irish hurling manager, coach, selector and former player. He usually played at midfield for club side Sarsfields and at inter-county level with the Cork senior hurling team.

Ryan first played competitive hurling at colleges level with the North Monastery, winning an All-Ireland medal in 1994. His inter-county career with Cork spanned eight seasons, beginning as a member of the under-21 team in 1996, with whom he won an All-Ireland medal. After joining the Cork senior team in 1997, Ryan won an All-Ireland medal in 1999, as well as Munster and National League titles. As a player with the Sarsfields club, he won two county championship medals.

As a manager, coach and selector, Ryan has guided the Sarsfields club to two county championship titles, while he also helped the Cork senior team to two Munster titles in 2017 and 2025.

== Playing career ==
=== The North Monastery ===
Ryan first came to prominence as a hurler with the North Monastery. Having played at every grade, by 1994 he was a forward on the college's senior team that defeated Midleton CBS by 1–09 to 0–04 in the Harty Cup final. On 24 April 1994, Ryan won an All-Ireland medal following a 1–10 to 1–06 defeat of St Mary's College from Galway.

=== Sarsfields ===
Ryan joined the Sarsfields club at a young age and played in all grades at juvenile and underage levels. He made his championship debut for the club's senior team in a 1–13 to 1–06 defeat of Blackrock on 10 June 1995.

On 5 October 1997, Ryan lined out at midfield in his first senior championship final. In spite of being the game's top scorer with 1-07, Ryan's side were beaten by Imokilly by 1–18 to 2-12. He finished the championship as the top scorer with 1-47.

On 28 September 2008, Ryan was once again at midfield when Sarsfields qualified for the championship final. He scored six points in a 2–14 to 2–13 defeat of Bride Rovers to claim his first championship medal.

After losing the 2009 final to Newrtownshandrum, Sarsfields were back in a third successive decider on 10 October 2010. Ryan was introduced as a late substitute in the 1–17 to 0–18 defeat of Glen Rovers.

=== Cork ===
==== Under-21 ====
Ryan made his first appearance for the Cork under-21 team on 18 July 1996, replacing John Browne for the final 12 minutes of a Munster Championship semi-final defeat of Tipperary at Páirc Uí Chaoimh. He was an unused substitute when Cork won the subsequent Munster final following a 3–16 to 2–07 defeat of Clare.

Ryan became a regular member of the starting fifteen for the 1997 championship, first at right wing-back before later taking a midfield position. On 30 July 1997, Ryan scored a point in Cork's 1–11 to 0–13 defeat of Tipperary in the Munster final. He later won an All-Ireland medal and was named man of the match after Cork defeated Galway by 3–11 to 0–13 in the final.

==== Senior ====
On 20 November 1997, Ryan made his senior debut for Cork in a 2–15 to 0–15 defeat of Waterford in the Oireachtas Cup before becoming a regular member of the team during the 1998 National League. On 17 May 1998, he won a National League medal after Cork's 2–14 to 0–13 defeat of Waterford. Ryan made his championship debut at midfield on 31 May 1998 in a 1–20 to 3-11 Munster Championship quarter-final defeat of Limerick.

After making a number of appearances in Cork's unsuccessful National League campaign in 1999, Ryan was dropped from the starting fifteen for the Munster Championship. On 4 July 1999, he was introduced as a substitute in Cork's 1–15 to 0-14 Munster final defeat of Clare, in what was his only championship appearance of the season. On 12 September 1999, Ryan was an unused substitute when Cork defeated Kilkenny by 0–13 to 0–12 in the All-Ireland final.

In 2000, Ryan was back on the starting fifteen for Cork's first two championship games. He was dropped from the team for the subsequent Munster final on 3 July 2000, however, he was introduced as a substitute and won a second successive Munster medal after a 0–23 to 3–12 defeat of Tipperary.

Ryan played his last game for Cork in a 4–12 to 1–07 defeat of Blackrock in a challenge match on 7 January 2003.

== Management and coaching career ==
=== Sarsfields ===
In December 2011, Ryan was appointed manager of the Sarsfields senior hurling team. In his debut season in charge he succeeded in guiding the team to the championship final. After trailing Bishopstown early in the second half, Sarsfields went on to win by 1–15 to 1-14.

Sarsfields failed to retain the title in 2013 after suffering a two-point defeat by Midleton in the final, however, Ryan guided the team to a third successive final on 12 October 2014 and a 2–18 to 0–08 defeat of Glen Rovers.

=== Cork ===
==== Senior (coach) ====
In 2015, Ryan ruled himself out as a candidate to succeed Jimmy Barry-Murphy as manager of the Cork senior hurling team. In spite of this, he was later added to Kieran Kingston's management team as a selector. Ryan was appointed coach of the team in September 2016 following the departure of Frank Flannery. On 9 July 2017, Ryan helped guide Cork to the Munster title following a 1–25 to 1–20 defeat of Clare in the final. Following the departure of Kingston as manager at the end of the 2017 season, Ryan ruled himself out of contention for the job stating: "I will not be allowing my name to go forward for consideration. There are a number of reasons for that, mainly the age profile of my children and work commitments." Ryan was also named as a possible successor to Derek McGrath as manager of the Waterford senior hurling team but also ruled himself out of the running.

==== Under-20 ====
On 1 October 2019, Ryan was ratified as manager of the Cork under-20 hurling team.

==== Senior (manager) ====
On 7 July 2022, Ryan was ratified as manager of the Cork senior hurling team. In 2023 Ryan's first season as manager Cork failed to make it out of the Munster Championship group stage. In 2024 Cork deprived Limerick of the unique feat of a fifth All Ireland title in a row after a thrilling victory in the all Ireland semi final. This was Cork's second championship victory over Limerick with Cork also beating Limerick earlier during the season in the Munster Championship. Cork then went on to lose a classic All Ireland Final to Clare by one point after extra time. In 2025 Ryan managed Cork to their first National Hurling League title since 1998 after Cork comfortably beat arch rivals Tipperary in the final. In the championship Cork under Pat Ryan won a memorable Munster final against Limerick in the Gaelic Grounds after extra time and a penalty shootout. Ryan and Cork then went on to lose an all Ireland final for a second consecutive year to Tipperary, in a dismal performance with Cork only scoring two points in the second half after leading by six points at half-time.

== Career statistics ==
=== Club ===
Team	Season	Cork		Munster		All-Ireland		Total	
Team	Season	Apps	Score	Apps	Score	Apps	Score	Apps	Score
Sarsfields	1995-96	2	0-00	—		—		2	0-00
Sarsfields	1996-97	3	0-08	—		—		3	0-08
Sarsfields	1997-98	6	1-47	2	2-11	—		8	3-58
Sarsfields	1998-99	2	0-07	—		—		2	0-07
Sarsfields	1999-00	1	0-03	—		—		1	0-03
Sarsfields	2000-01	2	0-05	—		—		2	0-05
Sarsfields	2001-02	4	0-08	—		—		4	0-08
Sarsfields	2002-03	5	0-03	—		—		5	0-03
Sarsfields	2003-04	6	0-30	—		—		6	0-30
Sarsfields	2004-05	2	0-04	—		—		2	0-04
Sarsfields	2005-06	2	0-04	—		—		2	0-04
Sarsfields	2006-07	5	0-19	—		—		5	0-19
Sarsfields	2007-08	2	0-12	—		—		2	0-12
Sarsfields	2008-09	5	0-29	2	0-20	—		7	0-49
Sarsfields	2009-10	5	1-31	—		—		5	1-31
Sarsfields	2010-11	6	0-01	1	0-00	—		7	0-01
Sarsfields	2011-12	1	0-01	—		—		1	0-01
Total		59	2-212	5	2-31	—		64	4-243

=== Inter-county ===
Team	Year	National League			Munster		All-Ireland		Total	
Team	Year	Division	Apps	Score	Apps	Score	Apps	Score	Apps	Score
Cork	1998	Division 1B	7	0-12	2	0-03	—		9	0-15
Cork	1999	Division 1B	6	0-05	1	0-00	0	0-00	7	0-05
Cork	2000	Division 1B	5	0-09	3	0-07	1	0-01	9	0-17
Cork	2001	Division 1B	3	0-02	1	0-01	—		4	0-03
Cork	2002	Division 1B	6	0-02	1	0-00	2	0-00	9	0-02
Total			27	0-30	8	0-11	3	0-01	38	0-42

== Honours ==
=== As a player ===
North Monastery

- All-Ireland Senior Colleges' Hurling Championship (1): 1994
- Munster Senior Colleges' Hurling Championship (1): 1994

Sarsfields

- Cork Senior Hurling Championship (2): 2008, 2010

Cork

- All-Ireland Senior Hurling Championship (1): 1999
- Munster Senior Hurling Championship (2): 1999, 2000
- National Hurling League (1): 1998
- All-Ireland Under-21 Hurling Championship (1): 1997
- Munster Under-21 Hurling Championship (2): 1996, 1997

=== In management ===
Sarsfields

- Cork Senior Hurling Championship (2): 2012, 2014

Cork

- Munster Senior Hurling Championship (2): 2017, 2025
- National Hurling League (1): 2025
- All-Ireland Under-20 Hurling Championship: 2020, 2021
- Munster Under-20 Hurling Championship : 2020, 2021

Sporting positions
Preceded by Denis Ring	Cork under-20 hurling team manager 2019–2021	Succeeded by Donal O'Mahony
Preceded by Kieran Kingston	Cork senior hurling team manager 2022–2025	Succeeded by Vacant
