= 2011 Cork Senior Hurling Championship =

Annual hurling competition season

- Dates: 3 June 2011 – 2 October 2011
- Sponsor: Evening Echo
- Champions: Carrigtwohill (2nd title); Michael Fitzgerald; Brian Lordan (captain); James O'Connor (manager)
- Runners-up: Cork Institute of Technology; Lorcán McLoughlin (captain); Pat Mulcahy (manager)
- Relegated: Ballinhassig

Tournament statistics
- Top scorer(s): Barry Johnson (0-39)

The 2011 Cork Senior Hurling Championship was the 123rd staging of the Cork Senior Hurling Championship since its establishment by the Cork County Board in 1887. The draw for the 2011 opening round fixtures took place on 11 December 2010. The championship proper began on 3 June 2011 and ended on 2 October 2011.

Sarsfields were the defending champions, however, they were defeated by Newtownshandrum in the quarter-finals.

On 20 August 2011, Ballinhassig were relegated from the championship following a 0–12 to 0–13 defeat by Bishopstown.

On 2 October 2011, Carrigtwohill won the championship following a 0–15 to 1–11 defeat of the Cork Institute of Technology in the final. This was their second championship title overall and their first since 1918.

== Format change ==
The format of the 2011 championship was slightly altered due to a decrease in the number of divisional teams taking part. Carrigdhoun, Carbery and Seandún declined to field teams in the championship. The four remaining divisional teams competed in a preliminary round robin, with the top two teams qualifying to meet the two college teams for a place in the championship proper.

== Team changes ==
=== To Championship ===
Promoted from the Cork Premier Intermediate Hurling Championship

- Ballymartle

=== From Championship ===
Relegated to the Cork Premier Intermediate Hurling Championship

- Blarney

== Results ==
=== Divisions/colleges section ===
==== Group table ====
Pos	Team	Pld	W	D	L	SF	SA	Diff	Pts
1	Muskerry	3	2	1	0	5-47	5-41	6	5
2	Imokilly	3	2	0	1	6-46	2-43	15	4
3	Avondhu	3	1	1	1	2-45	4-32	7	3
4	Duhallow	3	0	0	3	4-29	6-51	-28	0
Green background The top two teams advanced to meet University College Cork and the Cork Institute of Technology for a place in the championship proper.

==== Group stage results ====
7 April 2011	Muskerry	2-18 - 3-12	Duhallow	Cloughduv
	M Cremin 1-7, C Murphy 1-3, T Kenny 0-3, J Dineen 0-3, J Crowley 0-1, M O'Sullivan 0-1.		E Brosnan 0-7, L Daly 1-1, J Healy 1-0, A Nash 1-0, N O'Callaghan 0-1, F Broderick 0-1, K Sheahan 0-1, J Ballantyne 0-1.

18 April 2011	Muskerry	1-18 - 1-15	Imokilly	Páirc Uí Rinn, Cork
	D O'Riordan 1-4, M Cremin 0-5, R Doherty 0-2, M O'Sullivan 0-2, T Kenny 0-1, S Sexton 0-1, D O'Sullivan 0-1, D Corkery 0-1, N Buckley 0-1.		L Sexton 1-1, P Regan 0-3, T O'Keeffe 0-3, E Conway 0-3, B Lawton 0-1, C Cronin 0-1, B Cooper 0-1, S Cotter 0-1, J Halbert 0-1.	Referee: C Lane (Banteer)

19 April 2011	Avondhu	1-15 - 0-08	Duhallow	Mallow GAA Complex, Mallow
	P O'Brien 1-1, H O'Gorman 0-4, A O'Brien 0-4, D Flynn 0-2, R Goode 0-2, A Cagney 0-1, J O'Sullivan 0-1.		E Brosnan 0-5, F Broderick 0-1, W Murphy 0-1, L O'Neill 0-1.

25 April 2011	Avondhu	1-14 - 2-11	Muskerry	Mallow GAA Complex, Mallow
	M O'Sullivan 1-3, H O'Gorman 0-6, P O'Brien 0-3, R Goode 0-1, A O'Brien 0-1.		T Kenny 0-4, J Dineen 1-0, M O'Sullivan 1-0, M Cremin 0-2, D O'Riordan 0-2, D Corkery 0-1, N Buckley 0-1, S Sexton 0-1.	Referee: D O'Leary (Watergrasshill)

25 April 2011	Imokilly	3-18 - 1-09	Duhallow	Mallow GAA Complex, Mallow
	J Halbert 2-3, M Spillane 1-3, R Spillane 0-3, K McGann 0-3, A O'Sullivan 0-2, T O'Keeffe 0-1, P O'Regan 0-1, D Tobin 0-1, B Lawton 0-1.		K Sheahan 0-4, L Daly 1-0, A Nash 0-2, P Egan 0-1, J Ballantyne 0-1, K Tarrant 0-1.	Referee: P Downey (Inniscarra)

3 May 2011	Avondhu	0-16 - 2-13	Imokilly	Rathcormac
	H O'Gorman 0-5, A O'Brien 0-4, A Cagney 0-3, P O'Brien 0-1, R Goode 0-1, L Coleman 0-1, J Hutchings 0-1.		R Spillane 2-1, J Halbert 0-5, E Conway 0-3, M Galvin 0-2, C McGann 0-1, D Tobin 0-1.

==== Knock-out stage ====
12 June 2011	Cork Institute of Technology	3-15 - 2-12	Imokilly	Páirc Uí Rinn, Cork
	S O'Brien 2-2, C Casey 1-2, T Murphy 0-3, Ml O'Sullivan 0-3, C Sheehan 0-2, D Drake 0-2, E Dillon 0-1.		B Cooper 1-3, M Galvin 1-1, E Conway 0-4, P O'Regan 0-2, B Ring 0-1, A O'Sullivan 0-1.	Referee: D Kirwan (Éire g)

12 June 2011	Muskerry	2-13 - 0-17	University College Cork	Páirc Uí Rinn, Cork
	P Finnegan 0-5, C Murphy 0-4, R Doherty 1-0, M O'Sullivan 1-0, J Dineen 0-2, M Buckley 0-1, D O'Connell 0-1.		W Griffin 0-6, S Burke 0-4, S Harnedy 0-3, K Keehan 0-2, W Egan 0-2.	Referee: J Dorgan (Nemo Rangers)

=== Round 1 ===
3 June 2011 Round 1	Glen Rovers	2-21 - 1-08	Killeagh	Clonmult Memorial Park, Midleton
	P Horgan 1-9, D Brosnan 0-4, E Cronin 1-0, D Cunningham 0-2, G Callinan 0-2, R Whitty 0-2, D Coughlan 0-1, S McDonnell 0-1.		J Deane 1-5, A Walsh 0-2, B Barry 0-1.	Referee: D Kirwan (Éire Óg)

3 June 2011 Round 1	Erin's Own	0-17 - 2-16	St. Finbarr's	Páirc Uí Chaoimh, Cork
	E Murphy 0-10 (8f), S Murphy 0-3, B Clifford 0-2, C O’Connor, A Bowen 0-1 each.	Report	J Fitzpatrick 1-2, C McCarthy 0-4, A Fitzpatrick 1-1, R O’Mahony, R Curran 0-3 each, D O’Leary 0-2, M Ryan 0-1.	Referee: G Harrington (Erin's Own)

3 June 2011 Round 1	Bride Rovers	1-10 - 1-16	Na Piarsaigh	Watergrasshill
	B Johnson 0-9 (0-6 frees, 0-1 65m), S Ryan 1-1.	Report	P Gould 0-11 (0-9 frees), J Gardiner 1-2, J Egan 0-2, A Kenneally 0-1.	Referee: C Lane (Banteer)

4 June 2011 Round 1	Ballinhassig	0-14 - 1-13	Carrigtwohill	Páirc Uí Rinn, Cork
	D O’Callaghan 0-6 (0-3f), D O’Sullivan 0-4 (0-2f), S McCarthy, S Dineen, B Holland, M Coleman (f) 0-1 each.	Report	R White 1-4, M Fitzgerald 0-5, N McCarthy 0-2, B Lordan, T Hogan 0-1 each.	Referee: J Sexton (Ballyhea)

4 June 2011 Round 1	Ballymartle	1-15 - 1-17	Newtownshandrum	Mallow GAA Complex, Mallow
	B O'Dwyer 0-6, Darren McCarthy 0-5, B Corry 1-0, R O'Dwyer 0-2, D O'Dwyer 0-1, K Fitzpatrick 0-1.		B O'Connor 0-7, C Naughton 1-3, M Bowles 0-2, J Coughlan 0-2, D Stack 0-1, J Bowles 0-1, R Clifford 0-1.	Referee: C McAllister (Aghada)

4 June 2011 Round 1	Sarsfields	0-16 - 1-09	Cloyne	Carrigtwohill
	C McCarthy 0-7 (0-5f, 0-1 sideline), R O’Driscoll (1f), E O’Sullivan 0-2 each, D Kearney, K Murphy, D Roche, P Ryan, T Óg Murphy 0-1 each.	Report	D Cahill 0-5 (0-4f), C Cusack 1-1, P O’Sullivan 0-2 (0-1f), J Nyhan 0-1.

10 June 2011 Round 1	Bishopstown	1-09 - 1-11	Midleton	Carrigtwohill
	T Murray 1-6, P Cronin 0-2, E McCarthy 0-1.		S Hennessy 1-3, L O'Farrell 0-3, C Walsh 0-2, P Haughney 0-2, S Moore 0-1.	Referee: E Sheehy (Newcestown)

11 June 2011 Round 1	Douglas	0-09 - 1-14	Blackrock	Páirc Uí Chaoimh, Cork
	R Murphy 0-3 (0-2f); M Harrington 0-2; S Moylan, O Mulrooney, M Collins, B Fitzgerald, 0-1 each.	Report	D Cashman 0-5 (0-3f, 0-1 sideline); B O’Keeffe 1-1; K O’Keefe 0-4; E O’Farrell 0-3; C O’Leary 0-1.	Referee: C McAllister (Aghada)

=== Round 2 ===
11 June 2011 Round 2	Cloyne	2-09 - 1-13	Ballymartle	Páirc Uí Chaoimh, Cork
	P O’Sullivan 1-4 (0-3f); K Dennehy 1-0; D Cahill 0-2; C Smyth, C Cusack, C O’Lomasney, 0-1 each.	Report	Darren McCarthy 0-6 (4f, 1 65); B Corry 0-5; S O’Mahony 1-0; R Dwyer, B Dwyer, 0-1 each.	Referee: J Sexton (Ballyhea)

11 June 2011 Round 2	Bride Rovers	1-12 - 1-18	Erin's Own	Riverstown
	B Johnson 0-8 (6f); K Collins 1-0; C O’Keeffe 0-2; M Collins and J O’Driscoll (1f) 0-1 each.	Report	E Murphy 0-6 (2f); S Murphy 1-2; M O’Connor 0-5; M Carroll 0-2, A Power, S Cronin and M Collins 0-1 each.	Referee: C Lane (Banteer)

20 June 2011 Round 2	Douglas	2-13 - 0-14	Ballinhassig	Páirc Uí Chaoimh, Cork
	S Moylan 0-5, O Mulrooney 1-1, R Murphy 1-0, A Cadogan 0-2, B Fitzgerald 0-2, M Collins 0-1, F Desmond 0-1, M Harrington 0-1.		D O'Sullivan 0-5, D O'Callaghan 0-3, D O'Donovan 0-2, F O'Leary 0-2, S Dineen 0-1, M Coleman 0-1.	Referee: D Kirwan (Éire Óg)

11 July 2011 Round 2	Bishopstown	0-09 - 0-14	Killeagh	Caherlag
	T Murray 0-4 (0-3f), D Crowley, B Murray, M Power, R Conway, P Cronin (0-1f) 0-1 each.		J Deane 0-8 (0-6f, 0-1 ‘65), B Barry 0-3, A Walsh, S Long, E Loughlin 0-1 each.	Referee: D Copps (Ballyhea)

=== Round 3 ===
2 July 2011 Round 3	Cloyne	1-18 - 1-18 (aet)	Ballinhassig	Páirc Uí Rinn, Cork
	P O'Sullivan 0-8, D O'Sullivan 0-4, C Cusack 1-0, J Nyhan 0-2, C O'Sullivan 0-2, E O'Sullivan 0-1, C Smyth 0-1.	Report	D O'Callaghan 0-10, D O'Sullivan 1-1, B Holland 0-4, M Sheehan 0-1, S Dineen 0-1, D Dineen 0-1.

16 July 2011 Round 3	Bishopstown	1-18 - 2-15 (aet)	Bride Rovers	Riverstown
	P Cronin 0-8, D Crowley 1-1, R Conway 0-4, T Murary 0-2, E McCarthy 0-2, M Power 0-1.		S Ryan 2-2, B Johnson 0-8, J Mannix 0-2, P Murphy 0-1, J O'Driscoll 0-1, M Collins 0-1.	Referee: J Sexton (Ballyhea)

24 July 2011 Round 3 replay	Bishopstown	0-11 - 2-10	Bride Rovers	Riverstown
	P Cronin 0-4 (0-2 frees), T Murray 0-4 (0-1 free), R Conway, E McCarthy and M Power 0-1 each.	Report	D Dooley 1-2, B Johnson 0-5 (0-4 frees), J Mannix 1-0, D Burke 0-2, S Ryan 0-1.	Referee: D Copps (Ballyhea)

30 July 2011 Round 3 replay	Cloyne	0-17 - 0-07	Ballinhassig	Páirc Uí Chaoimh, Cork
	Diarmuid O’Sullivan 0-5 (4fs, 1 65), P O’Sullivan 0-4 (2fs), C Cusack 0-3, J Nyhan 0-2, D Cahill, C Smyth, C O’Sullivan 0-1 each.	Report	D Dineen 0-2fs, D O’Callaghan (1f), D Brennan (1 65), M Aherne, P Coomey, S Dineen 0-1 each.	Referee: D Kirwan (Éire Óg)

=== Relegation play-off ===
14 August 2011 Relegation play-off	Bishopstown	2-14 - 1-17	Ballinhassig	Cloughduv
15:30	P Cronin 1-3 (1-0 penalty, 0-1f), B Murray 1-1, T Murray (0-3f), R Conway 0-3 each, I Jones, G McGlacken, M O’Driscoll 0-1 each.	Report	D O’Callaghan 0-5 (0-3f), M Coleman 1-1f, P Coomey 0-3, D Duggan, D Dineen 0-2 each, S McCarthy, D O’Sullivan, D O’Donovan, S Dineen 0-1 each.	Referee: G O’Connell (Lisgoold)

20 August 2011 Relegation play-off replay	Ballinhassig	0-12 - 0-13	Bishopstown	Cloughduv
18:00	M Collins, D Dineen, D O’Callaghan (1f), D O’Sullivan 0-2 each, B Coleman, S McCarthy, D Duggan, M Coleman (free) 0-1 each.	Report	T Murray 0-8 (6frees, 0-1 pen), P Cronin 0-3, G McGlacken 0-2.	Referee: E Sheehy (Newcestown)

=== Fourth round ===
23 July 2011 Fourth round	Killeagh	0-16 - 2-20	Newtownshandrum	Páirc Mac Gearailt, Fermoy
15:00	J Deane 0-7 (0-3 frees), A Walsh 0-3 (0-1 free), S Long and B Barry 0-2 each, E O’Loughlin and D Walsh 0-1 each.	Report	C Naughton 1-2, J Coughlan 0-5, JP King 0-4, M Bowles 1-1 each, J O’Connor and R Clifford 0-3 each, B O’Connor 0-2 (0-1 free), PJ Copse, M Ryan 0-1 each.	Referee: C Lane (Banteer)

23 July 2011 Fourth round	Muskerry	1-10 - 0-16	Carrigtwohill
20:00	P Finnegan 0-5 (0-4 frees); J Crowley 1-0; J Dineen 0-3; R O’Doherty, A O’Mahony 0-1 each.	Report	M Fitzgerald 0-5 (0-4 frees); T Hogan (0-2 frees, 0-2 65s), R White, 0-4 each; D O’Mahony 0-2; N McCarthy 0-1.	Referee: J Dorgan (Nemo Rangers)

24 July 2011 Fourth round	Ballymartle	1-16 - 1-12	St. Finbarr's
17:45	B Dwyer (0-4; 0-2f), B Corry (0-4), J Dwyer (1-0), K Fitzpatrick (0-2), Darren McCarthy (0-2; 0-1f), P Coughlan (0-2), J Coleman), S O’Mahony (0-1), D Dwyer (0-1).	Report	C McCarthy (0-6; 0-2f), A Fitzpatrick (1-0), J Fitzpatrick (0-2), R O’Mahony (0-2), J Neville (0-1f), D O’Leary (0-1).

24 July 2011 Fourth round	Sarsfield's	2-14 - 0-18	Na Piarsaigh	Páirc Uí Chaoimh, Cork
19:30	C McCarthy 1-6 (0-2 sideline, 0-4 frees); M Cussen 1-1; E Martin 0-3; R O’Driscoll 0-2; D Roche and W Kearney 0-1 each.	Report	P Gould 0-9 (0-7 frees); K Buckley and S Duggan 0-2 each; R Healy, J Egan, A Dennehy, S Glasgow and C Ó Caireallain 0-1 each.	Referee: J Sexton (Ballyhea))

30 July 2011 Fourth round	Bride Rovers	2-11 - 1-12	Blackrock	Páirc Uí Chaoimh, Cork
17:30	D Dooley 2-3, B Johnson 0-3 (2fs, 1 65), M Collins, D Burke 0-2 each, S Ryan 0-1.	Report	D Cashman 0-5 (3fs, 1 65), C O’Leary 1-1, K O’Keeffe 0-2, G Norberg, R Dineen, E O’Farrell, B O’Keeffe 0-1 each.	Referee: K Healy (Ballymartle))

7 August 2011 Fourth round	Glen Rovers	2-14 - 3-12	Cloyne	Páirc Uí Chaoimh, Cork
19:15	P Horgan 1-12, 1-0 penalty, 0-7 frees, R Whitty 1-0, D Brosnan and S McDonnell 0-1 each.	Report	P O'Sullivan 0-7, 0-5 frees, C Smyth 1-1, Diarmuid O'Sullivan 1-1, 0-1 free, M Walsh 1-0. C Cusack, D Cahill and C O'Sullivan 0-1 each.	Referee: D Copps (Ballyhea)

9 August 2011 Fourth round	Erin's Own	3-11 - 2-17	Cork Institute of Technology	Páirc Uí Rinn, Cork
19:00	E Murphy 2-5 (1-0 pen, 0-3f), M O’Carroll 1-2, A Bowen, M O’Connor, S Murphy, C Coakley 0-1 each.	Report	L McLoughlin 0-6 (0-4f, 0-1 ’65), T Quaid 0-5 (0-5f), C Casey 1-1, S O’Brien 1-0, M O’Sullivan, A Walsh 0-2 each, D Drake 0-1.	Referee: J Dorgan (Nemo Rangers)

14 August 2011 Fourth round	Douglas	1-11 - 4-16	Midleton	Páirc Uí Chaoimh, Cork
16:00	M Harrington 0-5 (0-4 frees); O Mulrooney 1-1; B Fitzgerald 0-2; R Murphy (free), A Cadogan and S Moylan (free) 0-1 each.	Report	P Haugney 1-5; C Lehane 1-4; S Hennessy 0-4 (0-3 frees, 0-1 ‘65); L O’Farrell and P White 1-0 each; A Ryan, S Farrell and C Walsh 0-1 each.	Referee: J Sexton (Ballyhea)

=== Quarter-finals ===
20 August 2011 Quarter-final	Sarsfield's	0-13 - 1-13	Newtownshandrum	Páirc Mac Gearailt, Fermoy
18:30	C McCarthy 0-5 (1 65), R O’Driscoll (3fs) 0-4, M Cussen 0-2, E Quigley, D Kearney, C O’Sullivan (f) 0-1 each.	Report	C Naughton 1-2, R Clifford 0-4, B O’Connor (1f, 1 65), J Coughlan 0-3 each, J O’Connor, M Bowles, 0-1 each.	Referee: K Healy (Ballymartle)

21 August 2011 Quarter-final	Ballymartle	0-18 - 1-17	Midleton	Páirc Uí Chaoimh, Cork
14:30	B Dwyer 0-8 (0-3f), Darren McCarthy (0-2f), R Dwyer 0-4 each, S O’Mahony, J Kelly 0-1 each.	Report	S Hennessy 0-7 (0-5f), L O’Farrell 1-2, C Walsh 0-4 (0-3f), C Lehane 0-3, P O’Shea 0-1.	Referee: D Copps (Ballyhea)

21 August 2011 Quarter-final	Bride Rovers	2-10 - 1-16	Cork Institute of Technology	Páirc Uí Chaoimh, Cork
16:15	B Johnson 0-6 (0-3f, 0-1 ‘65), M Collins 2-0, D Burke, D Fitzgerald (0-1f), S Ryan, D Dooley 0-1 each.	Report	D Drake 0-4, C Casey 1-0, T Quaid (0-3f), M O’Sullivan 0-3 each, A Walsh (0-1 sideline), L McLoughlin (0-1f, 0-1 ‘65) 0-2 each.	Referee: J Sexton (Ballyhea)

28 August 2011 Quarter-final	Carrigtwohill	1-20 - 3-12	Cloyne	Páirc Uí Chaoimh, Cork
16:00	M Fitzgerald 1-5 (0-3f), T Hogan 0-6 (0-4f, 0-1 ‘65), R White 0-4, N McCarthy 0-3, D O’Mahony, S Kidney 0-1 each.	Report	P O’Sullivan 0-8 (0-5f), C O’Sullivan 1-1, M Walsh, C Smith 1-0 each, C Cusack 0-2, Diarmuid O’Sullivan 0-1.	Referee: J Sexton (Ballyhea)

=== Semi-finals ===
11 September 2011 Semi-final	Cork Institute of Technology	3-15 - 1-7	Newtownshandrum	Páirc Uí Chaoimh, Cork
14:30	T Quaid 1-4 (0-3f), S O’Brien 2-0; L McLoughlin 0-5 (2f, 2 65); D Drake 0-4; J Cronin, C Casey 0-1 each.	Report	R Clifford 1-2; J Coughlan 0-2 (1f); Jerry O’Connor, C Naughton, M Bowles 0-1 each.	Referee: C McAllister (Aghada)

11 September 2011 Semi-final	Midleton	0-10 - 1-10	Carrigtwohill	Páirc Uí Chaoimh, Cork
16:00	C Lehane 0-3; S Hennessy 0-2 (0-2f); S O’Farrell, K Mulcahy, P White, P O’Shea and L O’Farrell 0-1 each.	Report	N McCarthy 0-5; M Fitzgerald 1-2 (0-2f); T Hogan (0-1f), R White and D O’Mahony 0-1 each.	Referee: D Kirwan (Éire Óg)

=== Final ===
2 October 2011 Final	Cork Institute of Technology	1-11 - 0-15	Carrigtwohill	Páirc Uí Chaoimh, Cork
15:45	L McLoughlin 0-5 (0-2f, 0-2 65), C Casey 1-0, J Cronin, D Drake, M O'Sullivan, T Quaid (0-1f), T Murphy (0-f), P O'Connor 0-1 each.	Report	M Fitzgerald 0-6 (0-2f), T Hogan (0-2f 0-1 65), R White 0-3 each, N McCarthy 0-2, S O'Farrell 0-1.	Attendance: 10,004; Referee: C Lyons (Nemo Rangers)

== Championship statistics ==
=== Scoring statistics ===
Top scorers overall

Rank	Player	Club	Tally	Total	Matches	Average
1	Barry Johnson	Bride Rovers	0-39	39	6	6.50
2	Paudie O'Sullivan	Cloyne	1-33	36	6	6.00
3	Thomas Murray	Bishopstown	1-27	30	6	5.00
4	Michael Fitzgerald	Carrigtwohill	2-23	29	5	5.80
5	Patrick Horgan	Glen Rovers	2-21	27	2	13.50
5	Eoghan Murphy	Erin's Own	2-21	27	3	9.00
6	Pa Cronin	Bishopstown	1-21	24	6	4.00
7	Joe Deane	Killeagh	1-20	23	3	7.66
8	Danny O'Callaghan	Ballinhassig	0-22	22	5	4.40
9	Cian McCarthy	Sarsfields	1-18	21	3	7.00

Top scorers in a single game

Rank	Player	Club	Tally	Total	Opposition
1	Patrick Horgan	Glen Rovers	1-12	15	Cloyne
2	Patrick Horgan	Glen Rovers	1-09	12	Killeagh
3	Eoghan Murphy	Erin's Own	2-05	11	CIT
3	Pádraig Gould	Na Piarsaigh	0-11	11	Bride Rovers
4	Mark Cremin	Muskerry	1-07	10	Duhallow
4	Eoghan Murphy	Erin's Own	0-10	10	St. Finbarr's
4	Daniel O'Callaghan	Ballinhassig	0-10	10	Cloyne
5	Dan Dooley	Bride Rovers	2-03	9	Blackrock
5	John Halbert	Imokilly	2-03	9	Duhallow
5	Thomas Murray	Bishopstown	1-06	9	Midleton
5	Cian McCarthy	Sarsfields	1-06	9	Na Piarsaigh
5	Barry Johnson	Bride Rovers	0-09	9	Na Piarsaigh
5	Pádraig Gould	Na Piarsaigh	0-09	9	Sarsfields

=== Miscellaneous ===
- Carrigtwohill win the championship for the first time since 1918. The 93-year gap is the longest gap between successive championship titles.
- Cork Institute of Technology qualify for the championship final for the first time.
