= 2014 Cork Senior Hurling Championship =

Annual hurling competition season

- Dates: 20 April 2014 – 12 October 2014
- Teams: 24
- Sponsor: Evening Echo
- Champions: Sarsfield's (6th title); Tadhg Óg Murphy (captain); Pat Ryan (manager)
- Runners-up: Glen Rovers; Graham Callinan (captain); Richie Kelleher (manager)
- Promoted: Ballyhea
- Relegated: Courcey Rovers

Tournament statistics
- Matches played: 39
- Goals scored: 95 (2.4 per game)
- Points scored: 1121 (28.7 per game))
- Top scorer(s): Cian McCarthy (2-54)

The 2014 Cork Senior Hurling Championship is the 126th staging of the Cork Senior Hurling Championship since its establishment by the Cork County Board in 1887. The championship began on 20 April 2014 and ended on 12 October 2014.

Midleton were the defending champions, however, they were beaten by Douglas in round four. Courcey Rovers were relegated from the championship after three seasons in the top tier. Sarsfield's won the title after a 2–18 to 0–8 defeat of Glen Rovers in the final.

== Team changes ==
=== To Championship ===
Promoted from the Cork Premier Intermediate Hurling Championship

- Youghal

=== From Championship ===
Relegated to the Cork Premier Intermediate Hurling Championship

- Ballinhassig

== Fixtures and results ==
=== Divisions/Colleges ===
20 April 2014 First round	Carrigdhoun	1-19 - 1-12	Duhallow	Coachford
19:00	M Kennefick 0-7 (0-4f), E Collins 1-0, R Walsh 0-3 (0-1f), K Canty 0-3, F O'Leary 0-2, S White 0-2 (0-1 sideline), M O'Riordan and D O'Donovan 0-1 each.		B Sheehy 1-1, L McLoughlin 0-4 (0-3f), A Nash 0-3f, D Hannon 0-2 (0-1f), K Sheahan and S Crowley 0-1 each.	Referee: M Moynihan (Grenagh)

22 April 2014 First round	Muskerry	0-12 - 1-15	Cork Institute of Technology	Ryecourt
19:00	M Cremin 0-3f, C O'Sullivan, T Kenny (0-1f) and M O'Sullivan 0-2 each, C Casey, C Cotter and D Brown 0-1 each.		S Murray 0-9, M O'Sullivian 1-0, K Hallissey 0-3, C Hammersley, P Butler and J Cronin 0-1 each.	Referee: M Maher (St. Finbarr's)

22 April 2014 First round	University College Cork	3-17 - 3-11	Avondhu	Caherlag
	R O'Shea 2-1, W Griffin (0-4f) and S Harnedy 0-5 each, DJ Foran 1-0, D McCormack 0-3, C Murphy, J Barron and M O'Brien 0-1 each.		P O'Brien (1-4f) and S Hayes (0-2f) 1-4 each, P Herlihy 1-2, J Hayes 0-1.	Referee: N Wall (Carrigaline)

23 April 2014 First round	Imokilly	0-15 - 0-20 (AET)	Carbery	Ryecourt
19:00	D Cahill 0-9 (three 65m, five frees), B Lawton 0-2, C O'Brien, K O'Neill, L Murphy, P O'Brien (free) 0-1 each.		J Sheehan 0-7, E Kelly 0-6 (one 65m, one free), F Keane 0-3, A Sheehan 0-2 (one sl), D McCarthy and K Griffin 0-1 each.	Referee: J Larkin (Douglas)

18 June 2014 Second round	Cork Institute of Technology	1-13 - 3-23	University College Cork	Páirc Uí Rinn
19:30	S Murray (0-8, 0-6 frees); M O’Sullivan (1-1); J Lonergan, S O’Regan, J Corkery, K Hallissey (0-1 each).	Report	W Griffin (2-6, 1-4 frees, 0-1 '65); A Spillane (1-1); S Harnedy (0-4, 0-1 free); T Devine (0-3); R O’Shea (0-1 free), M Sugrue (0-2 each); C McSweeney, Cormac Murphy, Cathal Murphy, M Collins, A Breen (0-1 each).	Referee: N Wall (Carrigaline)

7 July 2014 Second round	Carrigdhoun	0-18 - 1-12	Carbery	Páirc Uí Riagáin
	M Kennefick 0-11 (eight frees, one 65), W O'Brien, F O'Leary 0-2 each, D O'Donovan, S McCarthy, C O'Leary 0-1 each.		E Kelly 1-4 (four frees), R Crowley 0-3 (one 65, one penalty), J Sheehan, D Twomey, JM O'Callaghan, R O'Sullivan, M Sexton 0-1 each.	Referee: M Maher (St. Finbarr's)

=== First round ===
31 May 2014 First round	Bride Rovers	2-13 - 1-21	Carrigtwohill	Riverstown
19:45	B Johnson 0-8 (4f), D Dooley 1-3, S Walsh 1-0, E Murphy, M Leddane 0-1.	Report	T Hogan 0-10 (6f, 1 65), S Fives 0-4, R White 1-1, M Fitzgerald 0-3, P Hogan, D O’Mahony, J Horan 0-1 each.	Referee: J Larkin (Douglas)

31 May 2014 First round	Ballymartle	3-16 - 0-15	Courcey Rovers	Páirc Uí Rinn
19:45	D McCarthy (1-5, 1f), J Dwyer (0-4), R Dwyer (1-1), B Corry (1-0), S O’Mahony, B Dwyer (0-2 each), D Dwyer, K Fitzpatrick (0-1 each).	Report	D Lordan (0-9, 5fs), N Murphy (0-4), S Hayes, T Lordan (0-1 each).	Referee: C Lane (Banteer)

19 June 2014 First round	Killeagh	1-15 - 1-16	Glen Rovers	Clonmult Memorial Park
19:30	J Budds (1-4), J Deane (0-5, three frees, one 65m), D Walsh (0-3), P Barry (free), S Long and A Walsh (0-1 each).		P Horgan (0-10, seven frees), G Kennefick (1-0), D Dooling and C Dorris (0-2 each), D Cunningham and D Busteed (0-1 each).	Referee: J Sexton (Ballyhea)

20 June 2014 First round	Na Piarsaigh	1-16 - 3-14	Blackrock	Páirc Uí Chaoimh
19:30	K Buckley 0-8 (three frees, two 65s), P Gould 0-3 (one free), C Joyce 1-0, E Moynihan 0-2, J Gardiner, P O’Rourke, C Buckley 0-1 each.	Report	P Deasy 2-0, G Regan 1-4, D Cashman 0-5 (one free, one 65), S O’Keeffe, O Kelleher (one free) 0-2 each, K O’Keeffe 0-1 (free).	Referee: C McAllister (Aghada)

22 June 2014 First round	Newtownshandrum	1-18 - 1-13	Youghal	FitzGerald Park
15:30	J Coughlan (0-6, 2fs, 1 65), R Clifford (0-3), T O'Mahony (1-0), J Bowles and M Ryan (0-2 each), M Bowles, G Lane, C Twomey (65), C Naughton and PJ Copse (0-1 each).		B Ring (0-5, 2fs), D Ring (0-4, 3fs), L Desmond (1-0 pen), B Cooper (0-2), N Roche and O Dempsey (0-1 each).	Referee: D Daly (Brian Dillons)

22 June 2014 First round	Midleton	1-14 - 1-17	Erin's Own	Páirc Uí Chaoimh
18:45	C Lehane (0-9, eight frees), P White (1-0), A Ryan (0-2), P O'Shea, P O'Keeffe and L O'Farrell (0-1 each).		E Murphy (0-10, eight frees), M O'Connell (1-0), C O'Connell and Kilian Murphy (0-2 each), M Collins, C Coakley and Kieran Murphy (0-1 each).	Referee: C Lyons (Nemo Rangers)

23 June 2014 First round	Sarsfield's	3-10 - 1-19	Douglas	Páirc Uí Rinn
19:45	M Cussen (2-0), C McCarthy (0-6, 0-2 frees), T Óg Murphy (1-1), D Kearney, É Martin, R Murphy (0-1 each).		A Cadogan (1-3), M O'Connor (0-5, 0-4 frees), M Harrington (0-3), A Ward, M Collins (0-2 each), E Dolan, S Moylan, T Delaney (free), E Cadogan (0-1 each).	Referee: D Copps (Ballyhea)

23 June 2014 First round	St. Finbarr's	1-14 - 0-13	Bishopstown	Páirc Uí Chaoimh
18:30	I Lordan (0-4 (three frees), E Maher (1-1), G O'Connor (0-3), D Cahalane, C Keane (0-2 each), J Goggin (free), J Crowley (0-1 each).		T Murray (0-7, five frees), P Cronin (0-3), M Power (0-2), P Honohan (0-1).	Referee: D Kirwan (Éire Óg)

=== Second round ===
29 June 2014 Second round	Bride Rovers	0-15 - 2-25	Sarsfield's	Páirc Uí Rinn
15:00	B. Johnson 0-12 (0-10 frees); M. Collins 0-2; M. Kearney 0-1.	Report	C. McCarthy 1-10 (0-7 frees, 0-1 65); T. Óg Murphy 1-1; M. Cussen 0-7; E. Quigley 0-4; G. O’Loughlin, G. Grey, D. Kearney 0-1 each.	Referee: C Lyons (Nemo Rangers)

29 June 2014 Second round	Killeagh	1-13 - 3-18	Midleton	Youghal
15:30	J Deane (0-6, frees), E Keniry (1-1), G Leahy (0-2), A Walsh, B Barry, D Walsh and S Long (0-1 each).	Report	C Lehane (0-10, 5fs, 1 65), E Walsh (1-3), P White (1-1), P Nagle (1-0), L O’Farrell (0-3), P Haughney (0-1).

19 July 2014 Second round	Na Piarsaigh	1-15 - 2-14	Youghal	Carrigtwohill
19:30	P Gould (1-3, 1-0f), C O’Mahony (0-4), K Buckley (1 65), S O’Sullivan and E Moynihan (0-2 each), P Bourke and A Kenneally (0-1 each).	Report	B Ring (1-8, 0-4fs), L Desmond (1-0 pen), B Cooper and B Moloney (0-2 each), AF O’Connor and C O’Mahony (0-1 each).	Referee: N Wall (Carrigaline)

19 July 2014 Second round	Courcey Rovers	0-11 - 2-12	Bishopstown	Páirc Uí Rinn
19:30	Daire Lordan (0-8, 7fs, 1 65), Dan Lordan, N Murphy, G Moloney (0-1 each).	Report	T Murray (0-6, 3fs), G McGlackin (1-1), B Murray (0-3), E Byrne (1-0), K O’Halloran (f), P Honohan (0-1 each).	Referee: B Murphy (Carrigtwohill)

=== Third round ===
27 July 2014 Third round	Courcey Rovers	0-19 - 3-14 (AET)	Bride Rovers	Páirc Uí Rinn
14:30	Daire Lordan 0-11 (0-10 frees, 0-1 65); S. Hayes, K. Moloney 0-2 each; N. Murphy, S. Holland, V., Hurley, J. O’Reilly 0-1 each.	Report	B. Johnson 2-10 (1-9 frees, 1-0 pen.); O. Murphy 1-0; C. O’Connor 0-3; S. Ryan 0-1.	Referee: C Lyons (Nemo Rangers)

27 July 2014 Third round	Na Piarsaigh	1-22 - 2-15	Killeagh	Páirc Uí Rinn
16:15	K Buckley (0-10, six frees), P Gould (0-4), S Duggan (1-0), D Lee (0-3), S Curtin, E Moynihan, A Kenneally, C Joyce and C Buckley (0-1 each).	Report	A Walsh (1-4), J Deane (0-7, three frees, one 65), G Leahy (1-1), J Budds, M Murphy and D Walsh (0-1 each).	Referee: D Kirwan (Éire Óg)

=== Relegation play-off ===
23 August 2014 Relegation play-off	Killeagh	1-18 - 0-16	Courcey Rovers	Riverstown
19:00	J Deane (0-9, 6fs, 1 65), David Cahill (1-2), J Budds, E Keniry (0-2 each), G Leahy, C Fogarty, B Rochford (65) (0-1 each).	Report	Daire Lordan (0-9, 6fs), S Hayes (0-3), N Murphy (0-2), K Moloney, G Minihane (0-1 each).	Referee: K Murphy (Nemo Rangers)

=== Fourth round ===
8 August 2014 Fourth round	Ballymartle	5-12 - 2-17	Blackrock	Páirc Uí Rinn
19:30	Darren McCarthy 2-1 (1-0 penalty), D Dwyer 0-6 (frees), B Corry 2-0, K McCarthy 1-1, R Cahalane, R Dwyer, J Dwyer (free), K Fitzpatrick 0-1 each.	Report	D Cashman 1-7 (five frees), O Kelleher 1-1, D O’Farrell 0-3, K O’Keeffe (one free, one 65), C O’Leary 0-2 each, S O’Keeffe, G Norberg 0-1 each.	Referee: C McAllister (Aghada)

20 August 2014 Fourth round	Newtownshandrum	1-19 - 0-21	University College Cork	Mallow GAA Complex
19:30	J Coughlan 0-12 (0-9 frees), R Clifford 0-3, C Naughton 1-0, J P King, G Lane, M Bowles, M Thompson 0-1 each.	Report	W Griffin 0-8 (six frees), R O’Shea 0-4 (three frees, one 65), S Harnedy 0-3, M Breen 0-2, C Spillane, M Collins, J Barron, A Spillane 0-1 each.	Referee: D Kirwan (Éire Óg)

22 August 2014 Fourth round	Na Piarsaigh	0-18 - 2-9	Bride Rovers	Páirc Uí Rinn
19:00	K Buckley 0-6 (0-2 '65s, 0-2 frees), P Gould 0-5, C Buckley 0-3, D Lee, J Gardiner, P O'Rourke and A Brady 0-1 each.		B Johnson 1-4 (0-2 frees, 0-1 '65), S Ryan 0-4, C O'Connor 1-0, M Collins 0-1.	Referee: C Lane (Banteer)

22 August 2014 Fourth round	Youghal	0-13 - 1-7	Carrigtwohill	Killeagh GAA Grounds
19:30	D Ring 0-7 (five frees), A Frahill-O'Connor 0-3, L Desmond 0-2, B Ring 0-1.		N McCarthy 1-2, T Hogan 0-3 (two frees), R White, J McCarthy 0-1 each.	Referee: C Lyons (Nemo Rangers)

23 August 2014 Fourth round	Sarsfield's	0-14 - 0-11	Carrigdhoun	Páirc Uí Chaoimh
14:45	C McCarthy (0-7, 5fs, 1 65), T Óg Murphy, E O’Sullivan (0-2 each), E Quigley, G O’Loughlin, M Cussen (0-1 each).	Report	R Walsh (0-6, 5fs), S McCarthy, W O’Brien, F O’Leary, T Murphy, K Corrigan (0-1 each).	Referee: J Larkin (Douglas)

23 August 2014 Fourth round	Erin's Own	1-9 - 3-12	St. Finbarr's	Páirc Uí Chaoimh
16:15	E Murphy (0-5fs), C O’Callaghan (1-0), M Collins, M O’Carroll, B Clifford and Killian Murphy (0-1 each).	Report	I Lordan (0-5fs), C McCarthy (1-2), D Cahalane (1-1), R O’Mahony (1-0), I Maguire, G O’Connor, J Power and B Ramsey (0-1 each).	Referee: J Sexton (Ballyhea)

23 August 2014 Fourth round	Bishopstown	1-8 - 2-16	Glen Rovers	Páirc Uí Rinn
20:00	T Murray (1-3, 0-1f), P Cronin (0-2), B Murray, M Power and K O’Halloran (free) 0-1 each.	Report	C Doris (1-3), G Kennefick (1-1), D Brosnan, D Cunningham, E O’Connell (0-2 each), P Horgan (f), P Virgo, D Cronin, D Noonan, G Callanan and D Goggin (0-1 each).	Referee: C McAllister (Aghada)

31 August 2014 Fourth round	Midleton	2-16 - 2-21	Douglas	Páirc Uí Chaoimh
16:15	C Lehane (0-10, 7fs, 1 65), L O’Farrell (1-2), B Hartnett (1-1), P Haughney (0-2), P O’Shea (0-1).	Report	M O’Connor (0-8, 6fs), M Collins (1-2), A Cadogan (0-5), S Moylan (0-3), M Harrington (1-0pen), A Ward, T Delaney (0-1 pen), F Desmond (0-1 each).	Referee: D Kirwan (Éire Óg)

=== Quarter-finals ===
6 September 2014 Quarter-final	Sarsfield's	3-20 - 1-16	St. Finbarr's	Páirc Uí Chaoimh
14:45	C. McCarthy 0-11 (0-6 frees), E. Quigley and T Óg Murphy 1-1 each, D. Kearney 0-4, K. Murphy 1-0, E. O’Sullivan, R. Ryan and R. Duggan 0-1 each.	Report	I. Lordan 0-7 (0-3 frees, 0-1 65), C. Keane 1-3 (0-1 sideline), G. O’Connor and E. Finn 0-2 each, C. McCarthy and E. Keane 0-1 each.	Referee: D Kirwan (Éire Óg)

6 September 2014 Quarter-final	Douglas	2-20 - 1-9	Youghal	Páirc Uí Chaoimh
16:15	A Cadogan (1-5); M O’Connor (0-6, 0-4 frees); M Collins (1-2); S Moylan (0-3); P Shine, A Ward, M Harrington J Moylan (0-1 each).	Report	B Ring (0-5, 0-4 frees); B Moloney (1-1); B Cooper, D Ring (0-1 free), A Curtin (0-1 each).	Referee: J Sexton (Ballyhea)

14 September 2014 Quarter-final	Na Piarsaigh	3-15 - 0-14	Newtownshandrum	Páirc Uí Chaoimh
14:30	K Buckley (2-5, 0-4 frees); P Gould (1-4, 0-1 pen); Anthony Dennehy (0-4); S O’Sullivan, P Rourke (0-1 each).	Report	J Coughlan (0-6, 0-3 frees, 0-1 pen, 0-1 '65); J Bowles (0-2); M Thompson, C Twomey, M Ryan, C Naughton, J Lane, R Clifford (0-1 each).	Referee: C McAllister (Aghada)

14 September 2014 Quarter-final	Ballymartle	2-14 - 0-22	Glen Rovers	Páirc Uí Chaoimh
16:00	D McCarthy (0-10, 0-6 frees, 0-1 '65), R Cahalane (1-1), J Wallace (1-0), B Dwyer (0-2, 0-1 free), K McCarthy (0-1).		P Horgan (0-11, 0-4 frees, 0-1 sideline cut, 0-1 '65), C Dorris (0-4), D Busteed (0-3), D Brosnan, B Phelan (0-2 each), B Moylan (0-1).	Referee: J Sexton (Ballyhea)

=== Semi-finals ===
28 September 2014 Semi-final	Na Piarsaigh	0-14 - 1-18	Sarsfield's	Páirc Uí Chaoimh
15:00	K Buckley 0-4 (0-2 frees), P Rourke 0-3, C Joyce, I McDonnell 0-2 each, Adam Dennehy, C Buckley, Anthony Dennehy 0-1 each.	Report Report	C McCarthy 1-10 (1-0 sideline, 0-6 frees, 0-1 65), C Duggan 0-3, G O’Loughlin 0-2, E O’Sullivan, T Óg Murphy, D Kearney 0-1 each.	Referee: N Wall (Carrigaline)

28 September 2014 Semi-final	Glen Rovers	1-16 - 1-16	Douglas	Páirc Uí Chaoimh
16:45	D Cunningham (1-1), P Horgan (0-4, 3fs, 1 65), S Kennifick (0-3), D Cronin, D Noonan (0-2 each), D Brosnan, D Busteed, P Virgo, G Callinan (0-1 each).	Report	M O’Connor (0-9, 6fs), A Cadogan (0-3), O Mulrooney (1-0), M Collins, S Moylan, M Harrington, T Cullinane (0-1 each).	Referee: D Kirwan (Éire Óg)

4 October 2014 Semi-final replay	Glen Rovers	2-11 - 1-11	Douglas	Páirc Uí Chaoimh
16:00	C Dorris 1-4, D Brosnan 1-3, P Horgan 0-4 (4f).	Report	M O’Connor 0-6 (4f), A Cadogan 1-3, S Moylan, F Desmond 0-1 each.	Referee: C McAllister (Aghada)

=== Final ===
12 October 2014 Final	Sarsfield's	2-18 - 0-8	Glen Rovers	Páirc Uí Chaoimh
15:30	C McCarthy (0-10, 0-10 frees); K Murphy, T Óg Murphy (1-1); G O’Loughlin (0-3); E O’Sullivan (0-2); D Kearney (0-1).	Report	P Horgan (0-5, 0-5 frees); C Dorris, G Callanan, D Cronin (0-1 each).	Attendance: 12,925; Referee: N Wall (Carrigaline)

== Championship statistics ==
=== Scoring ===
- First goal of the championship: Eamon Collins for Carrigdhoun against Duhallow (Divisions/Colleges first round, 20 April 2014)

=== Miscellaneous ===
- The championship decider between Sarsfield's and Glen Rovers was the last to be played at Páirc Uí Chaoimh before its redevelopment.
- Sarsfield's are the first side since Cloyne between 2004-06 to qualify for three finals in a row.
- Sarsfeild's win their fourth title in eight seasons.
- Youghal return to the senior championship for the first time since 1996.

== Top scorers ==
Overall

Rank	Player	County	Tally	Total	Matches	Average
1	Cian McCarthy	Sarsfield's	2-54	60	6	10.00
2	Barry Johnson	Bride Rovers	3-34	43	4	10.75
3	Keith Buckley	Na Piarsaigh	2-35	41	6	6.83
4	Daire Lordan	Courcey Rovers	0-37	37	4	9.25
5	Patrick Horgan	Glen Rovers	0-35	35	6	5.83
6	Mark O'Connor	Douglas	0-34	34	5	6.80
7	Conor Lehane	Midleton	0-29	29	3	9.66
8	Alan Cadogan	Douglas	3-19	28	5	5.60
9	Joe Deane	Killeagh	0-27	27	4	6.75
10	Darren McCarthy	Ballymartle	3-16	25	3	8.33

Single game

Rank	Player	Club	Tally	Total	Opposition
1	Barry Johnson	Bride Rovers	2-10	16	Courcey Rovers
2	Cian McCarthy	Sarsfield's	1-10	13	Bride Rovers
2	Cian McCarthy	Sarsfield's	1-10	13	Na Piarsaigh
4	Willie Griffin	UCC	2-6	12	CIT
4	Barry Johnson	Bride Rovers	0-12	12	Sarsfield's
4	Jamie Coughlan	Newtownshandrum	0-12	12	UCC
7	Keith Buckley	Na Piarsaigh	2-5	11	Newtownshandrum
7	Brendan Ring	Youghal	1-8	11	Na Piarsaigh
7	Mark Kennefick	Carrigdhoun	0-11	11	Carbery
7	Daire Lordan	Courcey Rovers	0-11	11	Bride Rovers
7	Cian McCarthy	Sarsfields	0-11	11	St. Finbarr's
7	Patrick Horgan	Glen Rovers	0-11	11	Ballymartle
