= Barry Johnson (hurler) =

Cork hurler

Personal information
- Native name: Barra Mac Sheáin (Irish)
- Born: 17 June 1984 (age 42) Bartlemy, County Cork, Ireland
- Occupation: Fitness centre manager
- Height: 5 ft 11 in (180 cm)

Sport
- Sport: Hurling
- Position: Midfield
Club
- Years: Club
- Bride Rovers
Club titles
- Cork titles: 0
Inter-county*
Years	County	Apps (scores)
2009	Cork	0 (0–0)
Inter-county titles
- Munster titles: 0
- All-Irelands: 0
- NHL: 0
- All Stars: 0
- *Inter County team apps and scores correct as of 18:40, 30 July 2017.

Barry Johnson (born 17 June 1984) is an Irish hurler. His National Hurling League and All-Ireland Senior Hurling Championship career with the Cork senior hurling team lasted one season.

Born in Bartlemy, County Cork, Johnson first played hurling and Gaelic football with the Bride Rovers club. After playing in both codes in juvenile and underage grades at a divisional level, he won a Munster Intermediate Club Hurling Championship medal in 2003, having earlier won a county intermediate championship medal.

Johnson made his debut on the inter-county scene at the age of nineteen when he was selected for the Cork intermediate team. He won an All-Ireland medal as a non-playing substitute in 2004. Johnson later joined the Cork senior team as captain of the team during the 2008–09 senior hurling team strike. He was a regular during the National Hurling League and was retained as a member of the championship panel when the strike was called off.

== Career statistics ==
=== Club ===
As of match played 11 August 2019.

Team	Year	Cork IHC		Munster		Total	
Team	Year	Apps	Score	Apps	Score	Apps	Score
Bride Rovers	2002	x	x-xx	—		x	x-xx
Bride Rovers	2003	x	x-xx	2	0-01	x	x-xx
Bride Rovers	Total	x	x-xx	x	x-xx	x	x-xx
Bride Rovers	Year	Cork SHC		Munster		Total	
Bride Rovers	Year	Apps	Score	Apps	Score	Apps	Score
Bride Rovers	2004	2	0-08	—		2	0-08
Bride Rovers	2005	3	1-10	—		3	1-10
Bride Rovers	2006	4	0-10	—		4	0-10
Bride Rovers	2007	4	2-14	—		4	2-14
Bride Rovers	2008	7	0-15	—		7	0-15
Bride Rovers	2009	4	0-18	—		4	0-18
Bride Rovers	2010	5	1-29	—		5	1-29
Bride Rovers	2011	6	0-39	—		6	0-39
Bride Rovers	2012	4	1-26	—		4	1-26
Bride Rovers	2013	3	0-24	—		3	0-24
Bride Rovers	2014	4	3-34	—		4	3-34
Bride Rovers	2015	2	0-13	—		2	0-13
Bride Rovers	2016	3	2-25	—		3	2-25
Bride Rovers	2017	3	0-21	—		3	0-21
Bride Rovers	2018	3	1-11	—		3	1-11
Bride Rovers	2019	2	4-15	—		2	4-15
Total		59	15-322	—		59	15-322

== Honours ==
Bride Rovers

- Munster Intermediate Club Hurling Championship (1): 2003
- Cork Intermediate Hurling Championship (1): 2003

Cork

- All-Ireland Intermediate Hurling Championship (1): 2004
- Munster Intermediate Hurling Championship (1): 2004
