= 2013 Cork Senior Hurling Championship =

Annual hurling competition season

- Dates: 26 March 2013 – 3 November 2013
- Teams: 23
- Sponsor: Evening Echo
- Champions: Midleton (7th title); Pádraig O'Shea (captain); Peter Smith (manager)
- Runners-up: Sarsfield's; Ray Ryan (captain)
- Promoted: Youghal
- Relegated: Ballinhassig

Tournament statistics
- Matches played: 41
- Goals scored: 127 (3.1 per match)
- Points scored: 1200 (29.27 per match)
- Top scorer(s): Conor Lehane (5–48)

The 2013 Cork Senior Hurling Championship was the 125th staging of the Cork Senior Hurling Championship since its establishment in 1887. The championship began on 26 March 2013 and ended on 3 November 2013.

Sarsfield's were the defending champions and made it all the way to the final, however, they were defeated by Midleton on a 2–15 to 2–13 score line.

== Pre-championship ==
Sarsfield's were installed as the early favourites to retain the title for a fourth time in six years and put back-to-back titles together for the first time in their history. Midleton and Cork Institute of Technology were regarded as the two teams that could provide the strongest challenge to Sarsfield's supremacy once again. St. Finbarr's were ranked at 25/1 as they hoped to end a twenty-year wait for the Seán Óg Murphy Cup. Roll of honour leaders Blackrock were ranked at 50/1. Divisional side and Gaelic football stronghold Duhallow were bottom of the pile and are tipped at 100/1 to take the title.

== Team changes ==
=== To Championship ===
Promoted from the Cork Premier Intermediate Hurling Championship

- Ballinhassig

=== From Championship ===
Relegated to the Cork Premier Intermediate Hurling Championship

- Cloyne

=== Summaries ===
Team	Colours	Most recent success			
Team	Colours	Senior	Prem.	Inter.	Junior
Avondhu	Black and amber	1966			
Ballinhassig	Blue and white		2012	1977	2002
Ballymartle	Green and yellow		2010	2006	1986
Bishopstown	Maroon and white		2006		
Blackrock	Green and yellow	2002			1947
Bride Rovers	Green, white and gold			2003	1998
Carbery	Purple and gold	1994			
Carrigtwohill	Blue and gold	2011	2007	1950	1994
Cork Institute of Technology	Blue and white				
Courcey Rovers	Red and white		2011		2001
Douglas	Green, black and white		2009	1997	
Duhallow	Orange and black				
Erin's Own	Blue and red	2007			1987
Glen Rovers	Green, black and gold	1989		1965	1950
Imokilly	Red and white	1998			
Killeagh	Green and white			2001	1995
Midleton	Black and white	1991		1978	1990
Muskerry	White and green				
Na Piarsaigh	Black and amber	2004		1966	1953
Newtownshandrum	Green and yellow	2009		1996	1968
St. Finbarr's	Blue and gold	1993			
Sarsfield's	Blue, white and black	2012			1937
University College Cork	Black and red	1970			

== Fixtures and results ==
=== Divisions/Colleges ===
26 March Round 1	Muskerry	0–9 – 1–13	Carbery	Cloughduv
19.30	M Cremin 0–3 (f), C Cotter 0–2, S Sexton 0–2, P O'Driscoll, C Casey 0–1 each.		D Crowley 0–5 (f), A Hayes 1–1, K Coffey 0–3, F Keane 0–2, E Kelly, M Sexton 0–1 each.	Referee: N Wall (Carrigaline)

26 March Round 1	Cork Institute of Technology	2–18 – 1–12	Duhallow	Mallow GAA Complex
19.30	C Hammersley 1–2, J Cronin 1–1, D Drake 0–4, J Sheedy 0–3 (f), J M O'Callaghan, B Cooper, D O'Halloran 0–2 each, K O'Donnell, N Kelly 0–1 each.		M Vaughan 0–4, K Sheehan 0–3 (1f), W Murphy 1–0, L O'Neill 0–2, A Flynn (f), D Roche, D Hannon 0–1 each.	Referee: J Bermingham (Bride Rovers)

26 March Round 1	Avondhu	1–18 – 2–17	University College Cork	Páirc Mac Gearailt, Fermoy
19.30	P O'Brien 0–6 (4f), A O'Brien 1–2, M O'Sullivan 0–3, D Pyne, D O'Flynn, A Mannix 0–2 each, M Walsh 0–1.		J Aherne 0–7 (0–5 f, 0–1 65), W Griffin 1–3 (1f), S Harnedy 1–2, C Murphy 0–2, K Ryan, Barry Lawton, Brian Lawton 0–1 each.	Referee: J Larkin (Douglas)

4 April Round 2	Duhallow	1–10 – 2–12	Imokilly	Páirc Mac Gearailt, Fermoy
19.30	D Roche 1–1, M Vaughan and M Ellis (0–1 free) 0–2 each, A Nash (free), K Sheehan (free), L O'Neill, John Forrest and N O'Callaghan (0–1 each.		P O'Sullivan 1–6 (0–3 frees, 0–1 65m), J Hegarty 1–0, W Leahy and S O'Regan 0–2 each, L Murphy and D Cahill 0–1 each.	Referee: J Larkin (Douglas)

4 April Round 2	Muskerry	0–12 – 2–18	Avondhu	Mallow GAA Complex
19.30	M Cremin 0–6 (0–5 frees), K Hallissey 0–3, S Olden, D O'Connell, C Cotter 0–1 each.		P. O'Brien 0–8 (five frees, one 65), A Cagney 1–3, E Dillon 1–2, D Geary 0–2, M O'Sullivan, D Flynn, H O'Gorman 0–1 each.	Referee: K Murphy (Nemo Rangers)

23 April Round 3	Imokilly	Abandoned	Cork Institute of Technology	Carrigtwohill
19.00

26 April Round 3 Re-fixture	Imokilly	3–14 – 1–17 (AET)	Cork Institute of Technology	Carrigtwohill
	D O'Sullivan 2–6 (0–3 frees), J McCarthy 1–0, D Cahill and W Leahy (frees) 0–2 each), S O'Callaghan, C Fleming, L Murphy and B Ring 0–1 each.		L McLoughlin 0–6 (0–4 frees, 0–1 65m), M O'Sullivan 1–1, N Kelly, B Cooper and D Drake 0–2 each, D Brosnan, C Hammersley, J M O'Callaghan and J Cronin 0–1 each.	Referee: K Murphy (Nemo Rangers)

8 June Round 4	Avondhu	1–15 – 2–12	Carbery	Cloughduv
	P O'Brien 0–11 (9fs), A Mannix 1–0, A Watson, A Cagney, N McNamara, D O'Flynn 0–1 each.	Report	E Kelly 0–6 (4fs, 1 65), R O'Sullivan 1–1, A Hayes 1–0, J Wall (frees), M Cahalane 0–2 each, J Sheehan 0–1.	Referee: D Carroll (Kanturk)

8 June Round 4	Imokilly	3–10 – 2–20	University College Cork	Riverstown
19:30	D Cahill 3–0, S O'Regan 0–3 (frees), S O'Callaghan and D O'Sullivan (frees) 0–2 each, L Murphy, B Ring and C Fleming 0–1 each.	Report	S Harnedy 2–4 (0-1f), M Howard 0–7 (frees), Barry Lawton 0–3, C Murphy and W Egan 0–2 each, A Breen and R O'Shea 0–1 each.	Referee: C Lane (Banteer)

15 June Round 4 replay	Avondhu	6–15 – 0–13	Carbery	Cloughduv
19:30	S Beston, P O'Brien (1–0 pen, 1f) 2–4 each, E Dillon 1–4, E Clancy 1–0, M O'Sullivan 0–2, A Mannix 0–1.	Report	R Crowley, E Kelly (2f) 0–3 each, M Cahalane, J Sheehan 0–2 each, R Cashman, M Sexton, J O'Donovan 0–1 each.	Referee: J Larkin (Douglas)

=== First round ===
1 June Round 1	Erin's Own	2–16 – 2–19 (AET)	Na Piarsaigh	Páirc Uí Rinn, Cork
18:00	E Murphy 0–8 (6f); M Carroll 1–2; M Collins 1–0; K Murphy 0–2; S Bowen 0–2 (2f); S Murphy, J Sheehan, 0–1 each.	Report	P O'Rourke 1–2; P Goold 0–5 (2f); I McDonnell 1–0; C O'Mahony 0–3; E Moynihan 0–3 (3f); C Buckley 0–2; C Joyce 0–2; K Buckley 0–2.	Referee: C Lane (Banteer)

1 June Round 1	Sarsfield's	2–14 – 1–15	Ballinhassig	Páirc Uí Rinn, Cork
19:30	C McCarthy 1–4 (1–0 pen, 0-2fs), K Murphy 1–1, D Roche, G O'Loughlin, D Kearney 0–3 each.		D Dineen 0–8 (0-6fs, 0–1 65), M Coleman 1–3 (fs), B Coleman, Diarmuid O'Sullivan, Declan O'Sullivan and Shane McCarthy 0–1 each.	Referee: J Larkin (Douglas)

1 June Round 1	Blackrock	0–20 – 1–16	Killeagh	Clonmult Memorial Park, Midleton
19:30	K O'Keeffe 0–7 (0–5 frees), D Cashman (frees), P Deasy 0–4 each, O Kelleher 0–3, D O'Farrell 0–2.		A Walsh 1–3, J Deane 0–4 (0–2 frees), S Long, B Rochford (0–2 penalties, 0–1 free) 0–3 each, P Carroll 0–2, M Byrne 0–1.	Referee: J Sexton (Ballyhea)

2 June Round 1	Bishopstown	2–13 – 1–15	Courcey Rovers	Riverstick
15:30	T Murray 1–5 (0-3fs), D Hickey 1–1, B Murray 0–3, M Driscoll (65), J Murphy, P Cronin (f), P Honohan 0–1 each.		D Lordan 0–10 (7fs), S Hayes 1–1, S Murphy 0–2, S Moloney, V Hurley 0–1 each.	Referee: G O'Connell (Lisgoold)

2 June Round 1	Douglas	1–13 – 1–17	Midleton	Carrigtwohill
16:00	M O'Connor 0–6 (0–4 frees), S Moylan 1–2, A Cadogan 0–3, O Mulrooney and A Barry (free) 0–1 each.		C Lehane 1–8 (0–3 freesm 0–1 65m), P Dowling and P O'Keeffe 0–2 each, J Nagle, L O'Farrell, P White, P O'Shea and B Hartnett 0–1 each.	Referee: J Sexton (Ballyhea)

2 June Round 1	Glen Rovers	3–18 – 2–15	St. Finbarr's	Páirc Uí Chaoimh, Cork
19:30	P. Virgo 2–2; P. Horgan 0–8 (0-6f, 0–1 '65); D. Busteed 1–1; D. Brosnan and C. Healy 0–2 each; B. Phelan, G. Callanan and D. O'Callaghan 0–1 each.	Report	I. Lordan 1–4 (0-1f); E. Maher 1–1; E. Keane (0-1f) and R. O'Mahony 0–3 each; J. Crowley 0–2; G. O'Connor and P. O'Brien 0–1 each.	Referee: D Copps (Ballyhea)

2 June Round 1	Bride Rovers	1–13 – 0–19	Carrigtwohill	Páirc Naomh Caitríonaigh, Ballynoe
20:00	B Johnson 0–10 (0–6 frees), M Kearney 1–0, J Pratt, D Dooley, C O'Connor 0–1 each.		D O'Mahony, P Hogan (0–3 frees), M Fitzgerald (0–2 frees) 0–4 each, S Dinneen 0–3, R White, N McCarthy 0–2 each.	Referee: C Lyons (Nemo Rangers)

2 June Round 1	Ballymartle	2–23 – 2–27 (AET)	Newtownshandrum	Moore Park, Kilworth
20:00	Darren McCarthy 2–6(1-1f), D Dwyer 0–4, B Corry 0–4, B O'Dwyer 0–3(0-2f), K Fitzpatrick 0–3, R Dwyer 0–2, Darragh McCarthy 0–1.	Report	C Naughton 1–4, R Clifford 0–7(0-6f), J Coughlan 1–3, J P King 0–4, PJ Copse 0–3, M Bowles 0–3, M Ryan('65), D Stack and J Bowles 0–1 each.	Referee: C McAllister (Aghada)

=== Second round ===
29 June Round 2	Courcey Rovers	2–14 – 2–11	Killeagh	Páirc Uí Rinn
20:00	D. Lordan 0–5 (0–3 fs); S. Hayes and C. Lordan 1–1 each; Gavin Moloney, G. Minihane and K. Moloney 0–2 each and S. Lordan 0–1.	Report	S. Long 1–1; J. Budds 1–0; A. Walsh (0–1 f) and E. Keniry (0-2fs) 0–2 each; P. Carroll, M. Byrne, P. O'Neill, B. Barry, D. Walsh and B. Rochford (f) 0–1 each.	Referee: K Murphy (Nemo Rangers)

30 June Round 2	Ballinhassig	0–11 – 1–14	Bride Rovers	Páirc Uí Chaoimh
14:30	D Dineen 0–4 (2f, 1 65); D Duggan 0–3; M Collins 0–2; S McCarthy, D O'Sullivan 0–1 each.	Report	B Johnson 0–8 (7f); S Ryan 1–1; D Dooley 0–2; J Mannix, M Kearney, J Pratt 0–1 each.	Referee: C Lyons (Nemo Rangers)

30 June Round 2	Ballymartle	0–11 – 0–16	Erin's Own	Páirc Uí Chaoimh
16:15	B Dwyer (0–4, four frees); D McCarthy (0–3); P Dwyer, B Corry, D Dwyer (sideline), J Dwyer (0–1 each).	Report	E Murphy (0–5, three frees); M Collins (0–4); A Power (0–3); M Carroll (0–3); J Sheehan (0–1).	Referee: J Sexton (Ballyhea)

18 July Round 2	Douglas	2–16 – 1–10	St. Finbarr's	Cloughduv
19:30	M O'Connor 1–8 (0–2 frees), A Ward 1–1, M Collins 0–4, M Harrington 0–2, S Moylan 0–1.		I Lordan 1–4 (1–2 frees), E Maher, G O'Connor, S Callinan, R O'Mahony, P Kelleher and E Finn 0–1 each.	Referee: C McAllister (Aghada)

=== Third round ===
6 July 2013 Round 3	Ballinhassig	0–14 – 1–14	Killeagh	Páirc Uí Rinn
19:45	D Dineen (0–6, 0-3f, 0–1 '65), M Collins (0–4), F O'Leary, B. Coleman (0–2 each).	Report	J Deane (0–7, 0–6 frees), A Walsh (1–3), J Budds (0–3), S Long (0–1).	Referee: J Larkin (Douglas)

17 August Round 3	St. Finbarr's	1–20 – 4–19	Ballymartle	Páirc Uí Rinn
18:00	I. Lordan (0–9, 7f); C. Keane (1–2); G. O'Connor (0–3); E. Finn (0–2); D. Cahalane, E. Maher, E. Keane, J. Neville (0–1 each).	Report	B. Dwyer (0–11, 5f, 2, 65s); R. Dwyer, Darren McCarthy (0–1 free) (1–2 each); Dan Dwyer (1–1); J. Dwyer (1–0); S. Corry, B. Corry, S. O'Mahony (0–1 each).

=== Relegation play-off ===
21 September Relegation play-off	Ballinhassig	0–15 – 1–13	St. Finbarr's	Páirc Uí Rinn
16:00	B Coleman, D Dineen (three frees) 0–4 each, F O'Leary, P Collins 0–2 each, M Collins, B Lombard, S Dineen 0–1 each.	Report	I Lordan 0–5 (four frees), E Maher 1–2, E Finn 0–4, J Goggin, C Keane (sideline) 0–1 each.	Referee: J Bermingham (Bride Rovers)

=== Fourth round ===
10 August Round 4	Avondhu	1–14 – 3–15	Killeagh	Castlelyons
19:15	P O'Brien 1–3 (1–1 frees), A Mannix (0–4), A Cagney (0–2), C O'Flynn, D O'Flynn, E Dillon, A Watson, S Beston (0–1 each).		E Keniry (1–5), J Deane (0–7, four frees, one 65), A Walsh (1–1), S Long (1–0), M Byrne, J Budd (0–1 each).	Referee: J Larkin (Douglas)

17 August Round 4	Newtownshandrum	1–15 – 3–19	Douglas	Páirc Mac Gearailt
18:30	J Coughlan (0–5, 2frees, 1 65), JP King (1–1), M Bowles, G Lane, R Clifford (0–2 each), C Naughton, M Thompson, D Stack (0–1 each).	Report	M O'Connor (1–5, 1f), A Cadogan (0–6), S Moylan, M Collins (1–1 each), A Ward (0–3), O Mulrooney (0–2), M Harrington (0–1, 1f).	Referee: C McAllister (Aghada)

17 August Round 4	Courcey Rovers	1–11 – 1–15	Na Piarsaigh	Páirc Uí Rinn
19:45	D. Lordan (0–9, 8f); S. Moloney (1–0); T. Lordan, V. Hurley (0–1 each).	Report	P. Gould (0–6, 4f); P. Cumming (1–0); E. Moynihan (0–3, 1f); P. O'Rourke (0–2); C., O'Mahony, R. McGregor, C. Buckley, A. Hogan (0–1 each).	Referee: D O'Donnell (Lisgoold)

18 August Round 4	Midleton	1–24 – 1–11	Bride Rovers	Páirc Uí Chaoimh
14:30	C Lehane 0–9 (four frees, one 65), L O'Farrell 0–5, A Ryan, B Hartnett (one free) 0–3 each, P White 1–0, P Haughney 0–2, P O'Shea, J Nagle 0–1 each.	Report	B Johnson 0–6 (four frees), B O'Driscoll 1–0, M Kearney 0–2, D Dooley, S Ryan, D Fitzgerald (f) 0–1 each.	Referee: K Murphy (Nemo Rangers)

18 August Round 4	Erin's Own	0–18 – 3–15	Glen Rovers	Páirc Uí Chaoimh
16:15	E. Murphy 0–8 (0–5 frees), M. Collins 0–5 (01 '65), M. Carroll 0–3, C. Coakley and Kieran Murphy 0–1 each.	Report	P. Horgan 0–8 (0–7 frees and 0–1 '65), P. Virgo 1–2, C. Healy 1–1, B. Phelan 1–0, D. Brosnan, D. Cronin, B. Moylan and G. Callinan 0–1 each.	Referee: D Copps (Ballyhea)

18 August Round 4	Sarsfield's	1–21 – 5–9	University College Cork	Páirc Uí Rinn
18:15	C McCarthy 1–7 (0-4f), M Cussen 0–3, D Kearney, K Murphy (1f), E O'Sullivan and T Óg Murphy 0–2 each, G O'Loughlin, E Quigley and C Leahy 0–1 each.	Report	S Harnedy 3–1, J Ahern 1–3 (0-2f); J Barron 1–0, T Curran, R O'Shea, Brian Lawton, W Griffin and Barry Lawton 0–1 each.	Referee: C Lyons (Nemo Rangers)

14 September Round 4	Ballymartle	2–12 – 0–17	Blackrock	Páirc Uí Chaoimh
16:00	B Dwyer 0–5 (four frees), K McCarthy 1–1, Darren McCarthy 0–3 (one free), S Corry 1–0 (free), P Dwyer, B Corry, R Dwyer 0–1 each.	Report	D Cashman 0–12 (nine frees, one 65), R Dineen, E O'Farrell, D O'Farrell, P Deasy, O Kelleher 0–1 each.	Referee: C Lane (Banteer)

6 October Round 4	Bishopstown	3–17 – 4–12 (AET)	Carrigtwohill	Páirc Uí Chaoimh
16:15	P Cronin 1–6 (1–0 pen, 2f), T Murray 0–5 (3f, 1 sl), B Murray 1–1, D Crowley 1–0, G McGlacken, M Power 0–2 each, B Healy 0–1.	Report	T Hogan 2–2 (1-1f, 1–0 pen, 1 65), S Dineen 1–3, J Barrett 1–2, R White 0–3, M Fitzgerald 0–2 (1f).	Referee: D Copps (Ballyhea)

6 October Round 4 replay	Sarsfield's	2–14 – 0–9	University College Cork	Páirc Uí Rinn
18:30	C. McCarthy 0–6 (frees); T. Óg Murphy 1–1; E. O'Sullivan 1–0; M. Cussen 0–3; K. Murphy and D. Roche 0–2 each.	Report	J. Ahern 0–4 (frees); Barry Lawton 0–2; M. Sugrue, R. O'Shea and D. Curran 0–1 each.	Referee: J Sexton (Ballyhea)

=== Quarter-finals ===
5 October Quarter-final	Na Piarsaigh	2–16 – 0–17	Glen Rovers	Páirc Uí Chaoimh
16:15	I McDonnell (0–8, five frees), P O'Rourke (1–1), S Duggan (1–0), C Buckley, C O'Mahony (0–2 each), R McGregor, C Joyce, K Buckley, (0–1 each).	Report	P Horgan (0–9, seven frees), P Virgo (0–3), D Brosnan (0–2), G Callanan, K McCarthy, C Healy (0–1 each).	Referee: D Kirwan (Éire Óg)

6 October Quarter-final	Ballymartle	5–17 – 4–18 (AET)	Douglas	Páirc Uí Chaoimh
14;30	D McCarthy (2–2), J Dwyer (1–2), K Fitzpatrick, K McCarthy (1–1 each), B Dwyer (0–5, 2fs, 1 65), D Dwyer, B Corry (0–2 each), R Cahalane, D O'Leary (0–1 each).	Report	A Cadogan (1–5), S Moylan (1–1, 1-0f), M O'Connor (0-6fs), M Collins, O Mulrooney (1–0 each), M Harrington 0–3 (2fs), C O'Brien, C O'Mahoney, A Ward 0–1 each.	Referee: C McAllister (Aghada)

12 October Quarter-final	Sarsfield's	5–12 – 2–9	Killeagh	Páirc Uí Chaoimh
	C McCarthy 1–5 (1–2 frees, 0–2 '65's); M Cussen 2–1; T Óg Murphy 1–1; K Murphy 1–0; E O'Sullivan and R O'Driscoll 0–2 each; G O'Loughlin 0–1.	Report	S Long and A Walsh 1–0 each; J Deane 0–3 (0–2 frees); B Barry, K Lane (free), J Budds, P O'Neill, C Fogarty and D Cahill 0–1 each.	Referee: N Wall (Carrigaline)

12 October Quarter-final	Bishopstown	0–8 – 2–18	Midleton	Páirc Uí Chaoimh
	P Honohan 0–3; T Murray 0–2 frees; P Cronin 0–2 (0–1 free); K O'Driscoll 0–1.	Report	C Lehane 1–13 (0–9 frees); D Ryan 1–1; L O'Farrell 0–2; P Haughney and B Hartnett 0–1 each.	Referee: D Copps (Ballyhea)

=== Semi-finals ===
20 October Semi-final	Ballymartle	1–12 – 0–24	Sarsfield's	Páirc Uí Chaoimh
14:00	K McCarthy 1–1, D McCarthy (one 65), B Corry 0–3 each, B Dwyer 0–2 (frees), J Dwyer, S O'Mahony (free), R Dwyer 0–1 each.	Report	C McCarthy 0–8 (seven frees), M Cussen, R O'Driscoll 0–4 each, D Kearney 0–3, G O'Loughlin 0–2, W Kearney, D Roche, T Óg Murphy 0–1 each.	Referee: C Lyons (Nemo Rangers)

20 October Semi-final	Na Piarsaigh	1–6 – 2–21	Midleton	Páirc Uí Chaoimh
15:45	C Buckley 1–1; K McDonnell 0–3 frees; K Buckley and S O'Sullivan 0–1 each.	Report	C Lehane 1–8 (0-3f, 0–1 '65, 0–1 sideline); A Ryan 1–2; B Hartnett 0–4; L O'Farrell, P O'Shea and C Walsh 0–2 each; P O'Keeffe 0–1.	Referee: D Kirwan (Éire Óg)

=== Final ===
3 November Final	Sarsfield's	2–13 – 2–15	Midleton	Páirc Uí Chaoimh
15:00	C McCarthy 1–7 (six frees, one 65), M Cussen 1–1, D Kearney 0–3, G O'Loughlin, E Martin, 0–1 each.	Report	C Lehane 2–10 (two frees, one 65), L O'Farrell 0–3, B Hartnett and P O'Shea, 0–1 each.	Attendance: 11,556; Referee: C Lyons (Nemo Rangers)

== Top scorers ==
Overall

Rank	Player	County	Tally	Total	Matches	Average
1	Conor Lehane	Midleton	5–48	63	5	12.60
2	Cian McCarthy	Sarsfield's	4–37	49	6	8.16
3	Peter O'Brien	Avondhu	3–32	41	5	8.20
4	Darren McCarthy	Ballymartle	5-19	34	6	5.66
5	Mark O'Connor	Douglas	2-25	31	4	7.75
6	Ian Lordan	St. Finbarr's	2-22	28	4	7.00
7	Séamus Harnedy	UCC	6-07	25	3	8.33
7	Patrick Horgan	Glen Rovers	0-25	25	3	8.33
8	Daire Lordan	Courcey Rovers	0-24	24	3	8.00
8	Barry Johnson	Bride Rovers	0-24	24	3	8.00

In a single game

Rank	Player	County	Tally	Total	Opposition
1	Conor Lehane	Midleton	2–10	16	Sarsfield's
2	Conor Lehane	Midleton	1–13	16	Bishopstown
3	Diarmuid O'Sullivan	Imokilly	2–6	12	CIT
3	Darren McCarthy	Ballymartle	2–6	12	Newtownshandrum
3	David Cashman	Blackrock	0–12	12	Ballymartle
4	Conor Lehane	Midleton	1–8	11	Douglas
4	Conor Lehane	Midleton	1–8	11	Na Piarsaigh
4	Peter O'Brien	Avondhu	0–11	11	Carbery
5	Séamus Harnedy	UCC	3-1	10	Sarsfields
5	Séamus Harnedy	UCC	2–4	10	Imokilly
5	Peter O'Brien	Avondhu	2–4	10	Carbery
5	Shane Beston	Avondhu	2–4	10	Carbery
5	Cian McCarthy	Sarsfield's	1–7	10	Midleton
5	Daire Lordan	Courcey Rovers	0–10	10	Bishopstown
5	Barry Johnson	Bride Rovers	0–10	10	Carrigtwohill

== Championship statistics ==
=== Miscellaneous ===
- Midleton reach the championship final for the first time since 1994.
- The championship decider between Sarsfield's and Midleton is the first ever meeting of these two sides at this stage of the championship.
- Midleton win the championship for the first time since 1991.
