= Ray Ryan =

Ray Ryan may refer to:

- Ray Ryan (hurler) (1981–2025), Irish hurler
- Ray Ryan (businessman) (1904–1977), American gambler, oilman, promoter, and developer
- Ray Ryan (baseball) (died 1958), minor league baseball player, manager, team owner and league president
