= 1933 Cork Intermediate Hurling Championship =

Irish hurling competition

- Champions: Lough Rovers (1st title); Michael McCarthy (captain)
- Runners-up: Bride Rovers; Ned Hoskins (captain)

The 1933 Cork Intermediate Hurling Championship was the 24th staging of the Cork Intermediate Hurling Championship since its establishment by the Cork County Board in 1909.

The final was played on 13 August 1933 at the Athletic Grounds in Cork, between Lough Rovers and Bride Rovers, in what was their first ever meeting in the final. Lough Rovers won the match by 5–03 to 2–01 to claim their first ever championship title.

== Results ==
=== Final ===
13 August 1933 Final	Lough Rovers	5-03 – 2-01	Bride Rovers	Cork Athletic Grounds
