= 2012 Cork Senior Hurling Championship =

Annual hurling competition season

- Dates: 26 May 2012 – 7 October 2012
- Teams: 25
- Sponsor: Evening Echo
- Champions: Sarsfield's (5th title); Joe Barry (captain); Pat Ryan (manager)
- Runners-up: Bishopstown; Thomas Murray (captain); Peter O'Driscoll (manager)
- Relegated: Cloyne

Tournament statistics
- Matches played: 31
- Goals scored: 64 (2.06 per match)
- Points scored: 839 (27.06 per match)

The 2012 Evening Echo Cork Senior Hurling Championship was the 124th staging of the county senior championship since its establishment in 1887. The draw for the 2012 fixtures took place on 6 October 2011. The championship began on 26 May 2012 and ended on 7 October 2012.

Carrigtwohill were the defending champions, however, they were defeated in the quarter-finals. Sarsfield's won the title following a 1–15 to 1–13 victory over Bishopstown in the final.

== Team changes ==
=== To Championship ===
Promoted from the Cork Premier Intermediate Hurling Championship

- Courcey Rovers

=== From Championship ===
Relegated to the Cork Premier Intermediate Hurling Championship

- Ballinhassig

== Results ==
=== Divisions/colleges section ===
27 March 2012 Round 1	Imokilly	2-17 - 2-11	Duhallow	Mallow GAA Complex, Mallow
	B Lawton 2-4, P O’Regan (0-4f), P Butler 0-3 each, W Leahy 0-2, C Fleming, C McGann, G Melvin, M Hickey 0-1 each.	Report	S Whelan (0-3f), K Sheahan 1-3 each, D Roche 0-3, A O’Flynn 0-2.	Referee: P Downey (Inniscarra)

28 March 2012 Round 1	Avondhu	1-18 - 1-13	Muskerry	Cloughduv
	P O’Brien 0-10 (0-5 frees, 0-1 65m), A Mannix 0-4 (0-2 frees), D Hayes 1-0, M O’Sullivan, M O’Connor, E Clancy and D Flynn 0-1 each.	Report	M Cremin 1-4 (0-4 frees), A O’Mahony 0-5 (0-4 frees, 0-1 65m), D O’Connell 0-2, N Buckley and D Corkery 0-1 each.	Referee: B Coniry (Crosshaven)

29 March 2012 Round 1	University College Cork	0-25 - 3-16 (aet)	Carbery	Cloughduv
	S Harnedy, W Griffin (0-5f) 0-5 each, W Egan 0-4 (0-2f, 0-1 ’65), J Ahern, M Howard 0-3 each, D McCormack 0-2, M Grace, S Keane, A O’Sullivan 0-1 each.	Report	M Sugrue 2-1, E Kelly 0-5 (0-2f), M Sexton 0-4 (0-2f, 0-1 ’65), J Wall 1-1, G O’Driscoll, F Keane 0-2 each, R Cashman 0-1 (0-1f).	Referee: C Lane (Banteer)

5 April 2012 Round 1 replay	University College Cork	1-15 - 3-07	Carbery	Cloughduv
	J Ahern 0-5 (0-3f), S Harnedy 1-2, D McCormack 0-4, W Griffin, W Egan (0-1f), A O’Sullivan, A Breen 0-1 each.	Report	R Cashman (1-0 pen, 0-1f), D Twomey 1-1 each, M Bradfield 1-0, J Hickey 0-2, D Lucey, R Crowley (0-1f), C O’Driscoll 0-1 each.	Referee: D Kirwan (Éire Óg)

5 April 2012 Round 2	Cork Institute of Technology	2-16 - 0-05	Muskerry	Riverstown
	S Corcoran 1-4 (0-2f), M O’Sullivan 1-1, A Walsh, H Curran 0-3 each, D Drake 0-2, S White (0-1 65), L McLoughlin, N O’Doherty, C Casey, R Barry 0-1 each.	Report	M O’Sullivan 0-2, C O’Sullivan, A O’Mahony, S Sexton 0-1 each.	Referee: C McAllister (Aghada)

10 May 2012 Round 3	Cork Institute of Technology	1-22 - 0-13	Imokilly	Riverstown
	A Walsh 0-4, M O’Sullivan 1-1, N Kelly (0-2f), C Fennelly, L McLoughlin (0-2f), 0-3 each, D Drake, J Cronin, S Corcoran (0-2f) 0-2 each, S O’Brien, T Quaid (0-1f) 0-1 each.	Report	R Feeney 0-6 (0-5f), B Smiddy 0-2f, P Butler, B Lawton, P Roche, N Motherway, M Wall 0-1.	Referee: J Dorgan (Nemo Rangers)

9 June 2012 Round 4	University College Cork	0-20 - 3-15	Avondhu	Páirc Mac Gearailt, Fermoy
	J Ahern 0-5, S Harnedy 0-4, W Griffin 0-4, M Grace 0-3, S Bourke 0-3, P Bergin 0-1.		A Mannix 1-6, M O'Sullivan 0-5, A Cagney 1-2, D Geary 1-0, D Pyne 0-1, D Kelly 0-1.	Referee: D Kirwan (Éire Óg)

27 June 2012 Round 4	Carbery	0-09 - 0-16	Cork Institute of Technology	Páirc Uí Rinn, Cork
	D Crowley 0-4, D Sweetnam 0-1, M Sexton 0-1, J Wall 0-1, D Twomey 0-1, C Keane 0-1.		M O'Sullivan 0-3, D Drake 0-3, S O'Brien 0-2, T Quaid 0-2, N Kelly 0-2, L McLoughlin 0-2, J Cronin 0-2.	Referee: C Lyons (Nemo Rangers)

=== Round 1 ===
26 May 2012 Round 1	Douglas	2-14 - 0-12	Na Piarsaigh	Páirc Uí Rinn, Cork
	S Moylan, R Murphy (0-2fs) 1-3 each, M O’Callaghan, M Collins, O Mulrooney 0-2 each, A Cadogan, D Hanrahan 0-1 each.	Report	P Goold 0-4 (2fs), J Gardiner 0-3 (1f, 2 65s), A Dennehy 0-2, A Brady, C Buckley, C Joyce 0-1 each.	Referee: J O'Connell (Lisgoold)

26 May 2012 Round 1	Newtownshandrum	2-20 - 4-12 (aet)	Killeagh	Moore Park, Kilworth
	C Naughton 2-2, J Coughlan, B O’Connor (2fs) 0-4 each, R Clifford 0-3fs, J O’Connor, K O’Connor 0-2 each, D Stack, M Bowles, P Mulcahy 0-1 each.	Report	J Deane 1-8 (5fs, 1 65), J Budds 1-2, E O’Loughlin, D Cahill 1-0 each, P O’Neill, M Landers 0-1 each.	Referee: K Murphy (Nemo Rangers)

26 May 2012 Round 1	Cloyne	1-10 - 1-18	Sarsfields
	D Cahill 0-8 (7fs, 1 65), K Dennehy 1-0, C Smith, C Cusack 0-1 each.	Report	C McCarthy 1-9 (7fs, 1 65), D Kearney 0-4, M Cussen 0-2, G O’Loughlin, E Quigley, T Óg Murphy 0-1 each.	Referee: C Lane (Banteer)

26 May 2012 Round 1	Carrigtwohill	0-17 - 0-13	Courcey Rovers	Páirc Uí Rinn, Cork
	N McCarthy 0-5, R White, M Fitzgerald (1f) 0-4 each, D O’Mahony 0-2, B Lordan, T Hogan 0-1 each.	Report	D Lordan 0-6, S Hayes 0-3, G Minihane 0-2, S Moloney, N Murphy (f), 0-1 each.	Referee: J Sexton (Ballyhea)

27 May 2012 Round 1	Ballymartle	3-13 - 1-13	Blackrock	Páirc Uí Chaoimh, Cork
	B Dwyer (0-5; 0-2f), Darren McCarthy (1-1), J Dwyer (1-1), R Dwyer (1-0), Dan Dwyer (0-3); S O'Mahony (0-1); B Corry (0-1); S Corry (0-1).	Report	O Kelleher (0-8; 0-4f); C O'Leary (1-0); C Crowe (0-1), E O'Farrell 0-1), P Deasy (0-1), M Ryan (0-1).

27 May 2012 Round 1	Midleton	1-15 - 1-13	Bishopstown	Riverstown
	C Lehane 0-4, P O'Shea, S Hennessy (3fs) 0-3 each, K Mulcahy 1-0, P Haughney, P O'Keeffe 0-2 each, J Nagle 0-1.	Report	P Cronin 0-7 (4fs), K O'Driscoll 1-0, T Murray 0-2fs, G McGlacken, B Murray, M Power, J Murphy 0-1 each.

27 May 2012 Round 1	Glen Rovers	0-09 - 0-18	St. Finbarr's	Páirc Uí Chaoimh, Cork
	P Horgan 0-7 (5fs, 1 65), E Cronin, C Dorris 0-1 each.	Report	E Finn 0-7 (2 65s), I Lordan 0-5 (3fs), G O’Connor 0-3, R O’Mahony, 0-2, J Crowley 0-1.

27 May 2012 Round 1	Erin's Own	2-14 - 0-19	Bride Rovers	Carrigtwohill
	E Murphy 1-7 (0-7 frees); J Sheehan 1-1; K Murphy 0-3; M O’Connell, S Cronin, C Coakley 0-1 each.	Report	B Johnson 0-9 (0-8 frees); J Mannix 0-3; D Dooley, S Ryan 0-2 each; J O’Driscoll, P Murphy, M Collins 0-1 each.

=== Round 2 ===
9 June 2012 Round 2	Courcey Rovers	0-16 - 1-08	Blackrock	Páirc Uí Rinn, Cork
	D Lordan 0-7, S Hayes 0-3, S Lordan 0-2, D Murphy 0-1, K Moloney 0-1, G Moloney 0-1, S Holland 0-1.	Report	O Kelleher 1-7, M Ryan 0-1.	Referee: D Copps (Ballyhea)

9 June 2012 Round 2	Cloyne	1-08 - 0-16	Killeagh	Castlemartyr
	D Cahill 0-7 (6fs), P O’Sullivan 1-0p, C Smith 0-1.		J Deane 0-7fs, E O’Loughlin 0-4, B Collins, J Budds 0-2 each, P O’Neill 0-1.	Referee: J Sexton (Ballyhea)

9 June 2012 Round 2	Bride Rovers	0-10 - 1-10	Na Piarsaigh	Páirc Uí Rinn, Cork
	B Johnson 0-3, M Collins 0-2, C O'Keeffe 0-2, D Burke 0-2, D Dooley 0-1.		P Gould 1-3, J Gardiner 0-5, C Joyce 0-1, Anthony Dennehy 0-1.	Referee: K Healy (Ballymartle)

27 June 2012 Round 2	Bishopstown	1-08 - 0-10	Glen Rovers	Páirc Uí Chaoimh, Cork
	T Murray 1-2 (1f), P Cronin and R Conway 0-2 each, J Murphy and G McGlacken 0-1 each.	Report	P Horgan 0-8 (5f), C Healy and J Anderson 0-1 each.	Referee: D Copps (Ballyhea)

=== Round 3 ===
18 August 2012 Round 3	Glen Rovers	3-18 - 1-08	Cloyne	Páirc Uí Chaoimh, Cork
	P Horgan 0-9 (0-8f, 0-1 65), D Brosnan, D Cunningham 1-3 each, own goal 1-0, E Cronin 0-2, J Anderson 0-1.	Report	P O’Sullivan 1-6 (1-0 penalty, 0-5f), L Cahill, C Cusack 0-1 each.	Referee: D Kirwan (Éire Óg)

18 August 2012 Round 3	Bride Rovers	0-14 - 2-11	Blackrock	Páirc Uí Chaoimh, Cork
	B Johnson 0-5 (0-4f, 0-1 65), M Collins 0-3, J O’Driscoll, D Dooley 0-2 each, J Mannix, S Ryan 0-1 each.	Report	K O’Keeffe 2-6 (0-5f), O Kelleher 0-2, G O’Regan, D Cashman, M Ryan 0-1 each.	Referee: J Sexton (Ballyhea)

=== Relegation play-off ===
15 September 2012 Relegation play-off	Bride Rovers	2-13 - 2-12	Cloyne	Páirc Uí Chaoimh, Cork
	B Johnson 1-9 (5fs), D Burke 1-0, M Collins 0-2, R Murphy, J O’Driscoll 0-1 each.	Report	D Cahill 0-6fs, C Cusack and Colm O’Sullivan 1-0 each, P O’Sullivan 0-3, J Nyhan (free), Domhnall O’Sullivan, E O’Sullivan 0-1 each.	Referee: C Lyons (Nemo Rangers)

=== Round 4 ===
4 August 2012 Round 4	Ballymartle	0-13 - 0-10	Courcey Rovers	Páirc Uí Rinn, Cork
	Darren McCarthy 0-7 (2f, 1 65); B Dwyer 0-4 (2f); S O’Mahony, R Dwyer, 0-1 each.	Report	Daire Lordan 0-7 (3f, 1 65); S Moloney, J Murphy, C Lordan, 0-1 each.	Referee: J O'Connor (Lisgoold)

11 August 2012 Round 4	Killeagh	1-10 - 0-21	Erin's Own	Clonmult Memorial Park, Midleton
	J Deane 0-7 (4fs, 3 65s), A Walsh 1-1; M Byrne 0-2.	Report	E Murphy 0-8 (4fs), K Murphy, M Murphy 0-3 each, A Bowen, C Coakley 0-2 each, M Collins, J Sheehan, C O’Callaghan 0-1 each.	Referee: J Sexton (Ballyhea)

18 August 2012 Round 4	Midleton	2-15 - 0-17	Avondhu	Ballynoe
	C Lehane 1-3, L O’Farrell 1-1, C Walsh 0-4 (frees), P O’Keeffe 0-3, P Haughney 0-2, K Mulcahy, T Wallace (free) 0-1 each.	Report	P O’Brien 0-6 (0-5 frees), A Mannix 0-5 (0-2 frees), S Beston 0-2, D Flynn, J O’Brien, A Cagney, N McNamara 0-1 each.	Referee: C Lane (Banteer)

18 August 2012 Round 4	Newtownshandrum	2-12 - 1-15	Na Piarsaigh	Mallow GAA Complex, Mallow
	D Stack 2-0, B O’Connor 0-3 (1f), J Coughlan, M Bowles, R Clifford 0-2 each, J O’Connor, C Naughton, K O’Connor 0-1 each.	Report	P Gould 0-9 (6fs), J Gardiner 0-3 (1f), K Buckley 1-1, Anthony Dennehy, S O’Sullivan 0-1 each.	Referee: J O'Connell (Lisgoold)

25 August 2012 Round 4 replay	Newtownshandrum	1-11 - 1-15	Na Piarsaigh	Mallow GAA Complex, Mallow
	R Clifford 0-6 (5fs), K O’Connor 1-0, J Coughlan, M Bowles 0-2 each; B O’Connor 0-1f.	Report	J Gardiner 0-4fs, L McDonnell 1-1, K Buckley 0-3, P Gould, S Duggan 0-2 each, P O’Rourke, S Glasgow, R McGregor 0-1 each	Referee: C Lane (Banteer)

25 August 2012 Round 4	Glen Rovers	0-14 - 1-13	Carrigtwohill	Páirc Uí Chaoimh, Cork
	P Horgan 0-9 (4fs, 1 65), B Phelan, G Callanan, P O’Brien, D Brosnan and K Barry 0-1 each.	Report	M Fitzgerald 0-6 (3fs), R White 1-0, N McCarthy and S Dineen 0-2 each, D O’Mahony, T Hogan (65) and J Barrett 0-1 each.	Referee: D Copps (Ballyhea)

1 September 2012 Round 4	Sarsfield's	4-13 - 0-06	Blackrock	Páirc Uí Chaoimh, Cork
	C McCarthy 0-6 (3f, 1 65); W Kearney 1-1; K Murphy 1-1; M Cussen 1-0; T Óg Murphy 1-0; E O’Sullivan 0-3; E Quigley 0-2.	Report	P Deasy 0-2; K O’Keeffe 0-2 (2f); S O’Keeffe, R Dineen 0-1 each.	Referee: C Lane (Banteer)

2 September 2012 Round 4	Cork Institute of Technology	1-26 - 1-12	St. Finbarr's	Páirc Uí Chaoimh, Cork
	A. Walsh 1-2, T. Quaid 0-5 (0-2 fs); S. Corcoran, J. Cronin and L. McLoughlin (0-1 f) 0-3 each; C. Casey, M. O’Sullivan, N. Kelly 0-2 each; D. Drake, J. Corkery, B. O’Sullivan and M. O’Sullivan 0-1 each.	Report	C. McCarthy 1-1; R. O’Mahony 0-3; E. Finn and I Lordan (0-2 fs) 0-2 each; R. Curran (0-1 65), J. Crowley, G. O’Connor, J. Goggin 0-1 each).	Referee: C McAllister (Midleton)

2 September 2012 Round 4	Douglas	1-14 - 1-20	Bishopstown	Páirc Uí Chaoimh, Cork
	R Murphy 0-9 (0-7 fs); M Harrington 1-0 (65); M Collins 0-2; O Mulrooney, A Cadogan, C O’Mahony 0-1 each.	Report	P Cronin 1-10 (0-8 fs); M Power 0-4; G McGlacken 0-3; I Jones, R Conway and J Murphy 0-1 each.	Referee: G O'Connell (Lisgoold)

=== Quarter-finals ===
1 September 2012 Quarter-final	Ballymartle	1-17 - 0-17	Na Piarsaigh	Páirc Uí Chaoimh, Cork
	Darren McCarthy 0-5 (4f); B Dwyer 1-1; R Dwyer 0-3; B Corry 0-3; J Dwyer 0-2 (1 65); S O’Mahony 0-2; D Edmonds 0-1.	Report	J Gardiner 0-8 (6f); K Buckley 0-3; P Goold 0-3 (1f); C Buckley 0-2; S O’Sullivan 0-1.	Referee: C McAllister (Aghada)

1 September 2012 Quarter-final	Bishopstown	1-11 - 0-11	Midleton	Páirc Uí Chaoimh, Cork
	P Cronin 0-8fs, G McGlacken 1-0, M Power, T Murray, J Murphy 0-1 each.	Report	C Walsh 0-5 (4fs), P O’Shea, C Lehane 0-2 each, S O’ Farrell, T Wallace (free) 0-1 each.	Referee: D Copps (Ballyhea)

8 September 2012 Quarter-final	Sarsfield's	3-11 – 0-14	Carrigtwohill	Páirc Uí Chaoimh, Cork
	C McCarthy 1-9 (0-3 frees, 0-2 65s), G O’Loughlin 0-4, K Murphy 1-0, T Óg Murphy 0-2, C O’Sullivan (free), E Quigley, W Kearney, M Cussen and R O’Driscoll 0-1 each.	Report	M Fitzgerald 1-2 (0-2 frees), J Barrett 0-4, S Kidney 1-0, N McCarthy 0-2, T Hogan (free) and R White 0-1 each.	Referee: J Dorgan (Nemo Rangers)

9 September 2012 Quarter-final	Cork Institute of Technology	3-11 – 0-14	Erin's Own	Páirc Uí Rinn, Cork
	C Casey, C Sheehan 1-1 each; T Quaid 0-4 (0-3 frees); L McLoughlin 0-3; M O’Sullivan 0-2; S Corcoran, B Withers, J Sheedy 0-1 each.	Report	E Murphy 0-4 (0-3 frees, 0-1 65); M O’Carroll 1-1; A Bowen 0-3; M Collins 0-2; J Sheehan, Kieran Murphy, P Kelly 0-1 each.	Referee: K Healy (Ballymartle)

=== Semi-finals ===
16 September 2012 Semi-final	Sarsfield's	3-11 – 0-14	Cork Institute of Technology	Páirc Uí Chaoimh, Cork
	C McCarthy 0-6 (0-5 frees); R O’Driscoll 1-2; K Murphy, E O’Sullivan 1-0 each; M Cussen, T Óg Murphy, G O’Loughlin 0-1 each.	Report	L McLoughlin 0-4 (0-3 frees); C Casey, D Drake 0-3 each; M O’Sullivan, N Kelly, C Sheehan (free), T Quaid (free), 0-1 each.	Referee: J Sexton (Ballyhea)

16 September 2012 Semi-final	Bishopstown	1-13 – 0-12	Ballymartle	Páirc Uí Chaoimh, Cork
	P Cronin 0-11 (0-5 frees, 0-2 65s); P Honohan 1-0; B Murray, K O’Halloran (free) 0-1 each.	Report	B Dwyer (0-2 frees) 0-4; B Corry 0-3; J Dwyer, R Dwyer, K Fitzpatrick, S O’Mahony, D McCarthy 0-1 each.	Referee: D Kirwan (Éire Óg)

=== Final ===
7 October 2012 Final	Sarsfield's	1-15 – 1–13	Bishopstown	Páirc Uí Chaoimh, Cork
	C McCarthy 0-8 (0-6 fs); R O’Driscoll 1-1; M Cussen 0-2; G O’Loughlin, K Murphy, D Kearney, T Og Murphy 0-1 each.	Report	P Cronin 0-6 (0-2 fs); D Hickey 1-0; M Power 0-3; D Crowley, G McGlacken, T Murray, B Murray 0-1 each.	Attendance: 11,134; Referee: J Sexton (Ballyhea)

== Championship statistics ==
=== Top scorers ===
Overall

Rank	Player	Club	Tally	Total	Matches	Average
1	Pa Cronin	Bishopstown	1-44	47	6	7.83
2	Cian McCarthy	Sarsfields	2-38	44	5	8.80
3	Patrick Horgan	Glen Rovers	0-33	33	4	8.25
4	Barry Johnson	Bride Rovers	1-26	29	4	7.25
5	Joe Deane	Killeagh	1-22	25	3	8.33
6	Pádraig Gould	Na Piarsaigh	1-21	24	5	4.80
7	John Gardiner	Na Piarsaigh	0-23	23	5	4.60
8	Eoghan Murphy	Erin's Own	1-19	22	3	7.33
9	Dillon Cahill	Cloyne	0-21	21	4	5.25
10	Olan Kelleher	Blackrock	1-17	20	3	6.66

Top scorers in a single game

Rank	Player	Club	Tally	Total	Opposition
1	Pa Cronin	Bishopstown	1-10	13	Douglas
2	Kevin O'Keeffe	Blackrock	2-06	12	Bride Rovers
2	Cian McCarthy	Sarsfields	1-09	12	Cloyne
2	Barry Johnson	Bride Rovers	1-09	12	Cloyne
2	Cian McCarthy	Sarsfields	1-09	12	Carrigtwohill
3	Joe Deane	Killeagh	1-08	11	Newtownshandrum
3	Pa Cronin	Bishopstown	0-11	11	Ballymartle
4	Eoghan Murphy	Erin's Own	1-07	10	Bride Rovers
4	Olan Kelleher	Blackrock	1-07	10	Courcey Rovers
4	Peter O'Brien	Avondhu	0-10	10	Muskerry

=== Miscellaneous ===
- On 9 June 2012, Courcey Rovers record their first ever senior championship victory following a 0–16 to 1–8 defeat of Blackrock.
- St. Finbarr's beat Glen Rovers in the championship for the first time since 1988.
- Bishopstown qualify for the final for the first time.
