= 2010 Cork Senior Hurling Championship =

Annual hurling competition season

- Dates: 1 May 2010 – 10 October 2010
- Teams: 25
- Sponsor: Evening Echo
- Champions: Sarsfields (4th title); Alan Kennedy (captain); John Crowley (manager)
- Runners-up: Glen Rovers; David Cunningham (captain); Ian Lynam (manager)
- Relegated: Blarney

Tournament statistics
- Top scorer(s): Patrick Horgan (6-62)

The 2010 Cork Senior Hurling Championship was the 122nd staging of the Cork Senior Hurling Championship since its establishment by the Cork County Board in 1887. The draw for the 2010 opening round fixtures took place on 13 December 2009. The championship began on 1 May 2010 and ended on 10 October 2010.

Newtownshandrum were the defending champions, however, they were defeated by Erin's Own in the quarter-finals.

On 29 August 2010, Blarney were relegated from the championship following a 1–14 to 1–12 defeat by Blackrock.

On 10 October 2010, Sarsfields won the championship following a 1–17 to 0–18 defeat of Glen Rovers in the final. This was their fourth championship title overall and their first in two championship seasons.

== Team changes ==
=== To Championship ===
Promoted from the Cork Premier Intermediate Hurling Championship

- Douglas

=== From Championship ===
Relegated to the Cork Premier Intermediate Hurling Championship

- Castlelyons

== Results ==
=== Divisions/colleges section ===
1 May 2010 Round 1	Imokilly	3-25 - 0-05	Seandún	Riverstown
	S Harnedy 1-4, B Ring 1-3, P O'Regan 0-5, B Cooper 1-1, P O'Brien 0-3, P Murphy 0-3, T O'Keeffe 0-1, B Smiddy 0-1, B Lawton 0-1, L Sexton 0-1, M Hickey 0-1, R Spillane 0-1.		C McCarthy 0-3, K Foley 0-2.	Referee: J Sexton (Ballyhea)

3 May 2010 Round 1	Avondhu	2-16 - 1-09	Duhallow	Mallow GAA Complex, Mallow
	J O'Callaghan 1-4, K Curtin 1-4, H O'Gorman 0-3, A O'Brien 0-2, R Goode 0-2, M O'Callaghan 0-1.		A Nash 1-0, E Brosnan 0-3, D Roche 0-1, M Ellis 0-1, A Sheehy 0-1, K Sheahan 0-1, J Healy 0-1, W Egan 0-1.	Referee: P Downey (Inniscarra)

4 May 2010 Round 1	Muskerry	1-18 - 0-10	Carrigdhoun	Ballincollig
	D O'Riordan 1-6, T Kenny 0-4, P Finnegan 0-3, S Sexton 0-2, D O'Connell 0-2, T O'Leary 0-1.		D Drake 0-5, J Kingston 0-2, K Corrigan 0-2, P Ronayne 0-1.	Referee: G O'Connell (Lisgoold)

8 May 2010 Round 2	Muskerry	0-19 - 0-15	Avondhu	Ballincollig
	D O'Riordan 0-8, P Finnegan 0-4, D O'Connell 0-3, T Kenny 0-2, M O'Sullivan 0-2.		J O'Callaghan 0-10, A O'Brien 0-4, H O'Gorman 0-1.	Referee: C Lane (Banteer)

8 May 2010 Round 2	Imokilly	4-26 - 0-05	Carbery	Cloughduv
	B Ring 2-3, S Harnedy 1-5, B Lawton 1-5, P O'Regan 0-4, P O'Brien 0-3, L Sexton 0-3, T O'Keeffe 0-1, S Cotter 0-1, B Cooper 0-1.		JP O'Callaghan 0-3, P Crowley 0-1, M Sexton 0-1.	Referee: J Dorgan (Nemo Rangers)

7 June 2010 Round 3	University College Cork	2-10 - 0-13	Imokilly	Riverstown
	J Cassen 2-1, S Burke 0-5, J Halbert 0-2, B Beckett 0-1, M Wilkinson 0-1.		B Ring 0-7, S Harnedy 0-4, T McCarthy 0-1, E Conway 0-1.	Referee: D Kirwan (Éire Óg)

21 June 2010 Round 3	Cork Institute of Technology	6-23 - 0-13	Muskerry	Ballincollig
	A Mannix 3-6, S O'Brien 1-5, L Desmond 1-2, J Sheedy 1-0, C Casey 0-3, L McLoughlin 0-2, B Corry 0-2, S White 0-2, S O'Mahony 0-1.		D O'Riordan 0-5, S Sexton 0-3, D O'Sullivan 0-2, D O'Connell 0-1, R Ryan 0-1, L Ó Riain 0-1.	Referee: C McAllister (Aghada)

=== Round 1 ===
4 June 2010 Round 1	Killeagh	1-10 - 2-14	Carrigtwohill	Clonmult Memorial Park, Midleton
	J Deane 0-5, A Walsh 1-0, B Rochford 0-1, J Fitzgerald 0-1, M Landers 0-1, S Long 0-1, J Budds 0-1.		M Fitzgerald 1-6, R White 1-2, J Barrett 0-2, B Lordan 0-2, N McCarthy 0-1, S O'Farrell 0-1.	Referee: D Copps (Ballyhea)

5 June 2010 Round 1	Sarsfields	0-14 - 1-14	Midleton	Carrigtwohill
	C McCarthy 0-7, G O'Loughlin 0-5, M Cussen 0-2.		S Hennessy 0-5, P Haughney 1-1, L O'Farrell 0-3, P O'Keeffe 0-2, S O'Farrell 0-1, K Mulcahy 0-1, T Wallis 0-1.	Referee: C Lyons (Nemo Rangers)

5 June 2010 Round 1	Ballinhassig	0-23 - 1-15	Blarney	Páirc Uí Rinn, Cork
	M Aherne 0-10, F O'Leary 0-3, D O'Callaghan 0-3, M Coleman 0-2, P Coomey 0-2, D O'Sullivan 0-1, D O'Donovan 0-1, P O'Sullivan 0-1.		M Cremin 1-8, R McNamara 0-2, C Murphy 0-2, C O'Keeffe 0-1, M McCarthy 0-1, D Cronin 0-1.	Referee: J Dorgan (Nemo Rangers)

5 June 2010 Round 1	St. Finbarr's	0-11 - 1-07	Bride Rovers	Páirc Uí Chaoimh, Cork
	C McCarthy 0-2, M Ryan 0-2, K Murray 0-2, G McCarthy 0-1, R Curran 0-1, R O'Mahony 0-1, G O'Connor 0-1, E Keane 0-1.		D Dooley 1-1, M Collins 0-2, D Burke 0-1, M Kearney 0-1, B Johnson 0-1, S Ryan 0-1.	Referee: D Kirwan (Éire Óg)

5 June 2010 Round 1	Newtownshandrum	3-13 - 3-16	Erin's Own	FitzGerald Park, Fermoy
	B O'Connor 0-6, C Naughton 1-2, R Clifford 1-1, John O'Connor 1-0, Jerry O'Connor 0-2, P Noonan 0-1, PJ Copps 0-1.		M Carroll 2-2, E Murphy 1-5, C Corkery 0-3, S Kelly 0-2, A Bowen 0-1, B Clifford 0-1, K Murphy 0-1, S Cronin 0-1.	Referee: D O'Leary (Cloughduv)

5 June 2010 Round 1	Glen Rovers	2-05 - 4-15	Na Piarsaigh	Páirc Uí Chaoimh, Cork
	C Dorris 2-0, P Horgan 0-3, A Dunlea 0-1, D Brosnan 0-1.		A Ó hAilpín 2-0, J Gardiner 0-6, J Egan 1-1, C Lynch 1-1, P Goudl 0-4, S Duggan 0-2, C Joyce 0-1.	Referee: J O'Connell (Lisgoold)

7 June 2010 Round 1	Cloyne	2-13 - 3-11	Bishopstown	Clonmult Memorial Park, Midleton
	A Walsh 0-8, C Cusack 1-3, P O'Sullivan 1-0, Diarmuid O'Sullivan 0-1, E O'Sullivan 0-1.		P Cronin 2-5, D Crowley 1-1, M Power 0-3, G McGlackin 0-1, D Hickey 0-1.	Referee: J Sexton (Ballyhea)

9 June 2010 Round 1	Douglas	3-15 - 2-10	Blackrock	Páirc Uí Chaoimh, Cork
	S Moylan 0-6, M Collins 1-2, F Desmond 1-1, J Moylan 1-0, B Fitzgerald 0-2, O Mulrooney 0-1, E Cadogan 0-1, M Harrington 0-1, J Collins 0-1.		F Ryan 1-4, D Cashman 1-1, B Ahern 0-2, M Ahern 0-2, D O'Shea 0-1.	Referee: J Sexton (Ballyhea)

=== Round 2 ===
25 June 2010 Round 2	Killeagh	1-14 - 1-11	Cloyne	Castlemartyr
	J Deane 0-10, M Landers 1-1, E Loughlin 0-2, J Budds 0-1.		P O'Sullivan 1-6, C Cusack 0-2, A Walsh 0-2, Donal O'Sullivan 0-1.	Referee: C Lyons (Nemo Rangers)

27 June 2010 Round 2	Bride Rovers	1-17 - 3-23	Glen Rovers	Páirc Uí Chaoimh, Cork
	B Johnson 0-10, S Ryan 1-2, M Collins 0-2, D Dooley 0-1, J O'Driscoll 0-1, D Burke 0-1.		P Horgan 1-11, C Dorris 0-6, D Brosnan 1-1, D Goggin 1-1, P Cronin 0-1, A Dunlea 0-1, R Whitty 0-1, E Cronin 0-1.	Referee: D Kirwan (Éire Óg)

27 June 2010 Round 2	Blarney	1-12 - 2-15	Newtownshandrum	Mallow GAA Complex, Mallow
	M Cremin 0-6, B Hurley 1-0, J Jordan 0-2, J Hughes 0-1, J O'Regan 0-1, J Hurley 0-1, C O'Keeffe 0-1.		M Bowles 1-1, J Bowles 1-1, B O'Connor 0-4, C Naughton 0-3, J O'Connor 0-2, J Coughlan 0-2, R Clifford 0-1, PJ Copps 0-1.	Referee: C McAllister (Aghada)

27 June 2010 Round 2	Blackrock	1-06 - 2-19	Sarsfields	Páirc Uí Chaoimh, Cork
	D Cashman 0-5, C O'Leary 1-0, S O'Keeffe 0-1.		R O'Driscoll 2-10, C McCarthy 0-4, D Roche 0-2, D Kearney 0-1, G O'Loughlin 0-1, T Óg Murphy 0-1.	Referee: K Healy (Ballymartle)

=== Round 3 ===
14 August 2010 Round 3	Blackrock	0-13 - 0-14	Cloyne	Páirc Uí Chaoimh, Cork
	D Cashman 0-4, B O'Keeffe 0-3, D O'Shea 0-2, C O'Leary 0-1, D Gosnell 0-1, M Russell 0-1, W Sherlock 0-1.		P O'Sullivan 0-6, Diarmuid O'Sullivan 0-3, C O'Sullivan 0-2, J Cotter 0-1, Donal O'Sullivan 0-1, L O'Driscoll 0-1.	Referee: D Kirwan (Éire Óg)

15 August 2010 Round 3	Blarney	1-09 - 1-14	Bride Rovers	Páirc Uí Chaoimh, Cork
	M Cremin 0-8, J Hurley 1-0, D Cronin 0-1.		B Johnson 1-9, K Collins 0-1, M Collins 0-1, S Boyce 0-1, J O'Driscoll 0-1, S Ryan 0-1.	Referee: G Harrington (Carrigaline)

=== Relegation play-off ===
29 August 2010 Relegation play-off	Blackrock	1-14 - 1-12	Blarney	Páirc Uí Chaoimh, Cork
	D Cashman 0-6, K O'Keeffe 1-0, C O'Leary 0-2, E O'Farrell 0-2, B O'Keeffe 0-1, A Browne 0-1, D Gosnell 0-1, D O'Shea 0-1.		C Murphy 1-0, M Cremin 0-3, R McNamara 0-2, J Hughes 0-1, B Hurley 0-1, C Buckley 0-1, M McCarthy 0-1, D Cronin 0-1, J O'Regan 0-1, E McCarthy 0-1.	Referee: C McAllister (Aghada)

=== Round 4 ===
13 August 2010 Round 4	Ballinhassig	1-11 - 0-17	Erin's Own	Páirc Uí Rinn, Cork
	M Aherne 1-8, F O'Leary 0-1, M Coleman 0-1, P Coomey 0-1.		E Murphy 0-10, A Bowen 0-2, M O'Connor 0-2, C Coakley 0-2, Kieran Murphy 0-1.	Referee: J Duggan (Nemo Rangers)

14 August 2010 Round 4	Midleton	1-15 - 0-16	Na Piarsaigh	Páirc Uí Chaoimh, Cork
	S Hennessy 0-9, L O'Farrell 1-3, C Lehane 0-2, P O'Keeffe 0-1.		J Gardiner 0-8, C Lynch 0-2, A Ó hAilpín 0-2, P Gould 0-2, R McGregor 0-1, S Glasgow 0-1.	Referee: C Lane (Lyre)

15 August 2010 Round 4	Killeagh	0-11 - 0-13	Sarsfields	Clonmult Memorial Park, Midleton
	J Deane 0-7, J Budds 0-2, M Landers 0-1, L Collins 0-1.		R O'Driscoll 0-4, C McCarthy 0-3, K Murphy 0-2, G O'Loughlin 0-2, M Cussen 0-1, P Ryan 0-1.	Referee: D O'Leary (Cloughduv)

17 August 2010 Round 4	Cork Institute of Technology	0-18 - 0-11	Bishopstown	Páirc Uí Rinn, Cork
	A Mannix 0-8, C Casey 0-3, M O'Sullivan 0-2, B Corry 0-1, L McLoughlin 0-1, G White 0-1, S Daniels 0-1, S O'Mahony 0-1.		M Power 0-3, B Murray 0-3, T Murray 0-2, G McGlackin 0-1, P Cronin 0-1, S O'Neill 0-1.	Referee: G Harrington (Carrigaline)

20 August 2010 Round 4	Carrigtwohill	0-14 - 1-13	Bride Rovers	Ballynoe
	M Fitzgerald 0-6, N McCarthy 0-4, R White 0-3, Seán O'Farrell 0-1.		M Collins 1-1, B Johnson 0-4, P Murphy 0-2, J O'Driscoll 0-2, S Ryan 0-2, K Collins 0-1, Brian Murphy 0-1.	Referee: D Copps (Ballyhea)

21 August 2010 Round 4	Newtownshandrum	1-19 - 2-07	Cloyne	FitzGerald Park, Fermoy
	B O'Connor 0-6, R Clifford 0-5, Jerry O'Connor 0-4, J Coughlan 1-0, M Bowles 0-2, John O'Connor 0-1, PJ Copps 0-1,		Diarmuid O'Sullivan 2-0, P O'Sullivan 0-5, M Walsh 0-1, L O'Driscoll 0-1.	Referee: J Sexton (Ballyhea)

21 August 2010 Round 4	St. Finbarr's	4-09 - 2-15	Glen Rovers	Páirc Uí Chaoimh, Cork
	T Olden 2-0, R O'Mahony 1-1, C McCarthy 0-4, J Fitzpatrick 1-0, K Murray 0-3, G McCarthy 0-1.		P Horgan 1-9, D Brosnan 1-0, D Busteed 0-1, P O'Brien 0-1, C Dorris 0-1, D O'Callaghan 0-1, R Whitty 0-1, G Callanan 0-1.	Referee: C McAllister (Aghada)

30 August 2010 Round 4	Douglas	1-13 - 0-09	University College Cork	Páirc Uí Rinn, Cork
	M Harrington 1-2, S Moylan 0-5, J Collins 0-1, F Desmond 0-1, E Cadogan 0-1, B Fitzgerald 0-1, J Moylan 0-1, C Lucey 0-1.		E Martin 0-4, W Griffin 0-2, M Wilkinson 0-1, K Hartnett 0-1, M Grace 0-1.	Referee: G O'Connell (Lisgoold)

4 September 2010 Round 4 replay	Glen Rovers	2-14 - 1-11	St. Finbarr's	Páirc Uí Chaoimh, Cork
	P Horgan 1-9, C Dorris 1-1, B Moylan 0-1, D Brosnan 0-1, D Busteed 0-1, D Cunningham 0-1.		K Murray 0-5, R O'Mahony 1-1, G O'Connor 0-2, A Fitzpatrick 0-1, C McCarthy 0-1, M Ryan 0-1.	Referee: D Kirwan (Éire Óg)

=== Quarter-finals ===
28 August 2010 Quarter-final	Newtownshandrum	3-11 - 2-14	Erin's Own	Páirc Uí Chaoimh, Cork
	J Bowles 1-1, M Bowles 1-1, B O'Connor 0-4, C Naughton 1-0, R Clifford 0-2, PJ Copps 0-1, Jerry O'Connor 0-1, John O'Connor 0-1.	Report	E Murphy 0-8, M O'Carroll 1-1, K Murphy 1-0, B Clifford 0-3, S Kelly 0-1, C Coakley 0-1.	Referee: D Kirwan (Éire Óg)

29 August 2010 Quarter-final	Sarsfield's	2-20 - 2-06	Bride Rovers	Páirc Uí Chaoimh, Cork
	C McCarthy 0-11, E O'Sullivan 1-1, M Cussen 1-1, D Kearney 0-3, R O'Donnell 0-3, K Murphy 0-1.	Report	D Ryan 2-0, B Johnson 0-5, P Murphy 0-1.	Referee: J Sexton (Ballyhea)

4 September 2010 Quarter-final replay	Newtownshandrum	1-07 - 1-14	Erin's Own	Páirc Uí Chaoimh, Cork
	C Naughton 1-1, B O'Connor 0-4, PJ Copps 0-1, R Clifford 0-1.		E Murphy 0-6, A Bowen 1-0, M O'Connor 0-3, C Coakley 0-2, S Kelly 0-1, J Sheehan 0-1, K Murphy 0-1.	Referee: C Lyons (Nemo Rangers)

12 September 2010 Quarter-final	Glen Rovers	2-13 - 0-19	Midleton	Páirc Uí Chaoimh, Cork
	P Horgan 2-8, D Brosnan 0-2, D Goggin 0-1, D Cronin 0-1, D Busteed 0-1.	Report	C Lehane 0-6, L O'Farrell 0-4, P Haughney 0-4, S Hennessy 0-3, S O'Farrell 0-1, K Mulcahy 0-1.	Referee: K Healy (Ballymartle)

26 September 2010 Quarter-final replay	Glen Rovers	3-15 - 4-10	Midleton	Páirc Uí Chaoimh, Cork
	P Horgan 0-7, D Brosnan 1-1, C Dorris 1-1, D O'Callaghan 1-0, D Goggin 0-2, R Whitty 0-2, D Cunningham 0-1, D Cronin 0-1.	Report	C Lehane 1-7, S Hennessy 1-2, S Moore 1-1, L O'Farrell 1-0.	Referee: J Sexton (Ballyhea)

27 September 2010 Quarter-final	Douglas	2-24 - 3-20 (aet)	Cork Institute of Technology	Páirc Uí Rinn, Cork
	M Harrington 1-5, S Moylan 0-8, J Moylan 1-2, F Desmond 0-2, B Fitzgerald 0-2, O Mulrooney 0-2, C Lucey 0-1, E Cadogan 0-1, M Collins 0-1.	Report	T Murphy 2-1, B Corry 0-5, A Mannix 0-4, S O'Brien 0-4, J Sheedy 1-0, M O'Sullivan 0-3, L Desmond 0-2, L McLoughlin 0-1.	Referee: C McAllister (Aghada)

=== Semi-finals ===
26 September 2010 Semi-final	Sarsfield's	0-17 - 0-15	Erin's Own	Páirc Uí Chaoimh, Cork
	C McCarthy 0-8, K Murphy 0-4, G O'Loughlin 0-2, T Óg Murphy 0-1, M Cussen 0-1, D Roche 0-1.	(report)	E Murphy 0-9, M O'Connor 0-2, C O'Connor 0-2, A Bowen 0-1, Kieran Murphy 0-1.	Referee: D Kirwan (Éire Óg)

3 October 2010 Semi-final	Glen Rovers	1-17 - 1-12	Douglas	Páirc Uí Chaoimh, Cork
	P Horgan 1-5 (four frees, one ‘65); R Whitty 0-3; C Dorris, D Cunningham 0-2 each; S McDonnell, P O’Brien, D O’Callaghan, A Dunlea, D Goggin 0-1 each.	(report)	S Moylan 0-4 (three frees); O Mulrooney 1-0; E Cadogan 0-3 (two frees, one ‘65); J Moylan, M Harrington (one free) 0-2 each; B Fitzgerald 0-1.	Referee: J Sexton (Ballyhea)

=== Final ===
10 October 2010 Final	Sarsfield's	1-17 – 0-18	Glen Rovers	Páirc Uí Chaoimh, Cork
	C McCarthy 0-8 (0-6 frees, 0-1 65); C O’Sullivan 1-1 (frees); G O’Loughlin 0-3; T Óg Murphy 0-3; K Murphy, D Kearney, 0-1 each.	Report	P Horgan 0-10 (0-8 frees, 0-1 65); D Brosnan 0-2; D Cunningham 0-2; B Moylan 0-2 (0-1 free); G Moylan, D Busteed, 0-1 each.	Attendance: 12,925; Referee: D Copps (Ballyhea)

== Championship statistics ==
=== Scoring statistics ===
Top scorers overall

Rank	Player	Club	Tally	Total	Matches	Average
1	Patrick Horgan	Glen Rovers	6-62	80	8	10.00
2	Eoghan Murphy	Erin's Own	1-38	41	5	8.20
2	Cian McCarthy	Sarsfields	0-41	41	6	6.66
3	Barry Johnson	Bride Rovers	1-29	32	5	6.40
4	Mark Cremin	Blarney	1-25	28	4	7.00
5	Adrian Mannix	CIT	3-18	27	3	9.00
6	Ben O'Connor	Newtownshandrum	0-24	24	5	4.80
7	Conor Dorris	Glen Rovers	4-11	23	8	2.87
7	Stephen Moylan	Douglas	0-23	23	4	5.75
8	Brendan Ring	Imokilly	3-13	22	3	7.33
8	Diarmuid O'Riordan	Muskerry	1-19	22	3	7.33
8	Seán Hennessy	Midleton	1-19	22	4	5.50
8	Joe Deane	Killeagh	0-22	22	3	7.33

Top scorers in a single game

Rank	Player	Club	Tally	Total	Opposition
1	Robert O'Driscoll	Sarsfields	2-10	16	Blackrock
2	Adrian Mannix	CIT	3-06	15	Muskerry
3	Patrick Horgan	Glen Rovers	2-08	14	Midleton
3	Patrick Horgan	Glen Rovers	1-11	14	Bride Rovers
4	Barry Johnson	Bride Rovers	1-09	12	Blarney
4	Patrick Horgan	Glen Rovers	1-09	12	St. Finbarr's
4	Patrick Horgan	Glen Rovers	1-09	12	St. Finbarr's
4	Pa Cronin	Bishopstown	2-05	11	Cloyne
4	Mark Cremin	Blarney	1-08	11	Ballinhassig
4	Michael Ahern	Ballinhassig	1-08	11	Erin's Own
4	Cian McCarthy	Sarsfields	0-11	11	Bride Rovers

=== Miscellaneous ===
- Sarsfield's qualify for three finals in a row for the first time.
- Douglas reached the semi-final stages of the championship for the first time ever.
- Glen Rovers qualified for the final for the first time since 1991.
