= MTU Cork GAA =

Gaelic games club in County Cork, Ireland

MTU Cork
- Ollscoil Teicneolaíochta na Mumhan, Corcaigh
- Founded: 1975
- County: Cork
- Colours: Red and white
- Grounds: Rossa Avenue, Bishopstown

Playing kits
Standard colours

Senior Club Championships
	All Ireland	Munster champions	Cork champions
Football:	0	0	0
Hurling:	0	0	0

Munster Technological University Cork GAA club is a Gaelic Athletic Association club located in the Munster Technological University in Bishopstown, Cork, Ireland. The club fields teams in a range of competitions in both hurling and Gaelic football.

== History ==
Gaelic games were first played at the then Cork Regional Technical College when a student Gaelic football team was established in 1975. A student hurling team was set up the following year. The staff of the RTC Cork also had an active GAA club, and competed in various inter-firm hurling and football competitions.

In 1995, Cork RTC made their debuts in the Fitzgibbon Cup and Sigerson Cup. Teams were also fielded that year in the Cork SHC and Cork SFC for the first time. Three unsuccessful appearances in Fitzgibbon Cup finals followed, while Cork Institute of Technology, as it was then known, won the Sigerson Cup title in 2009. The Cork Institute of Technology also made an unsuccessful appearance in the 2011 Cork SHC final.

== Honours ==
=== Football ===
- Sigerson Cup (1): 2009
- Trench Cup (2): 1979, 2020

=== Hurling ===
- Ryan Cup (3): 1977, 1980, 1989

== Notable players ==
Football

- Eoin Cadogan
- Graham Canty
- Daniel Goulding
- John Kerins
- Jimmy Kerrigan
- Paul Kerrigan
- Donnacha O'Connor
- Aidan O'Mahony
- Bryan Sheehan
- Paul Ring
- Alan Dunwoody

Hurling

- Brian Corcoran
- John Gardiner
- Anthony Nash
- Jackie Tyrell
- Aidan Walsh
- Johnny Murphy
