= Bride Rovers GAA =

GAA club in Cork, Ireland

Bride Rovers
- Fánaithe na Bríde
- Founded: 1928
- County: Cork
- Colours
- Grounds: Páirc na Bríde
- Coordinates: 52°04′19.53″N 8°17′10.54″W

Playing kits
Standard colours

Bride Rovers GAA Club is a Gaelic Athletic Association club in Rathcormac, County Cork, Ireland. The club is affiliated to the East Cork Board and fields teams in both hurling and Gaelic football.

== History ==
Located in the parish of Rathcormac, about 8km from Fermoy, Bride Rovers GAA Club was established in 1928. The club draws its players from the villages of Rathcormac and Bartlemy, whose existing clubs amalgamated to form the new one. The new club spent the majority of its existence operating in the junior grade and won East Cork JHC titles in 1930 and 1932. Bride Rovers also contested the 1933 Cork IHC final but lost out to Lough Rovers. The club has also seen various periods of inactivity and was disbanded in 1950.

Bride Rovers was reformed in December 1964 and within two years had won the East Cork JBHC title. Consecutive East Cork JAHC titles followed in 1968 and 1969. Bride Rovers made the breakthrough in 1998 when Freemount were beaten by 2–10 to 0–13 to claim the Cork JAHC title. This was subsequently converted into a Munster Club JHC title.

The new century saw Bride Rovers win the Cork IHC title and secure senior status for the first time, while also claiming the inaugural Munster Club IHC title in 2003. Within four years, Bride Rovers reached the 2004 Cork SHC final, however, Sarsfields won the title with a 2–14 to 2–13 victory. The new century has also seen Bride Rovers win three East Cork JAFC titles.

== Honours ==
- Cork Senior A Hurling Championship(1): 2025
- Munster Intermediate Club Hurling Championship (1): 2003
- Cork Intermediate Hurling Championship (1): 2003
- Munster Junior Club Hurling Championship (1): 1998
- Cork Junior A Hurling Championship (1): 1998
- East Cork Junior A Football Championship (3): 2004, 2007, 2021
- East Cork Junior A Hurling Championship (5): 1930, 1932, 1968, 1969, 1998
- Cork Under-21 A Hurling Championship (1): 2018
- Cork Minor Hurling Championship (1): 1932
- Cork Minor A Hurling Championship (1): 2017
- Cork Premier 2 Minor Hurling Championship (1): 2018
- Cork Minor C Hurling Championship (1): 2013

== Notable players ==
- Seánie Barry: All-Ireland SHC–winner (1966, 1970)
- Brian Murphy: All-Ireland SHC–winner (2004, 2005)
- Brian Roche: National Hurling League–winner (2025)
