= Diarmuid O'Sullivan =

Irish hurling coach

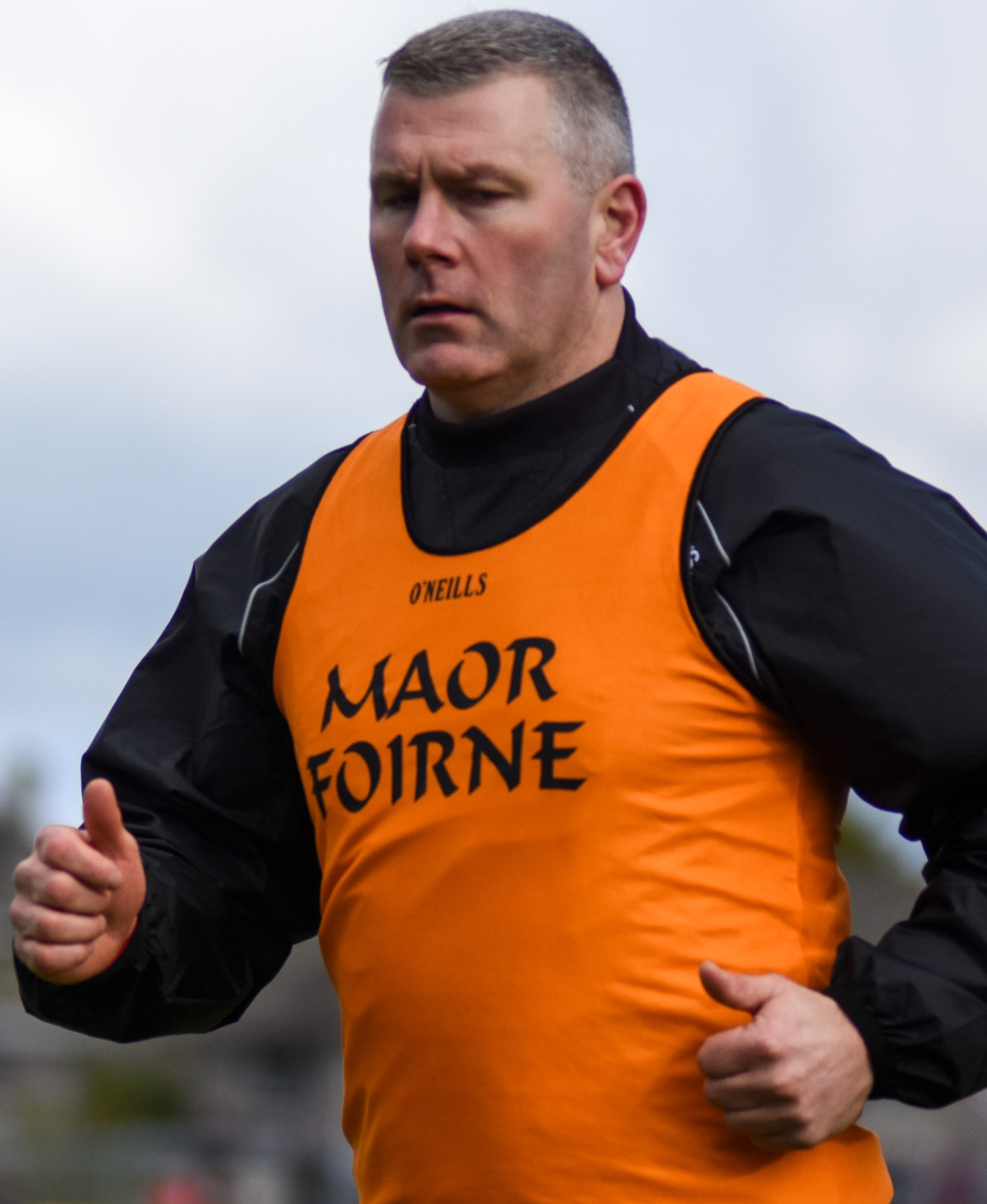

Personal information
- Native name: Diarmuid Ó Súilleabháin (Irish)
- Nickname: The Rock
- Born: 27 July 1978 (age 48) Cloyne, County Cork, Ireland
- Height: 6 ft 2 in (188 cm)

Sport
- Sport: Hurling
- Position: Full-back
Clubs
| Years | Club | Apps (scores) |
| 1995–2020 1996–1997 | Cloyne; Imokilly | 56 (16-91) |
Club titles
- Cork titles: 1
Inter-county*
| Years | County | Apps (scores) |
| 1997–2009 | Cork | 48 (0–03) |
Inter-county titles
- Munster titles: 5
- All-Irelands: 3
- NHL: 1
- All Stars: 4
- *Inter County team apps and scores correct as of 22:23, 9 February 2014.

Diarmuid O'Sullivan (born 27 July 1978) is an Irish hurling coach and hurler who plays for Cork Premier Championship club Cloyne. He played for the Cork senior hurling team for 12 years, during which time he usually lined out as a full-back. A fan favourite who was noted for his swashbuckling style during his inter-county career, O'Sullivan is considered a "Cork legend".

O'Sullivan began his hurling career at club level with Cloyne, for whom his father Jerry O'Sullivan, had also played. He broke onto the club's top adult team as a 16-year-old in 1995 and enjoyed his greatest success two years later when the club won the 1997 Cork Intermediate Championship title and promotion. O'Sullivan has made 90 championship appearances in three different grades of hurling for the club, while his early prowess also saw him selected for the Imokilly divisional team with whom he won the 1997 Cork Senior Championship.

At inter-county level, O'Sullivan was part of the successful Cork under-21 team that won back-to-back All-Ireland Championships in 1997 and 1998. He joined the Cork senior team in 1997. From his debut, O'Sullivan was ever-present as a defender and made a combined total of 110 National League and Championship appearances in a career that ended with his last game in 2008. During that time he was part of three All-Ireland Championship-winning teams – in 1999, 2004 and 2005. O'Sullivan also secured five Munster Championship medals and a National Hurling League medal as captain of the team. As a dual player at the highest level, he won a Munster Championship medal with the Cork senior football team in 2002. O'Sullivan announced his retirement from inter-county hurling on 12 May 2009, instead opting to transition to rugby, where he had stints with Cork clubs Highfield and Midleton.

O'Sullivan was named Young Hurler of the Year in 1999 while he also won his first All-Star that year. He claimed a further three All-Stars in 2000, 2004 and 2005. At inter-provincial level, O'Sullivan was selected to play in five championship campaigns with Munster, with his sole Railway Cup medal being won in 2000.

== Early life ==
O'Sullivan was born in Cork and raised in Cloyne in East Cork. His father, Jerry O'Sullivan, played with the Cloyne club from the 1960s until the 1990s before later serving as an administrator with the Cork County Board and the Munster Council. O'Sullivan's brother, Paudie, has also been a member of the Cork senior hurling team.

== Playing career ==
=== Midleton CBS ===
During his secondary schooling at Midleton CBS Secondary School, O'Sullivan was more renowned as a Gaelic footballer before joining the college's senior hurling team. On 26 March 1995, he was at right wing-forward on the Midleton CBS team that defeated Lismore CBS by 3-18 to 3-05 to win the Harty Cup title. O'Sullivan lined out on the Midleton CBS senior hurling team for a further two years. He later said: "I found Harty hurling much tougher than minor inter-county. The games were of an intensity that I had never previously encountered. You became aware very quickly of the standard required to compete and you had to adapt to the various styles played by schools from the different counties. It toughened me up a fair bit and stood to me in my later career with Cork."

=== Cloyne ===
O'Sullivan joined the Cloyne club as a seven-year-old and played in all grades at juvenile and underage levels. Speaking of his first hurling appearance he said: "I went on not knowing what I was leaving myself in for but I knew when I came off I wanted more of it." O'Sullivan was first selected for the club's intermediate team in 1995.

On 20 October 1996, O'Sullivan was at left wing-back when Cloyne drew with Newtownshandrum in the final of the Cork Intermediate Championship. He lined out in the same position a fortnight later when Cloyne were defeated in the replay by 0-12 to 0-09.

O'Sullivan lined out at left wing-back in his second successive final on 2 November 1997. A 1-12 to 1-07 defeat of Delanys secured the title and a Cork Intermediate Championship medal for O'Sullivan.

On 31 October 2004, O'Sullivan was at right wing-back when Cloyne qualified to face Na Piarsaigh in the final of the Cork Senior Championship. He was switched to centre-back during the game and scored a point from as free, however, Cloyne were defeated by 0-17 to 0-10.

Cloyne qualified for a second successive Cork Senior Championship final with Newtownshandrum providing the opposition on 16 October 2005. O'Sullivan lined out at centre-back in the 0-15 to 0-09 defeat.

O'Sullivan was appointed captain of the Cloyne team for the 2006 championship, while he also took up a new position at centre-forward. On 22 October 2006, he captained the team when they were defeated by 2-19 to 3-14 by Erin's Own in the Cork Senior Hurling Championship final.

=== Imokilly ===
O'Sullivan had just turned 18 when he was first selected for the Imokilly divisional team. He was a regular in the half-back line throughout the 1996 championship and was at left wing-back when Imokilly drew with Avondhu in the final on 22 September 1996. A fortnight later he was selected in the same position for the replay which Imokilly lost by 0-13 to 1-08.

O'Sullivan was again selected at left wing-back the following year. On 5 October 1997, he won a Cork Senior Championship medal after a 1-18 to 2-12 defeat of Sarsfields in the final.

=== Cork ===
==== Minor and under-21 ====
In spite of Harty Cup success as well as being added to the Cloyne intermediate team, O'Sullivan was disappointed not to be selected for the Cork minor team in 1995. He later said: "I was overlooked...it was a fair kick. I was disappointed. I suppose when you look back there's always some bit of politics. Somebody looking after their own." O'Sullivan was called up to the minor panel the following year, making his only appearance on 26 June 1996 in a 0-16 to 1-09 defeat by Tipperary in the Munster Minor Hurling Championship.

O'Sullivan subsequently progressed onto the Cork under-21 team and won a Munster Championship medal at full-back on 30 July 1997 following a 1-11 to 0-13 defeat of Tipperary. He was at full-back again for the subsequent 3-11 to 0-13 All-Ireland final defeat of Galway on 21 October.

On 23 August 1998, O'Sullivan won a second successive Munster Championship medal after a 3-18 to 1-10 defeat of Tipperary in the final. He later won a second successive All-Ireland Championship medal at full-back on 20 September after a 2-15 to 2-10 defeat of Galway.

==== Senior ====
O'Sullivan was just eighteen-years-old when he made his first appearance for the Cork senior team on 23 March 1997. He was selected at left corner-back for the 4-21 to 2-11 defeat of Antrim in the National Hurling League. O'Sullivan was later selected at left corner-back for Cork's 12-19 to 0-18 Munster Championship defeat by Clare on 8 June. At the end of the season he was regarded as unlucky not to have been nominated for an All-Star.

O'Sullivan was appointed captain of the Cork senior team for the 1998 season. On 17 May 1998, he captained the team to the National League title following a 2-14 to 0-13 defeat of Waterford in the final.

In 1999 O'Sullivan was switched to the full-back position for the championship. On 4 July, he won his first Munster Championship medal after a 1-15 to 0-14 defeat of reigning champions Clare. On 11 September, O'Sullivan was at full-back for the All-Ireland final against Kilkenny which Cork won by 0-12 to 0-11. He was later honoured with his first All-Star award, while he was also named as the Young Hurler of the Year.

On 3 July 2000, O'Sullivan lined out in his second Munster final. He was described as "majestic" at full-back and was instrumental in saving a Tommy Dunne penalty in the 0-23 to 3-12 defeat of Tipperary. O'Sullivan ended the year with a second successive All-Star.

On 5 May 2002, O'Sullivan scored a 65-metre free in Cork's 2-15 to 2-14 defeat by Kilkenny in the National League final. Later that season he became a dual player when he was selected for the Cork Gaelic football team. He made his first appearance at right corner-forward on 16 June in an 0-08 apiece draw with Kerry in the Munster Championship. O'Sullivan won a Munster Championship medal on 21 July after being introduced as a substitute in Cork's 1-23 to 0-07 defeat of Tipperary in the final replay. On 29 November, O'Sullivan and six of his teammates from the Cork hurling panel held a press conference at the Imperial Hotel to announce that all 30 members of the panel were withdrawing their services from the county in the hope of better treatment from the county board. He remained a high-profile representative at the negotiations over the following two weeks and was one of five Cork senior football representatives who agreed to a settlement with the county board on 13 December.

O'Sullivan lined out in his third Munster final on 29 June 2003. As full-back he marked John Mullane but was substituted with Mark Prendergast after fifteen minutes. Cork won the game by 3-16 to 3-12 with O'Sullivan winning his third Munster Championship medal. On 14 September, he was at full-back for Cork's 1-14 to 1-11 All-Ireland final defeat by Kilkenny. O'Sullivan ended the season by being nominated for an All-Star, but lost out to Kilkenny's Noel Hickey for the full-back berth.

On 27 June 2004, O'Sullivan lost his first Munster final when Waterford defeated Cork by 3-16 to 1-21. In spite of this defeat, Cork later qualified for the All-Ireland final against Kilkenny. A 0-17 to 0-09 victory gave O'Sullivan a second All-Ireland medal. He ended the season by being named in the full-back position on the All-Stars team.

O'Sullivan won his fourth Munster Championship medal on 26 June 2005 after a 1-21 to 1-16 defeat of Tipperary in the final at Páirc Uí Chaoimh. On 11 September 2005, Cork faced Galway in the All-Ireland final for the first time since 1990. O'Sullivan was in his usual position of full-back, and proved effective in nullifying the threat of Niall Healy who was substituted in the 56th minute. Cork won the game by 1-21 to 1-16, with O'Sullivan collecting a third All-Ireland medal. He ended the season by winning a second successive All-Star, his fourth overall, in the full-back position.

On 25 June 2006, O'Sullivan won his fifth Munster Championship medal after a 2-14 to 1-14 defeat of Tipperary for the second consecutive year. Cork subsequently qualified for a fourth successive All-Ireland final, with Kilkenny providing the opposition for the third time. O'Sullivan received an early yellow card for an off-the-ball incident with Martin Comerford, while in the 29th minute he failed to deal with a high ball which bounced out of his hand towards Aidan Fogarty and a goal was conceded. Cork eventually lost the game by 1-16 to 1-13. He ended the season by being nominated for another All-Star, but lost out to J. J. Delaney.

On 27 May 2007, O'Sullivan was at the centre of what came to be known as "Semplegate". Prior to the start of the Munster Championship meeting between Cork and Clare at Semple Stadium, a number of players from both teams clashed as they emerged from the tunnel at the same time with the fighting spilling onto the pitch in front of a number of children who had formed a guard of honour. At a subsequent meeting of the GAA's Central Hearings Committee, Cork players Seán Óg Ó hAilpín, Donal Óg Cusack and O'Sullivan were served with a month-long suspension for their participation in the melee. The three players were later restored to the starting fifteen, however, Cork's championship campaign ended with an All-Ireland quarter-final replay defeat by Waterford.

For the second time in six years, the Cork senior hurling team withdrew their services in sympathy with the Cork senior football team who had also refused to play due to the appointment of Teddy Holland as team manager and the changing of the rules regarding the selection committee. Because of this, O'Sullivan and his teammates failed to fulfil their opening two fixtures in the 2008 National Hurling League. He was reinstated at full-back for Cork's subsequent championship campaign, but received harsh criticism for his performances. On 10 August 2008, O'Sullivan played his last championship game for Cork in an All-Ireland semi-final defeat by Kilkenny. His "cameo of redemption" was praised, with The Irish Times also describing O'Sullivan's performance as "his best display of the year". After the game O'Sullivan let emotions get the better of him and he was visibly distraught as he walked down the tunnel, gripping the crest on his jersey.

O'Sullivan missed Cork's National League campaign in 2009 due to the players withdrawing their services for the third time in seven years. The third strike was particularly difficult for O'Sullivan as his father, Jerry, was the chairman of the Cork County Board. On 12 May 2009, O'Sullivan announced his intention not to return to the Cork senior team for the championship. He later revealed that his decision was influenced by a new rule which made the wearing of helmets compulsory. O'Sullivan also revealed that he hinted to team manager Denis Walsh about a change of position from full-back. He stated: "After the game against Kilkenny last year, I didn't feel I could play again in the full back line. I told him this and I asked him if I could play a role somewhere else on the field and he said he would think about it. Which he did and he was honest and said he didn't think there was...I took a few hours to think about it but I had made up my mind after the Kilkenny game that full back was no more for me so I just had to stick by it."

== Coaching career ==
=== Cork ===
==== Under-16 ====
O'Sullivan began his inter-county coaching career in 2014 when he was appointed manager of the Cork under-16 development team. On 29 August 2015, he guided the team to an All-Ireland title after a 3-09 to 0-15 defeat of Kilkenny in the final at Semple Stadium.

==== Senior ====
On 16 October 2015, O'Sullivan became a selector with the Cork senior team under Kieran Kingston. His first season as part of the management team saw Cork lose all five of their group stage games in the National League before narrowly avoiding relegation with a 2-22 to 0-25 defeat of Galway in a play-off. Cork's subsequent championship campaign ended with a first defeat by Wexford in 60 years.

O'Sullivan's second season as a selector saw Cork reach the National League quarter-finals where they faced a 1-20 to 1-18 defeat by Limerick. On 9 July 2017, he was part of the management team that saw Cork win the Munster Championship after a 1-25 to 1-20 defeat of Clare in the final.

=== Ballygiblin ===
In 2018, O'Sullivan joined the management of the Ballygiblin junior team as trainer. On 1 September, Ballygiblin defeated Shanballymore by 1-15 to 0-12 to win the North Cork Championship.

== Career statistics ==
=== Club ===
As of 29 August 2020

| Team | Year | Cork IHC | |
| Team | Year | Apps | Score |
|---|---|---|---|
| Cloyne | 1995 | 2 | 0-00 |
| Cloyne | 1996 | 5 | 0-00 |
| Cloyne | 1997 | 4 | 0-02 |
| Cloyne | Total | 11 | 0-02 |
| Cloyne | Year | Cork SHC | |
| Cloyne | Year | Apps | Score |
| Cloyne | 1998 | 2 | 0-04 |
| Cloyne | 1999 | 1 | 1-02 |
| Cloyne | 2000 | 5 | 2-06 |
| Cloyne | 2001 | 2 | 0-04 |
| Cloyne | 2002 | 3 | 2-07 |
| Cloyne | 2003 | 5 | 0-01 |
| Cloyne | 2004 | 5 | 1-03 |
| Cloyne | 2005 | 5 | 1-07 |
| Cloyne | 2006 | 5 | 3-19 |
| Cloyne | 2007 | 2 | 0-06 |
| Cloyne | 2008 | 4 | 0-04 |
| Cloyne | 2009 | 3 | 3-13 |
| Cloyne | 2010 | 4 | 2-04 |
| Cloyne | 2011 | 6 | 1-11 |
| Cloyne | 2012 | 4 | 0-00 |
| Cloyne | Total | 56 | 16-91 |
| Cloyne | Year | Cork PIHC | |
| Cloyne | Year | Apps | Score |
| Cloyne | 2013 | 5 | 6-30 |
| Cloyne | 2014 | 4 | 4-18 |
| Cloyne | 2015 | 4 | 0-18 |
| Cloyne | 2016 | 5 | 0-06 |
| Cloyne | 2017 | 3 | 0-02 |
| Cloyne | 2018 | 2 | 1-02 |
| Cloyne | 2019 | 2 | 0-01 |
| Cloyne | Total | 25 | 11-77 |
| Cloyne | Year | Cork SAHC | |
| Cloyne | Year | Apps | Score |
| Cloyne | 2020 | 3 | 1-00 |
| Cloyne | Total | 3 | 1-00 |
| Career total | | 95 | 28-170 |

=== Inter-county ===
| Team | Year | National League | | | Munster | | All-Ireland | | Total | |
| Team | Year | Division | Apps | Score | Apps | Score | Apps | Score | Apps | Score |
|---|---|---|---|---|---|---|---|---|---|---|
| Cork | 1997 | Division 2 | 5 | 0-01 | 1 | 0-00 | — | | 6 | 0-01 |
| Cork | 1998 | Division 1B | 7 | 0-00 | 2 | 0-00 | — | | 9 | 0-00 |
| Cork | 1999 | Division 1B | 6 | 0-01 | 2 | 0-00 | 2 | 0-00 | 10 | 0-01 |
| Cork | 2000 | Division 1B | 6 | 0-00 | 3 | 0-00 | 1 | 0-00 | 10 | 0-00 |
| Cork | 2001 | Division 1B | 5 | 0-00 | 1 | 0-00 | — | | 6 | 0-00 |
| Cork | 2002 | Division 1B | 6 | 1-02 | 1 | 0-00 | 2 | 0-01 | 9 | 1-03 |
| Cork | 2003 | Division 1B | 2 | 0-00 | 2 | 0-01 | 3 | 0-00 | 7 | 0-01 |
| Cork | 2004 | Division 1B | 8 | 0-00 | 3 | 0-00 | 4 | 0-00 | 15 | 0-00 |
| Cork | 2005 | Division 1B | 3 | 0-00 | 2 | 0-01 | 3 | 0-00 | 8 | 0-01 |
| Cork | 2006 | Division 1A | 5 | 1-03 | 2 | 0-00 | 3 | 0-00 | 10 | 1-03 |
| Cork | 2007 | Division 1A | 5 | 0-02 | 1 | 0-00 | 5 | 0-00 | 11 | 0-02 |
| Cork | 2008 | Division 1A | 4 | 0-00 | 1 | 0-00 | 4 | 0-00 | 9 | 0-00 |
| Cork | 2009 | Division 1A | — | | — | | — | | — | |
| Career total | | | 62 | 2-09 | 21 | 0-02 | 27 | 0-01 | 110 | 2-12 |

== Honours ==
=== As a player ===
Midleton CBS

- Dr Harty Cup (1): 1995

Cloyne

- Cork Intermediate Hurling Championship (1): 1997

Imokilly

- Cork Senior Hurling Championship (1): 1997

Cork

- All-Ireland Senior Hurling Championship (3): 1999, 2004, 2005
- Munster Senior Hurling Championship (5): 1999, 2000, 2003, 2005, 2006
- Munster Senior Football Championship (1): 2002
- Munster Junior Football Championship (1): 2001
- National Hurling League (1): 1998 (c)
- All-Ireland Under-21 Hurling Championship (2): 1997, 1998
- Munster Under-21 Hurling Championship (2): 1997, 1998

Munster

- Railway Cup (1): 2000

Individual

- In May 2020, a public poll conducted by RTÉ.ie named O'Sullivan in the full-back line alongside Brians Lohan and Corcoran in a team of hurlers who had won All Stars during the era of The Sunday Game.

=== In management ===
Ballygiblin

- North Cork Junior A Hurling Championship (1): 2018

Cork

- Munster Senior Hurling Championship (1): 2017
- All-Ireland Under-16 Hurling Tournament (1): 2015

Sporting positions
| Preceded by Fergal McCormack | Cork Senior Hurling Captain; 1998 | Succeeded by Mark Landers |
Achievements
| Preceded by Stephen Byrne | Eircell Young Hurler of the Year; 1999 | Succeeded by Noel Hickey |
