= 1961 Cork Junior Hurling Championship =

Irish hurling competition

- Teams: 7
- Champions: Cloyne (2nd title)
- Runners-up: Kilworth

The 1961 Cork Junior Hurling Championship was the 64th staging of the Cork Junior Hurling Championship since its establishment by the Cork County Board in 1895.

The final, a replay, was played on 17 December 1961 at the Athletic Grounds in Cork, between Cloyne and Kilworth, in what was their first ever meeting in the final. Cloyne won the match by 4–06 to 2–04 to claim their second championship title overall and first championship title in 22 years.

== Results ==
=== Quarter-finals ===
`1 October 1961 Quarter-final	Cloyne	7-14 - 2-07	Tullylease	Cork Athletic Grounds

8 October 1961 Quarter-final	Kilworth	7-04 - 2-09	Ballinhassig	Bishop Casey Memorial Park

15 October 1961 Quarter-final	Nemo Rangers	5-11 - 5-05	Courcey Rovers	Ballymartle Grounds

=== Semi-finals ===
22 October 1961 Semi-final	Cloyne	7-08 - 0-01	Nemo Rangers	Riverstown Sportsfield

5 November 1961 Semi-final	Kilworth	7-06 - 6-09	Éire Óg	Cork Athletic Grounds

12 November 1961 Semi-final replay	Kilworth	6-09 - 5-06 (aet)	Éire Óg	Cork Athletic Grounds

=== Final ===
26 November 1961 Final	Cloyne	3-07 - 4-04	Kilworth	Cork Athletic Grounds

=== Final replay ===
17 December 1961 Final replay	Cloyne	4-06 - 2-04	Kilworth	Cork Athletic Grounds
