= John Anderson (hurler) =

Irish hurler

Personal information
- Native name: Seán Mac Aindriú (Irish)
- Born: 14 October 1977 (age 49) Blackpool, Cork, Ireland
- Occupation: Primary school teacher
- Height: 6 ft 0 in (183 cm)

Sport
- Sport: Hurling
- Position: Right wing-forward
Club*
Years	Club	Apps (scores)
1996-2012	Glen Rovers	41 (1-99)
Club titles
- Cork titles: 0
Inter-county**
Years	County	Apps (scores)
2003-2004	Cork	2 (0-03)
Inter-county titles
- Munster titles: 1
- All-Irelands: 1
- NHL: 0
- All Stars: 0
- * club appearances and scores correct as of 22:56, 3 April 2019. **Inter County team apps and scores correct as of 22:00, 3 April 2019.

John Anderson (born 14 October 1977) is an Irish retired hurler who played for Cork Senior Championship club Glen Rovers. He played for the Cork senior hurling team for two seasons, during which time he usually lined out as a right wing-forward.

Anderson began his hurling career at club level with Glen Rovers. He broke onto the club's senior team as an 18-year-old in 1996, having earlier enjoyed success in the Cork Under-21 Championship. Anderson made 41 championship appearances at senior level for the club before retiring from the game in 2012.

At inter-county level, Anderson was part of the successful Cork under-21 team that won back-to-back All-Ireland Championships in 1997 and 1998. He joined the Cork senior team in 2003. Throughout his inter-county career Anderson was better-known as a panellist rather than a member of the starting fifteen and made a combined total of five National League and Championship appearances in a career that ended with his last game in 2004. During that time he was a non-playing member of Cork's All-Ireland Championship-winning team in 2004. Anderson also secured a Munster Championship medal as a non-playing substitute.

== Playing career ==
=== Glen Rovers ===
Anderson joined the Glen Rovers club at a young age and played in all grades at juvenile and underage levels. On 12 November 1995, he was at midfield when Glen Rovers defeated Ballincollig by 2-14 to 1-14 to win the Cork Under-21 Championship.

Anderson was just out of the minor grade when he was added to the Glen Rovers senior team for the 1996 Cork Championship. He made his first appearance on 2 June in a 2-12 to 1-12 defeat of Midleton in the first round.

Anderson ended the 2004 Cork Championship as top scorer after recording a total of 0-47 from six games.

On 25 August 2012, Anderson played his last game at senior level for Glen Rovers. He lined out at left wing-forward in a 1-13 to 0-14 defeat by Carrigtwohill in the fourth round of the Cork Senior Championship.

=== Cork ===
==== Under-21 ====
Anderson first played for Cork as a member of the under-21 team during the 1997 Munster Championship. He made his first appearance on 17 July when he was introduced as a substitute in Cork's 2-13 to 1-14 defeat of Clare. Anderson won a Munster Championship medal as a non-playing substitute on 30 July following a 1-11 to 0-13 defeat of Tipperary in the final. He was a non-playing substitute once again for the subsequent 3-11 to 0-13 All-Ireland final defeat of Galway on 21 October.

Anderson became a member of the starting fifteen during the 1998 Munster Championship. On 23 August, he won a second successive Munster Championship medal from right wing-forward after a 3-18 to 1-10 defeat of Tipperary in the final. Anderson was dropped from the starting fifteen for the All-Ireland final against Galway on 20 September. He was introduced as a substitute and collected a second successive winners' medal after the 2-15 to 2-10 victory.

==== Senior ====
Anderson joined the Cork senior panel during the 2003 season. On 29 June he was a non-playing substitute when Cork defeated Waterford by 3-16 to 3-12 to win the Munster Championship. On 14 September, Anderson was also a non-playing substitute for Cork's 1-14 to 1-11 All-Ireland final defeat by Kilkenny.

Anderson made his first appearance for the Cork senior team on 24 April 2004. He scored two points from right wing-forward in a 2-20 to 0-18 defeat by Clare in the National League. Anderson made his first championship appearance on 16 May when he was introduced as a substitute in Cork's 4-19 to 1-07 defeat of Kerry in the Munster Championship. On 12 September, he was an unused substitute when Cork defeated Kilkenny by 0-17 to 0-09 in the All-Ireland final. Anderson was released from the panel after the championship.

== Career statistics ==
=== Club ===
Team	Year	Cork SHC	
Team	Year	Apps	Score
Glen Rovers	1996	1	0-00
Glen Rovers	1997	1	0-01
Glen Rovers	1998	5	0-09
Glen Rovers	1999	2	0-02
Glen Rovers	2000	2	0-03
Glen Rovers	2001	1	0-01
Glen Rovers	2002	3	0-08
Glen Rovers	2003	2	0-02
Glen Rovers	2004	6	0-47
Glen Rovers	2005	1	0-06
Glen Rovers	2006	2	1-14
Glen Rovers	2007	2	0-00
Glen Rovers	2008	5	0-02
Glen Rovers	2009	4	0-02
Glen Rovers	2010	0	0-00
Glen Rovers	2011	0	0-00
Glen Rovers	2012	4	0-02
Career total		41	1-99

=== Inter-county ===
Team	Year	National League			Munster		All-Ireland		Total	
Team	Year	Division	Apps	Score	Apps	Score	Apps	Score	Apps	Score
Cork	2003	Division 1B	0	0-00	0	0-00	0	0-00	0	0-00
Cork	2004	Division 1B	1	0-02	1	0-01	1	0-02	3	0-05
Career total			1	0-02	1	0-01	1	0-02	3	0-05

== Honours ==
Glen Rovers

- Cork Under-21 Hurling Championship (1): 1995

Cork

- All-Ireland Senior Hurling Championship (1): 2004
- Munster Senior Hurling Championship (1): 2003
- All-Ireland Under-21 Hurling Championship (2): 1997, 1998
- Munster Under-21 Hurling Championship (2): 1997, 1998
