= Paudie O'Sullivan =

Irish hurler

Personal information
- Native name: Pádraig Ó Súilleabháin (Irish)
- Nickname: Pebbles
- Born: 28 November 1988 (age 37) Cork, Ireland
- Occupation: Electrician
- Height: 1.81 m (5 ft 11 in)

Sport
- Sport: Hurling
- Position: Full-forward
Clubs*
Years	Club	Apps (scores)
2004–present 2015–present	Cloyne; Imokilly	36 (15–141); 24 (15–74)
Club titles
- Cork titles: 3
Inter-county**
Years	County	Apps (scores)
2007–2016	Cork	26 (6–30)
Inter-county titles
- Munster titles: 1
- All-Irelands: 0
- NHL: 0
- All Stars: 0
- * club appearances and scores correct as of 20:29, 20 October 2019. **Inter County team apps and scores correct as of 23:40, 15 January 2019.

Paudie O'Sullivan (born 28 November 1988) is an Irish hurler who plays for Cork Premier Championship club Cloyne and Cork Senior Championship division Imokilly. He usually plays as a full-forward. O'Sullivan is a former member of the Cork senior hurling team.

O'Sullivan's brother, Diarmuid, is a three-time All-Ireland medalist with Cork, while his father, Jerry, has filled a number of important administrative roles with the Cork County Board and the Munster Council.

== Playing career ==
=== Midleton CBS ===
O'Sullivan played in all grades of hurling with Midleton CBS Secondary School before progressing onto the college's senior team. On 12 March 2006, he scored a point from centre-back when Midelton CBS defeated St Flannan's College from Ennis by 2–08 to 0–12 to win the Harty Cup.

=== Cloyne ===
O'Sullivan plays his club hurling and Gaelic football with Cloyne.

In 2004 he was just fifteen years-old when he made his debut with the club's senior team. The following three years proved difficult for Cloyne as the club became the first team in over sixty years to lose three successive senior championship deciders. In spite of these defeats O'Sullivan was regularly one of the top scorers in the championship.

After capturing three successive divisional junior football championship medals between 2008 and 2010, O'Sullivan's side reached the county decider at the third attempt. A narrow 0–10 to 0–9 defeat of White's Cross gave him a championship medal.

=== Imokilly ===
O' Sullivan also played with the Imokilly division. He won Cork Senior Hurling Championship titles in 2017, 2018, 2019.

=== Cork ===
==== Minor and under-21 ====
O'Sullivan was sixteen-years-old when he first played for Cork as a member of the minor team on 1 April 2005. He scored two goals on his debut in a 4–28 to 0-01 Munster Championship defeat of Kerry. O'Sullivan was later switched from the forwards to centre-back and won a Munster Championship medal on 26 June after a 2–18 to 1–12 defeat of Limerick in the final.

On 25 June 2006, O'Sullivan scored a point from left wing-back when Cork defeated Tipperary by 2–20 to 1–15 to win a second successive Munster Championship title.

O'Sullivan subsequently progressed onto the Cork under-21 team. He made his first appearance on 20 July 2008 in a 1–20 to 1–11 defeat by Clare in the Munster Championship. His tenure in the under-21 grade ended without silverware following a 2–22 to 0–25 defeat by Tipperary on 3 June 2009.

==== Senior ====
O'Sullivan made his first appearance for the Cork senior hurling team on 18 February 2007 in a 1–21 to 0-14 National Hurling League defeat of Offaly. On 11 May, a scan revealed that O'Sullivan had ruptured a cruciate ligament and was ruled out for the rest of the season.

O'Sullivan returned to the Cork senior panel during the 2008 National League before making his first Munster Championship appearance on 8 June 2008 in a 1–19 to 1–13 defeat by Tipperary.

Two months before Cork's opening championship game in 2013, O'Sullivan suffered a serious leg break in a club match which ruled him out for the rest of the season. After a fourteen-month lay-off O'Sullivan returned to inter-county action. He was introduced as a second-half substitute and scored a point inside ten seconds in Cork's 0–28 to 0-14 Munster quarter-final replay defeat of Waterford. O'Sullivan later made a similar cameo appearance during the provincial decider. A personal tally of 1-1, together with a goal from Séamus Harnedy, gave Cork a 2–24 to 0–24 victory over Limerick. It was O'Sullivan's first Munster medal.

=== Munster ===
O'Sullivan also had the honour of being picked for Munster in the inter-provincial series of games. He won an Interprovincial Championship medal in 2013 as Munster defeated Connacht by 1–22 to 0–15.

== Career statistics ==
=== Club ===
As of 19 September 2021

Team	Year	Cork SHC	
Team	Year	Apps	Score
Cloyne	2004	5	2-10
Cloyne	2005	5	3-19
Cloyne	2006	5	4-25
Cloyne	2007	—	
Cloyne	2008	4	1-19
Cloyne	2009	3	0-09
Cloyne	2010	4	2-17
Cloyne	2011	6	1-33
Cloyne	2012	4	2-09
Cloyne	Total	36	15-141
Cloyne	Year	Cork PIHC	
Cloyne	Year	Apps	Score
Cloyne	2013	—	
Cloyne	2014	4	0-11
Cloyne	2015	4	1-12
Cloyne	2016	5	1-15
Cloyne	2017	4	0-21
Cloyne	2018	2	1-05
Cloyne	2019	2	0-04
Cloyne	Total	21	3-68
Cloyne	Year	Cork SAHC	
Cloyne	Year	Apps	Score
Cloyne	2020	3	1-04
Cloyne	2021	2	1-04
Cloyne	Total	5	2-08
Career total		62	20-217

=== Division ===
As of match played 20 October 2019.

Team	Year	Cork SHC	
Team	Year	Apps	Score
Imokilly	2015	4	1-23
Imokilly	2016	4	3-15
Imokilly	2017	7	3-18
Imokilly	2018	4	7-09
Imokilly	2019	5	1-09
Career total		24	15-74

=== Inter-county ===
Team	Year	National League			Munster		All-Ireland		Total	
Team	Year	Division	Apps	Score	Apps	Score	Apps	Score	Apps	Score
Cork	2007	Division 1A	2	0-01	—		—		2	0-01
Cork	2008	Division 1A	1	0-04	1	0-01	1	0-00	3	0-05
Cork	2009	Division 1	3	1-00	1	0-00	0	0-00	4	1-00
Cork	2010	Division 1	5	0-03	4	1-04	2	0-03	11	1-10
Cork	2011	Division 1	7	0-08	1	0-01	3	4-05	11	4-14
Cork	2012	Division 1A	7	3-06	1	0-03	4	0-07	12	3-16
Cork	2013	Division 1A	6	1-06	—		—		6	1-06
Cork	2014	Division 1B	—		3	1-04	1	0-00	4	1-04
Cork	2015	Division 1A	6	4-03	1	0-00	3	0-02	10	4-05
Cork	2016	Division 1A	5	1-02	—		—		5	1-02
Total			42	10-33	12	2-13	14	4-17	68	15-63

=== Inter-provincial ===
Team	Year	Railway Cup	
Team	Year	Apps	Score
Munster	2013	2	2-04
Total		2	2-04

== Honours ==
Midleton CBS

- Dr Harty Cup (1): 2006

Cloyne

- Cork Junior Football Championship (1): 2010
- East Cork Junior A Football Championship (3): 2008, 2009, 2010

Imokilly

- Cork Senior Hurling Championship (3): 2017, 2018, 2019

Cork

- Munster Senior Hurling Championship (1): 2014
- Munster Minor Hurling Championship (2): 2005, 2006

Munster

- Inter-provincial Championship (1): 2013
