= 2006 Cork Senior Hurling Championship =

Annual hurling competition season

- Dates: 26 April 2006 – 22 October 2006
- Teams: 24
- Sponsor: Evening Echo
- Champions: Erin's Own (2nd title); Timmy Kelleher (captain); Martin Bowen (manager)
- Runners-up: Cloyne; Diarmuid O'Sullivan (captain); Seán Motherway (manager)
- Relegated: Delaneys

Tournament statistics
- Matches played: 38
- Goals scored: 88 (2.32 per match)
- Points scored: 976 (25.68 per match)
- Top scorer(s): Paudie O'Sullivan (4-25)

The 2006 Cork Senior Hurling Championship was the 118th staging of the Cork Senior Hurling Championship since its establishment by the Cork County Board in 1887. The draw for the 2006 Round 1 fixtures took place on 11 December 2005. The championship began on 26 April 2006 and ended on 22 October 2006.

Newtownshandrum were the defending champions, however, they were defeated by Cloyne at the semi-final stage.

On 22 October 2006, Erin's Own won the championship following a 2–19 to 3–14 defeat of Cloyne in the final. This was their second championship title overall ad their first title since 1992.

Cloyne's Paudie O'Sullivan was the championship's top scorer with 4-25.

== Teams ==
=== Changes ===
==== To Championship ====
Promoted from the Cork Premier Intermediate Hurling Championship

- Ballinhassig

==== From Championship ====
Declined to field a team

- Seandún

=== Personnel and general information ===
Team	Colours	Manager(s)	Captain	Last win
Avondhu	Yellow and black	Joe O'Brien	Will Twomey	1996
Ballinhassig	Blue and white	Peter Brennan; Diarmuid Coleman	Martin Coleman	
Blackrock	Green and yellow	Dave Keane	Alan Browne	2002
Bride Rovers	Green, white and gold	Jack Russell	Brendan Walsh	
Carrigdhoun	Red and white			
Castlelyons	Green and gold	John Molloy	Finnan Waters	
Carbery	Purple and yellow			1994
Cork Institute of Technology	Red and white	John Meyler; Keith Ricken		
Cloyne	Red and black	Seán Motherway	Diarmuid O'Sullivan	
Delanys	Green, white and gold	Martin Knox	Mark O'Driscoll	
Douglas	Green, while and black	John Horgan		
Duhallow	Orange and black	Ger Ahern		
Erin's Own	Blue and red	Martin Bowen	Timmy Kelleher	1992
Glen Rovers	Green, yellow and black	Tomás Mulcahy	Paddy Cunningham	1989
Imokilly	Red and white	Ronan Dwane	Ger O'Leary	1998
Killeagh	Green and white	Teddy McCarthy	Bugsy Barry	
Midleton	Black and white	Seán O'Brien	Alan Cahill	1991
Muskerry	Green and white	Mark Kenny		
Na Piarsaigh	Yellow and black	Christy Connery	Dave Gardiner	1995
Newtownshandrum	Green and yellow	Simon Morrissey	Phil Noonan	2005
Sarsfields	Blue, white and black	John Barry		1957
St. Catherine's	Purple and yellow	Gerry Fitzgerald	Junior Sheehan	
St. Finbarr's	Blue and gold	Jimmy Barry-Murphy	Kevin Murray	1993
University College Cork	Black and red	Paddy Crowley	Dara McSweeney	1970

== Results ==
=== Round 1 ===
5 May 2006 Round 1	Newtownshandrum	1-09 - 0-09	Bride Rovers	Castletownroche
	Jerry O'Connor 0-5, AT O'Brien 1-0, JP King 0-3, P Mulcahy 0-1.		J O'Driscoll 0-5, T Broderick 0-1, P Murphy 0-1, B Johnson 0-1, S Ryan 0-1.	Referee: G Harrington (Carrigaline)

6 May 2006 Round 1	Erin's Own	1-13 - 1-07	Sarsfields	Páirc Uí Rinn, Cork
	K Murphy 0-5, E Murphy 0-4, F Murphy 1-0, B Corcoran 0-2, S Cronin 0-1, S Bowen 0-1.		B McCarthy 1-0, J Murphy 0-2, P Ryan 0-2, M Cussen 0-2, G O'Loughlin 0-1.

6 May 2006 Round 1	Ballinhassig	0-12 - 0-12	Na Piarsaigh	Páirc Uí Rinn, Cork
	D Dineen 0-8, D O'Sullivan 0-1, P O'Sullivan 0-1, S Dineen 0-1, F O'Leary 0-1.		SR O'Sullivan 0-6, J Gardiner 0-2, C O'Sullivan 0-1, SP O'Sullivan 0-1, S Óg Ó hAilpín 0-1, R Healy 0-1.

6 May 2006 Round 1	St. Catherine's	2-06 - 2-13	St. Finbarr's	Páirc Mac Gearailt, Fermoy
	S Kearney 1-0, P Cotter 1-0, S Cotter 0-2, J Sheean 0-2, Junior Sheehan 0-1, B Hogan 0-1.		K Murray 1-6, C McCarthy 1-2, R O'Mahony 0-2, B O'Driscoll 0-2, M Ryan 0-1.

7 May 2006 Round 1	Glen Rovers	1-15 - 0-08	Delaneys	Church Road, Blackrock
	J Anderson 1-8, S Kennefick 0-2, S McGrath 0-2, K O'Callaghan 0-1, D Dorris 0-1, P Horgan 0-1.		B Egan 0-5, M O'Driscoll 0-1, M McElhinney 0-1, J Egan 0-1.

7 May 2006 Round 1	Cloyne	4-10 - 3-06	Killeagh	St. Catherine's GAA Grounds, Ballynoe
	P O'Sullivan 1-5, P Cahill 2-1, C Cusack 1-0, Diarmuid O'Sullivan 0-3, J Cotter 0-1.		J Deane 1-1, L Collins 1-1, M Landers 1-0, Brendan Barry 0-1, Brian Barry 0-1, K Lane 0-1, D Kelleher 0-1.	Referee: D Kirwan (Éire Óg)

10 May 2006 Round 1 replay	Ballinhassig	2-16 - 1-15	Na Piarsaigh	Páirc Uí Rinn, Cork
	D Dineen 0-9, M Coleman 1-2, D Duggan 1-1, F O'Leary 0-2, D O'Callaghan 0-1, J Mullaney 0-1.		J Gardiner 0-6, SR O'Sullivan 1-2, SP O'Sullivan 0-2, C O'Sullivan 0-1, E Nodwell 0-1, R Healy 0-1, M Prendergats 0-1, S Óg Ó hAilpín 0-1.	Referee: J Sexton (Ballyhea)

10 May 2006 Round 1	Blackrock	0-14 - 0-10	Castleyons	Caherlag
	A Coughlan 0-11, B Hennebry 0-2, A Browne 0-1.		Eoin Fitzgerald 0-4, L Sexton 0-2, S Barrett 0-2, J McCarthy 0-1, Eamon Fitzgerald 0-1.	Referee: K Healy (Ballymartle)

12 May 2006 Round 1	Midleton	3-13 - 1-12	Douglas	Carrigtwohill
	M O'Connell 0-9, S Hennessy 1-1, D Ryan 1-0, A Cotter 1-0, K Ryan 0-2, G Manley 0-1.		G Wade 1-4, S Moylan 0-4, G McLoughlin 0-2, M Harrington 0-1, J Moylan 0-1.	Referee: P Downey (Inniscarra)

=== Round 2 ===
1 June 2006 Round 2	Delanys	1-10 - 1-13	Bride Rovers	Caherlag
	M McElhinney 1-2, B Egan 0-5, J Egan 0-3.		J O'Driscoll 0-8, S Ryan 1-0, R Cahill 0-3, P Murphy 0-1, P Johnson 0-1.	Referee: D Kirwan (Éire Óg)

4 June 2006 Round 2	St. Catherine's	0-17 - 0-16	Killeagh	Youghal
	S Cotter 0-7, K Morrison 0-3, S Kearney 0-3, R O'Connell 0-2, P Cotter 0-1, N O'Brien 0-1.		J Deane 0-9, Brendan Barry 0-3, Brian Barry 0-1, M Landers 0-1, P McGrath 0-1, J O'Connor 0-1.	Referee: J Sexton (Ballyhea)

4 June 2006 Round 2	Douglas	0-16 - 2-03	Castlelyons	Caherlag
	S Moylan 0-6, G Wade 0-6, M Harrington 0-2, B Fitzgerald 0-1, C Dineen 0-1.		Eoin Fitzgerald 2-1, T McCarthy 0-2.	Referee: G Harrington (Carrigaline)

10 June 2006 Round 2	Na Piarsaigh	0-09 - 2-12	Sarsfields	Páirc Uí Rinn, Cork
	SP O'Sullivan 0-3, E Nodwell 0-2, T Ó hAilpín 0-2, SR O'Sullivan 0-1, R McGregor 0-1.		T Óg Murphy 2-2, P Ryan 0-6, M Cussen 0-2, G O'Loughlin 0-1, J Murphy 0-1.	Referee: D Copps (Ballyhea)

=== Relegation section ===
30 June 2006 Semi-final	Killeagh	1-14 - 0-11	Castlelyons	Carrigtwohill
	J Deane 0-9, L Collins 1-0, B Barry 0-3, C Crowley 0-1, M Landers 0-1.		E Fitzgerald 0-7, S Barrett 0-2, B Fitzgerald 0-1.	Referee: D Copps (Ballyhea)

5 July 2006 Semi-final	Na Piarsaigh	3-19 - 2-06	Delaneys	Páirc Uí Rinn, Cork
	SP O'Sullivan 2-5, E Nodwell 0-7, G Shaw 1-1, J Gardiner 0-3, SR O'Sullivan 0-2, C O'Sullivan 0-1.		J Egan 0-5, G Healy 1-0, McElhinney 1-0, T Kiely 0-1.	Referee: C Lyons (Nemo Rangers)

16 September 2006 Final	Delaneys	0-06 - 0-14	Castlelyons	Clonmult Memorial Park, Midleton
	J Egan 0-2, K Foley 0-2, M O'Driscoll 0-1, G Healy 0-1.		T McCarthy 0-11, C McGann 0-2, W Martin 0-1.	Referee: D Copps (Ballyhea)

=== Divisional/colleges section ===
25 April 2006 Round 1	Carrigdhoun	0-14 - 1-21	University College Cork	Shanbally
	S Corcoran 0-4, N Murphy 0-4, C O'Sullivan 0-3, B Sweeney 0-1, J Murphy 0-1, D McCarthy 0-1.		J Crowley 1-3, R Conway 0-5, R Flannery 0-5, E Hanley 0-3, T Kenny 0-2, R O'Brien 0-2, S Murphy 0-1.	Referee: N Barrett (Carrigtwohill)

30 April 2006 Round 1	Cork Institute of Technology	4-14 - 2-20	Avondhu	Rathcormac
	M O'Sullivan 1-9, J Dixon 3-0, E Chawke 0-1, A Fleming 0-1, A O'Sullivan 0-1, M O'Connor 0-1, B O'Dwyer 0-1.		N Ronan 2-8, P O'Brien 0-4, J Mulchinock 0-2, B Coleman 0-2, T O'Riordan 0-2, J O'Callaghan 0-2.

10 May 2006 Round 1	Duhallow	2-16 - 1-10	Carbery	Coachford
	D Crowley 1-6, N O'Callaghan 1-1, B Quirke 0-2, A Sheehy 0-2, D Murphy 0-2, D Broderick 0-2, P O'Callaghan 0-1.		JP O'Callaghan 1-3, J Hickey 0-3, J Hickey 0-2, D Doody 0-1, N Cronin 0-1.	Referee: J Dorgan (Nemo Rangers)

1 June 2006 Round 1 replay	Cork Institute of Technology	1-15 - 0-15	Avondhu	Moore Park, Kilworth
	M O'Sullivan 0-10, A Nash 1-0, E Manning 0-2, J Griffen 0-2, E Chawke 0-1.		N Ronan 0-5, J O'Callaghan 0-4, P O'Brien 0-2, J Mulchinock 0-2, T Healy 0-1, M Allen 0-1.	Referee: C Lyons (Nemo Rangers)

2 June 2006 Round 1	Imokilly	2-18 - 3-12	Muskerry	Riverstick
	P O'Neill 2-1, T O'Keeffe 0-7, J Barrett 0-5, N McCarthy 0-2, E O'Loughlin 0-1, S O'Callaghan 0-1, B Morrissey 0-1.		J Hurley 1-5, T O'Mahony 1-1, R Byrne 1-0, J O'Driscoll 0-2, J Russell 0-1, M McCarthy 0-1, G Burke 0-1, K Walsh 0-1.	Referee: J Kearney (Na Piarsaigh)

=== Round 3 ===
1 July 2006 Round 3	St. Finbarr's	1-14 - 1-16	Bride Rovers	Páirc Uí Chaoimh, Cork
	K Murray 0-8, R O'Mahony 1-2, G McCarthy 0-2, C McCarthy 0-1, R Curran 0-1.		J O'Driscoll 0-7, R Cahill 1-1, B Johnson 0-3, T Broderick 0-2, S Ryan 0-2, P Murphy 0-1.	Referee: J Sexton (Ballyhea)

1 July 2006 Round 3	Newtownshandrum	3-19 - 1-08	Ballinhassig	Páirc Uí Chaoimh, Cork
	B O'Connor 1-7, J Bowles 1-3, C Naughton 1-0, JP King 0-3, R Clifford 0-2, M Farrell 0-1, J O'Connor 0-1, S O'Riordan 0-1.		F O'Leary 0-4, M Coleman 1-0, D Dineen 0-3, D O'Sullivan 0-1.	Referee: C Lyons (Nemo Rangers)

1 July 2006 Round 3	Erin's Own	2-15 - 3-08	Douglas	Riverstown
	E Murphy 0-6, F Murphy 1-1, K Murphy 0-4, B Corcoran 1-0, R Carroll 0-1, S Cronin 0-1, P Kelly 0-1, C O'Connor 0-1.		G Wade 1-4, S Moylan 1-1, B Ryan 1-0, P Barry 0-1, W Coveney 0-1, M Harrington 0-1.	Referee: K Healy (Ballymartle)

2 July 2006 Round 3	Cloyne	3-16 - 0-14	Glen Rovers	Páirc Uí Chaoimh, Cork
	C Cusack 2-2, P O'Sullivan 0-5, Diarmuid O'Sullivan 0-4, P Cahill 1-0, M Naughton 0-3, J Cotter 0-1, J Nyhan 0-1.		J Anderson 0-6, G Callanan 0-3, K O'Callaghan 0-3, P Horgan 0-1, D Dorris 0-1.	Referee: J Sexton (Ballyhea)

2 July 2006 Round 3	Blackrock	0-14 - 1-11	Midleton	Páirc Uí Chaoimh, Cork
	A Coughlan 0-7, B O'Keeffe 0-3, A Browne 0-2, D Cashman 0-1, J Young 0-1.		M O'Connell 0-7, J Keane 1-0, D Cott 0-2, K Ryan 0-1, S Hennessy 0-1.	Referee: D Copps (Ballyhea)

5 July 2006 Round 3	University College Cork	1-13 - 1-14	Sarsfields	Páirc Uí Rinn, Cork
	R Flannery 1-3, J Crowley 0-4, S Murphy 0-2, P O'Brien 0-2, R Crowley 0-1, T Kenny 0-1.		R Murphy 1-3, J Murphy 0-6, P Ryan 0-3, M Cussen 0-1, T Óg Murphy 0-1.	Referee: J Harrington (Carrigaline)

8 July 2006 Round 3	St. Catherine's	2-14 - 0-09	Duhallow	Fr. Con Buckley Park, Buttevant
	S Cotter 0-5, K Morrison 1-1, R O'Connell 0-4, Johnny Sheehan 1-0, S Kearney 0-2, P Cotter 0-1, N O'Brien 0-1.		D McCarthy 0-3, S Whelan 0-3, M Sheehy 0-1, B Sheehan 0-1, P O'Callaghan 0-1.	Referee: J Secton (Ballyhea)

8 July 2006 Round 3 replay	Blackrock	0-10 - 0-12 (aet)	Midleton	Páirc Uí Chaoimh, Cork
	C O'Leary 0-5, A Coughlan 0-3, B O'Keeffe 0-1, D Cashman 0-1.		M O'Connell 0-7, A O'Connor 0-2, S Hennessy 0-1, D Cott 0-1, J Keane 0-1.	Referee: D Kirwan (Éire Óg)

24 July 2006 Round 3	Cork Institute of Technology	1-14 - 1-14	Imokilly	Páirc Uí Rinn, Cork
	R Butler 1-2, M O'Sullivan 0-5, K Canty 0-2, E Manning 0-1, J Dixon 0-1, M Dunne 0-1, V Hurley 0-1.		T O'Keeffe 0-7, P O'Neill 1-1, J Barrett 0-2, S O'Callaghan 0-1, G O'Leary 0-1, B Coleman 0-1, N McCarthy 0-1.	Referee: J Dorgan (Nemo Rangers)

10 September 2006 Round 3 replay	Cork Institute of Technology	0-13 - 1-18	Imokilly	Páirc Uí Rinn, Cork
	M O'Sullivan 0-8, V Hurley 0-1, F Flannery 0-1, K Canty 0-1, E Chawke 0-1, M Dunne 0-1.		T O'Keeffe 0-9, P O'Neill 1-1, B Morrissey 0-2, L Desmond 0-2, B Coleman 0-1, J Barrett 0-1, S O'Farrell 0-1, B Ring 0-1.	Referee: D Farrell (Mitchelstown)

=== Quarter-finals ===
23 September 2006 Quarter-final	Sarsfields	1-19 - 0-13	St. Catherine's	Páirc Uí Chaoimh, Cork
	P Barry 1-4, P Ryan 0-6, J Murphy 0-4, B McCarthy 0-1, T Óg Murphy 0-1, K Murphy 0-1, G McCarthy 0-1, M Cussen 0-1.		J Sheehan 0-4, K Morrison 0-3, S Cotter 0-3, N O'Brien 0-2, S Kearney 0-1.	Referee: J Sexton (Ballyhea)

23 September 2006 Quarter-final	Newtownshandrum	1-14 - 0-15	Imokilly	Páirc Uí Chaoimh, Cork
	B O'Connor 0-8, J Bowles 1-0, C Naughten 0-2, R Clifford 0-2, Jerry O'Connor 0-2.		B Ring 0-3, L Desmon 0-3, N McCarthy 0-3, T O'Keeffe 0-3, B Coleman 0-2, J Barrett 0-1.	Referee: A Cummins (Ballymartle)

24 September 2006 Quarter-final	Cloyne	5-15 - 1-12	Midleton	Páirc Uí Chaoimh, Cork
	Diarmuid O'Sullivan 3-7, P O'Sullivan 1-3, C Cusack 1-1, M Naughton 0-3, C O'Sullivan 0-1.		M O'Connell 0-11, S Hennessy 1-0, D Cott 0-1.	Referee: D Kirwam (Éire Óg)

24 September 2006 Quarter-final	Bride Rovers	0-08 - 2-15	Erin's Own	Páirc Uí Chaoimh, Cork
	B Johnson 0-5, Jerome O'Driscoll 0-2, S Ryan 0-1.		E Murphy 0-6, F Murphy 1-2, C Coakley 1-1, K Murphy 0-3, B Corcoran 0-1, M Buckley 0-1, M O'Connor 0-1.	Referee: C Lyons (Nemo Rangers)

=== Semi-finals ===
8 October 2006 Semi-final	Erin's Own	1-11 - 0-08	Sarsfields	Páirc Uí Chaoimh, Cork
	E Murphy 0-5 (0-4 frees); M O’Connor 1-0; F Murphy, M Buckley 0-2 each; R Carroll, K Murphy (free) 0-1 each.	Report	J Murphy (0-1 free), P Ryan (0-1 free, 0-1 65) 0-2 each; B McCarthy, T Óg Murphy, K Murphy, P Barry 0-1 each.	Referee: D Copps (Ballyhea)

8 October 2006 Semi-final	Cloyne	0-02 - 0-01	Newtownshandrum	Páirc Uí Chaoimh, Cork

15 October 2006 Semi-final refixture	Cloyne	2-09 - 0-13	Newtownshandrum	Páirc Uí Chaoimh, Cork
	P O’Sullivan 1-4 (0-3 frees); P Cahill 1-1; D O’Sullivan and C Cusack 0-2 each.	Report	B O’Connor 0-6 (0-3 frees, 0-1 sideline); JP King 0-2; Jerry O’Connor, John O’Connor, P Noonan, R Clifford and C Naughton 0-1 each.	Referee: D Kirwan (Éire Óg)

=== Final ===
22 October 2006 Final	Erin's Own	2-19 – 3-14	Cloyne	Páirc Uí Chaoimh, Cork
	E Murphy 1-10 (0-8 frees, 0-1 ‘65); F Murphy 1-1; P Kelly, K Murphy (0-1 free) and B Corcoran 0-2 each; R Carroll and M O’Connor 0-1 each.	Report	C Cusack 2-0; P O’Sullivan 1-8 (0-6 frees); Diarmuid O’Sullivan 0-3 (0-1 free), J Cotter, M Naughton and C O’Sullivan 0-1 each.	Referee: D Copps (Ballyhea)

== Championship statistics ==
=== Top scorers ===
Overall

Rank	Player	Club	Tally	Total	Matches	Average
1	Paudie O'Sullivan	Cloyne	4-25	37	5	7.20
2	Maurice O'Sullivan	CIT	1-32	35	4	8.75
3	Eoghan Murphy	Erin's Own	1-31	34	5	6.80
3	Mickey O'Connell	Midleton	0-34	34	4	8.50
4	Diarmuid O'Sullivan	Cloyne	3-19	28	5	5.60
5	Ben O'Connor	Newtownshandrum	1-21	24	3	8.00
6	Conor Cusack	Cloyne	6-05	23	5	4.60
7	Joe Deane	Killeagh	1-19	22	3	7.33
8	Jerome O'Driscoll	Bride Rovers	0-22	22	4	5.50
9	Adrian Coughlan	Blackrock	0-21	21	3	7.00

In a single game

Rank	Player	Club	Tally	Total	Opposition
1	Diarmuid O'Sullivan	Cloyne	3-07	16	Midleton
2	Neil Ronan	Avondhu	2-08	14	CIT
3	Eoghan Murphy	Erin's Own	1-10	13	Cloyne
4	Maurice O'Sullivan	CIT	1-09	12	Avondhu
5	Stephen P. O'Sullivan	Na Piarsaigh	2-05	11	Delanys
5	John Anderson	Glen Rovers	1-08	11	Delanys
5	Paudie O'Sullivan	Cloyne	1-08	11	Erin's Own
5	Mickey O'Connell	Midleton	0-11	11	Cloyne
5	Timmy McCarthy	Castlelyons	0-11	11	Delanys
5	Adrian Coughlan	Blackrock	0-11	11	Castlelyons

=== Miscellaneous ===
- Erin's Own won the championship for the first time since 1992.
- The semi-final between Cloyne and Newtownshandrum was abandoned after just 11 minutes because of a waterlogged Páirc Uí Chaoimh pitch.
- Cloyne became the first team since Ballincollig in 1943 to lose three successive finals.
- Ballinhassig return to the senior championship for the first time since 1976
