= Patrick Horgan =

Irish hurler (born 1988)

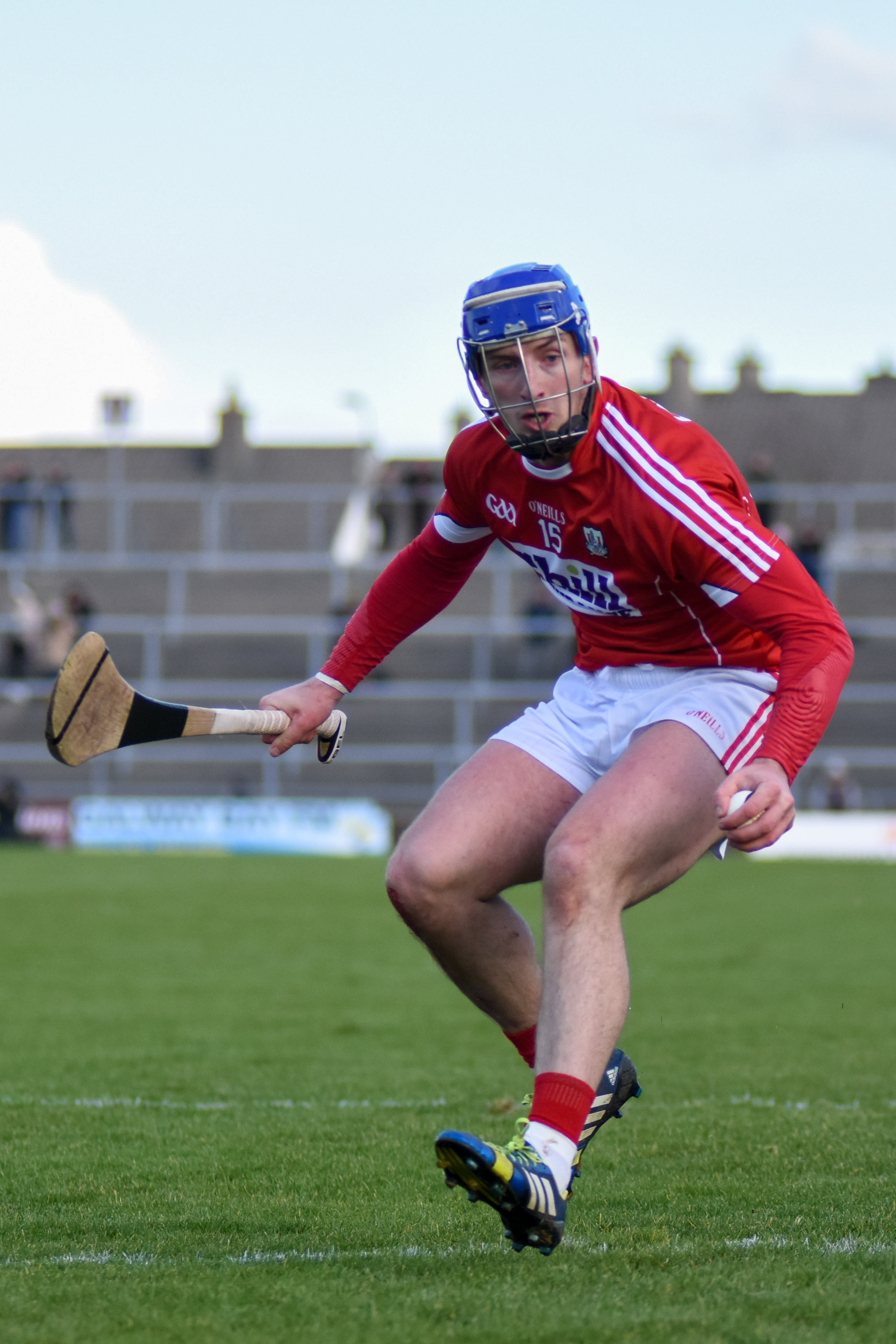
- Patrick Horgan in 2016

Personal information
- Native name: Pádraig Ó hOrgáin (Irish)
- Nickname: Hoggie
- Born: 5 May 1988 (age 38) Blackpool, Cork, Ireland
- Occupation: Sales executive
- Height: 5 ft 11 in (180 cm)

Sport
- Sport: Hurling
- Position: Corner-forward
Club*
Years	Club	Apps (scores)
2005–present	Glen Rovers	87 (34–725)
Club titles
- Cork titles: 3
Inter-county**
Years	County	Apps (scores)
2008–2025	Cork	90 (32–683)
Inter-county titles
- Munster titles: 4
- All-Irelands: 0
- NHL: 1
- All Stars: 4
- * club appearances and scores correct as of 13:07, 6 July 2024. **Inter County team apps and scores correct as of match played 20 July 2025.

Patrick 'Hoggie' Horgan. (born 5 May 1988) is an Irish hurler who plays for Cork Senior Championship club Glen Rovers and previously until 2025 at inter-county level with the Cork senior hurling team. He usually lines out as a forward.

As of his retirement from inter-county hurling in September 2025, he is both the All-time top scorer in the All-Ireland Senior Hurling Championship with 32 goals and 683 points (total 779 points), and the All-time top scorer in the National Hurling League with 26 goals and 674 points (total 752 points).

== Playing career ==
=== Glen Rovers ===
==== Minor and under-21 ====
Horgan joined the Glen Rovers club at a young age and played in all grades at juvenile and underage levels. On 20 November 2005, he was at right corner-forward when Glen Rovers faced Carrigaline in the Premier County Minor Championship final. Horgan top scored with 0-08, including five frees, in the Glen's 0–15 to 1–08 victory.

Horgan was appointed captain of the Glen Rovers minor team for the 2006 season. On 11 November, he was at right wing-forward for a second successive Premier County Minor Championship final. Bishopstown were the opponents, however, Horgan gave a man of the match display and scored 0–12 in the 0–18 to 2–09 victory. It was his last championship game in the minor grade.

Horgan subsequently progressed onto the Glen Rovers under-21 team. On 8 November 2008, he was at right wing-forward when Glen Rovers faced Duhallow in the Cork Premier Under-21 Championship final. Horgan scored six points, including five frees, in the 1–18 to 2–15 draw. The replay took place on 16 November, with Glen Rovers winning by 4–15 to 2–18. The game was described in the Irish Examiner as "one of the best hurling matches ever played at Páirc Uí Rinn." Horgan was named man of the match after scoring 3-08 of the Glen Rovers tally.

==== Senior ====
On 28 May 2005, having just turned seventeen earlier in the month, Horgan made his first appearance at senior level in a 0-13 apiece draw with St. Catherine's. On 12 June, he scored his first championship goal in an eight-point defeat by Bride Rovers. Horgan ended the championship as the Glen's top championship scorer with 1–14.

Horgan was the Cork Senior Championship top scorer in 2008. He lined out in all five of Glen Rovers' games that season and scored a total of 1-43.

On 10 October 2010, Horgan lined out at full-forward in Glen Rovers' first Cork Senior Championship final in 19 years, however, Sarsfields won the game by 1–17 to 0–18. Throughout the championship, Horgan had a scoring average of ten points per game. After scoring ten points in the final, he ended the 2010 championship as top scorer with 6-62 from eight games.

On 12 October 2014, Horgan was at right corner-forward when Glen Rovers faced Sarsfields in the Cork Senior Championship final. He was held scoreless from play but scored five frees, however, Sarsfields won by 2–18 to 0-08.

Horgan was at centre-forward for much of the Glen's 2015 championship campaign. He was also named in that position for the final against reigning champions Sarsfields. Horgan scored nine points, including seven frees, in the 2–17 to 1–13 victory for Glen Rovers. It was the club's first championship title since 1989.

For the third year in-a-row, Glen Rovers qualified for the championship final on 9 October 2016. Horgan scored 0-12 from centre-forward and secured the man of the match award in the 0–19 to 2–10 defeat of Erin's Own. He ended the 2016 championship as joint-top scorer with 3-63 from six games.

On 20 October 2019, Horgan played in his fifth final when Glen Rovers faced Imokilly. Lining out at centre-forward he top scored with 0–11, including eight frees, but ended the game on the losing side following a 2–17 to 1–16 defeat.

=== Cork ===
==== Minor & under-21 ====
Horgan first played for Cork as a member of the minor team. He was an unused substitute throughout the 2004 Munster Championship, but claimed a winners' medal from the bench after a 2–12 to 3-08 of Tipperary in the final. On 15 August, Horgan made his first championship appearance when he came on as a substitute for Eoghan Murphy in Cork's 2–15 to 1-13 All-Ireland semi-final defeat by Galway.

Horgan became a regular member of the starting fifteen during the 2005 Munster Championship. On 26 June, he scored 1-02 from right corner-forward in Cork's 2–18 to 1–12 defeat of Limerick in the Munster Championship final.

Horgan was appointed captain of the Cork minor team for the 2006 Munster Championship. On 25 June, he scored seven points from left corner-forward when Cork defeated Tipperary by 2–20 to 1–15 to win a third successive Munster Championship title.

On 6 June 2007, Horgan made his first appearance for the Cork under-21 team. in a 1–14 to 2–10 defeat of Tipperary. On 1 August, he scored two points in Cork's 1–20 to 0–10 defeat of Waterford to win the Munster Championship.

Horgan was in his final year with the Cork under-21 team when he was appointed captain for the 2009 Munster Championship. On 3 June, he scored 0–12 in his only championship game as captain in a 0–25 to 2–22 defeat by Tipperary.

==== Senior ====
Horgan made his first appearance for the Cork senior hurling team on 9 March 2008 in a 3–18 to 2-16 National Hurling League defeat of Dublin at Parnell Park where he scored two points. He was later included on Cork's panel for the 2008 Munster Championship and made his debut on 8 June as a 68th-minute substitute for Niall McCarthy in a 1–19 to 1–13 defeat by Tipperary. Horgan made a number of appearances from the bench in Cork's All-Ireland Qualifiers before earning his first championship start at right corner-forward in Cork's All-Ireland quarter-final defeat of Clare on 27 July.

On 2 May 2010, Horgan lined out at corner-forward in Cork's 2–22 to 1–17 defeat by Galway in the National League final. He scored three points, one of which was scored from a penalty which was deflected over the bar. On 11 July, Horgan lined out in his first Munster Championship final when he was named at left corner-forward in Cork's 2-15 apiece draw with Waterford. He was named in the same position for the replay a week later but was substituted at half-time after being held scoreless in the 1–16 to 1–13 defeat. Horgan ended the season by being nominated for his first All-Star.

Horgan was named vice-captain of the Cork senior team for the upcoming season on 29 October 2011. He later assumed the captaincy after an injury to captain Donal Óg Cusack ruled him out of the latter staged of the league and the championship. On 6 May 2012, Horgan lined out in his second National League final. He scored nine points, including six frees, in the 3–21 to 0–16 defeat by Kilkenny. He ended the league and championship as Cork's top scorer with 1-94, while Horgan was also nominated for a second All-Star.

Horgan lined out in his second Munster Championship final on 14 July 2013. Just before half-time he was red-carded for a stroke to the head of Limerick's Paudie O'Brien. Cork eventually lost the game by 0–24 to 0–15. Horgan's red card and one-match ban were later rescinded following a successful appeal to the Central Hearings Committee. On 8 September, Horgan lined out at full-forward against Clare in the All-Ireland final. He top scored for Cork with ten points, including eight frees, in the 3–16 to 0–25 draw. Horgan was again at full-forward for the replay on 28 September and scored nine points in the 5–16 to 3–16 defeat. He ended the season by being named at full-forward on the All-Star team.

On 3 July 2014, Horgan won a Munster Championship medal after scoring eight points in Cork's 2–24 to 0–24 defeat of Limerick in the last final to be played at the old Páirc Uí Chaoimh. He ended the season by being nominated for a fourth All-Star.

On 3 May 2015, Horgan was at left corner-forward in Cork's 1–24 to 0–17 defeat by Waterford in the National League final. His seven points from placed-balls ensured he ended the league as joint-top scorer with 2-87.

Horgan won his second Munster Championship medal on 9 July 2017 after scoring thirteen points in the 1–25 to 1–20 defeat of Clare in the final. During the game he surpassed Christy Ring to become Cork's all-time top championship scorer. Horgan ended the season by being named in the left corner-forward position on the All-Star team.

On 1 July 2018, Horgan won a third Munster Championship medal following a 2–24 to 3–19 defeat of Clare in the final. On 17 July 2018, he was voted as the PwC GAA/GPA Player of the Month for June as a result of "his usual unerring accuracy from placed balls and crucial scores from play". Horgan was later named in the left corner-forward position on the All-Star team.

On 19 May 2019, Horgan became only the fifth player ever to score a cumulative total of 400 points in the championship after registering 1–09 in a 1–26 to 1–19 defeat of Limerick. He also became the all-time top points scorer in the Munster Championship. Horgan ended the month by being named as the GAA/GPA Player of the Month for May. On 6 August 2019, he became only the second player ever after Henry Shefflin to be presented with a third GAA/GPA Player of the Month award. Horgan ended the year by receiving a fourth All-Star award while he was also shortlisted for the Hurler of the Year award.

On 16 November 2019, it was announced that Horgan would captain the Cork senior hurling team for the 2020 season.

On 23 September 2025, Horgan announced his retirement from inter-county hurling after 18 seasons. He retired holding the record for points scored in both the championship, 32-683, and league 26-674.

=== Munster ===
On 19 February 2012, Horgan was selected for the Munster inter-provincial team for the first time. He scored three points from left corner-forward in the 3–14 to 1–16 defeat by Leinster in the semi-final of the Interprovincial Championship.

On 3 March 2013, Horgan won a Railway Cup medal after scoring nine points in Munster's 1–22 to 0–15 defeat of Connacht in the final. He also ended the Railway Cup as top scorer with 0–15.

Horgan was selected for the Munster team for the third successive year in 2014. On 9 February, he was at full-forward for Munster's 1–18 to 0–16 defeat by Connacht in the semi-final.

=== Ireland ===
On 9 October 2012, Horgan was named on the Ireland squad for the Shinty/Hurling International Series. On 20 October, he scored 3–08 in Ireland's 3–10 to 2–09 defeat of Scotland in the first leg. Horgan played no part in the second leg, but claimed a winners' medal as a non-playing substitute as Ireland won the two-game series on aggregate.

On 8 October 2014, Horgan was selected for the Ireland squad once again. On 25 October, Ireland won the two-game series on an aggregate score of 4–26 to 3–22, with Horgan claiming a second winners' medal.

== Personal life ==
Horgan married Ashley Lovett at the Church of St Mary's in Ballincollig on 22 November 2019. He has a son Jack born in 2022.

In October 2026, he released his autobiography which was called 'Hoggie'.

== Career statistics ==
=== Club ===
As of 18 October 2026.

Team	Year	Cork PSHC		Munster		All-Ireland		Total	
Team	Year	Apps	Score	Apps	Score	Apps	Score	Apps	Score
Glen Rovers	2005	3	1-14	—		—		3	1-14
Glen Rovers	2006	2	0-02	—		—		2	0-02
Glen Rovers	2007	3	4-21	—		—		3	4-21
Glen Rovers	2008	5	1-43	—		—		5	1-43
Glen Rovers	2009	4	0-25	—		—		4	0-25
Glen Rovers	2010	8	6-62	—		—		8	6-62
Glen Rovers	2011	2	2-21	—		—		2	2-21
Glen Rovers	2012	4	0-33	—		—		4	0-33
Glen Rovers	2013	3	0-25	—		—		3	0-25
Glen Rovers	2014	6	0-35	—		—		6	0-35
Glen Rovers	2015	6	1-59	1	1-05	—		7	2-64
Glen Rovers	2016	6	3-63	2	0-13	—		8	3-76
Glen Rovers	2017	6	1-51	—		—		6	1-51
Glen Rovers	2018	2	1-22	—		—		2	1-22
Glen Rovers	2019	5	0-46	1	2-04	—		6	2-50
Glen Rovers	2020	5	2-55	—		—		5	2-55
Glen Rovers	2021	6	6-56	—		—		6	6-56
Glen Rovers	2022	3	1-33	—		—		3	1-33
Glen Rovers	2023	4	2-37	—		—		4	2-37
Glen Rovers	Total	83	31-703	4	3-22	—		87	34-725
Glen Rovers	Year	Cork SAHC		Munster		All-Ireland		Total	
Glen Rovers	Year	Apps	Score	Apps	Score	Apps	Score	Apps	Score
Glen Rovers	2024	2	4-15	—		—		2	4-15
Glen Rovers	Total	2	4-15	—		—		2	4-15
Glen Rovers	Year	Cork PSHC		Munster		All-Ireland		Total	
Glen Rovers	Year	Apps	Score	Apps	Score	Apps	Score	Apps	Score
Glen Rovers	2025	4	5-39	—		—		4	5-39
Glen Rovers	2026	6	1-57	—		—		6	1-57
Glen Rovers	Total	10	6-96	—		—		10	6-96
Career total		95	41-814	4	3-22	—		99	44-836

=== Inter-county ===
==== Minor ====
Team	Year	Munster		All-Ireland		Total	
Team	Year	Apps	Score	Apps	Score	Apps	Score
Cork	2004	0	0-00	1	0-00	1	0-00
Cork	2005	3	2-10	1	0-01	4	2-11
Cork	2006	3	0-16	1	0-07	4	0-23
Total		6	2-26	3	0-08	9	2-34

==== Under-21 ====
Team	Year	Munster		All-Ireland		Total	
Team	Year	Apps	Score	Apps	Score	Apps	Score
Cork	2007	3	0-03	1	1-03	4	1-06
Cork	2008	1	1-05	—		1	1-05
Cork	2009	1	0-12	—		1	0-12
Total		5	1-20	1	1-03	6	2-23

==== Senior ====
As of match played 20 July 2025

Team	Year	National League			Munster		All-Ireland		Total	
Team	Year	Division	Apps	Score	Apps	Score	Apps	Score	Apps	Score
Cork	2008	Division 1A	3	0-07	1	0-00	4	0-06	8	0-13
Cork	2009	Division 1	4	1-05	1	0-00	2	1-06	7	2-11
Cork	2010	Division 1	7	2-37	4	3-04	2	0-06	13	5-47
Cork	2011	Division 1	7	2-22	1	0-13	3	3-25	11	5-60
Cork	2012	Division 1A	7	0-52	1	0-11	4	1-31	12	1-94
Cork	2013	Division 1A	6	0-45	2	0-12	4	1-37	12	1-94
Cork	2014	Division 1B	6	3-51	4	2-41	1	0-02	11	5-94
Cork	2015	Division 1A	8	2-87	1	1-07	3	0-26	12	3-120
Cork	2016	Division 1A	6	3-43	1	0-04	2	0-19	9	3-66
Cork	2017	Division 1A	6	0-35	3	0-27	1	0-12	10	0-74
Cork	2018	Division 1A	4	2-36	5	1-42	1	0-11	10	3-89
Cork	2019	Division 1A	5	1-46	4	4-42	2	3-20	11	8-108
Cork	2020	Division 1A	5	3-49	1	1-08	2	1-16	8	5-73
Cork	2021	Division 1A	5	3-42	1	0-05	4	0-49	10	3-96
Cork	2022	Division 1A	5	1-41	4	0-28	2	0-06	11	1-75
Cork	2023	Division 1A	2	0-13	4	2-39	—		6	2-52
Cork	2024	Division 1A	4	1-31	4	4-37	4	1-37	12	6-105
Cork	2025	Division 1A	6	1-32	5	3-42	2	0-12	13	4-86
Career total			96	25-674	47	21-362	43	11-321	186	57-1357

=== Inter-provincial ===
As of match played 9 February 2014.

Team	Year	Railway Cup	
Team	Year	Apps	Score
Munster	2012	1	0-03
Munster	2013	2	0-15
Munster	2014	1	0-06
Total		4	0-24

=== International ===
As of match played 18 October 2014.

Team	Year	International Series	
Team	Year	Apps	Score
Ireland	2012	1	3-08
Ireland	2013	—	
Ireland	2014	1	0-02
Total		2	3-10

== Honours ==
=== Team ===
Glen Rovers

- Cork Premier Senior Hurling Championship (3): 2015, 2016, 2026
- Cork Senior A Hurling Championship (1): 2024
- Cork Under-21 Hurling Championship (1): 2008
- Cork Minor Hurling Championships (2): 2005, 2006 (c)

Cork

- Munster Senior Hurling Championship (4): 2014, 2017, 2018, 2025
- National Hurling League: 2025
- Munster Under-21 Hurling Championship (1): 2007
- Munster Minor Hurling Championship (3): 2004, 2005, 2006 (c)

Munster

- Railway Cup (1): 2013

=== Individual ===
Awards

- GAA GPA All Stars Awards (4): 2013, 2017, 2018, 2019
- GAA/GPA Player of the Month (3): June 2018, May 2019, July 2019
- Cork Senior Hurling Championship Final Man of the Match (1): 2016
- All-Ireland Senior Hurling Championship Top Scorer (2): 2021, 2024

== Records ==
As of match played 1 May 2022.

Glen Rovers

- Top championship scorer of all time: 31–655
- Overall championship top scorer: 2008, 2010, 2016, 2021
- Club's championship top scorer: 2005, 2007, 2008, 2009, 2010, 2011, 2012, 2013, 2014, 2015, 2016, 2017, 2018, 2019, 2020, 2021

Cork

- Top championship scorer of all time: 22–482
- Top league scorer of all-time: 22–557

All-Ireland Senior Hurling Championship

- Horgan scored 0-10 points against Clare in the second round of the 2022 Munster Championship to become the first player in history to reach 500 points (white flags).
- As of 19 June 2025, he is the all-time top scorer in the All-Ireland Senior Hurling Championship with a tally of 755 (33 goals and 656 points):

All-time top scorers in the All-Ireland Senior Hurling Championship
Rank	Player	Team	Goals	Points	Tally	Games	Era	Average
1	Patrick Horgan	Cork	33	656	775	86	2008–Present	9.0
2	T.J. Reid	Kilkenny	39	629	746	93	2008–Present	8.0
3	Joe Canning	Galway	27	486	567	62	2008–2021	9.3
4	Henry Shefflin	Kilkenny	27	484	565	71	1999–2014	8.0

Sporting positions
Preceded by Pa Cronin	Cork Minor Hurling Captain; 2006	Succeeded by Stephen McDonnell
Preceded by Pa Cronin	Cork Under-21 Hurling Captain; 2009	Succeeded by William Egan
Preceded by Shane O'Neill	Cork Senior Hurling Captain; 2012	Succeeded by Brian Murphy
Preceded by Séamus Harnedy	Cork Senior Hurling Captain; 2020-2021	Succeeded by Mark Coleman
