= 1944 Cork Junior Hurling Championship =

Irish hurling competition

- Teams: 7
- Champions: 31st Battalion (1st title)
- Runners-up: Cloyne

The 1944 Cork Junior Hurling Championship was the 47th staging of the Cork Junior Hurling Championship since its establishment by the Cork County Board in 1895.

The final was played on 18 February 1945 at the Clonmult Memorial Park in Midleton, between 31st Battalion and Cloyne, in what was their first ever meeting in the final. 31st Battalion won the match by 5-05 to 2-04 to claim their first ever championship title.

== Results ==
=== Final ===
18 February 1945 Final	31st Battalion	5-05 - 2-04	Cloyne	Clonmult Memorial Park
