= Jerry O'Sullivan (sports administrator) =

Irish hurler and Gaelic sports administrator

Chairman of the Munster Council
- In office 30 January 2016 – 25 January 2019
- Preceded by: Robert Frost
- Succeeded by: Liam Lenihan

Personal details
- Born: 1951 (age 74–75) Cloyne, County Cork, Ireland
- Spouse: Gearóidín O'Sullivan
- Children: Martina, Diarmuid, Colm, Domhnall, Eoin, Paudie

Jerry O'Sullivan (born 1951) is an Irish Gaelic games administrator. He has been the Chairman of the Munster Council since 2016.

Born in Cloyne, County Cork, O'Sullivan first played competitive hurling at juvenile and underage levels with Cloyne. He subsequently joined the club's senior team and won county championship medals in both the junior and intermediate grades.

O'Sullivan was still active as a club player when he became involved in the administrative affairs of the Gaelic Athletic Association. He was elected chairman of the Cloyne club in 1976, a position he held for sixteen years. O'Sullivan also served as public relations officer of the East Cork Board before being elected chairman for a five-year term in 1992.

As a member of the Cork County Board, O'Sullivan filled the roles of youth officer, coaching officer, vice-chairman and chairman from 2009 until 2011. He was simultaneously elected to the Munster Council before being elected chairman for a three-year term in 2016.

O'Sullivan's sons, Diarmuid and Paudie, have played hurling at all levels with Cork.

Sporting positions
Preceded by Mick Dolan	Chairman of the Cork County Board; 2009-2011	Succeeded by Bob Ryan
Preceded by Robert Frost	Chairman of the Munster Council; 2016-2019	Succeeded by Liam Lenihan
