= 1997 Cork Intermediate Hurling Championship =

Irish hurling competition

- Dates: 22 June 1997 – 2 November 1997
- Teams: 26
- Champions: Cloyne (3rd title); Maurice Cahill (captain); Jerry O'Sullivan (manager)
- Runners-up: Delanys

Tournament statistics
- Matches played: 29
- Goals scored: 85 (2.93 per match)
- Points scored: 620 (21.38 per match)
- Top scorer(s): Dan O'Brien (1-29)

The 1997 Cork Intermediate Hurling Championship was the 88th staging of the Cork Intermediate Hurling Championship since its establishment by the Cork County Board in 1909. The draw for the opening fixtures took place on 8 December 1996. The championship began on 22 June 1997 and ended on 2 November 1997.

On 2 November 1997, Cloyne won the championship after a 1-12 to 1-07 defeat of Delanys in the final at Páirc Uí Chaoimh. It was their third championship title overall and their first title since 1970.

Milford's Dan O'Brien was the championship's top scorer with 1-29.

== Team changes ==
=== From Championship ===
Promoted to the Cork Senior Hurling Championship

- Newtownshandrum

=== To Championship ===
Promoted from the Cork Junior A Hurling Championship

- Argideen Rangers

Regraded from the Cork Senior Hurling Championship

- Milford
- Youghal

== Results ==
=== First round ===
22 June 1997 First round	Aghada	2-13 - 4-13	St. Vincent's	Páirc Uí Chonaill, Cobh
	R Lewis 0-9, C Counihan 1-0, JP Crowley 1-0, K O'Keeffe 0-2, D Devoy 0-1, M Lewis 0-1.		J Buckley 2-1, W Leahy 0-6, J Canniff 1-2, T O'Sullivan 1-1, D O'Callaghan 0-3.	Referee: P O'Neill (Shamrocks)

27 June 1997 First round	Delanys	5-20 - 0-04	Bishopstown	Ballinlough Sportsfield, Ballinlough
	M McElhinney 3-1, D Power 2-2, B Egan 0-7, G Healy 0-4, D McElhinney 0-2, P Finnegan 0-2, B Buckley 0-1, G McAuliffe 0-1.		S Murphy 0-2, L Jones 0-1, K Harrington 0-1.	Referee: M O'Flaherty (Blackrock)

28 June 1997 First round	Milford	0-16 - 0-06	Na Piarsaigh	Carrowkeel Sportsfield, Mallow
	D O'Brien 0-9, R Geary 0-4, G Sheehan 0-2, P Buckley 0-1.		M Dineen 0-2, T Ó hAilpín 0-2, K O'Sullivan 0-1, K Butterworth 0-1.	Referee: L O'Flynn (Éire Óg)

29 June 1997 First round	Aghabullogue	0-11 - 1-12	Mallow	Ballyanley Sportsfield, Inniscarra
	J Healy 0-6, B Barry-Murphy 0-1, T Ó Murchú 0-1, J McSweeney 0-1, D Spillane 0-1, D Buckley 0-1.		R O'Connell 0-8, M Browne 1-1, F McCormack 0-2, R Sheehan 0-1.	Referee: J Motherway (Aghada)

29 June 1997 First round	Carrigtwohill	0-09 - 4-15	Tracton	Church Road, Blackrock
	S O'Farrell 0-6, E O'Mahony 0-1, P Kidney 0-1, S Collins 0-1.		DJ Kiely 2-2, Patrick Murphy 0-7, Peter Murphy 2-0, M Kingston 0-3, M Quinn 0-2, F Lynch 0-1.	Referee: W Horgan (Brian Dillons)

29 June 1997 First round	Ballymartle	1-20 - 0-09	Cobh	Church Road, Blackrock
	P Deasy 1-7, C Deasy 0-3, G Cummins 0-3, K Lordan 0-2, M Fitzpatrick 0-2, M Fitzgerald 0-1, A McCarthy 0-1, J O'Mahony 0-1.		P Looney 0-2, M Daly 0-2, E O'Connell 0-1, M Walker 0-1, B Meaney 0-1, R Meaney 0-1, J O'Mahony 0-1.	Referee: D O'Leary (Cloughduv)

29 June 1997 First round	St. Finbarr's	1-04 - 1-11	Valley Rovers	Páirc Liam Mhic Cárthaigh, Ballygarvan
	M Barry 1-0, F O'Brien 0-2, K McTiernan 0-1, A Maher 0-1.		Jeremy Hurley 0-4, M Cronin 1-0, J O'Donovan 0-2, D Kiely 0-2, E Newman 0-1, R O'DOnovan 0-1, James Hurley 0-1.	Referee: D Kirwan (Éire Óg)

29 June 1997 First round	Youghal	1-11 - 1-07	Inniscarra	Riverstown Sporstfield, Sallybrook
	E Coleman 0-5, T Coyne 1-1, B Hogan 0-2, M Walsh 0-1, W Joyce 0-1, JP Joyce 0-1.		S Holland 0-4, T Ahern 1-0, D Holland 0-2, K O'Neill 0-1.	Referee: J O'Leary

29 June 1997 First round	Argideen Rangers	1-12 - 1-12	Éire Óg	Páirc Liam Mhic Cárthaigh, Ballygarvan
	T Crowley 0-6, J Crowley 1-1, M Foley 0-2, M Walsh 0-2, E Guinevan 0-1.		T Cronin 1-6, P Bradley 0-2, P Coakley 0-2, J Murphy 0-2.	Referee: K Healy (Ballymartle)

29 June 1997 First round	Killeagh	3-09 - 2-08	Douglas	Riverstown Sportsfield, Sallybrook
	A Budds 1-1, J Deane 0-4, L Collins 1-0, M Landers 1-0, T Fitzgibbon 0-3, G Scully 0-1.		T Twomey 2-0, J Farrell 0-3, G Lynch 0-1, D McSweeney 0-1, J Barry 0-1, E Sharkey 0-1, G Wade 0-1.	Referee: D Relihan

13 July 1997 First round replay	Argideen Rangers	4-19 - 0-06	Éire Óg	Páirc Liam Mhic Cárthaigh, Ballygarvan
	M Walsh 2-4, T Crowley 1-7, F Walsh 1-0, M Foley 0-4, J Crowley 0-2, B Harte 0-1, B Hennessy 0-1.		T Cronin 0-4, P O'Flynn 0-1, P Bradley 0-1.	Referee: W Horgan (Brian Dillons)

=== Second round ===
28 June 1997 Second round	Cloyne	1-12 - 1-07	Cloughduv	Páirc Uí Rinn, Cork
	I Quinlan 1-3, E Canavan 0-4, P Cahill 0-3, J Cotter 0-1, D O'Sullivan 0-1.		K Murray 1-1, T Barry-Murphy 0-4, J O'Riordan 0-1, F Walsh 0-1.	Referee: P Nolan (Na Piarsaigh)

28 June 1997 Second round	Blarney	1-08 - 0-07	Glen Rovers	Páirc Uí Rinn, Cork
	S O'Donoghue 1-7, A Shanahan 0-1.		G Foley 0-2, P Power 0-1, L White 0-1, G Hackett 0-1, L Galvin 0-1, G O'Neill 0-1.	Referee: P Hogan (Carrigtwohill)

29 June 1997 Second round	Newcestown	0-14 - 1-07	Ballincollig	Knockanemore Sportsfield, Ovens
	P Condon 0-4, D Long 0-3, J O'Sullivan 0-2, D McCarthy 0-2, D Collins 0-2, D Wilson 0-1.		F Kelly 1-4, T O'Leary 0-1, D Murphy 0-1.	Referee: P O'Connor (aghada)

13 July 1997 Second round	Valley Rovers	0-10 - 1-13	Killeagh	Páirc Uí Rinn, Cork
	R O'Donovan 0-3, D Kiely 0-3, E Newman 0-2, A Crowley 0-1, C O'Donovan 0-1.		J Deane 0-7, L Collins 1-1, G Scully 0-2, J Irwin 0-1, B Walsh 0-1, A Budds 0-1.	Referee: D Kirwan (Éire Óg)

13 July 1997 Second round	Ballymartle	6-15 - 4-07	St. Vincent's	Páirc Uí Rinn, Cork
	P Deasy 2-2, A McCarthy 2-1, P Coughlan 1-4, C Deasy 1-1, M Fitzpatrick 0-4, J Cummins 0-1, K Lordan 0-1, B Dwyer 0-1.		J Canniffe 2-0, D O'Callaghan 1-3, S Rea 1-0, W Leahy 0-2, J Leahy 0-2.	Referee: D O'Leary (Cloughduv)

19 July 1997 Second round	Milford	4-10 - 4-10	Tracton	Páirc Mhic Gearailt, Fermoy
	G Sheehan 3-0, M Fitzgibbon 1-0, V Sheehan 0-3, D O'Brien 0-3, R Geary 0-2, G Fitzgibbon 0-1, N Geary 0-1.		K Kingston 3-4, P Murphy 0-4, M Quinn 1-0, F Lynch 0-2.	Referee: P Spillane (Carrigtwohill)

20 July 1997 Second round	Youghal	1-09 - 1-08	Argideen Rangers	Páirc Uí Chaoimh, Cork
	T Coyne 1-0, M Walsh 0-3, E Coleman 0-2, T O'Connell 0-1, JP Joyce 0-1, G Geary 0-1, R Byrne 0-1.		M Foley 1-0, E Harrington 0-3, B Harte 0-3, T Crowley 0-2.	Referee: W Horgan (Brian Dillons)

27 July 1997 Second round	Delanys	4-09 - 0-11	Mallow	Blarney Sportsfield, Blarney
	M McElhinney 3-1, B Egan 0-5, D McElhinney 1-0, G Healy 0-1, D Power 0-1, P Finnegan 0-1.		R O'Connell 0-9, J Walsh 0-1, M Browne 0-1.	Referee: J Motherway (Aghada)

2 August 1997 Second round replay	Milford	1-11 - 1-08	Tracton	Páirc Mhic Gearailt, Fermoy
	D O'Brien 1-7, R Geaney 0-2, G Fitzgibbon 0-1, M Fitzgibbon 0-1.		M Quinn 1-1, K Kingston 0-4, P Murphy 0-2, P O'Reilly 0-1.

=== Quarter-final ===
10 August 1997 Quarter-final	Killeagh	0-17 - 3-08	Youghal	Páirc Liam Uí Riain, Rostellan
	J Deane 0-6, B Walsh 0-6, A Budds 0-2, M Landers 0-1, L Collins 0-1, K Scully 0-1.		T Coyne 2-0, M Walsh 1-1, T O'Connell 0-2, V Murray 0-1, JP Joyce 0-1, A Murphy 0-1, E Coleman 0-1, M Downing 0-1.	Referee: J Motherway (Aghada)

10 August 1997 Quarter-final	Cloyne	0-12 - 0-04	Blarney	Páirc Uí Rinn, Cork
	E Canavan 0-8, P O'Shea 0-1, A O'Brien 0-1, D O'Sullivan 0-1, P Cahill 0-1.		S O'Donoghue 0-2, A Shanahan 0-1, D Buckley 0-1.	Referee: K Healy (Ballymartle)

17 August 1997 Quarter-final	Delanys	2-08 - 1-10	Ballymartle	Tracton Sportsfield, Minane Bridge
	D McElhinney 1-1, P Finnegan 1-1, M O'Driscoll 0-2, B Egan 0-2, M McElhinney 0-2.		P Deasy 0-4, P Coughlan 1-0, M Fitzpatrick 0-3, C Deasy 0-1, C Sheehan 0-1, K Lordan 0-1.	Referee: D Kirwan (Éire Óg)

23 August 1997 Quarter-final	Milford	3-09 - 2-10	Newcestown	Banteer Sportsfield, Banteer
	D O'Brien 0-7, N Geary 2-0, V Sheehan 1-0, R Geary 0-1, P O'Brien 0-1.		P Condon 2-0, E Kenneally 0-3, J O'Sullivan 0-3, D Wilson 0-1, D Collins 0-1, D McCarthy 0-1, P Dineen 0-1.	Referee: J O'Mahony (Kanturk)

11 September 1997 Quarter-final replay	Killeagh	2-12 - 1-15	Youghal	Páirc Liam Uí Riain, Rostellan
	B Walsh 0-7, A Budds 1-0, M Landers 1-0, J Deane 0-3, L Collins 0-1, D Walsh 0-1.		E Coleman 0-9, B Hogan 1-0, M Downing 0-2, M Walsh 0-2, B Coleman 0-1.	Referee: FP Spillane (Carrigtwohill)

19 October 1997 Quarter-final second replay	Killeagh	2-11 - 2-13	Youghal	Páirc Liam Uí Riain, Rostellan
	B Walsh 0-7, A Budds 1-0, N O'Connor 1-0, J Deane 0-2, M Landers 0-2.		F O'Sullivan 2-0, E Coleman 0-5, BN Hogan 0-3, M Walsh 0-3, B Hogan 0-1, A Murphy 0-1.	Referee: FP Spillane (Carrigtwohill)

=== Semi-finals ===
25 October 1997 Semi-final	Cloyne	1-10 - 0-09	Milford	Castletownroche
	P O'Shea 1-1, E Canavan 0-4, P Cahill 0-2, M Cahill 0-1, B Motherway 0-1, J Cotter 0-1.		D O'Brien 0-3, V Sheehan 0-2, M Fitzgibbon 0-2, P Buckley 0-1, G Sheehan 0-1.

26 October 1997 Semi-final	Delanys	0-12 - 1-08	Youghal	Páirc Séamus de Barra, Carrigtwohill
	B Egan 0-6, D Quinlan 0-3, M McElhinney 0-2, D McElhinney 0-1.		M Walsh 1-0, E Coleman 0-3, B Coleman 0-2, B Hogan 0-2, M Downing 0-1.	Referee: D Kirwan

=== Final ===
2 November 1997 Final	Cloyne	1-12 - 1-07	Delanys	Páirc Uí Chaoimh, Cork
	I Quinlan 1-2, E Canavan 0-5, V Cusack 0-2, P O'Shea 0-1, E O'Sullivan 0-1, A O'Brien 0-1.		G Healy 1-0, D Quinlan 0-2, M O'Driscoll 0-2, B Egan 0-1, M McElhinney 0-1, D McElhinney 0-1.	Referee: FL O'Flynn (Éire Óg)

== Championship statistics ==
=== Top scorers ===
Top scorers overall

Rank	Player	Club	Tally	Total	Matches	Average
1	Dan O'Brien	Milford	1-29	32	5	6.40
2	Mark McElhinney	Delanys	6-07	25	5	5.00
2	Eoin Coleman	Youghal	0-25	25	6	4.16
4	Paudie Deasy	Ballymartle	3-13	22	3	7.33
4	Brendan Walsh	Killeagh	0-22	22	4	5.50
4	Joe Deane	Killeagh	0-22	22	5	5.40
7	Éamonn Canavan	Cloyne	0-21	21	4	5.25
7	Barry Egan	Delanys	0-21	21	5	4.25
9	Tony Crowley	Argideen Rangers	1-15	18	3	6.00
10	Kieran Kingston	Tracton	3-08	17	3	5.66
10	Ray O'Connell	Mallow	0-17	17	2	8.50

Top scorers in a single game

Rank	Player	Club	Tally	Total	Opposition
1	Kieran Kingston	Tracton	3-04	13	Milford
2	Mark McElhinney	Delanys	3-01	10	Bishopstown
2	Mark McElhinney	Delanys	3-01	10	Mallow
2	Mickey Walsh	Argideen Rangers	2-04	10	Éire Óg
2	Dan O'Brien	Milford	1-07	10	Tracton
2	Paudie Deasy	Ballymartle	1-07	10	Cobh
2	Tony Crowley	Argideen Rangers	1-07	10	Éire Óg
2	Seán O'Donoghue	Blarney	1-07	10	Glen Rovers
9	Tim Cronin	Éire Óg	1-06	9	Argideen Rangers
9	Richie Lewis	Aghada	0-09	9	St. Vincent's
9	Dan O'Brien	Milford	0-09	9	Na Piarsaigh
9	Ray O'Connell	Mallow	0-09	9	Delanys
9	Eoin Coleman	Youghal	0-09	9	Killeagh
