= 1939 Cork Junior Hurling Championship =

Irish hurling competition

- Champions: Cloyne (1st title)
- Runners-up: Mayfield

The 1939 Cork Junior Hurling Championship was the 42nd staging of the Cork Junior Hurling Championship since its establishment by the Cork County Board.

On 13 November 1939, Cloyne won the championship following a 6–05 to 3–03 defeat of Mayfield in the final at Midleton Sportsfield. It was their first ever championship title.
