= 2013 Inter-Provincial Hurling Championship =

- Dates: 17 February – 3 March 2013
- Teams: Connacht; Leinster; Munster; Ulster

The 2013 Inter-Provincial Hurling Championship, known as the 2013 M Donnelly Hurling Inter-Provincial Championship due to the tournament's sponsorship by businessman Martin Donnelly, was the 84th series of the Inter-provincial Championship. The annual hurling championship between the four historic provinces of Ireland is contested by Connacht, Leinster, Munster and Ulster.

Leinster were the reigning champions but Munster won the title after defeating Connacht in the final by 1-22 to 0-15.

== Participants ==
The teams involved are:

Province	Manager	Captain
Connacht	Anthony Cunningham	
Leinster	Joe Dooley	Brian Hogan
Munster	Liam Sheedy	
Ulster	Gregory O'Kane	

== Results ==
=== Inter-provincial Championship ===
February 17
Semi-final
12:30 IST/GMT+0 (UTC+0)

Ulster	1-14 - 3-20	Munster
N McManus (1-7, 0-4f), P Shiels (0-3), S McCrory (0-1), K Hinphey (0-1), A Grant (0-1), R Gaffney (0-1).	Report	G Mulcahy (2-2), S Dowling (0-7, 0-6f, 0-1 '45'), P Horgan (0-6, 0-6f), P O'Sullivan (1-2), P Cronin (0-1), S McGrath (0-1), B O'Meara (0-1).

Athletic Grounds, Armagh
Referee: P Murphy (Carlow)

February 17
Semi-final
14:00 IST/GMT+0 (UTC+0)

Leinster	1-16 - 3-13	Connacht
S Dooley 0-8 (7fs), E Larkin 1-0, R Hogan 0-3, A Fogarty, J Bergin 0-2 each, C Fennelly 0-1.	Report	N Burke 0-9 (4fs, 0-1 65), D Glennon 1-1, C Donnellan 0-3, C Callanan (f), D Hayes 1-0 each.

O'Connor Park, Tullamore
Referee: O Elliott (Antrim)

March 3
Final
14:00 IST/GMT+0 (UTC+0)

Munster	1-22 - 0-15	Connacht
P Horgan (0-09, 0-07f), P O'Sullivan (1-02), G Mulcahy (0-03), P Cronin (0-03), S Dowling (0-03), A Nash (0-01, 0-01f), S O’Sullivan (0-01).	Report	J Canning (0-06, 0-05f), N Healy (0-03), D Collins (0-01), I Tannian (0-01), C Donnellan (0-01), T Haran (0-01), J Cooney (0-01), D Glennon (0-01).

Cusack Park, Ennis
Referee: A Stapleton (Laois)

== Top scorers ==
=== Championship ===
Rank	Player	County	Tally	Total	Matches	Average
1	Patrick Horgan	Munster	0-15	15	2	7.5

=== Single game ===
Rank	Player	County	Tally	Total	Opposition
1	Neil McManus	Ulster	1-7	10	Munster
2	Niall Burke	Connacht	0-9	9	Leinster
2	Patrick Horgan	Munster	0-9	9	Connacht
3	Graeme Mulcahy	Munster	2-2	8	Ulster
3	Shane Dooley	Leinster	0-8	8	Connacht
5	Shane Dowling	Munster	0-7	7	Ulster
