= 2008 Cork Senior Hurling Championship =

Annual hurling competition season

- Dates: 3 May 2008 – 28 September 2008
- Teams: 25
- Sponsor: Evening Echo
- Champions: Sarsfields (3rd title); Kieran Murphy (captain); Bertie Óg Murphy (manager)
- Runners-up: Bride Rovers; Brian Murphy (captain); Barry Hazlewood (manager)
- Relegated: St. Catherine's

Tournament statistics
- Matches played: 41
- Top scorer(s): Patrick Horgan (1-43)

The 2008 Cork Senior Hurling Championship was the 120th staging of the Cork Senior Hurling Championship since its establishment by the Cork County Board in 1887. The draw for the 2017 fixtures took place at the County Convention in December 2007. The championship began on 3 May 2008 and ended on 28 September 2008.

Erin's Own were the defending champions, however, they were defeated by Bride Rovers in the semi-final.

On 16 August 2008, St. Catherine's were relegated from the championship following a 1–10 to 1–12 defeat by Carrigtwohill.

On 28 September 2008, Sarsfields won the championship following a 2–14 to 2–13 defeat of Bride Rovers in the final. This was their third championship title overall and their first in 51 championship seasons.

Glen Rovers's Patrick Horgan was the championship's top scorer with 1-43.

== Team changes ==
=== To Championship ===
Promoted from the Cork Premier Intermediate Hurling Championship

- Carrigtwohill

=== From Championship ===
Relegated from the Cork Senior Hurling Championship

- Douglas

== Results ==
=== Divisional/colleges section ===
11 May 2008 Round 1	Cork Institute of Technology	0-16 – 2-10	Seandún	Páirc Uí Chaoimh, Cork
	D Crowley 0-7 (0-3 frees); S Corcoran, L Desmond (0-1 65) 0-2 each; S White, D Lynch, B Aherne, T Murphy, D Mannix 0-1 each.	Report	JP Murphy 1-5; J Horgan 0-3 (frees); S Kelly 1-0; I Looney, K Brosnan 0-1 each.	Referee: C McAlister (Aghada)

11 May 2008 Round 1	Imokilly	0-26 – 2-12	Duhallow	Doneraile
	P O’Regan 0-9 (0-7f, 0-1 ‘65), E Enright 0-6, B Lawton 0-3, R Spillane, J Flavin 0-2 each, T O’Keeffe, P O’Brien, P Sloane, G O’Leary 0-1 each.	Report	L McLoughlin 0-7 (0-6f), D Duane 1-1, D O’Sullivan 1-0, M Sheehy, D Murphy, J McLoughlin, N O’Callaghan 0-1 each.

11 May 2008 Round 1	University College Cork	3-22 – 1-09	Carbery	Cloughduv
	S Moylan 0-8, K Hartnett 1-3, J Halbert 1-2, J Logue 1-1, G Mulcahy 0-4, T Mullane 0-2, G Barry 0-2.		D Harrington 1-3 J Fleming 0-2, K Griffin 0-2, R Flynn 0-1, K O'Donovan 0-1.	Referee: J Kearney (Na Piarsaigh)

18 May 2008 Round 1 replay	Cork Institute of Technology	1-24 – 4-04	Seandún	Páirc Uí Rinn, Cork
	L Desmond 0-7 (3f); D Crowley 1-3; B Corry, A Mannix (3 from f) 0-4 each; S Corcoran 0-3; T Murphy 0-2; G O’Mahony 0-1.	Report	D Niblock 2-0; A Cadogan 1-1 (21, 65); K Brosnan 1-0; JP Murphy, J Masters, G McLoughlin 0-1 each.

24 May 2008 Round 2	Cork Institute of Technology	0-25 – 1-11	Carrigdhoun	Páirc Liam Mhic Cárthaigh, Ballygarvan
	A Mannix 0-12, S White 0-4, S Corcoran 0-3, Tony Murphy 0-2, L Desmond 0-2, B Corry 0-1, Timmy Murphy 0-1.	Report	S O'Brien 0-4, R O'Dwyer 0-4, M Kennefick 1-0, J Kingston 0-1, S O'Sullivan 0-1, D O'Sullivan 0-1.	Referee: C Lane (Banteer)

10 June 2008 Round 1	Avondhu	1-25 – 2-18 (aet)	Muskerry	Mourne Abbey
	N Ronan 0-13, D Moher 1-1, J O'Callaghan 0-4, D Relihan 0-3, D Ronan 0-3, M O'Sullivan 0-1.		R O'Doherty 1-4, D O'Riordan 0-5, J Hurley 1-0, M McCarthy 0-1, D Corkery 0-1, W Ryan 0-1, T O'Mahony 0-1, R Byrne 0-1, B Aherne 0-1, T O'Leary 0-1, J Hughes 0-1, T Kenny 0-1.	Referee: C Lane (Banteer)

=== Round 1 ===
3 May 2008 Round 1	Killeagh	1-11 – 1-11	Castlelyons	Youghal
	S Long 1-2, J Deane 0-5, D Kelleher 0-1, S Crowley 0-1, A Walsh 0-1, J Budds 0-1.		T McCarthy 0-8, E Fitzgerald 1-2, L Sexton 0-1.	Referee: A Cummins (Ballymartle)

3 May 2008 Round 1	Sarsfield's	2-09 – 2-08	Ballinhassig	Páirc Uí Chaoimh, Cork
	P Ryan 0-5 frees; G McCarthy and K Murphy 1-0 each; J Murphy 0-2; C McCarthy and T Óg Murphy 0-1 each.	Report	F O’Leary 2-3; M Coleman 0-3 frees; D O’Sullivan and P Coomey 0-1 each.	Referee: C Lyons (Nemo Rangers)

4 May 2008 Round 1	Newtownshandrum	0-17 – 1-10	Bishopstown	Mallow GAA Complex, Mallow
	B O’Connor 0-8 (0-4 frees); J O’Connor 0-4; J O’Connor 0-2; R Clifford, JP King, PJ Copps 0-1 each.	Report	P Cronin 0-5 (0-4 frees); M Power 1-0; S O’Neill (free), J Murphy, K Coughlin, I Jones, K O’Driscoll, 0-1 each.

9 May 2008 Round 1 replay	Killeagh	1-15 – 0-12	Castlelyons	Youghal
	J Deane 0-8, A Walsh 1-0, J Budds 0-2, J Fitzgerald 0-1, P McCarthy 0-1, B Collins 0-1, B Barry 0-1, S Long 0-1.		T McCarthy 0-7, E Fitzgerald 0-3, S Crowley 0-1, A O'Sullivan 0-1.	Referee: C Lyons (Nemo Rangers)

10 May 2008 Round 1	Na Piarsaigh	1-21 – 1-12	Carrigtwohill	Páirc Uí Chaoimh, Cork
	C Lynch 1-4 (0-4 frees); P Gould 0-5; SJ O’Sullivan, R McGregor, S Glasgow, J Gardiner (0-1 65), D Mannix 0-2 each; M Prendergast, R Healy 0-1 each.	Report	N McCarthy 0-4 (0-3 frees); R White 0-3; F Flannery 0-2; M McCarthy, B Lordan, J Barrett 0-1 each.	Referee: D Kirwan (Éire Óg)

10 May 2008 Round 1	Glen Rovers	1-13 – 1-13	Cloyne	Páirc Uí Chaoimh, Cork
	P Horgan 0-11 (0-8 frees); K O’Callaghan 1-0; D Cronin, D Busteed 0-1 each.	Report	P O’Sullivan 0-4 (0-3 frees); J Nyhan 1-0; M Naughton, D Cusack (0-2 65s, 0-1 free) 0-3 each; D Ring 0-2 (0-1 free); Diarmuid O’Sullivan 0-1.

11 May 2008 Round 1	Midleton	0-15 – 1-10	St. Catherine’s	Páirc Liosgcúl, Lisgoold
	M O’Connell 0-10 (0-8 frees), P Haughney 0-2, S Hennessy, L Walsh and A Ryan 0-1 each.	Report	S Cotter 0-6 (0-4 frees), P O’Connell 1-0, M Fitzgerald 0-2 (frees), D Farrell and S Kearney 0-1 each.

11 May 2008 Round 1	Erin's Own	1-16 – 0-07	Blackrock	Páirc Uí Chaoimh, Cork
	E Murphy 1-7 (0-5 frees, 0-1 65); M O’Carroll, A Bowen, C Coakley 0-2 each; P Kelly, S Kelly, D O’Flynn 0-1 each.	Report	D Cashman (frees), D Gosnell 0-2 each; P Tierney, J Young, D Coughlan 0-1 each.

17 May 2008 Round 1 replay	Glen Rovers	1-17 – 2-10	Cloyne	Páirc Uí Chaoimh, Cork
	P Horgan 0-13 (0-10 frees); K O’Callaghan 1-0; D Busteed, S Kennefick, S McDonald, G Callinan 0-1 each.	Report	P O’Sullivan 1-7 (0-5 frees); C Cusack 1-0; D. Ring, Diarmuid O’Sullivan, Donal O’Sullivan 0-1 each.	Referee: J Sexton (Ballyhea)

18 May 2008 Round 1	St. Finbarr’s	0-11 – 0-09	Bride Rovers	Páirc Uí Chaoimh, Cork
	K Murray (frees), C McCarthy (0-1 free), M Ryan 0-2 each; J Neville, R O’Mahony, R Curran (free), S Nott, J Crowley 0-1 each.	Report	J O’Driscoll 0-6 (0-5 frees, 0-1 65); C O’Keeffe 0-2; R Cahill 0-1.	Referee: J Sexton (Ballyhea)

=== Round 2 ===
23 May 2008 Round 2	Cloyne	0-17 – 0-14	Carrigtwohill	Clonmult Memorial Park, Midleton
	D Ring 0-3, P O'Sullivan 0-3, J Cotter 0-2, M Cahill 0-2, M Naughton 0-2, J Nyhan 0-2, Diarmuid O'Sullivan 0-1, C Cusack 0-1, D Óg Cusack 0-1.		R Whyte 0-3, Seánie O'Farrell 0-3, N McCarthy 0-3, S Dineen 0-3, M Fitzgerald 0-1, T Hogan 0-1.	Referee: J Sexton (Ballyhea)

24 May 2008 Round 2	Castleyons	3-10 – 0-15	St. Catherine’s	Páirc Mac Gearailt, Fermoy
	T McCarthy 2-6, D Wallace 1-1, E Fitzgerald 0-2, C McGann 0-1.	Report	S Cotter 0-6, Johnny Sheehan 0-2, S Kearney 0-2, R O'Connell 0-2, Junior Sheehan 0-1, C Ahern 0-1, K Morrison 0-1.	Referee: D Copps (Ballyhea)

24 May 2008 Round 2	Blackrock	3-09 – 1-10	Bishopstown	Páirc Uí Chaoimh, Cork
	F Ryan 2-0, B O'Keeffe 1-1, A Coughlan 0-4, D Cashman 0-2, J Young 0-1, M Drummond 0-1.	Report	T Murray 1-0, P Cronin 0-3, M Power 0-3, D Crowley 0-1, R Conway 0-1, J Murphy 0-1, S O'Neill 0-1.	Referee: A Cummins (Ballymartle)

25 May 2008 Round 2	Bride Rovers	3-07 – 1-13	Ballinhassig	Riverstown Park, Glanmire
	J O'Driscoll 2-3, Brian Murphy 1-0, B Johnson 0-3, D Ryan 0-1.	Report	M Coleman 0-5, F O'Leary 1-1, D O'Callaghan 0-4, S Dineen 0-2, P Coomey 0-1.	Referee: D Kirwan (Éire Óg)

14 June 2008 Round 2 replay	Bride Rovers	0-10 – 0-09	Ballinhassig	Riverstown Park, Glanmire
	J O'Driscoll 0-5, B Johnson 0-2, M Collins 0-2, C O'Keeffe 0-1.		M Coleman 0-3, D Dineen 0-2, D O'Sullivan 0-2, D O'Callaghan 0-1, S Dineen 0-1.	Referee: D Copps (Ballyhea)

=== Round 3 ===
14 June 2008 Round 3	St. Finbarr’s	0-14 – 0-14	Blackrock	Páirc Uí Chaoimh, Cork
	A Browne (1f) and D Cashman 0-3 each, B O’Keeffe, C O’Leary, A Coughlan (1f, 1 65) 0-2 each, W Sherlock and D Gosnell 0-1 each.	Report	R O’Mahony and G McCarthy 0-3 each, K Murray (2f) and J Crowley 0-2 each, C McCarthy, A Fitzpatrick, G O’Connor and M Ryan 0-1 each.

14 June 2008 Round 3	Glen Rovers	1-13 – 0-11	Na Piarsaigh	Páirc Uí Chaoimh, Cork
	P Horgan 0-6 (0-4 frees), E Cronin 1-0, K O’Callaghan and D Goggin 0-2 each, D Busteed, J Anderson, D Dorris 0-1 each.	Report	C Lynch 0-5 (0-4 frees), SJ O’Sullivan 0-2, P Gould, S Óg Ó hAilpín, C O’Sullivan, R Groegor 0-1 each.	Referee: D Kirwan (Éire Óg)

17 June 2008 Round 3	Avondhu	2-12 – 0-17 (aet)	Cork Institute of Technology	Rathcormac
	N Ronan 0-6 (0-3 frees, 0-1 65); D Moher 0-3; M O’Sullivan, A O’Brien 1-0 each; Donal Relihan, Dave Relihan, B Murphy 0-1 each.	Report	L Desmond 0-7 (0-3 frees, 0-2 65s); B Corry, J Moylan 0-3 each; D Coughlan, S Corcoran, G O’Riordan, L Mannix 0-1 each.	Referee: C McAlister (Aghada)

20 June 2008 Round 3	Sarsfield's	1-16 – 2-09	Cloyne	Clonmult Memorial Park, Midleton
	P Ryan 0-6 (0-4f), P Barry 1-1, J Murphy 0-3, T Og Murphy 0-2, K Murphy, C McCarthy, D Kearney, D Roche 0-1 each.	Report	C O'Sullivan, C Cusack 1-0 each, P O'Sullivan 0-4 (0-1f), D 6g Cusack 0-2 (0-1f, 0-1 65), C Reiily, D O'Sullivan, M Naughton 0-1 each.

20 June 2008 Round 3	Erin's Own	2-15 – 1-16	Killeagh	Clonmult Memorial Park, Midleton
	E Murphy 0-7 (0-4 frees); A Bowen, P McGrath (og) 1-0 each; M O’Connor 0-3; S Kelly 0-2; M Murphy. S Bowen (free), B Clifford 0-1 each.	Report	J Deane 0-10 (0-4 free); J Budds 1-1; A Walsh, B Collins, L Collins, D Kelleher, B Barry 0-1 each.	Referee: C Lyons (Nemo Rangers)

21 June 2008 Round 3	Newtownshandrum	1-16 – 2-12	Castlelyons	Mallow GAA Complex, Mallow
	B O'Connor 0-9, J Bowles 1-0, JP King 0-2, R Clifford 0-1, J O'Connor 0-1, C Naughton 0-1, J Herlihy 0-1, R Fallon 0-1.	Report	T McCarthy 1-8, C McGann 1-1, E Fitzgerald 0-1, D Sexton 0-1, D Wallace 0-1.	Referee: A Cummins (Ballymartle)

22 June 2008 Round 3	Bride Rovers	1-11 – 1-10	Midleton
	D Ryan 1-1, J O'Driscoll 0-3, S Ryan 0-2, M Kearney 0-2, B Johnson 0-1, M Collins 0-1, P Murphy 0-1.		L Walsh 0-5, W O'Brien 1-0, M O'Connell 0-3, A Ryan 0-1, J Keane 0-1.	Referee: D Kirwan (Éire Óg)

22 June 2008 Round 3 replay	Blackrock	1-14 – 2-04	St. Finbarr’s	Páirc Uí Chaoimh, Cork
	A Coughlan 0-7, J Young 0-4, D Cashman 1-0, F Ryan 0-1, W Sherlock 0-1, C O'Leary 0-1.		S Nott 1-1, R O'Mahony 1-0, M Ryan 0-2, K Murray 0-1.	Referee: J Sexton (Ballyhea)

24 June 2008 Round 3	University College Cork	0-13 – 0-13	Imokilly	Riverstown Park, Glanmire
	J Halbert 0-6, B O'Sullivan 0-2, K Hartnett 0-2, S Moylan 0-1, J Crowley 0-1, M Wilkinson 0-1.		P O'Regan 0-5, J Flavin 0-2, B Lawton 0-2, R Spillane 0-2, E Enright 0-1, P O'Brien 0-1.	Referee: J Dorgan (Nemo Rangers)

30 June 2008 Round 3 replay	University College Cork	2-24 – 1-20 (aet)	Imokilly	Riverstown Park, Glanmire
	J Halbert 0-9, A Harte 0-6, G Mulcahy 1-1, A Nash 1-0, K Hartnett 0-3, S Moylan 0-2, R O'Brien 0-1, B O'Sullivan 0-1, J Crowley 0-1.		P O'Regan 0-10, J Flavin 1-1, B Ring 0-3, E Enright 0-2, R Spillane 0-2, B Coleman 0-1, T O'Keeffe 0-1.	Referee: A Cummins (Ballymartle)

=== Relegation play-offs ===
13 June 2008 Semi-final	Bishopstown	0-15 – 0-08	St. Catherine’s	Watergrasshill
	P Cronin 0-6, S O'Neill 0-3, J Murphy 0-2, P Honohan 0-1, T Creed 0-1, K McCarthy 0-1, T Murray 0-1.		S Cotter 0-2, K Morrison 0-2, M Fitzgerald 0-1, C Ahern 0-1, S Kearney 0-1, J Sheehan 0-1.	Referee: G Harrington (Carrigaline)

28 June 2008 Semi-final	Ballinhassig	1-15 – 1-11	Carrigtwohill	Páirc Uí Rinn, Cork
	P Coomey 1-2; D O’Callaghan 0-5 (0-3 frees); F O’Leary 0-3; M Coleman 0-2 (0-1 free); M Aherne, B O’Sullivan (free), D Dineen 0-1 each.	Report	N McCarthy 0-7 (0-6 frees); S Farrell 1-0; J Barrett 0-2; S Dineen, S Flannery 0-1 each.	Referee: D Copps (Ballyhea)

16 August 2008 Final	Carrigtwohill	1-12 – 1-10	St. Catherine’s	Clonmult Memorial Park, Midleton
	R White 0-6 (0-5f); S O’Farrell 1-0; N McCarthy, M Fitzgerald (0-1 65, 0-1 free) 0-2 each; J Barrett, S Flannery 0-1 each.	Report	S Cotter 0-4 (0-2f); J Sheehan 1-0; R O’Connell, K Morrison 0-2 each; S Kearney, M Fitzgerald (free) 0-1 each.	Referee: J Sexton (Ballyhea)

=== Quarter-finals ===
17 August 2008 Quarter-final	Glen Rovers	3-11 – 0-15	Blackrock	Páirc Uí Chaoimh, Cork
	P Horgan 1-6 (0-3 frees, 0-2 65s); E Cronin 2-0; D Cunningham, G Callinan, D Goggin, C O’Callaghan, D Busteed 0-1 each.	Report	A Browne 0-8 (0-2 frees); A Coughlan 0-3 (0-2 frees); C O’Leary 0-2; B O’Keeffe, J Young 0-1 each.	Referee: C McAlister (Aghada)

23 August 2008 Quarter-final	Bride Rovers	0-15 - 1-07	Avondhu	Páirc Mac Gearailt, Fermoy
	P Murphy 0-1, M Kearney 0-1, S Ryan 0-2, J O’Driscoll 0-4 (0-2 f, 0-1 pen), B Johnson 0-6 (0-3 65, 0-1f), C O’Keeffe 0-1.	Report	J O’Callaghan 0-4 (0-2f), A O’Brien (Kildorrery (0-1), P O’Brien (1-1), P Dineen (0-1).

24 August 2008 Quarter-final	Erin's Own	2-12 – 0-14	University College Cork	Clonmult Memorial Park, Midleton
	E Murphy 1-7 (0-6f), D O’Flynn 1-1, S Bowen 0-2 (0-2f), M Murphy, K Murphy 0-1 each.	Report	J Halbert 0-6 (0-4f, 0-1 ‘65), M Cahill 0-3, B O’Sullivan 0-2, A Nash (0-1f), D O’Sullivan, K Hartnett 0-1 each.	Referee: A Cummins (Ballymartle)

6 September 2008 Quarter-final	Sarsfield's	1-16 – 1-12	Newtownshandrum	Páirc Uí Chaoimh, Cork
	P Ryan 0-7 (0-4f, 0-2 '65's), T Óg Murphy 1-2, R O' Driscoll and K Murphy 0-3, P Barry 0-1.	Report	R Clifford 1-2, B 0' Connor 0-5 (0-2 frees), C Naughton 0-3, J.P King 0-2.	Referee: D Kirwan (Éire Óg)

=== Semi-finals ===
6 September 2008 Semi-final	Bride Rovers	1-11 - 1-09	Erin's Own	Páirc Uí Chaoimh, Cork
	J O’Driscoll 0-7 (0-6f), M Collins 1-2, B Johnson and M Kearney 0-1 each.	Report	M O’Connor 1-2, S Kelly and E Murphy (0-1f) 0-2 each, D O’Flynn, K Murphy, M O’Carroll 0-1 each.	Referee: C Lyons (Nemo Rangers)

14 September 2008 Semi-final	Sarsfield's	1-20 - 1-18	Glen Rovers	Páirc Uí Chaoimh, Cork
	P Ryan 0-5 (0-3f, 0-2 '65), C McCarthy 1-1, T Og Murphy 1-0, P Barry 0-3, M Cussen, R O'Driscoll 0-2 each, K Murphy 0-1.	Report	P Horgan 0-7 (0-4f, 0-2 '65), E Cronin 0-4, D Cunningham, D Busteed, K O'Callaghan, G Callinan, D Goggin, J Anderson 0-1 each.	Referee: D Copps (Ballyhea)

=== Final ===
28 September 2008 Final	Sarsfield's	2-14 – 2-13	Bride Rovers	Páirc Uí Chaoimh, Cork
	P Ryan 0-6, M Cussen 1-2, R O’Driscoll 1-0, K Murphy 0-2, C McCarthy 0-1, D Kearney 0-1, D Roche 0-1, T Óg Murphy 0-1.	Report	S Ryan 1-3, J O’Driscoll 0-6, K Collins 1-0, B Johnson 0-2, M Collins 0-1, R Cahill 0-1.	Attendance: 12,136; Referee: J Sexton (Ballyhea)

== Championship statistics ==
=== Scoring ===
- Widest winning margin: 19 points
  - UCC 3-22 : 1-9 Carbery (Divisional draw)
- Most goals in a match: 5
- Most points in a match: 44
  - UCC 2-24 : 1-20 Imokilly (Round Three replay)
- Most goals by one team in a match: 4
  - Seandún 4-4 : 1-24 CIT (Divisional draw)
- Most goals scored by a losing team: 4
  - Seandún 4-4 : 1-24 CIT (Divisional draw)
- Most points scored by a losing team: 23
  - Imokilly 1-20 : 2-24 UCC (Round Three replay)

== Top scorers ==
Top scorers overall

Rank	Player	Club	Tally	Total	Matches	Average
1	Patrick Horgan	Glen Rovers	1-43	46	5	9.20
2	Jerome O'Driscoll	Bride Rovers	2-34	40	7	5.71
3	Timmy McCarthy	Castlelyons	3-29	38	4	9.50
4	Eoghan Murphy	Erin's Own	2-23	29	4	7.25
4	Pat Ryan	Sarsfields	0-29	29	5	5.80
5	John Halbert	UCC	1-23	26	4	6.50
6	Paddy O'Regan	Imokilly	0-24	24	3	8.00
7	Joe Deane	Killeagh	0-23	23	3	7.66
8	Ben O'Connor	Newtownshandrum	0-22	22	3	7.33
9	Paudie O'Sullivan	Cloyne	1-18	21	4	5.25
9	Mickey O'Connell	Midleton	1-18	21	4	5.25

Top scorers in a single game

Rank	Player	Club	Tally	Total	Opposition
1	Patrick Horgan	Glen Rovers	0-13	13	Cloyne
1	Neil Ronan	Avondhu	0-13	13	Muskerry
2	Timmy McCarthy	Castlelyons	2-06	12	St. Catherine's
2	Adrian Mannix	CIT	0-12	12	Carrigdhoun
3	Timmy McCarthy	Castlelyons	2-05	11	Newtownshandrum
3	Patrick Horgan	Glen Rovers	0-11	11	Cloyne
2	Eoghan Murphy	Erin's Own	1-07	10	Blackrock
2	Paudie O'Sullivan	Cloyne	1-07	10	Glen Rovers
2	Eoghan Murphy	Erin's Own	1-07	10	UCC
2	Paddy O'Regan	Imokilly	0-10	10	UCC
2	Mickey O'Connell	Midleton	0-10	10	St. Catherine's
2	Joe Deane	Killeagh	0-10	10	Erin's Own

=== Miscellaneous ===
- Sarsfields won the championship for the first time since 1957
- Sarsfields qualify for the final for first time since 1997
- Bride Rovers qualify for the final for the first time.
