= Timmy Kelleher =

Irish hurler

Personal information
- Native name: Tadhg Ó Céileachair (Irish)
- Born: 24 November 1970 (age 55) Birmingham, England
- Occupation: Factory supervisor

Sport
- Sport: Hurling
- Position: Right wing-forward
Club
- Years: Club
- 1987-2006: Erin's Own
Club titles
- Cork titles: 2
Inter-county
Years	County	Apps (scores)
1991-1997	Cork	9 (0-1)
Inter-county titles
- Munster titles: 1 (as sub)
- All-Irelands: 0
- NHL: 1 (as sub)
- All Stars: 0

Timothy M. Kelleher (born 24 November 1970) is an Irish former sportsperson. He played hurling with his local club Erin's Own and was a member of the Cork senior inter-county team from 1991 until 1997.
