= 2005 Cork Senior Hurling Championship =

Annual hurling competition season

- Dates: 27 May 2005 – 16 October 2005
- Teams: 24
- Sponsor: Evening Echo
- Champions: Newtownshandrum (3rd title); Brendan Mulcahy (captain); Bernie O'Connor (manager)
- Runners-up: Cloyne; Donal Óg Cusack (captain); Tomás O'Brien (manager)

Tournament statistics
- Matches played: 33
- Goals scored: 89 (2.7 per match)
- Points scored: 809 (24.52 per match)
- Top scorer(s): Paudie O'Sullivan (3-19)

The 2005 Cork Senior Hurling Championship was the 117th staging of the Cork Senior Hurling Championship since its establishment by the Cork County Board in 1887. The draw for the 2005 fixtures took place at the Cork Convention on 12 December 2004. The championship began on 27 May 2005 ended on 16 October 2005.

Na Piarsaigh were the defending champions, however, they were defeated by University College Cork at the quarter-final stage.

On 16 October 2005, Newtownshandrum won the championship following a 0–15 to 0–09 defeat of Cloyne in the final. This was their third championship title overall and their first in two championship seasons.

Cloyne's Paudie O'Sullivan was the championship's top scorer with 3–19.

== Team changes ==
=== To Championship ===
Promoted from the Cork Premier Intermediate Hurling Championship

- St. Catherine's

== Results ==
=== Divisions and colleges section ===
First round

27 May 2005 First round	Avondhu	1-14 - 0-08	Carrigdhoun	Páirc Mac Gearailt, Fermoy
	J O'Callaghan 1-6, D Relihan 0-3, D Moher 0-2, B Sheehan 0-1, M Allen 0-1, N Ronan 0-1.		D Dineen 0-3, B Lombard 0-3, J Mullaney 0-2.	Referee: K Hennessy (Midelton)

29 May 2005 First round	Imokilly	4-26 - 0-07	Seandún	Mayfield
	M Fitzgerald 2-3, P O'Neill 1-6, P Cahill 1-5, J Barrett 0-4, N McCarthy 0-3, B Coleman 0-3, E Loughlin 0-2.		C Barry 0-4, D Lucey 0-1, C Coughlan 0-1, M Hayes 0-1.	Referee: P Downey (Inniscarra)

29 May 2005 First round	Duhallow	1-11 - 0-13	Muskerry	Banteer
	F Browne 0-7, M Sheehy 1-0, D Dwane 0-1, S Whelan 0-1, K McCarthy 0-1, D Broderick 0-1.		D O'Riordan 0-6, J Hurley 0-3, J Russell 0-2, F Sheehan 0-1, J Hughes 0-1.	Referee: D Copps (Ballyhea)

Second round

4 June 2005 Second round	Avondhu	2-16 - 2-17	Imokilly	Rathcormac
	J O'Callaghan 1-10, D Moher 1-3, N Ronan 0-2, S Fox 0-1.		P Cahill 1-1, M Fitzgerald 0-4, N McCarthy 1-0, G O'Leary 0-3, J Barrett 0-3, P O'Regan 0-2, P O'Neill 0-2, B Coleman 0-1, L Greaney 0-1.	Referee: D Kirwan (Éire Óg)

4 June 2005 Second round	Duhallow	1-11 - 1-11	Carbery	Coachford
	D Crowley 1-2, F Browne 0-3, D Broderick 0-2, S Whelan 0-1, D Dunne 0-1, D McCarthy 0-1, N O'Callaghan 0-1.		JP O'Callaghan 1-7, J Forristal 0-2, V O'Brien 0-1, K O'Donovan 0-1.	Referee: D Copps (Ballyhea)

11 June 2005 Second round replay	Duhallow	1-10 - 1-16	Carbery	Cloughduv
	D Crowley 1-3, F Browne 0-2, K McCarthy 0-2, D Duane 0-2, N O'Callaghan 0-1.		JP O'Callaghan 1-8, K O'Donovan 0-3, M Walsh 0-2, G Coleman 0-1, D Lucey 0-1, J Forristal 0-1.	Referee: D Copps (Ballyhea)

=== Preliminary round ===
7 May 2005 Preliminary round	St. Finbarr's	1-17 - 2-13	Killeagh	Clonmult Memorial Park, Midleton
	K Murray 1-5, D O'Regan 0-3, M Ryan 0-3, A Fitzpatrick 0-2, R Curran 0-2, A Cronin 0-1, B O'Driscoll 0-1.		J Deane 0-7, B Barry 1-3, C Crowley 1-1, M Landers 0-2.	Referee: J Sexton (Ballyhea)

=== First round ===
26 May 2005 First round	Killeagh	1-11 - 2-11	Na Piarsaigh	Clonmult Memorial Park, Midleton
	J Deane 1-7, B Barry 0-2, L O'Connor 0-1, M Landers 0-1.		SG O'Sullivan 1-2, T Ó hAilpín 1-0, D Walsh 0-2, S Guiheen 0-2, SJ O'Sullivan 0-2, M Prendergast 0-1, R McGregor 0-1, J Gardiner 0-1.	Referee: J Sexton (Ballyhea)

28 May 2005 First round	St. Catherine's	0-13 - 0-13	Glen Rovers	Páirc Uí Rinn, Cork
	M Hegarty 0-6, C Casey 0-4, S Kearney 0-2, D Farrell 0-1.		J Anderson 0-6, S McGrath 0-2, P Horgan 0-2, D Cronin 0-1, K O'Callaghan 0-1, D Busteed 0-1.	Referee: R Murphy (Lyre)

28 May 2005 First round	Cloyne	2-22 - 1-05	Blackrock	Carrigtwohill
	P O'Sullivan 1-8, C Cusack 1-1, M Cahill 0-3, P Cahill 0-3, D O'Sullivan 0-2, V Cusack 0-2, J Cotter 0-2, I Quinlan 0-1.		L Meaney 1-1, A Coughlan 0-3, P Tierney 0-1.	Referee: J Sexton (Ballyhea)

28 May 2005 First round	Midleton	1-14 - 2-09	Douglas	Carrigtwohill
	M O'Connell 0-6, C Hurley 1-1, L Walsh 0-2, W O'Brien 0-2, A Ryan 0-1, S Corcoran 0-1, S Hennessy 0-1.		C O'Mahony 1-0, E Cadogan 1-0, P Barry 0-3, S Moylan 0-2, G McLoughlin 0-2, J Moylan 0-1, G Wade 0-1.	Referee: A Cummins (Ballymartle)

29 May 2005 First round	Bride Rovers	0-11 - 3-10	Sarsfields	Watergrasshill
	B Johnson 0-5, T Broderick 0-2, P Walsh 0-1, P Murphy 0-1, B Hazlewood 0-1, S Ryan 0-1.		J Murphy 2-1, G McCarthy 1-0, K Murphy 0-3, G O'Loughlin 0-2, P Ryan 0-2, C Duggan 0-1, T Óg Murphy 0-1.	Referee: G Harrington (Carrigaline)

29 May 2005 First round	Newtownshandrum	3-11 - 1-11	Castlelyons	Moore Park, Kilworth
	B O'Connor 0-4, J Bowles 1-0, Jerry O'Connor 1-0, D Mulcahy 1-0, John O'Connor 0-3, JP King 0-2, D Gleeson 0-2.		S McAuliffe 1-1, C McGann 0-3, T McCarthy 0-3, D Wallace 0-2, B Fitzgerald 0-1, E Fitzgerald 0-1.	Referee: M Myers (Whitechurch)

29 May 2005 First round	Delanys	2-10 - 5-13	Erin's Own	Riverstown Sportsfield, Glanmire
	J Egan 1-4, M McElhinney 1-0, L Lynch 0-3, C Foley 0-2, D McElhinney 0-1.		M O'Connor 3-6, K Murphy 1-2, S Daly 1-1, C Coakley 0-1, B Corcoran 0-1, A Lane 0-1, S Bowen 0-1.	Referee: D Farrell (Mitchelstown)

29 May 2005 First round	University College Cork	0-20 - 3-09	Cork Institute of Technology	Páirc Uí Rinn, Cork
	J Fitzpatrick 0-7, T Walsh 0-4, K Hartnett 0-2, J Tennyson 0-2, T Kenny 0-1, E Collins 0-1, P O'Brien 0-1, M Whelan 0-1, R Doherty 0-1.		M O'Sullivan 0-6, B Ring 1-1, S Dineen 1-0, M Fennelly 1-0, B O'Dwyer 0-1, V Hurley 0-1.	Referee: D Fleming (Blackrock)

4 June 2005 First round replay	St. Catherine's	1-15 - 0-15	Glen Rovers	Páirc Uí Rinn, Cork
	K Morrison 1-3, C Casey 0-6, M Hegarty 0-3, S Cotter 0-1, J Jnr Sheehan 0-1, C Hogan 0-1.		P Horgan 0-7, D Cronin 0-3, K O'Callaghan 0-2, S McGrath 0-1, T Murphy 0-1, L Tracey 0-1.	Referee: A Cummins (Ballymartle)

=== Second round ===
11 June 2005 Second round	Castlelyons	1-13 - 1-15	Douglas	Caherlag Sportsfield, Glounthaune
	Eoin Fitzgerald 0-8, D Wallace 1-0, S McAuliffe 0-2, Éamonn Fitzgerald 0-2, S Barrett 0-1.		S Moylan 0-9, G McLoughlin 1-1, M Harrington 0-1, J Moylan 0-1, T O'Dwyer 0-1, P Barry 0-1.	Referee: G Harrington (Carrigaline)

12 June 2005 Second round	Glen Rovers	1-13 - 3-15	Bride Rovers	Páirc Uí Rinn, Cork
	P Horgan 1-5, L Tracey 0-2, G Callinan 0-2, D Dorris 0-1, R Kelleher 0-1, S McGrath 0-1, D Cronin 0-1.		B Murphy 2-0, B Johnson 1-3, B Hazelwood 0-5, P Cotter 0-3, S Ryan 0-1, P Murphy 0-1, D Ryan 0-1, T Broderick 0-1.	Referee: D Kirwan (Éire Óg)

10 July 2005 Second round	Cork Institute of Technology	2-14 - 2-18	Blackrock	Páirc Uí Rinn, Cork
	M O'Sullivan 0-6, J Dixon 1-1, B Coleman 0-4, M Coleman 1-0, B Ring 0-1, M Kelly 0-1, F Flannery 0-1.		A Browne 1-7, A Coughlan 0-5, L Meaney 1-0, D Cashman 0-2, A Cummins 0-1, F Ryan 0-1, P Tierney 0-1, B Hennebry 0-1.	Referee: D Kirwan (Éire Óg)

- Delanys received a bye.

=== Third round ===
2 July 2005 Third round	Cloyne	5-08 - 1-08	Carbery	Páirc Uí Rinn, Cork
	P O'Sullivan 2-2, V Cusack 1-2, P Cahill 1-0, C Cusack 1-0, Donal O'Sullivan 0-1, Diarmuid O'Sullivan 0-1, J Cotter 0-1, I Quinlan 0-1.		K O'Donovan 0-4, M Walsh 1-0, M O'Callaghan 0-2, JP O'Callaghan 0-1, V O'Brien 0-1.	Referee: J Kearney (Na Piarsaigh)

8 July 2005 Third round	Erin's Own	4-17 - 2-15	Imokilly	Killeagh
	K Murphy 1-9, C O'Connor 1-2, M O'Connor 1-1, S Daly 1-1, C O'Neill 0-1, M Buckley 0-1, F Murphy 0-1, E Murphy 0-1.		M Fitzgerald 1-8, E O'Loughlin 1-0, N McCarthy 0-3, D Barrett 0-2, P Cahill 0-1, B Coleman 0-1.	Referee: J Sexton (Ballyhea)

9 July 2005 Third round	Na Piarsaigh	1-14 - 0-07	St. Catherine's	Clonmult Memorial Park, Midleton
	SG O'Sullivan 1-4, S O'Sullivan 0-2, D Walsh 0-2, D Gardiner 0-2, R McGregor 0-1, M Prendergast 0-1, S Guiheen 0-1, G Shaw 0-1.		M Hegarty 0-4, J Sheehan 0-1, P O'Neill 0-1, K Morrison 0-1.	Referee: A Cummins (Ballymartle)

9 July 2005 Third round	University College Cork	3-18 - 0-07	Douglas	Páirc Uí Rinn, Cork
	E Collins 0-9, T Walsh 1-2, M Rice 1-2, R Conway 0-4, D O'Connell 1-0, T Kenny 0-1.		M Harrington 0-5, E Cadogan 0-1, BG O'Loughlin 0-1.	Referee: D Farrell (Mitchelstown)

9 July 2005 Third round	Newtownshandrum	0-16 - 0-14	Bride Rovers	Páirc Mac Gearailt, Fermoy
	B O'Connor 0-6, G O'Connor 0-3, C Naughton 0-3, AT O'Brien 0-2, JP King 0-1, J Bowles 0-1.		B Hazelwood 0-6, P Murphy 0-3, B Johnson 0-2, T Broderick 0-2, Brian Murphy 0-1.	Referee: D Kirwan (Éire Óg)

29 July 2005 Third round	Blackrock	0-12 - 0-06	Delanys	Páirc Uí Chaoimh, Cork
	A Browne 0-4, A Coughlan 0-4, B O'Keeffe 0-2, B Hennebry 0-1, G Buckley 0-1.		L Lynch 0-3, M McElhinney 0-2, T Kiely 0-1.	Referee: C McAllister (Midleton)

31 July 2005 Third round	St. Finbarr's	3-12 - 0-12	Midleton	Carrigtwohill
	R O'Mahony 2-0, M Ryan 0-4, C McCarthy 1-0, D O'Regan 0-3, A Cronin 0-1, R McCarthy 0-1, A Fitzpatrick 0-1, K Murray 0-1, R Curran 0-1.		M O'Connell 0-7, L Walsh 0-2, S Hennessy 0-1, G Manley 0-1, A Cotter 0-1.	Referee: K Healy (Ballymartle)

- Sarsfields received a bye.

=== Quarter-finals ===
20 August 2005 Quarter-final	University College Cork	1-12 - 1-10	Na Piarsaigh	Páirc Uí Chaoimh, Cork
	N Moloney 0-7 (0-5 frees, 0-1 65); R Flannery 1-0; P O’Brien 0-2; R O’Doherty, T Kenny, E Hanley 0-1 each.	Report	J Gardiner 0-4 (0-1 free); T Ó hAilpín 1-1; SG O’Sullivan 0-3 (0-1 free); R McGregor, C O’Sullivan 0-1 each.	Referee: J Sexton (Ballyhea)

20 August 2005 Quarter-final	St. Finbarr's	2-14 - 1-13	Blackrock	Páirc Uí Chaoimh, Cork
	R Curran 1-3 (1-0 pen; 0-2 from frees; 0-1 from 65); R O’Mahony 1-0; K Murray 0-5 (0-3 frees); R McCarthy 0-2; C McCarthy 0-2; G McCarthy and M Ryan 0-1 each.	Report	D Gosnell 1-1; A Browne 0-4 (0-2 from frees); A Coughlan 0-3 (0-2 from frees; 0-1 from 65); B Hennebry 0-2; G Cleary, D Cashman and B O’Keeffe 0-1 each.	Referee: K Healy (Ballymartle)

21 August 2005 Quarter-final	Cloyne	6-09 - 0-08	Sarsfield's	Páirc Uí Chaoimh, Cork
	C O’Sullivan 2-2, C Cusack 2-1, V Cusack, P Cahill 1-0 each, P O’Sullivan 0-2 (both frees), Donal O’Sullivan, J Nyhan, J Cotter, Diarmuid O’Sullivan 0-1 each.	Report	P Ryan 0-2 (0-1 free), K Murphy, T Óg Murphy, N O’Sullivan, P O’Flynn, M Cussen, J Murphy (free) 0-1 each.	Referee: D Kirwan (Éire Óg)

Newtownshandrum	w/o - scr.	Erin's Own

=== Semi-finals ===
2 October 2005 Semi-final	Newtownshandrum	2-18 - 2-09	St. Finbarr's	Páirc Uí Chaoimh, Cork
	JP King 1-1; J Bowles 1-0; C Naughton 0-6; B O’Connor 0-5 (0-3 from frees); AT O’Brien, Jerry O’Connor, John O’Connor, D Mulcahy, J O’Mahony and P Noonan 0-1 each.	Report	K Murray 1-3 (0-3 from frees): D O’Regan 1-0; R Curran 0-3 (0-2 from frees; 0-1 from 65): G McCarthy, R O’Mahony and C McCarthy 0-1 each.	Referee: D Kirwan (Éire Óg)

2 October 2005 Semi-final	Cloyne	1-12 - 0-13	University College Cork	Páirc Uí Chaoimh, Cork
	D O'Sullivan 1-3; I Quinlan, V Cusack, P O'Sullivan, 0-2 each; P Cahill, C O'Sullivan, M Cahill 0-1 each.	Report	J Fitzpatrick 0-7; S O'Neill, K Hartnett, T Kenny, E Hanley, T Walsh, E Collins 0-1 each.	Referee: J Sexton (Ballyhea)

=== Final ===
16 October 2005 Final	Newtownshandrum	0-15 - 0-09	Cloyne	Páirc Uí Chaoimh, Cork
	B O'Connor 0-6, C Naughton, JP King, AT O'Brien 0-2 each, J O'Connor, D Mulcahy, P Noonan 0-1 each.	(report)	P O'Sullivan 0-5 (frees); V Cusack 0-2; I Quinlan, C O'Sullivan 0-1 each.	Referee: D Kirwan (Éire Og)

== Championship statistics ==
=== Top scorers ===
Top scorer overall

Rank	Player	Club	Tally	Total	Matches	Average
1	Paudie O'Sullivan	Cloyne	3-19	28	5	5.60
2	Mickey Fitzgerald	Imokilly	3-15	24	3	8.00
3	Jonathan O'Callaghan	Avondhu	2-16	22	2	11.00
3	John Paul O'Callaghan	Cloyne	2-16	22	3	7.33
4	Ben O'Connor	Newtownshandrum	0-21	21	4	5.25
5	Kevin Murray	St. Finbarr's	2-14	20	4	5.00
6	Mark O'Connor	Erin's Own	4-07	19	2	9.50
7	Alan Browne	Erin's Own	1-15	18	4	4.50
8	Kieran Murphy	Erin's Own	2-11	17	2	8.50
8	Joe Deane	Killeagh	1-14	17	2	8.50
8	Patrick Horgan	Glen Rovers	1-14	17	3	5.66

Top scorers in a single game

Rank	Player	Club	Tally	Total	Opposition
1	Mark O'Connor	Erin's Own	3-06	15	Delanys
2	Jonathan O'Callaghan	Avondhu	1-10	13	Imokilly
3	Kieran Murphy	Erin's Own	1-09	12	Imokilly
4	John Paul O'Callaghan	Carbery	1-08	11	Duhallow
4	Paudie O'Sullivan	Cloyne	1-08	11	Blackrock
4	Mickey Fitzgerald	Imokilly	1-08	11	Erin's Own
5	John Paul O'Callaghan	Carbery	1-07	10	Duhallow
5	Joe Deane	Killeagh	1-07	10	Na Piarsaigh
5	Alan Browne	Blackrock	1-07	10	CIT
6	Mickey Fitzgerald	Imokilly	2-03	9	Seandún
6	Jonathan O'Callaghan	Avondhu	1-06	9	Carrigdhoun
6	Pierce O'Neill	Imokilly	1-06	9	Seandún
6	Stephen Moylan	Douglas	0-09	9	Castlelyons
6	Éamonn Collins	UCC	0-09	9	Douglas
