= Cloyne GAA =

Gaelic sports club in County Cork, Ireland

Cloyne
- Cluain
- Founded: 1887
- County: Cork
- Colours
- Grounds: Christy Ring Memorial Park
- Coordinates: 51°51′26.93″N 8°07′02.83″W

Playing kits
Standard colours

Cloyne GAA is a Gaelic Athletic Association club in Cloyne, County Cork, Ireland. The club is affiliated to the East Cork Board and is primarily concerned with the game of hurling, but also fields teams in Gaelic football.

== History ==
Located in the town of Cloyne, about 5 miles from Midleton, Cloyne GAA Club was founded in 1887. The club spent much of its early existence operating in the junior grade. Cloyne made their first breakthrough in 1939 by winning the Cork JHC title, having won back-to-back East Cork JHC titles over the previous two years.

Cloyne eventually returned to the junior ranks and won another three East Cork JHC titles in a four year spell between 1958 and 1961. The last of these divisional titles was converted into a second Cork JHC title. The club eventually secured senior status after winning Cork IHC titles in 1966 and 1970.

The club eventually found itself back in the junior ranks again, before winning its third Cork JAHC titles in 1987. This was followed a decade later with a third Cork IHC title and senior status once more. Cloyne lost to Na Piarsaigh, Newtownshandrum and Erin's Own in three successive Cork SHC finals between 2004 and 2006.

== Honours ==
- Cork Senior Hurling League (1): 1998
- Cork Intermediate Hurling Championship (3): 1966, 1970, 1997
- Cork Junior A Hurling Championship (3): 1939, 1961, 1987
- East Cork Junior A Hurling Championship (9): 1938, 1939, 1944, 1958, 1960, 1961, 1976, 1986, 1987
- East Cork Junior A Football Championship (6): 1976, 2001, 2008, 2009, 2010, 2016
- Cork Minor Hurling Championship (6): 1938, 1949, 1984, 1987, 1988, 1989 (with Midleton)
- Cork Minor B Hurling Championship (1): 2005

== Notable players ==
- Donal Óg Cusack: All-Ireland SHC-winner (1999, 2004, 2005)
- Diarmuid O'Sullivan: All-Ireland SHC-winner (1999, 2004, 2005)
- Christy Ring: All-Ireland SHC-winner (1941, 1942, 1943, 1944, 1952, 1953, 1954)
