= 2016 Cork Senior Hurling Championship =

Annual hurling competition season

- Dates: 14 May – 15 October 2016
- Teams: 25
- Sponsor: Evening Echo
- Champions: Glen Rovers (27th title); Graham Callinan (captain); Richie Kelleher (manager)
- Runners-up: Erin's Own; Maurice O'Carroll (captain); Martin Bowen (manager)

Tournament statistics
- Matches played: 47
- Goals scored: 126 (2.68 per match)
- Points scored: 1540 (32.77 per match)
- Top scorer(s): Patrick Horgan (3-63); Eoghan Murphy (3-63)

The 2016 Cork Senior Hurling Championship was the 128th staging of the Cork Senior Hurling Championship since its establishment by the Cork County Board in 1887. The draw for the opening round fixtures took place on 13 December 2015. The championship ran from 15 May and to 15 October 2016.

Glen Rovers entered the championship as the defending champions.

The final was played on 9 October 2016 at Páirc Uí Rinn in Cork, between Glen Rovers and Erin's Own, in what was their first ever meeting in the final. Glen Rovers won the match by 0–19 to 2–11 to claim their 27th championship title overall and a second title in succession.

Patrick Horgan and Eoghan Murphy were the championship's top scorer with 3–63 each.

== Team changes ==
=== To Championship ===
Promoted from the Cork Premier Intermediate Hurling Championship

- Newcestown

== Results ==
=== Preliminary round ===
15 May 2016 Preliminary round	Killeagh	3-13 - 1-14	Muskerry	Páirc Uí Rinn
19:00	E Keniry (1-6, 3 frees, 1 65); D Cahill (2-1); D Walsh (0-3); S Smiddy (0-2); G Leahy (0-1).	Report	C Murphy (1-8, 1-0 65, 7 frees); S Bourke (0-2); M O’Sullivan, S O’Donoghue, I Barry-Murphy, J Jordan (0-1 each).	Referee: C Lyons (Nemo Rangers)

=== Round 1 ===
14 May 2015 Round 1	Avondhu	0-20 - 1-15	Ballymartle	Bride Park
	P O’Brien (0-12, 0-7 frees, 0-3 65s), K Morrisson, A Cagney and J Barry (0-2 each), D Hayes and P Herlihy (0-1 each).	Report	J Dwyer (1-2), D McCarthy (0-5, two frees), K Fitzpatrick (0-4, two frees), D O’Leary (0-3), B Dwyer (0-1).	Referee: C McAllister (Aghada)

28 May 2016 Round 1	Sarsfields	0-14 - 0-11	Carrigtwohill	Caherlag Grounds
19:30	C McCarthy 0-5 (3 frees, sideline); M Cussen 0-3; D Kearney 0-2; C Smith, C O’Sullivan, T Óg Murphy and J O’Connor 0-1 each.	Report	T Hogan 0-5 frees; N McCarthy 0-3; D O’Mahony 0-2; R White 0-1.	Referee: D Kirwan (Éire Óg)

28 May 2016 Round 1	Bride Rovers	1-21 - 1-13	Youghal	St Catherine's Park
19:30	B Johnson 1-8 (5 frees, 2 65s); R Whitty 0-5; D Dooley 0-3 (1 free); M Collins 0-2; S Glasgow, W Finnegan, S Walsh 0-1 each.	Report	B Ring 0-6 (4 frees), B Cooper 1-3, O Dempsey 0-2 (1 free), A Curtin, B Moloney 0-1 each.	Referee: C Lyons (Nemo Rangers)

29 May 2016 Round 1	Blackrock	1-22 - 1-13	Ballyhea	Mallow GAA Complex
14:00	K O’Keeffe 1-12 (1-0 pen, 10f); G Regan 1-1; D Farrell and S O’Keeffe 0-2 each; N Cashman, D Cashman, S Murphy and M O’Halloran 0-1 each.	Report	P O’Callaghan 0-8 (7f, 1 ‘65’); G Morrissey 1-0; M O’Sullivan 0-3; J Morrissey 0-2.	Referee: B Murphy (Carrigtwohill)

29 May 2016 Round 1	Douglas	2-18 - 1-18	Na Piarsaigh	Páirc Uí Rinn
14:15	A Cadogan 0-6; F Desmond 1-1; M O’Connor 0-4 (1 ‘65); M Dolan 1-0; M Collins 0-3; M Harrington and C Kingston 0-2 each.	Report	K Buckley 0-6 (4 frees); P Gould 1-1; D Lee 0-4; E Moynihan (2 frees) and A Hogan 0-2 each; I McDonnell, C Joyce and S Forde 0-1 each.	Referee: C McAllister (Aghada)

29 May 2016 Round 1	Glen Rovers	0-23 - 0-06	Carbery	Coachford Sportsfield
15:30	P Horgan (0-11, three frees, two 65s), C Dorris (0-3), B Phelan, L Coughlan and D Cunningham (0-2 each), D Dooling, P Virgo and Busteed (0-1 each).	Report	J Ryan (one free, one 65m) and J Sheehan (0-2 each), F Butler and S O’Shea (0-1 each).	Referee: J Larkin (Ballinora)

29 May 2016 Round 1	Killeagh	0-16 - 1-19	Newtownshandrum	Mallow GAA Complex
15:45	D Cahill 0-9 (0-8f); D Walsh 0-3; G Leahy, K Treacy, J O’Connor and K Murphy (free) 0-1 each.	Report	J Coughlan 1-4; R Clifford 0-6 (0-2f); S Griffin, M Thompson and M Bowles 0-2 each; C Twomey (free), T O’Mahony and C Naughton 0-1 each.	Referee: N Wall (Carrigaline)

29 May 2016 Round 1	Midleton	2-16 - 0-12	Bishopstown	Páirc Uí Rinn
16:00	L O’Farrell 2-4; C Walsh 0-6 (2 frees); C Lehane (1 free) and D Ryan 0-2 each; B Hartnett and J Nagle 0-1 each.	Report	P Cronin 0-7 (5 frees); T Murray and B Murray 0-2 each; D Sexton 0-1.	Referee: K Healy (Ballymartle)

29 May 2016 Round 1	St. Finbarr's	2-15 - 1-15	Newcestown	Brinny Sportsfield
16:00	B Beckett (1-5, 3 frees); G O’Connor (1-1); D Cahalane, E Finn, E Dennehy (0-2), S Sherlock, E Maher, C Keane (0-1 each).	Report	T Horgan (1-2); E Kelly (0-4, 2 frees), D Twomey (0-3, 1 free, 1 ‘65’); F Keane (0-2); O Keane, T Twomey, M McSweeney, C Keane (0-1 each).	Referee: D Kirwan (Éire Óg)

5 June 2016 Round 1	Duhallow	1-21 - 1-16	Carrigdhoun	Coachford Sportsfield
	M Vaughan (0-8), D Hannon (0-6, four frees), K Sheehan (0-5), G Linehan (1-1), A Walsh (0-1).	Report	D Lordan (0-4, three frees), D O’Callaghan (1-0), F O’Leary (0-3), T Murphy (one free), R Walsh (one free), D O’Donovan (one 65m, one free) and K Canty (0-2 each), M Kennefick (0-1).	Referee: D Copps (Ballyhea)

6 June 2016 Round 1	Imokilly	3-20 - 1-11	University College Cork	Riverstown Sportsfield
19:30	S. Harnedy 2-6; P. O’Sullivan 1-3 (1 free); D. Cahill 0-3; B. Dunne, W. Leahy, D. Dalton (frees) 0-2 each; N. Motherway, R. Denny 0-1 each.	Report	R. O’Shea 0-3 (1 free); D. McCarthy 1-0; B. McCarthy, S. Hayes, C O’Leary 0-2 each; C. O’Gorman, B. O’Connell 0-1 each.

11 June 2016 Round 1	Erin's Own	1-17 - 1-16	Cork Institute of Technology	Church Road
19:30	E Murphy (0-10, 0-4 frees, 0-1 ’65); J O’Carroll (0-4); C O’Callaghan (1-1); S Horgan, A Power (0-1 each).	Report	M Kearney (0-4, 0-2 frees); T O’Connor (1-0); J Cashman (0-3); R Barry (0-2 frees), J Cronin (0-2 each); P Collins (0-1 free), A Coffey, K Kavanagh (0-1 each).	Referee: J Larkin (Douglas)

=== Round 2A ===
19 June 2016 Round 2A	Midleton	3-21 - 1-15	Newtownshandrum	Páirc Uí Rinn
20:00	C Lehane 1-5, B Hartnett 2-1, C Walsh 0-7, L O'Farrell 0-4, S Smyth, K Burke, S O'Farrell and P O'Farrell 0-1 each.		T O'Mahony 1-5, M Ryan 0-6, M Thompson 0-2, L Clarson and S Griffin 0-1 each.	Referee: D Kirwan (Éire Óg)

25 June 2016 Round 2A	Avondhu	0-15 - 2-15	Bride Rovers	Castltownroche Grounds
19:30	A Cagney 0-4, H O'Gorman 0-2, S O'Connell 0-2, J Barry 0-2, S Ronayne 0-1, P Herlihy 0-1, D O'Reilly 0-1, K Morrison 0-1, J Hayes 0-1.		B Johnson 1-8, M Collins 1-1, D Dooley 0-3, D Fitzgerald 0-1, R Whitty 0-1, S Walsh 0-1.	Referee: N Wall (Carrigaline)

16 July 2016 Round 2A	Blackrock	2-17 - 1-18	Duhallow	Páirc Uí Rinn
18:15	M O'Halloran 2-2, K O'Keeffe (2f) and S O'Keeffe 0-4 each, D Meaney 0-3, D Cashman 0-2, C Cormack and G Regan 0-1 each.		D Hannon 1-5 (1-2f), DJ O'Sullivan, A Walsh, G Linehan and W Egan 0-2 each, M Vaughan, M Ellis, L O'Keeffe (f), B Weathers and L O'Neill 0-1 each.	Referee: C McAllister (Aghada)

16 July 2016 Round 2A	Glen Rovers	2-22 - 3-19 (aet)	Sarsfields	Páirc Uí Rinn
20:00	P Horgan 1-13 (1-9f), D Brosnan 1-2, C Dorris and D Noonan 0-3 each, D Dooling 0-1.		C McCarthy 2-4 (1-1f and 2 sideline), D Kearney 1-4, L Hackett 0-4, M Cussen 0-3, T Óg Murphy 0-2, C O'Sullivan and E O'Sullivan 0-1 each.	Referee: C Lyons (Nemo Rangers)

17 July 2016 Round 2A	St. Finbarr's	3-26 - 4-23 (aet)	Erin's Own	Páirc Uí Rinn
15:30	E Finn 1-12 (6f, 1 '65'), E Maher 1-3, D Cahalane 0-6 (1f), B Beckett 1-1 (1f), B Hennessy, G O'Connor, C Keane, S Sherlock 0-1 each.		E Murphy 2-12 (8f), M Carroll 2-1, M Collins 0-3, A Power, S Kelly 0-2 each, K Murphy, C O'Mahony, J O'Carroll 0-1 each.	Referee: D Copps (Ballyhea)

24 July 2016 Round 2A replay	St. Finbarr's	0-13 - 3-19	Erin's Own	Páirc Uí Rinn
14:15	B Beckett 0-6 (4f), E Finn (1 65, 1f) and C Keane 0-2 each, D Cahalane (1f), O Murphy and R O'Mahony 0-1 each.		E Murphy 1-7 (4f), M O'Carroll 2-2, M Collins and A Power 0-2 each, S Cronin, S Kelly, K Murphy, R O'Flynn, J O'Flynn and S Bowen (1f) 0-1 each.	Referee: N Wall (Carrigaline)

24 July 2016 Round 2A replay	Glen Rovers	3-17 - 4-12	Sarsfields	Páirc Uí Rinn
16:00	P Horgan 1-8 (1-4f), D Brosnan 1-3, G Kennefick 1-1, B Moylan 0-3 (1f), C Dorris and D Cronin 0-1 each.		M Cussen 2-2, D Kearney 2-1, C McCarthy (1f), G O'Loughlin and E Quigley 0-2 each, T Óg Murphy, D Roche and E Murphy 0-1 each.	Referee: J Larkin (Ballinora)

7 August 2016 Round 2A	Douglas	4-20 - 2-24	Imokilly	Páirc Uí Rinn
19:30	M O'Connor 0-11, C Kingston 2-1, A Cadogan 0-6, S Kingston 1-2, M Harrington 1-0.		S Harnedy 0-5, P O'Sullivan and B Dunne 1-1 each, S O'Regan and B Lawton 0-4 each, B Mulcahy, J Cahill, D Kelleher and D Dalton 0-2 each, S O'Callaghan 0-1.	Referee: D Kirwan (Éire Óg)

=== Round 2B ===
18 June 2016 Round 2B	Carrigtwohill	1-10 - 2-14	Ballyhea	Moore Park
19:30	R White 1-3, T Hogan 0-3, D O'Mahony 0-2, J Horgan and D O'Driscoll 0-1 each.		P O'Callaghan 0-10, G Morrissey 2-1, M O'Sullivan 0-2, J O'Sullivan 0-1.	Referee: M Maher (St. Finbarr's)

1 July 2016 Round 2B	Ballymartle	4-31 - 0-14	Carbery	Páirc Uí Ríogáin
19:30	K Fitzpatrick 1-10, D McCarthy 2-3, B Dwyer 0-6, S O'Mahony 1-2, J Dwyer 0-4, R Cahalane 0-3, D O'Leary 0-2, A Gould 0-1.		JM O'Callaghan 0-5, D Lowney 0-3, K O'Donovan 0-2, R Cashman 0-1, S O'Shea 0-1, J Sheehan 0-1, C Cullinane 0-1.	Referee: J Larkin (Ballinora)g

16 July 2016 Round 2B	Newcestown	1-11 - 2-14	Carrigdhoun	Coachford Sportsfield
	M Bradfield 0-5 (5f), C Keane 1-0, J Meade 0-3 (2f and 1 '65'), A Shorten, L Meade and S O'Donovan 0-1 each.		D Drake 1-4 (1f), D O'Callaghan 1-1, D Lordan 0-4 (3f), K Canty 0-2, J Cottrell, W O'Brien and M Desmond 0-1 each.	Referee: J Bermingham (Bride Rovers)

17 July 2016 Round 2B	Killeagh	4-12 - 1-20	University College Cork	Clonmult Memorial Park
19:00	David Cahill 1-6, (6f), S Smiddy 1-3, Darragh Cahill 1-1, G Leahy 1-0, K Murphy (f), K Treacy 0-1 each.		T Devine 1-4, R O'Shea 0-5 (4f), C Roche, S Hayes 0-3 each, A Spillane, C O'Leary 0-2 each, S Hegarty 0-1.	Referee: M O'Mahony (Kilbrittain)

17 July 2016 Round 2B	Muskerry	2-20 - 1-27	Cork Institute of Technology	Páirc Uí Rinn
19:30	E O'Shea 1-2, K Hallissey 0-5, M Coleman 0-5 (3f), I Coughlan 1-1, J Jordan 0-2, N O'Doherty, S O'Donoghue, J Ryan, G Murphy (1f), D Corkery 0-1 each.		M Kearney 0-9 (4f), T O'Connor 1-1, J O'Neill 0-4, R Barry 0-3 (2 65s), R Heffernan, J Cronin, J Cashman, D Buckley 0-2 each, C Hammersely, K Kavanagh 0-1 each.	Referee: B Murphy (Carrigtwohill)

1 August 2016 Round 2B	Youghal	1-07 - 0-15	Bishopstown	Páirc Séamus de Barra
15:30	B Ring 0-6, B Copper 1-0, D O'Connell 0-1.		T Murray 0-5, P Cronin 0-5, B Murray 0-3, C O'Donovan and C Luttrell 0-1 each.	Referee: N Wall (Carrigaline)

=== Round 3 ===
14 August 2016 Round 3	Killeagh	1-12 - 2-22	Imokilly	Clonmult Memorial Park
15:00	D Cahill 0-6, A Walsh 1-0, S Smiddy 0-3, D Walsh 0-2, K Lane 0-1.		P O'Sullivan 1-3, B Dunne 1-2, W Leahy 0-4, S Harnedy 0-3, D Dalton and B Lawton 0-2 each, M Russell, C O'Brien, S O'Callaghan, N Motherway, I Cahill and D Kelleher 0-1 each.	Referee: C Lyons (Nemo Rangers)

14 August 2016 Round 3	Na Piarsaigh	1-13 - 2-13	Ballymartle	Páirc Uí Rinn
15:45	K Buckley 0-5, I McDonnell 1-1, E Moynihan 0-3, P Gould 0-2, P O'Rourke and D Gunning 0-1 each.		D McCarthy 1-10, P Dwyer 1-0, K Fitzpatrick, J Dwyer and B Dwyer 0-1 each.	Referee: P O'Driscoll (Bride Rovers)

14 August 2016 Round 3	Ballyhea	0-18 - 3-20	Newtownshandrum	Dr Mannix Sportsfield
18:30	P O'Callaghan 0-14, J Morrissey 0-3, J O'Sullivan 0-1.		C Naughton 1-5, T O'Mahony 1-1, R Clifford 0-4, J Coughlan 1-0, M Ryan, JP King, D Stack, S Griffin 0-2 each, J Lane, L Clarson 0-1 each.	Referee: J Larkin (Douglas)

15 August 2016 Round 3	Cork Institute of Technology	2-21 - 0-17	Avondhu	Páirc Uí Rinn
19:30	J Cashman 0-11, N McNamara 1-3, P Kelleher 1-1, A Coffey 0-3, C Hammersley, P Morris, D Buckley 0-1 each.		P O'Brien 0-4, D Fitzgibbon and S Ronayne 0-3 each, P Herlihy 0-2, S Condon, J Saich, D O'Flynn, H O'Gorman and C O'Sullivan 0-1 each.	Referee: N Wall (Carrigaline)

20 August 2016 Round 3	Carrigdhoun	0-17 - 2-17	St. Finbarr's	Páirc Uí Rinn
	F O'Leary 0-7, D Drake 0-4, T Murphy 0-2, D Griffin, K McSweeney S McCarthy and J Cottrell 0-1 each.		R O'Mahony 1-1, E Finn and B Beckett 0-4 each, C Cahalane 1-0, D Cahalane and J Power 0-2 each, G O'Connor, E Maher, C Keane and I Lordan 0-1 each.	Referee: C McAllister (Aghada)

21 August 2016 Round 3	Bishopstown	0-16 - 0-13	Duhallow	Páirc Uí Rinn
16:00	T Murray 0-5, P Cronin 0-4, E McCarthy and B Murray 0-2 each, C Luttrell, M Power and R Conway 0-1 each.		D Hannon 0-6, S Howard 0-3, W Egan, M Vaughan, W Murphy and K Tarrant 0-1 each.	Referee: C McAllister (Aghada)

=== Round 4 ===
27 August 2016 Round 4	St. Finbarr's	2-24 - 2-10	Ballymartle	Páirc Uí Rinn, Cork
	I Lordan 1-6, B Beckett 1-3, E Finn 0-5, J Power 0-4, R O'Mahony 0-3, D Cahalane 0-2, C Cahalane 0-1.		S Corry 1-0, S O'Mahony 1-0, D McCarthy 0-3, J Dwyer 0-2, D O'Leary 0-1, P Dwyer 0-1, K Fitzpatrick 0-1, B Dwyer 0-1, R Cahalane 0-1.	Referee: C Lyons (Nemo Rangers)

28 August 2016 Round 4	Erin's Own	2-21 - 2-20	Imokilly	Páirc Uí Rinn, Cork
	E Murphy 0-13, J O'Flynn 1-0, C O'Mahony 1-0, M Collins 0-3, R O'Flynn 0-2, S Kelly 0-1, S Murphy 0-1, A Power 0-1.		S Harnedy 1-5, P O'Sullivan 0-8, W Leahy 1-1, D Dalton 0-2, N Motherway 0-1, D Cahill 0-1, D Kelleher 0-1, M O'Keeffe 0-1.

28 August 2016 Round 4	Sarsfields	1-15 - 2-21	Midleton	Páirc Uí Rinn, Cork
	C McCarthy 0-7, E O Sullivan 1-0, E Quigle 0-2, D Kearney 0-2, D Roche 0-1, M Cussen 0-1, G O'Loughlin 0-1, D Roche 0-1.		C Walsh 0-9, C Lehane 1-4, B Hartnett 1-0, P Haughney 0-3, L O'Farrell 0-2, J Nagle 0-2, S Smith 0-1.	Referee: J Larkin

28 August 2016 Round 4	Bishopstown	0-25 - 1-11	Newtownshandrum	Mallow GAA Complex
	T Murray 0-10, B Murray 0-5, P Cronin 0-3, R Conway 0-2, M Power 0-2, R Ryan 0-1, C Luttrell 0-1, C Hegarty 0-1.		C Naughton 1-1, M Ryan 0-3, R Clifford 0-3, J Coughlan 0-2, T O'Mahony 0-1, M Bowles 0-1.	Referee: N Wall (Carrigaline)

3 September 2016 Round 4	Cork Institute of Technology	1-16 - 1-17	Douglas	Páirc Uí Rinn, Cork
18:00	A Coffey 0-7, P Kelleher 1-1, J Cronin 0-3, N McNamara, R Hanely 0-2 each, K Kavanagh 0-1.		M O'Connor 0-8, A Cadogan 0-3, E O'Brien 1-0, S Kingston 0-2, P Shine, J Collins, C Lucey, A Ward 0-1 each.	Referee: M O'Mahony (Kilbrittain)

=== Relegation play-offs ===
14 October 2016 Playoff	Carrigtwohill	2-11 - 2-09	Youghal	Páirc Uí Chinnéide
	R White 1-6, O Baverstock 1-0, N McCarthy 0-2, M O'Riordan 0-1, D O'Driscoll 0-1, T Hogan 0-1.		Brendan Ring 0-6, D Ring 1-0, J O'Mahony 1-0, C O'Mahony 0-1, A Joyce 0-1, N Roche 0-1.	Referee: C McAllister (Aghada)

15 October 2016 Playoff	Newcestown	3-10 - 0-18	Na Piarsaigh	Cloughduv Grounds
	P Guest 0-5, P Gould 1-1, C O'Mahony 1-1, E Hanafin 1-1, P Cunningham 0-1.	Report	D Twomey 0-5, E Kelly 0-5, L Meade 0-4, C Dineen 0-3, T Horgan 0-1.	Referee: D Kirwan (Éire Óg)

=== Quarter-finals ===
9 September 2016 Quarter-final	Midleton	2-20 - 2-13	St. Finbarr's	Páirc Uí Rinn
19:30	J Nagle 2-1, C Lehane 0-6, C Walsh 0-6, L O'Farrell 0-3, B Hartnett 0-2, P Haughney 0-1, P White 0-1.		B Beckett 1-2, E Finn 0-5, I Lordan 1-1, E Dennehy 0-2, B Hennessy 0-1, G O'Connor 0-1, R O'Mahony 0-1.	Referee: C Lyons (Nemo Rangers)

10 September 2016 Quarter-final	Bride Rovers	0-16 - 0-18	Douglas	Páirc Uí Rinn
	B Johnson 0-9, S Walsh 0-2, S Glasgow 0-1, M Collins 0-1, S Kearney 0-1, R Whitty 0-1, J Mannix 0-1.		M O'Connor 0-9, S Kingston 0-5, A Cadogan 0-3, M Collins 0-1.	Referee: N Wall (Carrigaline)

10 September 2016 Quarter-final	Glen Rovers	1-17 - 0-15	Bishopstown	Páirc Uí Rinn
	P Horgan 0-12, P Cunningham 1-0, D Dooling 0-1, D Noonan 0-1, M Dooley 0-1, C Dorris 0-1, D Brosnan 0-1.		P Cronin 0-4, M Power 0-4, T Murray 0-3, B Murray 0-2, E McCarthy 0-1, M O'Driscoll 0-1.	Referee: C McAllister (Aghada)

11 September 2016 Quarter-final	Blackrock	1-08 - 1-11	Erin's Own	Páirc Uí Rinn
	T Deasy 1-0, J Cashman 0-2, A O'Callaghan 0-1, D O'Farrell 0-1, D Meaney 0-1, S O'Keeffe 0-1, M O'Halloran 0-1, K O'Keeffe 0-1.		E Murphy 0-6, J O'Flynn 1-2, C Coakley 0-1, K Murphy 0-1.	Referee: D Kirwan (Éire Óg)

=== Semi-finals ===
25 September 2016 Semi-final	Midleton	1-15 - 2-13	Erin's Own	Páirc Uí Rinn
	C Walsh 0-7, C Lehane 0-4, L O'Farrell 1-0, F O'Mahony, J Nagle, B Hartnett and P White 0-1 each.		E Murphy 0-7, K Murphy 1-1, R O'Flynn 0-3, C O'Callaghan 1-0, M Collins 0-2, A Power 0-1.	Referee: J Larkin (Ballinora)

25 September 2016 Semi-final	Glen Rovers	1-19 - 1-13	Douglas	Páirc Uí Rinn
	P Horgan 1-7, C Dorris 0-6, D Busteed and D Cunningham 0-2 each, D Dooling and G Kennefick 0-1 each.		A Cadogan 0-7, M Collins 1-0, M O'Connor 0-3, S Kingston 0-2, T Delaney 0-1.	Referee: D Copps (Ballyhea)

=== Final ===
9 October 2016 Final	Erin's Own	2-11 - 0-19	Glen Rovers	Páirc Uí Rinn
16:00	E Murphy (0-8, 0-5 frees, 0-1 ’65); M O’Carroll (1-); J O’Flynn (1-0); C O’Mahony (0-2).	Report	P Horgan (0-12, 0-6 frees, 0-2 ’65); D Brosnan (0-4); C Dorris (0-2), C O’Brien (0-1).	Referee: J Larkin (Ballinora)

== Championship statistics ==
=== Top scorers ===
Overall

Rank	Player	County	Tally	Total	Matches	Average
1	Patrick Horgan	Glen Rovers	3-63	72	6	12.00
1	Eoghan Murphy	Erin's Own	3-63	72	7	10.28
3	Mark O'Connor	Douglas	0-35	35	5	7.00
3	Cormac Walsh	Midleton	0-35	35	5	7.00
5	Bill Beckett	St. Finbarr's	4-21	33	6	5.50
5	Eoghan Finn	St. Finbarr's	1-30	33	6	5.50
7	Pa O'Callaghan	Ballyhea	0-32	32	3	10.66
8	Barry Johnson	Bride Rovers	2-25	31	3	10.33
8	David Cahill	Killeagh	3-22	31	4	7.75
10	Darren McCarthy	Ballymartle	3-21	30	4	7.50

Single game

Rank	Player	Club	Tally	Total	Opposition
1	Eoghan Murphy	Erin's Own	2-12	18	St. Finbarr's
2	Patrick Horgan	Glen Rovers	1-13	16	Sarsfields
3	Kevin O'Keeffe	Blackrock	1-12	15	Ballyhea
3	Eoghan Finn	St. Finbarr's	1-12	15	Erin's Own
5	Pa O'Callaghan	Ballyhea	0-14	14	Newtownshandrum
6	Keith Fitzpatrick	Ballymartle	1-10	13	Carbery
6	Darren McCarthy	Ballymartle	1-10	13	Na Piarsaigh
6	Eoghan Murphy	Erin's Own	0-13	13	Imokilly
9	Séamus Harnedy	Imokilly	2-6	12	UCC
9	Peter O'Brien	Avondhu	0-12	12	Ballymartle
9	Patrick Horgan	Glen Rovers	0-12	12	Bishopstown
9	Patrick Horgan	Glen Rovers	0-12	12	Erin's Own

=== Miscellaneous ===
- Glen Rovers retained the title for the first time since 1960. They became the first team since Erin's Own in 2007 to retain the championship.
