= Eoghan Finn =

Irish hurler and Gaelic footballer

Personal information
- Native name: Eoghan Ó Finn (Irish)
- Born: 1993 (age 32–33) Cork, Ireland
- Occupation: Senior analyst

Sport
- Sport: Hurling
- Position: Left wing-forward
Club*
Years	Club	Apps (scores)
2011-present	St Finbarr's	25 (2-90)
Club titles
	Football	Hurling
Cork titles	1	1
College
- Years: College
- 2011-2016: University College Cork
College titles
- Fitzgibbon titles: 0
Inter-county**
Years	County	Apps (scores)
2017-2018	Cork	0 (0-00)
Inter-county titles
- Munster titles: 0
- All-Irelands: 0
- NHL: 0
- All Stars: 0
- * club appearances and scores correct as of 23:07, 15 September 2019. **Inter County team apps and scores correct as of 18:50, 22 April 2019.

Eoghan Finn (born 1993) is an Irish hurler and Gaelic footballer who plays for Cork Senior Championship club St Finbarr's. He usually lines out as a left wing-forward. Finn is a former member at senior level of the Cork county team.

== Career statistics ==
=== Club ===
As of match played 1 October 2023.

Team	Year	Cork		Munster		Total	
Team	Year	Apps	Score	Apps	Score	Apps	Score
St Finbarr's	2011	1	0-00	—		1	0-00
St Finbarr's	2012	2	0-09	—		2	0-09
St Finbarr's	2013	3	0-07	—		3	0-07
St Finbarr's	2014	1	0-02	—		1	0-02
St Finbarr's	2015	4	0-06	—		4	0-06
St Finbarr's	2016	6	1-30	—		6	1-30
St Finbarr's	2017	2	0-04	—		2	0-04
St Finbarr's	2018	3	0-08	—		3	0-08
St Finbarr's	2019	3	1-24	—		3	1-24
St Finbarr's	2020	3	0-15	—		3	0-15
St Finbarr's	2021	3	0-06	—		3	0-06
St Finbarr's	2022	5	1-07	1	0-00	6	1-07
St Finbarr's	2021	5	0-02	—		5	0-02
Career total		41	3-120	1	0-00	42	3-120

== Honours ==
Coláiste Chríost Rí

- Corn Uí Mhuirí: 2011

University College Cork

- All-Ireland Freshers' Hurling Championship: 2012

St. Finbarr's

- Cork Premier Senior Hurling Championship: 2022
- Cork Senior Football Championship: 2018
