= 2019 Cork Senior Hurling Championship =

Annual hurling competition season

- Dates: 26 March 2019 – 20 October 2019
- Teams: 27
- Sponsor: Evening Echo
- Champions: Imokilly (5th title); Séamus Harnedy (captain); Fergal Condon (manager)
- Runners-up: Glen Rovers; Brian Moylan (captain); Richie Kelleher (manager)

Tournament statistics
- Matches played: 36
- Goals scored: 78 (2.17 per match)
- Points scored: 1191 (33.08 per match)
- Top scorer(s): Declan Dalton (3-55)

The 2019 Cork Senior Hurling Championship was the 131st staging of the Cork Senior Hurling Championship since its establishment by the Cork County Board in 1887. The draw for the 2019 opening round fixtures took place on 15 January 2019. The championship began on 26 March 2019 and ended on 20 October 2019.

The final was played at Páirc Uí Rinn in Cork, between defending champions Imokilly and Glen Rovers, in what was their first meeting in a final in 70 years. Original venue, Páirc Uí Chaoimh, was deemed unplayable due to an unsatisfactory playing surface. Imokilly won the match by 2–17 to 1–16 to claim their sixth championship title overall and a first three-in-a-row of titles since St. Finbarr's in 1982.

Imokilly's Declan Dalton was the championship's top scorer with 3-55.

== Team changes ==
=== To Championship ===
Promoted from the Cork Premier Intermediate Hurling Championship

- Charleville

== Results ==
=== Divisional/colleges section ===
26 March 2019 Round 1	Duhallow	1-15 - 5-17	Muskerry	Páirc Uí Chaoimh 4G Pitch, Cork
	E Brosnan 1-3, S Howard 0-3, J Murphy 0-2, S O'Reilly 0-2, J Forrest 0-2, K Tarrant 0-1, C Buttimer 0-1, B Weathers 0-1.		K Murphy 2-1, I Barry-Murphy 1-4, K Hallissey 1-3, S Bourke 0-4, P Kelleher 1-0, M Bradley 0-3, D Hanlon 0-1, A Murphy 0-1.	Referee: M Maher (St. Finbarr's)

26 March 2019 Round 1	Carrigdhoun	1-13 - 0-31	Imokilly	Páirc Uí Rinn, Cork
	T O'Sullivan 0-7, J O'Neill 1-1, C Butler 0-2, D Andrews 0-1, M Kennefick 0-1, M O'Sullivan 0-1.		P O'Sullivan 0-7, Barry Lawton 0-6, D Dalton 0-5, D Mangan 0-5, S Harnedy 0-4, Brian Lawton 0-2, C Broderick 0-1, M O'Keeffe 0-1.	Referee: J Larkin (Ballinora)

26 March 2019 Round 1	Avondhu	0-18 - 2-16	Carbery	Páirc Uí Rinn, Cork
	S Condon 0-5, C O'Brien 0-5, B Murphy 0-3, B O'Sullivan 0-1, H O'Gorman 0-1, K O'Connor 0-1, W Condon 0-1, L Cronin 0-1.		D Coakley 1-2, D McCarthy 0-5, J Sheehan 1-0, D O'Donovan 0-2, K O'Donovan 0-2, G O'Donovan 0-2, P Butler 0-2, N o'Donovan 0-1.	Referee: P O'Driscoll (Bride Rovers)

27 March 2019 Round 1	University College Cork	0-23 - 0-13	Cork Institute of Technology	Páirc Uí Rinn, Cork
	S Conway 0-8, C O'Leary 0-3, C Browne 0-3, T Millerick 0-2, M Devine 0-2, P Cadell 0-1, D Griffin 0-1, M Coleman 0-1, B Kelleher 0-1, S Hayes 0-1.		G Collins 0-7, B Everard 0-1, J Cooper 0-1, E Heffernan 0-1, K Galvin 0-1, K Duggan 0-1.	Referee: S Stokes (Tullylease)

2 April 2019 Round 2	University College Cork	2-17 - 0-16	Muskerry	Páirc Uí Rinn, Cork
	C O'Leary 1-4, S Conway 1-4, N Montgomery 0-3, M Coleman 0-2, M Devine 0-1, D Walsh 0-1, J Hannon 0-1, A Creed 0-1.		S Bourke 0-10, D Hanlon 0-3, M Verling 0-2, M Bradley 0-1.	Referee: C McAllister (Aghada)

2 April 2019 Round 2	Imokilly	0-24 - 0-10	Carbery	Páirc Uí Rinn, Cork
	D Dalton 0-9, Barry Lawton 0-3, Brian Lawton 0-3, M O'Keeffe 0-3, P O'Sullivan 0-1, J Cronin 0-1, S Óg O'Regan 0-1, D Mangan 0-1, B Cooper 0-1, S Hegarty 0-1.		JM O'Callaghan 0-5, G O'Donovan 0-2, D Coakley 0-1, P Butler 0-1, Cathal O'Donovan 0-1.	Referee: N Wall (Ballincollig)

=== Preliminary round ===
13 April 2019 Preliminary round	Erin's Own	3-07 - 2-08	Ballymartle	Páirc Uí Rinn, Cork
	E Murphy 1-2, M Collins 1-1, S Horgan 1-1, M O'Carroll 0-1, S Kelly 0-1, A Power 0-1.		S O'Mahony 0-4, P Geary 1-0, J O'Dwyer 1-0, D O'Leary 0-2, J Ryan 0-2.	Referee: J Larkin (Ballinora)

=== Round 1 ===
19 April 2019 Round 1	Sarsfields	2-24 - 0-11	Kanturk	Mallow GAA Complex, Mallow
	E O’Sullivan (2 65s, 4 frees)(0-9); L Hackett (2-1); J O’Connor (0-4); D Kearney (0-3); C O’Sullivan, (1 free), L Healy, A Myers (0-2 each); W Kearney (0-1).	Report	D Kenneally, D O’Connell, I Walsh (0-2 each); A Walsh, D O’Donoghue, L O’Keeffe (free), L McLoughlin, R Walsh (0-1 each).	Referee: D Copps (Ballyhea)

19 April 2019 Round 1	Bishopstown	1-14 - 1-13	Newtownshandrum	Mourne Abbey Sportsfield, M'abbey
	P Cronin (1-8, 0-6 frees, 1-0 pen); K O’Halloran (0-1 free), B Murray (0-1 sc); C Walsh, J Scally, M Power, S Lordan (0-1 each).	Report	J Coughlan (1-6, 0-5 frees); J Twomey (0-3); T O’Mahony (0-2); C O’Brien, J Lane (0-1 each).	Referee: C McAllister (Aghada)

20 April 2019 Round 1	Carrigtwohill	0-08 - 3-23	St. Finbarr's	Riverstown Sportsfield, Sallybrook
	L Gosnell 0-6 (f), P Hogan 0-1(f), J Horgan 0-1.	Report	E Finn 0-11 (0-9 f), C Keane 2-0, C Cahalane 1-4, R O’Mahony 0-3, S Hurley 0-2 f, B Hennessy, P Kelleher, B O’Connell 0-1 each.	Referee: N Wall (Ballincollig)

20 April 2019 Round 1	Charleville	1-27 - 1-25	Erin's Own	Páirc Uí Rinn, Cork
	D Fitzgibbon (0-14, 0-8 frees, 0-1 65), A Cagney (1-2), J Doyle (0-3), D Casey and T Hawe (0-2 each), C Carroll, K O’Connor, D O’Flynn and M Kavanagh (0-1 each).	Report	E Murphy (1-13, 0-8 frees, 0-1 65), M Collins (0-5), A Power (0-2), S Murphy, K Murphy, J O’Carroll, S Horgan and G O’Mahony.	Referee: C Lane (Banteer)

20 April 2019 Round 1	Blackrock	2-27 - 1-10	Ballyhea	Páirc Uí Rinn, Cork
	K O’Keeffe (1-7, 0-3 frees, 0-1 65), J O’Sullivan (1-3), Ciarán Cormack (0-4), N Cashman (0-3), S Murphy, T Deasy and D Meaney (0-2 each), A Murphy, D O’Farrell, S O’Keeffe and M O’Halloran (0-1 each).	Report	P O’Callaghan (0-7, 0-4 frees), M O’Sullivan (1-0), T Hanley (0-2), J Copps (0-1).	Referee: C McAllister (Aghada)

20 April 2019 Round 1	Douglas	1-18 - 1-12	Bride Rovers	Riverstown Sportsfield, Sallybrook
	S Kingston (0-8, 5 frees); A Cadogan (1-2); B Turnbull, D O'Mahony (0-3 each); M O'Connor (sideline), M Collins (0-1 each).	Report	B Johnson (1-6 frees); M Collins, W Finnegan, K Kearney, D Dooley, B Roche, R Prendergast (0-1 each).	Referee: S Stokes (Tullylease)

21 April 2019 Round 1	Killeagh	1-12 - 0-18	Na Piarsaigh	Páirc Uí Rinn, Cork
	G Leahy (1-2); E Keniry (0-4, 0-2 frees); S Walsh (0-3); R McCarthy (0-1 sc), K Treacy, S Smiddy (0-1 each);	Report	C Hanifin (0-4, 0-3 frees); D Connery (0-1 free), P Guest, E Sheehan, K Forde, S Forde (0-2 each); C Buckley, A Hogan, P Rourke, D Gunning (0-1 each).	Referee: M Maher (St. Finbarr's)

21 April 2019 Round 1	Glen Rovers	1-17 - 0-16	Midleton	Páirc Uí Rinn, Cork
	P Horgan (0-9, 0-4 frees); C Dorris (0-4); L Coughlan (0-3 each); S Kennefick (1-0); D Tynan (0-1).	Report	C Lehane (0-11, 0-5 frees, 0-1 ‘65); S O’Meara, R O’Regan (0-2 each); C Beausang (0-1).	Referee: C Lyons (Nemo Rangers)

21 April 2019 Round 1	Newcestown	0-17 - 1-17	Bandon	Ahamilla Sportsground, Clonakilty
	D Twomey (0-6 frees, 0-2 65s)(0-8); L Meade, J Meade (3 sidelines) (0-3 each); C Keane (0-2); D Buckley (0-1).	Report	R Crowley (0-9 frees)(1-10); A Murphy (0-3); M Sugrue, D Lucey, D Crowley, J Hickey (0-1 each).	Referee: D Kirwan (Éire Óg)

=== Round 2 ===
4 August 2019 Round 2	Newcestown	1-21 - 6-13	Newtownshandrum	Páirc Uí Rinn, Cork
	D Twomey 0-5, L Meade 0-4, C Keane 1-0, S O'Donovan 0-3, T Twomey 0-3, E Kelly 0-3, C Dineen 0-2, J Meade 0-1.		J Coughlan 3-3, J Geary 2-1, M Ryan 1-1, C O'Brien 0-3, C Griffin 0-3, T O'Mahony 0-2.	Referee: J Larkin (Ballinora)

4 August 2019 Round 2	Carrigtwohill	1-11 - 1-09	Killeagh	Clonmult Memorial Park, Midleton
	L Gosnell 0-6, S Devlin 1-0, S Rohan 0-2, P Hogan 0-1, T Hogan 0-1, J Mulcahy 0-1.		R McCarthy 0-5, A Leahy 1-0, M Murphy 0-2, K Lane 0-2.	Referee: D Kirwan (Éire Óg)

10 August 2019 Round 2	Ballymartle	2-11 - 1-20	Midleton	Páirc Uí Rinn, Cork
	E Healy 0-7, B Corry 1-2, R Cahalane 1-0, D Dwyer 0-1, J Dwyer 0-1.		C Lehane 1-13, G Manley 0-2, S O'Sullivan 0-1, L O'Farrell 0-1, T O'Connell 0-1, A Ryan 0-1, P White 0-1.	Referee: M Maher (St. Finbarr's)

11 August 2019 Round 2	Erin's Own	1-13 - 0-19	Kanturk	Mallow GAA Complex, Mallow
	E Murphy 0-7, M O'Carroll 1-2, C Linehan 0-1, J O'Carroll 0-1, R O'Flynn 0-1, M Collins 0-1.		S Carey 0-8, R Walsh 0-3, A Nash 0-3, I Walsh 0-2, A Walsh 0-2, C Clernon 0-1.	Referee: D Copps (Ballyhea)

11 August 2019 Round 2	Ballyhea	3-20 - 4-16	Bride Rovers	Mallow GAA Complex, Mallow
	P O'Callaghan 0-10, E O'Leary 2-0, G Morrissey 1-1, C Cox 0-3, T Hanley 0-2, M O'Sullivan 0-2, B Coleman 0-1, J Morrissey 0-1.		B Johnson 3-9, C Ryan 1-1, D Dooley 0-2, P O'Flynn 0-1, S O'Connor 0-1, M Collins 0-1, B Roche 0-1.	Referee: N Wall (Carrigaline)

=== Round 3 ===
10 August 2019 Round 3	Na Piarsaigh	0-16 - 1-16	St. Finbarr's	Páirc Uí Rinn, Cork
	C Hannifin 0-5, E Sheehan 0-3, E Moynihan 0-2, D Lee 0-2, C Buckley 0-1, D Connery 0-1, P Guest 0-1, P Rourke 0-1.		E Finn 1-6, C Cahalane 0-3, D Cahalane 0-2, P Kelleher 0-1, E Keane 0-1, G O'Connor 0-1, R O'Mahony 0-1, B Hennessy 0-1.	Referee: C McAllister (Aghada)

10 August 2019 Round 3	Newtownshandrum	1-25 - 2-16	Blackrock	Mourne Abbey
	J Coughlan 0-13, T O'Mahony 1-5, J Geary 0-2, C O'Brien 0-1, C Twomey 0-1, D O'Connor 0-1, S Griffin 0-1, C Griffin 0-1.		M O'Halloran 0-6, S O'Keeffe 1-2, D Meaney 1-0, T Deasy 0-2, D O'Farrell 0-1, A Connolly 0-1, G O'Regan 0-1, S Murphy 0-1, C Cormack 0-1, J O'Sullivan 0-1.	Referee: S Stokes (Tullylease)

17 August 2019 Round 3	Charleville	1-21 - 1-22 (aet)	Glen Rovers	Mallow GAA Complex
	D Fitzgibbon 0-16, A Cagney 1-1, D Casey 0-2, J Doyle 0-1, M Kavanagh 0-1.		P Horgan 0-12, D Brosnan 1-2, S Kennefick 0-2, D Cronin 0-2, D Busteed 0-2, D Morris 0-1, D Tynan 0-1.	Referee: C McAllister (Aghada)

17 August 2019 Round 3	Carrigtwohill	2-10 - 1-11	Bandon	Ovens
	L Gosnell 0-8, B Twomey 2-1, T Hogan 0-1.		R Crowley 1-5, A Murphy 0-3, J Hickey 0-2, M Cahalane 0-1.	Referee: D Kirwan (Éire Óg)

31 August 2019 Round 3	Kanturk	0-14 - 1-14	Ballyhea	Páirc Uí Rinn, Cork
	S Carey 0-6 (0-3 f), I Walsh 0-3, A Walsh, L McLoughlin, L O'Neill, D O'Connell, M Healy 0-1 each.	Report	J Morrissey 1-2, M O'Sullivan 0-6 (0-1 sl), P O'Callaghan 0-4 (0-3 f), E O'Leary 0-2.	Referee: J Larkin (Ballinora)

31 August 2019 Round 3	Sarsfields	0-19 - 0-15	Douglas	Páirc Uí Rinn, Cork
	E O’Sullivan 0-12 (0-11 f, 0-1 65), J O’Connor 0-3, D Kearney, J Sweeney, A Myers, T Óg Murphy 0-1 each.	Report	S Kingston 0-7 (0-6 f), A Cadogan 0-3, M O’Connor 0-2, B Turnbull, M Collins, C O’Donovan 0-1 each.	Referee: D Copps (Ballyhea)

1 September 2019 Round 3	Midleton	4-16 - 0-34	Imokilly	Páirc Séamus de Barra, Carrigtwohill
	C Lehane 1-10 (1-7 f), T O’Connell 2-1, S O’Meara 1-1, L O’Farrell, C Beausang 0-2 each.	Report	D Dalton 0-15 (0-10 f), S Harnedy 0-6, B Lawton 0-5, J Cronin, A Spillane, M O’Keeffe 0-2 each, B Cooper, S O’Regan Óg 0-1 each.	Referee: C Lyons (Nemo Rangers)

1 September 2019 Round 3	Bishopstown	0-17 - 1-12	University College Cork	Ballinlough
	P Cronin 0-8 (0-5 f), T Murray 0-4, J Scally 0-2, B Murray, B O’Driscoll and C Hegarty 0-1 each.	Report	M Devine 1-2, B Verling 0-5 (0-4 f, 0-1 65), M Kehoe 0-3, B Kelleher and C Terry 0-1 each.	Referee: S Stokes (Tullylease)

=== Quarter-finals ===
15 September 2019 Quarter-final	Bishopstown	0-14 - 0-15	St. Finbarr's	Páirc Uí Rinn, Cork
	P Cronin 0-6 f, T Murray, C Hegarty 0-2 each, K O’Halloran 0-2 (0-1 f), S Lordan, M Power 0-1 each.	Report	E Finn 0-7 (0-5 f), D Cahalane, C Keane, C Cahalane 0-2 each, C Walsh, P Kelleher 0-1 each.	Referee: D Copps (Ballyhea)

15 September 2019 Quarter-final	Carrigtwohill	3-17 - 2-16	Ballyhea	Páirc Uí Rinn, Cork
	J Mulcahy (3-0), L Gosnell (0-7, 0-4 frees), S Rohan (0-5), J Horgan (0-2), B Twomey, T Hogan and J McCarthy (0-1 each).	Report	M O’Sullivan (0-9, 0-6 frees, 0-1 65), G Morrissey and P O’Callaghan (1-0 each), E O’Leary (0-5), T Hanley (0-2).	Referee: S Stokes (Tullylease)

21 September 2019 Quarter-final	Newtownshandrum	0-14 - 1-12	Glen Rovers	Páirc Uí Rinn, Cork
	J Coughlan (0-7, 0-5 frees, 0-1 65), T O’Mahony (0-3 frees), M Ryan, C O’Brien, J Twomey and J Geary (0-1 each).	Report	P Horgan (0-6, 0-4 frees, 0-1 65), D Cunningham (1-0), C Dorris (0-2), D Dooling, D Brosnan, S Kennefick and L Coughlan (0-1 each).	Referee: N Wall (Carrigaline)

21 September 2019 Quarter-final	Imokilly	1-17 - 0-10	Sarsfields	Páirc Uí Rinn, Cork
	D Dalton (1-10, 1-0 pen, 0-9 frees), W Leahy and S Harnedy (0-2 each), M O’Keeffe, S Hegarty and B Lawton (0-1 each).	Report	J O’Connor (0-3), D Kearney and J Sweeney (0-2 each), W Kearney, L Hackett, E O’Sullivan (free) (0-1 each).	Referee: C Lyons (Nemo Rangers)

=== Semi-finals ===
6 October 2019 Semi-final	Glen Rovers	0-26 - 0-11	Carrigtwohill	Páirc Uí Rinn, Cork
	P Horgan (0-8, 0-3 frees); D Cronin, C Dorris (0-4 each); S Kennefick (0-3); L Coughlan, D Brosnan (0-2 each); R Downey, B Moylan, A O’Donovan (0-1 each).	Report	L Gosnell (0-10, 0-8 frees, 0-1 ‘65); J Horgan (0-1).	Referee: C McAllister (Aghada)

6 October 2019 Semi-final	Imokilly	3-19 - 1-19	St. Finbarr's	Páirc Uí Rinn, Cork
	D Dalton 1-9 (0-6 frees, 0-1 sideline), B Lawton 0-4, S Harnedy 0-3, P O’Sullivan, S O’Regan Óg 1-0 each, W Leahy, A Spillane, B Cooper 0-1 each.	Report	C Cahalane 0-13 (0-9 frees, 0-1 65), B Hennessy 1-1, D Cahalane 0-2 (0-1 free), C Keane 0-2, J Power 0-1.

=== Final ===
20 October 2019 Final	Glen Rovers	1-16 - 2-17	Imokilly	Páirc Uí Rinn, Cork
	P Horgan 0-11 (0-8 f), D Cronin 1-0, D Brosnan 0-2, D Noonan, L Coughlan, C Dorris 0-1 each.	Report	D Dalton 1-7 (1-4 f, 0-1 65), S Harnedy 1-2, B Cooper 0-3, A Spillane, P O’Sullivan, W Leahy, S Hegarty, S O’Regan 0-1 each.	Attendance: 5,536; Referee: N Wall (Ballincollig)

== Championship statistics ==
=== Scoring ===
Top scorers overall

Rank	Player	Club	Tally	Total	Matches	Average
1	Declan Dalton	Imokilly	3-55	64	6	10.66
2	Patrick Horgan	Glen Rovers	0-46	46	5	9.20
3	Jamie Coughlan	Newtownshandrum	4-29	41	4	10.25
4	Conor Lehane	Midleton	2-34	40	3	13.33
5	Liam Gosnell	Carrigtwohill	0-37	37	5	7.40
6	Darragh Fitzgibbon	Charleville	0-30	30	2	15.00
7	Eoghan Murphy	Erin's Own	2-22	28	3	9.33
8	Barry Johnson	Bride Rovers	4-15	27	2	13.50
8	Eoghan Finn	St. Finbarr's	1-24	27	4	6.75
9	Pa Cronin	Bishopstown	1-22	25	3	8.33
9	Conor Cahalane	St. Finbarr's	1-22	25	4	6.25

Top scorers in a single game

Rank	Player	Club	Tally	Total	Opposition
1	Barry Johnson	Bride Rovers	3-09	18	Ballyhea
2	Conor Lehane	Midleton	1-13	16	Ballymartle
2	Eoghan Murphy	Erin's Own	1-13	16	Charleville
2	Darragh Fitzgibbon	Charleville	0-16	16	Glen Rovers
3	Declan Dalton	Imokilly	0-15	15	Midleton
4	Darragh Fitzgibbon	Charleville	0-14	14	Erin's Own
5	Conor Lehane	Midleton	1-10	13	Imokilly
5	Declan Dalton	Imokilly	1-10	13	Sarsfields
5	Jamie Coughlan	Newtownshandrum	0-13	13	Blackrock
5	Conor Cahalane	St. Finbarr's	0-13	13	Imokilly

=== Miscellaneous ===
- Charleville return to the senior grade for the first time since 1952.
- St. Finbarr's qualified for the semi-finals of the championship for the first time since 2009.
- On 21 September 2019, Patrick Horgan became the first player to score more than 500 points in the history of the championship.
- Imokilly became the first team since St. Finbarr's in 1982 to win three successive championships.
