= Eoghan Murphy (Erin's Own hurler) =

Irish hurler

Personal information
- Native name: Eoghan Ó Murchú (Irish)
- Nickname: The Bear
- Born: 20 July 1987 (age 39) Glounthaune, County Cork, Ireland
- Occupation: Liability investigator
- Height: 6 ft 3 in (191 cm)

Sport
- Sport: Hurling
- Position: Full-forward
Club*
| Years | Club | Apps (scores) |
| 2005-present | Erin's Own | 80 (21-544) |
Club titles
- Cork titles: 2
College
- Years: College
- 2006-2009: University College Cork
College titles
- Fitzgibbon titles: 1
Inter-county**
| Years | County | Apps (scores) |
| 2007 | Cork | 2 (0-01) |
Inter-county titles
- Munster titles: 0
- All-Irelands: 0
- NHL: 0
- All Stars: 0
- * club appearances and scores correct as of 22:00, 12 August 2025. **Inter County team apps and scores correct as of 18:39, 16 January 2019.

Eoghan Murphy (born 20 July 1987) is an Irish hurler who plays for Cork Senior Championship club Erin's Own. As of 2019, he plays as a full-forward. Murphy, along with his brother Kieran, is a former member of the Cork senior hurling team.

== Playing career ==
=== University College Cork ===
As a student at University College Cork Murphy was selected for the college's senior hurling team on a number of occasions. On 7 March 2009, he was an unused substitute when UCC defeated the University of Limerick by 2–17 to 0–14 to win the Fitzgibbon Cup.

=== Erin's Own ===
Murphy joined the Erin's Own club at a young age and played in all grades at juvenile and underage levels, winning back-to-back Cork Under-21 Championship in 2004 and 2005. He made his first appearance for the club's senior team on 8 July 2005 in a 4–17 to 2–15 defeat of Imokilly.

On 22 October 2006, Murphy scored 1-10 from left corner-forward when Erin's Own defeated Cloyne by 2–19 to 3–14 in the final of the Cork Senior Championship. His tally of 1-31 placed him as the second-highest scorer in that year's championship.

On 14 October 2007, Murphy won a second Cork Senior Championship medal after Erin's Own 1–11 to 1–07 defeat of Newrownshandrum in the final. He scored five points from frees in the game.

=== Cork ===
==== Minor and under-21 ====
Murphy was sixteen-years-old when he first played for Cork as a member of the minor team on 27 June 2004. He scored 1–01 after being introduced as a substitute in Cork's 2–12 to 3–08 defeat of Tipperary to win the Munster Championship.

On 26 June 2005, Murphy won a second Munster Championship medal after a 2–18 to 1–12 defeat of Limerick in the final.

Murphy subsequently progressed onto the Cork under-21 team. On 1 August 2008, he won a Munster Championship medal at full-forward after Cork's 1–20 to 0–10 defeat of Waterford in the final.

==== Senior ====
Murphy made his first appearance for the Cork senior hurling team on 18 February 2007 in a 1–21 to 0-14 National Hurling League defeat of Offaly. He scored from 1-01 during the game. Murphy was later included on Cork's championship panel and made his first appearance on 7 July in a 1–27 to 0–11 defeat of Offaly in the All-Ireland Qualifiers. Murphy's inter-county career ended at the end of the season.

== Career statistics ==
=== Club ===
As of 21 September 2025.

| Team | Year | Cork | | Munster | | All-Ireland | | Total | |
| Team | Year | Apps | Score | Apps | Score | Apps | Score | Apps | Score |
|---|---|---|---|---|---|---|---|---|---|
| Erin's Own | 2005 | 1 | 0-01 | — | | — | | 1 | 0-01 |
| Erin's Own | 2006 | 5 | 1-31 | 2 | 1-08 | — | | 7 | 2-39 |
| Erin's Own | 2007 | 5 | 0-29 | 1 | 0-04 | — | | 6 | 0-33 |
| Erin's Own | 2008 | 4 | 2-23 | — | | — | | 4 | 2-23 |
| Erin's Own | 2009 | 4 | 1-26 | — | | — | | 4 | 1-26 |
| Erin's Own | 2010 | 5 | 1-38 | — | | — | | 5 | 1-38 |
| Erin's Own | 2011 | 3 | 2-21 | — | | — | | 3 | 2-21 |
| Erin's Own | 2012 | 3 | 1-19 | — | | — | | 3 | 1-19 |
| Erin's Own | 2013 | 3 | 0-21 | — | | — | | 3 | 0-21 |
| Erin's Own | 2014 | 2 | 0-15 | — | | — | | 2 | 0-15 |
| Erin's Own | 2015 | 5 | 3-43 | — | | — | | 5 | 3-43 |
| Erin's Own | 2016 | 7 | 3-63 | — | | — | | 7 | 3-63 |
| Erin's Own | 2017 | 5 | 2-37 | — | | — | | 5 | 2-37 |
| Erin's Own | 2018 | 2 | 1-23 | — | | — | | 2 | 1-23 |
| Erin's Own | 2019 | 3 | 2-22 | — | | — | | 3 | 2-22 |
| Erin's Own | 2020 | 5 | 0-33 | — | | — | | 5 | 0-33 |
| Erin's Own | 2021 | 4 | 1-29 | — | | — | | 4 | 1-29 |
| Erin's Own | 2022 | 4 | 0-21 | — | | — | | 4 | 0-21 |
| Erin's Own | 2023 | 3 | 0-27 | — | | — | | 3 | 0-27 |
| Erin's Own | 2024 | 3 | 0-07 | — | | — | | 3 | 0-07 |
| Erin's Own | 2025 | 3 | 0-04 | — | | — | | 3 | 0-04 |
| Total | | 79 | 20-533 | 3 | 1-12 | — | | 82 | 21-545 |

=== Inter-county ===
| Team | Year | National League | | | Munster | | All-Ireland | | Total | |
| Team | Year | Division | Apps | Score | Apps | Score | Apps | Score | Apps | Score |
|---|---|---|---|---|---|---|---|---|---|---|
| Cork | 2007 | Division 1A | 5 | 2-01 | — | | 2 | 0-01 | 7 | 2-02 |
| Total | | | 5 | 2-01 | — | | 2 | 0-01 | 7 | 2-02 |

== Honours ==
University College Cork

- Fitzgibbon Cup (1): 2009

Erin's Own

- Cork Senior Hurling Championship (2): 2006, 2007

Cork

- Munster Under-21 Hurling Championship (1): 2007
- Munster Minor Hurling Championship (2): 2004, 2005
