= 2017 Cork Senior Hurling Championship =

Annual hurling competition season

- Dates: 6 May – 22 October 2017
- Teams: 26
- Sponsor: Evening Echo
- Champions: Imokilly (3rd title); Séamus Harnedy (captain); Fergal Condon (manager)
- Runners-up: Blackrock; Stephen Murphy (captain); Fergal Ryan (manager)
- Relegated: Youghal

Tournament statistics
- Matches played: 53
- Goals scored: 152 (2.87 per match)
- Points scored: 1750 (33.02 per match)
- Top scorer(s): Ronan Crowley (2-54)

The 2017 Cork Senior Hurling Championship was the 129th staging of the Cork Senior Hurling Championship since its establishment by the Cork County Board in 1887. The draw for the 2017 fixtures took place on 11 December 2016. The championship ran from 6 May to 22 October 2017.

Glen Rovers entered the championship as the defending champions, however, they were defeated by Na Piarsaigh in Round 4. Youghal's relegation ended five years of top tier hurling for the club.

The final was played on 22 October 2017 at Páirc Uí Chaoimh in Cork, between Imokilly and Blackrock, in what was their third meeting in the final overall and a first meeting in 16 years. Imokilly won the match by 3–13 to 0–18 to claim their third championship title overall and a first title in 19 years. This was their third championship title and their first in 19 championship seasons.

Bandon's Ronan Crowley was the championship's top scorer with 2-54.

== Team changes ==
=== To Championship ===
Promoted from the Cork Premier Intermediate Hurling Championship

- Bandon

== Results ==
=== Preliminary round ===
6 May 2017 Preliminary round	Glen Rovers	2-30 - 2-14	Bride Rovers	Páirc Uí Rinn
20:00	P Horgan 0-10, C Dorris 0-8, M Dooley 1-3, D Brosnan 0-5, D Busteed 1-0, G Callanan 0-1, D Cronin 0-1, D Noonan 0-1, R Downey 0-1.		B Johnson 0-7, M Collins 1-1, S Walsh 1-1, D Dooley 0-3, DJ Cahill 0-1, S Hackett 0-1.	Referee: J Larkin (Douglas)

7 May 2017 Preliminary round	Bandon	3-18 - 4-13	Muskerry	Brinny Sportsfield
15:30	R Crowley 1-10, D Crowley 1-2, M Cahalane 1-2, A Murphy 0-3, J Hickey 0-1.		S Bourke 2-5, K Hallissey 1-3, D Bowen 1-1, D O'Connell 0-2, J Corkery 0-2.	Referee: B Murphy (Carrigtwohill)

=== Round 1 ===
6 May 2017 Round 1	Ballymartle	1-17 - 0-11	St. Finbarr's	Páirc Uí Rinn
18:15	Darren McCarthy 1-3, B Corry 0-5, R Cahalane 0-3, B Dwyer 0-3, S O'Mahony 0-1, J Dwyer 0-1, K McCarthy 0-1.		B Beckett 0-5, S Callinan 0-1, D Cahalane 0-1, E Maher 0-1, E Finn 0-1, B Hennessy 0-1, C Keane 0-1.	Referee: D Copps (Ballyhea)

6 May 2017 Round 1	Bishopstown	0-12 - 2-26	Imokilly	Riverstown Sportsfield
18:45	P Cronin 0-5, T Murray 0-3, B Murray 0-3, D Lester 0-1.		W Leahy 0-11, P O'Sullivan 1-3, S Harnedy 0-4, B Dunne 0-4, I Cahill 1-0, M O'Keeffe 0-2, B Lawton 0-1, J Beausang 0-1.	Referee: N Wall (Carrigaline)

7 May 2017 Round 1	Avondhu	0-17 - 2-23	Carbery	Coachford Sportsfield
14:15	A Cagney 0-3, K Morrison 0-3, S Coleman 0-3, K Curtin 0-2, C O'Sullivan 0-2, C Buckley 0-1, D Buckley 0-1, W Condon 0-1, D Curtin 0-1.		J McCarthy 0-10, D O'Donovan 2-1, G O'Donovan 0-4, M Keohane 0-2, C McCarthy 0-2, C O'Donovan 0-2, P Crowley 0-1, S O'Shea 0-1.	Referee: P O'Driscoll (Bride Rovers)

7 May 2017 Round 1	Duhallow	0-22 - 2-10	Youghal	Páirc Mac Gearailt
15:30	S Howard 0-6, E Sheahan 0-3, K Tarrant 0-3, J Murphy 0-2, S Hehir 0-2, L McLoughlin 0-2, M Ellis 0-2, K Cremin 0-1, S O'Reilly 0-1.		Brendan Ring 1-1, S Smiddy 1-0, D O'Connell 0-3, A Joyce 0-3, B Cooper 0-2, A Frahill-O'Connor 0-1.	Referee: C Lyons (Nemo Rangers)

7 May 2017 Round 1	Ballyhea	3-14 - 1-20 (aet)	Newcestown	Coachford Sportsfield
16:00	P O'Callaghan 1-6, S O'Kelly 2-0, T Hanley 0-3, E O'Leary 0-2, L O'Connor 0-1, M O'Sullivan 0-1, J Morrissey 0-1.		E Kelly 0-6, L Meade 0-6, C Keane 1-0, D Twomey 0-2, S Ryan 0-2, T Twomey 0-1, J Meade 0-1, T Horgan 0-1, C Dineen 0-1.	Referee: M Maher (St. Finbarr's)

7 May 2017 Round 1	Cork Institute of Technology	0-22 - 0-20	Douglas	Páirc Uí Rinn
16:30	M Kearney 0-7, T O'Connor 0-4, J O'Neill 0-2, K Cashman 0-2, D Buckley 0-2, J Looney 0-2, J Good 0-1, C Hammersley 0-1, P Collins 0-1.		C McCarthy 0-8, M Harrington 0-3, A Cadogan 0-3, S Kingston 0-2, M Collins 0-2, M O'Connor 0-1, D Murphy 0-1.	Referee: G Scully (Killeagh-St. Ita's)

7 May 2017 Round 1	University College Cork	4-22 - 0-12	Carrigdhoun	Páirc Uí Rinn
16:30	R O'Shea 0-11, T Devine 2-0, D Fitzgibbon 0-6, B McCarthy 1-2, C Roche 1-0, S Hayes 0-1, D Holmes 0-1, M Mahony 0-1.		G White 0-3, F O'Leary 0-3, B Collins 0-2, W O'Brien 0-2, K Kavanagh 0-1, C Tyers 0-1.	Referee: C McAllister (Aghada)

26 May 2017 Round 1	Blackrock	2-14 - 1-15 (aet)	Bandon	Páirc Uí Rinn
19:30	A O'Callaghan 0-4, J Cashman 1-0, S O'Keeffe 1-0, D Cashman 0-3, J O'Sullivan 0-3, M O'Halloran 0-2, D O'Farrell 0-1, D Meaney 0-1.		R Crowley 0-10, D Crowley 1-3, A Murphy 0-1, M Cahalane 0-1.	Referee: J Larkin (Douglas)

28 May 2017 Round 1	Carrigtwohill	0-9 - 2-14	Midleton	Páirc Uí Rinn
14:15	D O'Driscoll 0-3, S Rohan 0-2, L Gosnell 0-2, B McCarthy 0-1, T Hogan 0-1.		C Lehane 0-8, L O'Farrell 2-0, P Haughney 0-2, C Walsh 0-1, A Ryan 0-1, P Nagle 0-1, P White 0-1.	Referee: D Kirwan (Éire Óg)

28 May 2017 Round 1 replay	Ballyhea	0-12 - 1-15	Newcestown	Coachford Sportsfield
15:30	P O'Callaghan 0-6, E O'Leary 0-3, J Morrissey 0-2, G Morrissey 0-1.	Report	D Twomey 0-9, L Meade 1-1, C Keane 0-3, S Ryan 0-1, J Meade 0-1.	Referee: C Lyons (Nemo Rangers)

28 May 2017 Round 1	Na Piarsaigh	1-20 - 1-18	Newtownshandrum	Mallow GAA Complex
15:30	P Guest 0-6, D Lee 0-4, S Forde 1-0, E Moynihan 0-3, C Joyce 0-2, P Gould 0-2, G Joyce 0-1, C Buckley 0-1, A Hogan 0-1.		R Clifford 0-12, J Coughlan 1-2, S Young 0-2, S Griffin 0-1, M Ryan 0-1.	Referee: S Stokes (Tullylease)

28 May 2017 Round 1	Glen Rovers	1-11 - 1-16	Sarsfields	Páirc Uí Rinn
16:00	P Horgan 1-6, C Dorris 0-2, G Callanan 0-1, D Noonan 0-1, M Dooley 0-1.		J O'Connor 1-1, E O'Sullivan 0-4, C Duggan 0-3, A Myers 0-3, E Quigley 0-2, T Óg Murphy 0-2, D Kearney 0-1.	Referee: J Larkin (Ballinora)

28 May 2017 Round 1	Killeagh	1-10 - 1-14	Erin's Own	Clonmult Memorial Park
19:30	E Keniry 0-5, A Walsh 1-1, J O'Connor 0-2, K Murphy 0-1, S Smiddy 0-1.		E Murphy 0-5, R O'Flynn 0-5, J O'Flynn 1-0, K Murphy 0-2, A Power 0-1, M O'Carroll 0-1.	Referee: M Maher (St. Finbarr's)

=== Round 2A ===
4 June 2017 Round 2A	Duhallow	2-13 - 3-22	Sarsfields	Coachford Sportsfield
15:00	J Murphy 0-5 (0-3f, 1 '65), E Sheehan 1-1, K Tarrant 1-0, L McLoughlin (0-1f) and S O'Reilly 0-3 each, M O'Sullivan 0-1.		A Myers 3-3, E O'Sullivan 0-5 (0-3f), E Quigley, D Kearney, C Duggan 0-3 each, D Roche 0-2, P Leopold, C Smith, J O'Connor 0-1 each	Referee: D Kirwan (Éire Óg)

4 June 2017 Round 2A	Imokilly	1-26 - 3-10	University College Cork	Riverstown Sportsfield
19:30	S Harnedy 1-4, W Leahy 0-7 (0-4f), B Dunne 0-5 (0-1f), M O'Keeffe and B Lawton 0-3 each, J Cashman 0-2, J Cronin and P O'Sullivan 0-1 each		A Casey 2-1, R O'Shea 1-1 (0-1f), D Fitzgibbon 0-4, D Holmes 0-2, S Hegarty and A Spillane 0-1 each	Referee: C Lyons (Nemo Rangers)

23 June 2017 Round 2A	Blackrock	1-21 - 1-17	Ballymartle	Páirc Uí Rinn
19:30	A O'Callaghan 1-9, S O'Keeffe 0-4, G Regan 0-4, M O'Halloran 0-3, J O'Sillivan 0-1.		B Dwyer 0-6, D O'Leary 1-0, Darren McCarthy 0-3, B Corry 0-3, J Dwyer 0-2, K McCarthy 0-1, G Webb 0-1.	Referee: S Stokes (Tullylease)

24 June 2017 Round 2A	Carbery	0-9 - 1-29	Na Piarsaigh	Cloughduv Grounds
19:45	MP Keohane 0-7, J Ryan 0-1, G O'Donovan 0-1.		P Guest 1-7, D Lee 0-6, P Gould 0-4, D Gunning 0-2, K Forde 0-2, C Buckley 0-2, G Joyce 0-2, E Moynihan 0-1, A Brady 0-1, A Hogan 0-1, K Buckley 0-1.

25 June 2017 Round 2A	Midleton	2-25 - 4-15 (aet)	Erin's Own	Páirc Séamus de Barra
15:30	P Nagle 2-2, L O'Farrell 0-6, J Nagle 0-6, P Haughney 0-4, C Beausang 0-3, A Ryan 0-1, P White 0-1, P O'Shea 0-1, S O'Leary-Hayes 0-1.		E Murphy 0-8, A Bowen 1-2, R O'Flynn 1-2, J O'Flynn 1-1, M O'Carroll 1-0, S Horgan 0-1, M Collins 0-1.	Referee: C Lyons (Nemo Rangers)

25 June 2017 Round 2A	Cork Institute of Technology	1-14 - 2-17	Newcestown	Brinny Sportsfield
19:00	L O'Keeffe 1-5, C Hammersley 0-3, R Hanley 0-2, T O'Connor 0-2, E Heffernan 0-1, K Duggan 0-1.		L Meade 0-6, D Twomey 0-5, T Twomey 1-1, J Kelleher 1-1, S Ryan 0-2, J Meade 0-1, C Keane 0-1.	Referee: N Wall (Carrigaline)

=== Round 2B ===
24 June 2017 Round 2B	Newtownshandrum	1-18 - 1-13	Youghal	Moore Park
19:30	D Stack 1-2, R Clifford 0-5, J Coughlan 0-3, M Ryan 0-3, T O'Mahony 0-2, M Thompson 0-1, S Griffin 0-1, J Geary 0-1.		B Moloney 1-4, D Ring 0-2, A Joyce 0-2, C O'Mahony 0-2, Barry Ring 0-1, J O'Mahony 0-1, Brendan Ring 0-1.	Referee: M Maher (St. Finbarr's)

24 June 2017 Round 2B	Bride Rovers	1-19 - 0-19	Avondhu	Castletownroche Grounds
19:30	D Dooley 1-4, B Johnson 0-4, R Whitty 0-3, M Collins 0-2, C O'Connor 0-2, S Glasgow 0-1, R Prendergast 0-1, S Walsh 0-1, D Fitzgerald 0-1.		L Coleman 0-9, J Barry 0-3, N McNamara 0-1, C Buckley 0-1, D O'Flynn 0-1, K Morrison 0-1, D Casey 0-1, S Condon 0-1, D O'Reilly 0-1.	Referee: B Coniry (Crosshaven)

24 June 2017 Round 2B	Bandon	2-18 - 0-14	Carrigtwohill	Éire Óg Grounds
19:30	R Crowley 0-7, M Cahalane 1-3, D Crowley 1-0, J Hickey 0-3, A Murphy 0-2, M Sugrue 0-2, C Dullea 0-1.		T Hogan 0-5, L Gosnell 0-5, D O'Driscoll 0-2, S Rohan 0-1, D Crotty 0-1.	Referee: D Kirwan (Éire Óg)

24 June 2017 Round 2B	Glen Rovers	1-22 - 4-11	St. Finbarr's	Páirc Uí Rinn
20:00	P Horgan 0-11, D Brosnan 0-5, D Cunningham 1-0, M Dooley 0-3, C Dorris 0-3.		I Lordan 1-7, P Kelleher 1-1, C Cahalane 1-0, B Hennessy 1-0, R O'Mahony 0-2, G O'Connor 0-1.	Referee: J Larkin (Douglas)

26 June 2017 Round 2B	Carrigdhoun	2-14 - 4-19	Muskerry	Páirc Liam Mhic Cárthaigh
19:30	D Drake 1-9, D O'Donovan 1-0, S Coleman 0-2, G White 0-1, R Lombard 0-1, K Tyers 0-1.		S Bourke 1-6, D O'Connell 2-1, K Hallissey 1-4, D Bowen 0-3, S Lohan 0-2, P Philpott 0-1, M Verling 0-1, J Cooper 0-1.	Referee: D Copps (Ballyhea)

7 August 2017 Round 2B	Ballyhea	2-22 - 3-21 (aet)	Bishopstown	Mallow GAA Complex
19:30	P O'Callaghan 0-13, E O'Leary 2-4, J McCarthy 0-2, J Morrissey 0-1, T Hanley 0-1, G Morrissey 0-1.		T Murray 1-7, P Cronin 0-9, M Power 1-2, B Murray 1-1, T Creed 0-2.	Referee: S Stokes (Tullylease)

19 August 2017 Round 2B	Douglas	0-21 - 2-16	Killeagh	Páirc Uí Chonaill
19:15	C McCarthy (0-6, 0-3 frees, 0-1 65m, 0-1 sl), B Turnbull, A Cadogan and M Collins (0-4 each), S Bourke (0-2), S Powter (0-1).	Report	E Keniry (1-7, 0-4 frees), D Walsh (1-1), G Leahy (0-4), B Barry, K Lane, K Murphy (free) and A Walsh (0-1 each).	Referee: N Wall (Carrigaline)

=== Round 3 ===
16 July 2017 Round 3	Duhallow	1-20 - 1-18	Bride Rovers	Páirc Uí Rinn
15:00	J Murphy 1-2, S Howard 0-5, S O'Reilly 0-3, A Nash 0-2, L McLoughlin 0-2, M Vaughan 0-2, S Crowley 0-1, E Sheahan 0-1, M Ellis 0-1, W Murphy 0-1.		B Johnson 0-10, M Collins 1-2, D Dooley 0-4, C O'Connor 0-2.	Referee: M Maher (St. Finbarr's)

16 July 2017 Round 3	Erin's Own	w/o - scr.	Muskerry

18 July 2017 Round 3	Cork Institute of Technology	1-18 - 0-21	Glen Rovers	Páirc Uí Rinn
19:30	R Grey 1-6, P Collins 0-3, M Bradley 0-2, M Ryan 0-2, T O'Connor 0-2, A Coffey 0-1, E O'Shea 0-1, J Looney 0-1.		P Horgan 0-8, D Brosnan 0-5, C Dorris 0-4, D Noonan 0-2, G Callinan 0-1, M Dooley 0-1.	Referee: C McAllister (Aghada)

29 July 2017 Round 3	Bandon	1-19 - 3-11	Newtownshandrum	Páirc Uí Rinn
19:00	R Crowley 0-10, M Sugrue 1-2, M Cahalane 0-3, J Hickey 0-2, A Murphy 0-1, J Walsh 0-1.		R Clifford 1-2, J Geary 1-1, J Coughlan 0-4, D Stack 1-0, C Twomey 0-1, S Young 0-1, M Thompson 0-1, J Bowles 0-1.	Referee: C Lyons (Nemo Rangers)

12 August 2017 Round 3	Ballymartle	1-11 - 0-14 (aet)	Bishopstown	Páirc Uí Rinn
19:00	K McCarthy 1-2, S O'Mahony 0-4, Darren McCarthy 0-2, C Allen 0-1, B Corry 0-1, P Dwyer 0-1.		T Murray 0-12, C O'Driscoll 0-1, E McCarthy 0-1.	Referee: D Copps (Ballyhea)

22 August 2017 Round 3 replay	Ballymartle	0-16 - 0-11	Bishopstown	Páirc Uí Rinn
19:30	Darren McCarthy (0-6 frees), B Corry, P Dwyer and J Dwyer (0-2 each), E O’Leary, S O’Mahony, R Cahalane and D O’Leary (0-1 each).	Report	T Murray (0-6, 0-5 frees, 0-1 65m), B Murray (0-3), P Cronin (0-2).	Referee: C McAllister (Aghada)

27 August 2017 Round 3	Carbery	1-15 - 3-23	Killeagh	Páirc Uí Rinn
17:30	M Buckley 0-5, P Butler 1-0, J Sheahan 0-2, J McCarthy 0-2, S Crowley 0-1, M Crowley 0-1, E Scannell 0-1, M Heavin 0-1, F Butler 0-1, C McCarthy 0-1.		D Cahill 2-5, E Keniry 1-5, S Smiddy 0-6, A Walsh 0-3, M Fitzgerald 0-2, K Lane 0-1, K Treacy 0-1.	Referee: J Larkin (Douglas)

27 August 2017 Round 3 replay	Cork Institute of Technology	1-9 - 3-24	Glen Rovers	Páirc Uí Rinn
19:15	L O'Keeffe 1-0, J O'Neill 0-3, J O'Dwyer 0-2, E O'Shea 0-2, M Ryan 0-1, J Looney 0-1.		M Dooley 2-2, C Dorris 1-5, P Horgan 0-8, D Brosnan 0-2, D Noonan 0-2, E O'Connell 0-2, D Busteed 0-1, A O'Donovan 0-1, L Coughlan 0-1.	Referee: D Kirwan (Éire Óg)

=== Round 4 ===
8 September 2017 Round 4	Sarsfields	1-15 - 1-11	Killeagh	Páirc Uí Rinn
20:00	J O'Connor 0-6, E Quigley 1-1, L Healy 0-3, A Myers 0-2, G Grey 0-1, D Kearney 0-1, T Óg Murphy 0-1.		E Keniry 1-7, D Walsh 0-2, G Leahy 0-1, D Cahill 0-1.	Referee: D Kirwan (Éire Óg)

9 September 2017 Round 4	Bandon	2-22 - 1-15	Ballymartle	Páirc Uí Rinn
18:00	R Crowley 0-11, M Sugrue 1-3, A Murphy 1-2, M Cahalane 0-3, J Hickey 0-2, D Crowley 0-1.		Darren McCarthy 1-5, J Dwyer 0-4, B Corry 0-2, S O'Mahony 0-1, R Cahalane 0-1, D O'Leary 0-1, B Dwyer 0-1.	Referee: C Lyons (Nemo Rangers)

9 September 2017 Round 4	Glen Rovers	0-14 - 1-12	Na Piarsaigh	Páirc Uí Rinn
19:45	P Horgan 0-8, C Dorris 0-2, B Moylan 0-1, G Callanan 0-1, D Noonan 0-1, M Dooley 0-1.		P Guest 0-7, S Forde 1-0, D Lee 0-2, A Hogan 0-1, P Gould 0-1, C Buckley 0-1.	Referee: N Wall (Carrigaline)

10 September 2017 Round 4	Erin's Own	1-16 - 1-9	Duhallow	Mallow GAA Complex
18:30	E Murphy 1-7, C O'Mahony 0-2, M O'Carroll 0-2, K Murphy 0-1, S Cronin 0-1, S Murphy 0-1, R O'Flynn 0-1, S Kelly 0-1.		M Howard 0-6, S Crowley 1-0, M Ellis 0-1, A Nash 0-1, J Forrest 0-1.	Referee: D Copps (Ballyhea)

17 September 2017 Round 4	University College Cork	1-22 - 1-20	Midleton	Páirc Uí Rinn
18:30	R O'Shea 0-6, T Devine 1-1, J Barron 0-4, D Fitzgibbon 0-3, M Coleman 0-2, A Spillane 0-2, A Casey 0-1, M O'Brien 0-1, C Spillane 0-1, M Breen 0-1.		C lehane 0-8, C Walsh 0-4, P O'Shea 1-0, L O'Farrell 0-3, P Haughney 0-3, A Ryan 0-1, P Nagle 0-1.	Referee: J Larkin (Ballinora)

=== Relegation play-offs ===
30 September 2017 Round 1	Douglas	1-17 - 1-16	Youghal	Clonmult Memorial Park
15:30	A Cadogan 1-3, M O'Connor 0-6, S Kingston 0-3, S Bourke 0-2, J Moylan 0-1, S Powter 0-1, E Cadogan 0-1.		A Joyce 0-5, B Ring 1-0, B Moloney 0-3, D Ring 0-3, A Frahill-O'Connor 0-2, C O'Mahony 0-1, J O'Mahony 0-1, B Cooper 0-1.	Referee: C McAllister (Aghada)

1 October 2017 Round 2	Ballyhea	3-12 - 2-17	Carrigtwohill	Mill Field
15:00	T Hanley 2-2, J Morrissey 1-3, P O'Callaghan 0-3, S O'Kelly 0-1, G Morrissey 0-1, L O'Connor 0-1, T Shanahan 0-1.		L Gosnell 0-8, S Dempsey 1-2, D O'Driscoll 1-2, T Hogan 0-2, S Rohan 0-1, L O'Sullivan 0-1, B Twomey 0-1.	Referee: J Larkin (Ballinora)

11 November 2017 Round 2	St. Finbarr's	1-14 - 2-10	Youghal

=== Quarter-finals ===
23 September 2017 Quarter-final	Newcestown	1-11 - 1-13	Blackrock	Páirc Uí Rinn
17:30	D Twomey 0-8, J Meade 1-1, S Ryan 0-2.		A O'Callaghan 0-6, M O'Halloran 1-2, S O'Keeffe 0-2, S Murphy 0-1, J O'Sullivan 0-1, C Cormack 0-1.	Referee: N Wall (Carrigaline)

23 September 2017 Quarter-final	Na Piarsaigh	3-16 - 1-10	Bandon	Páirc Uí Rinn
19:15	P Guest 2-5, S Forde 1-0, D Lee 0-3, P Gould 0-2, E Sheehan 0-2, K Buckley 0-2, E Moynihan 0-1, A Hogan 0-1.		R Crowley 1-6, J Hickey 0-2, M Cahalane 0-1, D Crowley 0-1.	Referee: C McAllister (Aghada)

24 September 2017 Quarter-final	Erin's Own	3-16 - 2-19	Imokilly	Páirc Uí Rinn
14:00	E Murphy 1-8, M O'Carroll 1-2, R O'Flynn 1-1, C O'Callaghan 0-2, M Collins 0-1, A Bowen 0-1, P Fitzgerald 0-1.		D Dalton 1-4, W Leahy 0-4, S Harnedy 0-4, B Mulcahy 1-0, B Lawton 0-3, N O'Leary 0-1, J Cronin 0-1, M O'Keeffe 0-1, P O'Sullivan 0-1.	Referee: J Larkin (Ballinora)

24 September 2017 Quarter-final	University College Cork	0-18 - 1-15	Sarsfields	Páirc Uí Rinn
15:45	R O'Shea 0-7, M Breen 0-2, J Barron 0-2, D Fitzgibbon 0-2, M Coleman 0-2, M O'Brien 0-1, A Spillane 0-1, E CLifford 0-1.		J O'Connor 1-1, A Myers 0-4, L Healy 0-2, T Óg Murphy 0-2, E O'Sullivan 0-2, C Smith 0-1, R Ryan 0-1, E Quigley 0-1, T Óg Murphy 0-1.	Referee: D Copps (Ballyhea)

30 September 2017 Quarter-final replay	Erins' Own	4-12 - 1-22	Imokilly	Páirc Uí Rinn
17:30	E Murphy 0-9, S Horgan 2-1, M O'Carroll 2-1, R O'Flynn 0-1.		P O'Sullivan 0-6, C Fleming 0-5, W Leahy 0-4, I Cahill 1-0, J Cronin 0-2, S Harnedy 0-2, N O'Leary 0-1, B Lawton 0-1, M O'Keeffe 0-1.	Referee: D Kirwan (Éire Óg)

30 September 2017 Quarter-final replay	University College Cork	1-14 - 0-18	Sarsfields	Páirc Uí Rinn
19:15	T Devine 1-1, R O'Shea 0-2, E Clifford 0-2, S Hegarty 0-2, M Coleman 0-1, M Breen 0-1, C O'Leary 0-1, G Linehan 0-1, D Fitzgibbon 0-1, S Hayes 0-1, M O'Brien 0-1.		D Kearney 0-5, E O'Sullivan 0-4, E Quigley 0-3, T Óg Murphy 0-3, J O'Connor 0-2, D Roche 0-1.	Referee: C Lyons (Nemo Rangers)

=== Semi-finals ===
8 October 2017 Semi-final	Blackrock	0-21 - 2-14	Na Piarsaigh	Páirc Uí Chaoimh
14:15	Michael O'Halloran 0-8 (0-6f), Ger Regan and Shane O'Keeffe 0-3 each, Alan O'Callaghan 0-2, Niall Cashman, Stephen Murphy, David O'Farrell, David Cashman, Liam O'Sullivan 0-1 each	Report	Evan Sheehan 2-1, Paraig Guest 0-5 (0-4f), Keith Buckley 0-4 (0-1f), Eoin Moynihan 0-2 (0-1f, 1 '65), Christopher Joyce and Shane Forde 0-1 each	Referee: J Larkin (Ballinora)

8 October 2017 Semi-final	Imokilly	1-24 - 2-21	Sarsfields	Páirc Uí Chaoimh
16:00	Cian Fleming 1-5, William Leahy 0-6 (0-5f), Declan Dalton 0-3 (0-2f, 1 '65), Paudie O'Sullivan, Seamus Harnedy, Ian Cahill, Brian Mulcahy 0-2 each, Brian Lawton and Josh Beausang 0-1 each	Report	Jack O'Connor and Tadhg Óg Murphy 1-2 each, Daniel Kearney and Eoin O'Sullivan (0-1f) 0-3 each, William Kearney, Eoin Quigley, Cormac Duggan, Aaron Myers (0-2f) 0-2 each, Eoghan Murphy, Liam Healy, Luke Hackett 0-1 each	Referee: N Wall (Carrigaline)

14 October 2017 Semi-final replay	Imokilly	4-17 - 4-10	Sarsfields	Páirc Uí Rinn
19:00	Paudie O’Sullivan and Seamus Harnedy 2-3 each, Brian Lawton and William Leahy (0-2f) 0-3, Declan Dalton (1 '65), John Cronin, Mark O'Keeffe, Ger Millerick, Daniel Mangan 0-1 each	Report	Aaron Myers 0-4f, Alan Kennedy, Eoin O'Sullivan, Liam Healy, Colm Barry (o.g.) 1-0 each, Jack O'Connor and Tadhg Óg Murphy 0-2 each, Daniel Roche and Gavin O'Loughlin, 0-1 each.	Referee: D Kirwan (Éire Óg)

=== Final ===
22 October 2017 Final	Imokilly	3-13 - 0-18	Blackrock	Páirc Uí Chaoimh
4:00 pm	Seamus Harnedy 1-1, William Leahy 0-4f, Cian Fleming and Brian Mulcahy 1-0, Mark O'Keeffe, Brian Lawton (1 sl), Paudie O'Sullivan 0-2 each, John Cronin and Ger Millerick 0-1 each	Report	Michael O'Halloran 0-8 (0-6f), Alan O'Callaghan 0-3 (0-2f), Ciaran Cormack 0-2, David O'Farrell, Shane O'Keeffe, Ger Regan, Daniel Meaney, Tadgh Deasy 0-1 each	Attendance: 16,226; Referee: C Lyons (Nemo Rangers); Man of the Match: Ger Millerick

== Championship statistics ==
=== Top scorers ===
Overall

Rank	Player	Club	Tally	Total	Matches	Average
1	Ronan Crowley	Bandon	2-54	60	6	10.00
2	Patrick Horgan	Glen Rovers	1-51	54	6	9.00
3	Eoghan Murphy	Erin's Own	2-37	43	5	8.60
4	Pádraig Guest	Na Piarsaigh	3-30	39	5	7.80
4	William Leahy	Imokilly	0-39	39	7	5.57
6	Eoghan Keniry	Killeagh	3-24	33	4	8.25
7	Séamus Harnedy	Imokilly	4-20	32	7	4.57
8	Thomas Murray	Bishopstown	1-28	31	4	7.75
8	Pa O'Callaghan	Ballyhea	1-28	31	4	7.75
10	Rob O'Shea	UCC	1-27	30	4	7.50

Single game

Rank	Player	Club	Tally	Total	Opposition
1	Ronan Crowley	Bandon	1-10	13	Muskerry
1	Pa O'Callaghan	Ballyhea	0-13	13	Bishopstown
3	Aaron Myers	Sarsfields	3-03	12	Duhallow
3	Alan O'Callaghan	Blackrock	1-09	12	Ballymartle
3	David Drake	Carrigdhoun	1-09	12	Muskerry
3	Ryan Clifford	Newtownshandrum	0-12	12	Na Piarsaigh
3	Thomas Murray	Bishopstown	0-12	12	Ballymartle
8	Seán Bourke	Muskerry	2-05	11	Bandon
8	Pádraig Guest	Na Piarsaigh	2-05	11	Bandon
8	David Cahill	Killeagh	2-05	11	Carbery
8	Eoghan Murphy	Erin's Own	1-08	11	Imokilly
8	Ronan Crowley	Bandon	0-11	11	Ballymartle
8	Will Leahy	Imokilly	0-11	11	Bishopstown
8	Patrick Horgan	Glen Rovers	0-11	11	St. Finbarr's
8	Rob O'Shea	UCC	0-11	11	Carrigdhoun

=== Miscellaneous ===
- The semi-final between Blackrock and Na Piarsaigh was the first senior championship match to be played at the newly refurbished Páirc Uí Chaoimh. It was the first senior match played at the venue since 2014.
- Imokilly qualified for the final for the first time since 2001.
- Imokilly win the title for the first time since 1998.
- Blackrock qualified for the final for the first time since 2003.
- Youghal became the first team to be relegated from the championship since Courcey Rovers in 2014.
