= 1984 Cork Intermediate Hurling Championship =

Irish hurling competition

- Dates: 12 May 1984 – 19 August 1984
- Teams: 18
- Champions: Erin's Own (1st title); Tom Aherne (captain)
- Runners-up: Cloughduv; Teddy Dunne (captain)

Tournament statistics
- Matches played: 17
- Goals scored: 63 (3.71 per match)
- Points scored: 318 (18.71 per match)
- Top scorer(s): Dave Relihan (2-15)

The 1984 Cork Intermediate Hurling Championship was the 75th staging of the Cork Intermediate Hurling Championship since its establishment by the Cork County Board in 1909. The draw for the opening round fixtures took place on 29 January 1984. The championship began on 12 May 1984 and ended on 19 August 1984.

On 19 August 1984, Erin's Own won the championship following a 0-15 to 1-05 defeat of Cloughduv in the final at Páirc Uí Chaoimh. This as their first championship title.

Castletownroche's Dave Relihan was the championship's top scorer with 2-15.

== Team changes ==
=== From Championship ===
Regraded to the City Junior A Hurling Championship

- Glen Rovers

=== To Championship ===
Promoted from the Cork Junior A Hurling Championship

- St. Catherine's

== Results ==
=== First round ===
13 May 1984 First round	St. Finbarr's	0-14 - 3-01	Inniscarra	Ballinora
	B Searls 0-4, S Murphy 0-3, K Keating 0-3, M Kennedy 0-2, M O'Regan 0-1, T Leahy 0-1.		J Feeney 1-0, M O'Donoghue 1-0, J O'Riordan 1-0, P O'Connell 0-1.

13 May 1984 First round	Mayfield	1-01 - 2-14	Blackrock	Ballinlough
	P O'Sullivan 1-0, J Nodwell 0-1.		F Delaney 1-6, M Lyons 1-0, P Hayes 0-3, P Kavanagh 0-1, T Ahern 0-1, J Evans 0-1, M Kilcoyne 0-1, P O'Neill 0-1.

=== Second round ===
12 May 1984 Second round	Bishopstown	2-11 - 1-04	St. Vincent's	Mayfield
	G McCarthy 1-6, E Murphy 1-2, C Coffey 0-1, F O'Regan 0-1, J Crowley 0-1.		D Linehan 1-0, P McNamara 0-1, W Walsh 0-1, J Wallace 0-1, W Nagle 0-1.

13 May 1984 Second round	Newcestown	4-06 - 2-09	Passage	Páirc Liam Mhic Cárthaigh
	E Kenneally 1-2, T Crowley 1-2, E Desmond 1-0, N Collins 1-0, S O'Neill 0-1, K Kehilly 0-1.		T Lester 1-0, G O'Sullivan 1-0, T O'Neill 0-3, B Meade 0-3, J Harding 0-1, J O'Neill 0-1, K Keane 0-1.

13 May 1984 Second round	Tracton	2-07 - 5-11	Castletownroche	Church Road
	K Kingston 1-3, F Canty 1-2, B Long 0-1, P Harrington 0-1.		Dan Relihan 2-3, M Magnier 2-1, D Mellerick 1-0, Dave Relihan 0-3, W Walsh 0-2, J Power 0-1, W Magnier 0-1.

13 May 1984 Second round	Ballinhassig	1-10 - 2-13	Erin's Own	Páirc Uí Chaoimh
	J Reynolds 0-4, P Desmond 1-0, D McCarthy 0-2, S McCarthy 0-2, O Jordan 0-1, B Coleman 0-1.		PJ Murphy 1-3, Bernard Murphy 1-2, R O'Connor 0-4, K Horgan 0-2, J Bowen 0-1, M Bowen 0-1, F Horgan 0-1.

13 May 1984 Second round	Cloughduv	2-13 - 0-06	Carrigtwohill	Páirc Uí Chaoimh
	J Dunlea 1-3, M Ring 0-4, J O'Driscoll 1-0, D O'Leary 0-3, P Lucey 0-2, T O'Riordan 0-1.		J Horgan 0-5, D Barry 0-1.

13 May 1984 Second round	St. Catherine's	1-13 - 2-11	Mallow	Moore Park
	C Clancy 0-8, P Clancy 1-2, M Mellerick 0-1, D Walsh 0-1, D O'Neill 0-1.		P Shine 1-2, S Browne 1-0, E Carey 0-3, P Buckley 0-2, D Murphy 0-1, J Daly 0-1, J Buckley 0-1, Paul Redmond 0-1.

13 May 1984 Second round	Bandon	2-12 - 1-09	Éire Óg	Páirc Naomh Eoin
	P Crowley 2-6, P O'Donovan 0-3, J Murphy 0-2, R Wilmot 0-1.		D Desmond 0-6, V O'Mahony 1-0, J O'Leary 0-2, M Kelleher 0-1.

9 June 1984 Second round	St. Finbarr's	1-08 - 2-08	Blackrock	Páirc Uí Chaoimh
	T Leahy 1-1, M Kennedy 0-4, S Murphy 0-3.		F Delaney 0-5, M Lyons 1-0, M Kilcoyne 1-0, J Murphy 0-2, G Allen 0-1.

=== Quarter-finals ===
17 June 1984 Quarter-final	Castletownroche	1-15 - 3-08	Bishopstown	Mallow
	Dave Relihan 1-8, W Walsh 0-3, W Magnier 0-1, D Mellerick 0-1, R Quirke 0-1, D O'Mahony 0-1.		G McCarthy 1-3, E Murphy 1-0, M Coughlan 1-0, P Doyle 0-2, C Coffey 0-1, E Lyons 0-1, B Murphy 0-1.

23 June 1984 Quarter-final	Mallow	4-05 - 3-05	Newcestown	Inniscarra
	D Murphy 2-3, T Coakley 2-0, P Buckley 0-1, P Shine 0-1.		G Long 1-0, E Desmond 1-0, P Ryan 1-0, T Crowley 0-3, O O'Sullivan 0-1, K Kehilly 0-1.

30 June 1984 Quarter-final	Cloughduv	1-17 - 2-06	Bandon	Páirc Naomh Eoin
	D O'Leary 0-6, C Kelly 1-2, J Dunlea 0-4, T Barry-Murphy 0-2, M Ring 0-2, P Lucey 0-1.		J Murphy 2-0, P Crowley 0-2, R Wilmot 0-1, P O'Donovan 0-1, P Desmond 0-1, K O'Driscoll 0-1.

8 July 1984 Quarter-final	Erin's Own	3-08 - 1-08	Blackrock	Mayfield
	PJ Murphy 1-1, R O'Connor 1-1, M Bowen 0-4, Bernard Murphy 1-0, D Ahern 0-1, F Horgan 0-1.		D Cronin 1-0, P O'Neill 0-3, M Lyons 0-2, P Hayes 0-1, P Kavanagh 0-1, J O'Grady 0-1.

=== Semi-finals ===
14 July 1984 Semi-final	Cloughduv	0-12 - 0-10	Mallow	Church Road
	T Barry-Murphy 0-3, C Kelly 0-3, D O'Leary 0-2, L Lynch 0-2, P Lucey 0-1, M Ring 0-1.		E Carey 0-3, T Coakley 0-2, A Copps 0-2, G Hayes 0-1, P Shine 0-1, D Murphy 0-1.

22 July 1984 Semi-final	Erin's Own	5-13 - 3-10	Castletownroche	Felix Sarsfield Memorial Park
	F Horgan 3-1, M Bowen 1-4, A Murphy 1-1, K Horgan 0-3, R O'Connor 0-1, B Murphy 0-1, PJ Murphy 0-1, J Bowen 0-1.		Dave Relihan 1-4, K McSweeney 1-1, Dan Relihan 1-0, W Magnier 0-3, W Walsh 0-1, D Mellerick 0-1.

=== Final ===
19 August 1984 Final	Erin's Own	0-15 - 1-05	Cloughduv	Páirc Uí Chaoimh
	A Murphy 0-4, PJ Murphy 0-3, M Bowen 0-3, F Horgan 0-2, R O'Connor 0-2, F Harris 0-1.		P Lucey 1-0, T Barry-Murphy 0-2, T Dunne 0-1, M Ring 0-1, DP Ring 0-1.

== Championship statistics ==
=== Top scorers ===
Overall

Rank	Player	Club	Tally	Total	Matches	Average
1	Dave Relihan	Castletownroche	2-15	21	3	7.00
2	Gabriel McCarthy	Bishopstown	2-09	15	2	7.50
2	Martin Bowen	Erin's Own	1-12	15	4	3.75
4	Frank Horgan	Erin's Own	3-05	14	4	3.50
4	Pádraig Crowley	Bandon	2-08	14	2	7.00
4	P. J. Murphy	Erin's Own	2-08	14	4	3.50
4	Finbarr Delaney	Blackrock	1-11	14	2	7.00
8	Dan Relihan	Castletownroche	3-03	12	3	4.00
9	Donal Murphy	Mallow	2-05	11	3	3.66
9	Raymond O'Connor	Erin's Own	1-08	11	4	2.75
9	Don O'Leary	CLoughduv	0-11	11	4	2.75

In a single game

Rank	Player	Club	Tally	Total	Opposition
1	Pádraig Crowley	Bandon	2-06	12	Éire Óg
2	Dave Relihan	Castletownroche	1-08	11	Bishopstown
3	Frank Horgan	Erin's Own	3-01	10	Castletownroche
4	Dan Relihan	Castletownroche	2-03	9	Tracton
4	Donal Murphy	Mallow	2-03	9	Newcestown
4	Finbarr Delaney	Blackrock	1-06	9	Mayfield
4	Gabriel McCarthy	Bishopstown	1-06	9	St. Vincent's
8	Christy Clancy	St. Catherine's	0-08	8	Mallow
9	Mick Magnier	Castletownroche	2-01	7	Tracton
9	Martin Bowen	Erin's Own	1-04	7	Castletownroche
9	Dave Relihan	Castletownroche	1-04	7	Erin's Own
