= 2015 Cork Senior Hurling Championship =

Annual hurling competition season

- Dates: 11 April 2015 – 11 October 2015
- Teams: 23
- Sponsor: Evening Echo
- Champions: Glen Rovers (26th title); Graham Callinan (captain); Richie Kelleher (manager)
- Runners-up: Sarsfields; Eoin Quigley (captain); Pat Ryan (manager)
- Relegated: Killeagh

Tournament statistics
- Matches played: 34
- Goals scored: 82 (2.41 per match)
- Points scored: 1168 (34.35 per match)
- Top scorer(s): Cian McCarthy (2-52)

The 2015 Cork Senior Hurling Championship was the 127th staging of the Cork Senior Hurling Championship since its establishment by the Cork County Board in 1887. The draw for the 2015 fixtures took place on 14 December 2014 at Páirc Uí Chaoimh. The championship began on 11 April 2015 and ended on 11 October 2015.

The championship was won by Glen Rovers who secured the title following a 2–17 to 1–13 defeat of Sarsfields in the final. This was their 26th championship title, their first in 26 years.

Sarsfield's were the defending champions.

== Team changes ==
=== To Championship ===
Promoted from the Cork Premier Intermediate Hurling Championship

- Ballyhea

=== From Championship ===
Relegated to the Cork Premier Intermediate Hurling Championship

- Courcey Rovers

=== Summaries ===
Team	Colours	Manager	Captain	Last title
Avondhu	Black and yellow			1996
Ballyhea	Black and white	Clem Smith	Maurice O'Sullivan	1896
Ballymartle	Green and yellow	James O'Mahony	Brian Corry	
Bishopstown	Maroon and white	Conor Doyle	Paul Honohan	
Blackrock	Green and yellow	Patrick Fitzgibbon	Shane O'Keeffe	2002
Bride Rovers	Green, white and gold	Joe Delaney	Brian Murphy	
Carrigdhoun	Red and white	Pat Desmond	Tony Murphy	
Carrigtwohill	Blue and gold	Mick Mahony	Colm O'Connell	2011
Cork IT	Red and white	Pat Mulcahy		
Douglas	Green, black and white	Cathal Collins	Mark Harrington	
Duhallow	Orange and black	Denis Withers	Alan Sheehy	
Erin's Own	Blue and red	Martin Bowen	Shane Murphy	2007
Glen Rovers	Green, yellow and black	Richie Kelleher	Graham Callinan	1989
Imokilly	Red and white	Fergal Condon	Barra Ó Tuama	1998
Killeagh	Green and white	Seán Crowley	Patrick O'Brien	
Midleton	Black and white	Jerry Wallace	Peter Dowling	2013
Na Piarsaigh	Black and yellow	Leonard Forde	Alan Brady	2004
Newtownshandrum	Green and yellow	Ed Daly	Ryan Fallon	2009
Sarsfields	Blue, black and white	Pat Ryan	Eoin Quigley	2014
St. Finbarr's	Blue and gold	John Cremin	Glen O'Connor	1993
University College Cork	Red and black	Tom Kingston	Shane Hegarty	1970
Youghal	Maroon, white and yellow	Christy Cooney	Alan Frahill-O'Connor	

== Results ==
=== Divisions/Colleges ===
11 April 2015 First round	Carrigdhoun	w/o - scr.	Muskerry

11 April 2015 First round	Duhallow	1-17 - 1-13	Carbery	Coachford
16:30	DJ O'Sullivan (1-3), D Hannon (0-5, 4f), K Sheahan (0-4), J Forrest (0-2), L McLoughlin (0-2), G Linehan (0-1).		J O'Driscoll (0-4, 3f), D Desmond (1-0), J Ryan (0-3, 2f), K Coffey (0-3), P Butler (0-2), K O'Donovan (0-1).	Referee: D Daly (Brian Dillons)

13 April 2015 First round	Imokilly	3-21 - 3-18	Avondhu	Tank Field
19:30	P O'Sullivan (0-8, 5fs), S Harnedy (2-1), B Dunne (1-3), W Leahy (0-4), D Cahill (0-3, 1f), B Lawton (0-2).		A Cagney (1-4, 4fs), P O'Brien (0-7, 3fs), P Herlihy (2-0), D O'Flynn, A Sheehan (0-2 each), S Hayes, B O'Sullivan, K O'Hanlon (0-1 each).	Referee: D Kiran (Éire Óg)

20 April 2015 First round	University College Cork	3-16 - 3-15	Cork Institute of Technology	Páirc Uí Rinn
19:00	DJ Foran (3-0), T Devine (0-4), P Curran (0-3, two frees), R O’Shea (one free) and D Geary (0-2 each), T Burke, A Spillane, B O’Sullivan, P Prendergast and J O’Sullivan (0-1 each).	Report	P Kelleher (2-0), M Kearney (1-1), J Cashman (0-6, three frees), J Cronin (0-4), N McNamara (0-2), D Collins and R Hanley (0-1 each).	Referee: K Healy (Ballymartle)

19 June 2015 Second round	Duhallow	0-24 - 0-23	Carrigdhoun	Fr. O'Driscoll Park
20:00	B Withers, D Hannon, K Sheahan 0-4 each, A Nash 0-3, M Ellis, DJ O'Sullivan, G Linehan 0-2 each, S Hehir, A Walsh, D Kenneally 0-1 each.		T Murphy 0-5 (0-1 sideline cut), D Drake 0-5, C Leary 0-4, D Lordan 0-4, F O'Leary 0-2, M O'Sullivan, W O'Brien, S McCarthy 0- each.	Referee: T O'Donovan (Douglas)

22 June 2015 Second round	University College Cork	0-17 - 0-20	Imokilly	Riverstown
19:30	Barry Lawton (0-9, 0-6 frees); M Collins (0-4); T Devine, DJ Foran, K Morrison, P Curran (0-1 each).	Report	P O’Sullivan (0-7, 0-5 frees, 0-1 sc); W Leahy (0-5); J Looney, D Dalton (0-2 frees), B Dunne (0-2 each); A Stafford, D Cahill (0-1 each).	Referee: B Coniry (Crosshaven)

=== First round ===
16 May 2015 First round	Na Piarsaigh	5-13 - 0-12	Youghal	Cloyne
19:00	I McDonnell 3-1, S O’Sullivan 1-2, K Buckley 0-5 (three frees, one 65), P Gould 1-1, C O’Mahony 0-2, J Gardiner, P Rourke 0-1 each.	Report	Brendan Ring 0-7 (four frees), A Joyce, C O’Mahony, B Cooper, B Moloney, N Roche 0-1 each.	Referee: D Copps (Ballyhea)

16 May 2015 First round	Bride Rovers	3-18 - 0-25	Bishopstown	Páirc Uí Rinn
20:00	B Johnson (0-9, 8 frees); S Glasgow, D Dooley (1-2 each); S Ryan (1-0); B Murphy, S Walsh, C O’Connor, M Collins, B O’Driscoll (0-1 each).	Report	T Murray (0-11, 8 frees); P Cronin (0-6, 1 free); B Murray, D Quaid, N Feehely (0-2 each); E McCarthy, A O’Sullivan (0-1 each).	Referee: C Lyons (Nemo Rangers)

17 May 2015 First round	Ballyhea	1-19 - 0-11	Blackrock	Páirc Mac Gearailt
14:30	P. O’Callaghan (0-9, 3 frees, 1 sideline); N. Ronan (0-5, 3 frees); E. O’Leary (1-1); G. Morrissey (0-2); J. Morrissey, M. O’Sullivan (0-1 each)	Report	D. Cashman (0-4 frees); K. O’Keeffe (0-3, 1 free, 1 ‘65’); N. Cashman (0-2 frees); S. O’Keeffe, O. Kelleher (0-1 each).	Referee: N Wall (Carrigaline)

17 May 2015 First round	Midleton	0-20 - 2-8	Killeagh	Paddy Walsh Memorial Park
15:30	C. Lehane 0-11 (0-6 frees); L. O’Farrell, S. O’Farrell and J. Nagle 0-2 each; P. Haughney, C. Walsh and P. White 0-1 each.	Report	D. Landers 1-1 frees; A. Walsh 1-0; B. Rochford (0-2 frees) and David Cahill 0-2 each; D. Walsh, S. Smiddy and E. Keniry 0-1 each.	Referee: J Larkin (Douglas)

17 May 2015 First round	Sarsfield's	0-27 - 0-29	Newtownshandrum	Páirc Mac Gearailt
16:15	C. McCarthy (0-10, 9 frees); R. O’Driscoll, G. O’Loughlin, C. Duggan (0-3 each); D. Kearney, E. O’Sullivan (0-2 each); R. Ryan, C. O’Sullivan, E. Martin, T. Óg Murphy (0-1 each).	Report	R. Clifford (0-8, 6 frees), C. Twomey (0-6, 2 frees, 1 ‘65’); J. P. King, M. Bowles (0-4 each); C. Naughton (0-3); J. Coughlan, J. Bowles (0-2 each).	Referee: D Kirwan (Éire Óg)

23 May 2015 First round	Douglas	1-14 - 0-9	St. Finbarr's	Páirc Uí Rinn
18:00	M O’Connor (0-8, 3 ‘65s’; 3 frees); M Collins (0-2); P Beale, M Harrington, A Ward and S Kingston (0-1 each)	Report	I Lordan (0-4, 1 free; 1 ‘65’); D Cahalane (0-2); E Dennehy, E Finn, P Kelleher (0-1 each).	Referee: N Wall (Carrigaline)

23 May 2015 First round	Carrigtwohill	0-16 - 2-22	Erin's Own	Páirc Lios gCúl
19:00	T. Hogan (0-9 frees); N. McCarthy (0-3); R. White (0-2); P. Hogan (0-1 free) and D. O’Mahony (0-1 each).	Report	E. Murphy (1-10, 0-10 frees); J. Sheehan (1-2); K. Murphy (0-3); A. Bowen and C. O’Callaghan (0-2 each); S. Kelly, M. Collins and S. Murphy (0-1 each).	Referee: D Copps (Ballyhea)

23 May 2015 First round	Glen Rovers	0-23 - 2-19	Ballymartle	Páirc Uí Rinn
19:45	P Horgan (0-11, 4 frees, 1 ‘65’); C Dorris (0-4); D Busteed and S Kennifick (0-2 each); D Noonan, D Brosnan, D Cunningham and G Kennifick (0-1 each).	Report	D McCarthy (1-8, 0-4 frees, 0-1 ‘65’); Jack Dwyer (0-4); B Dwyer (0-3 frees); J Wallace (1-0); K McCarthy (0-2); B Corry and S O’Mahony (0-1 each).	Referee: C McAllister (Aghada)

=== Second round ===
13 June 2015 Second round	Glen Rovers	0-13 - 0-12	Carrigtwohill	Páirc Uí Rinn
20:00	P Horgan (0-9, 8 frees, 1 ‘65); S Kennifick, D Brosnan, D Cunningham, D Noonan (0-1 each).	Report	T Hogan (0-8, 7 frees); R White, N McCarthy, D O’Driscoll, J Barrett (0-1 each).	Referee: D Kirwan (Éire Óg)

20 June 2015 Second round	Youghal	0-12 - 0-11	Killeagh	St. Catherine's GAA Grounds
19:00	B. Ring (0-5, frees); B. Cooper (0-2); A. Frahill-O’Connor, C. O’Mahony, C. O’Sullivan, N. Roche, D. O’Connell (0-1 each).	Report	J. Deane (0-4, 3 frees); E. Keniry (0-3); D. Cahill (0-2); S. Long, D. Walsh (0-1 each).	Referee: J Larkin (Douglas)

21 June 2015 Second round	St. Finbarr's	0-15 - 2-11	Blackrock	Páirc Uí Rinn
15:45	I Lordan (0-4, 3 frees, 1 65m), D Cahalane, G O’Connor and E Finn (0-2 each), J Goggin, S Sherlock, C Keane, B Beckett and B Hennessy (0-1 each).	Report	K O’Keeffe (0-5, 2 65s, 1 free), G Regan (1-1), S O’Keeffe (1-0), O Kelleher (0-3), N Cashman (0-2).	Referee: C McAllister (Aghada)

21 June 2015 Second round	Sarsfields	0-15 - 1-7	Bishopstown	Páirc Uí Rinn
19:45	C. McCarthy (0-7, 4 frees, 1 ‘65’); E. O’Sullivan (0-3); K. Murphy (0-2) T., Óg Murphy, D. Kearney, E. Quigley (0-1 each).	Report	P. Cronin (0-5, 3 frees); D. Crowley (1-0); P. Honohan, T. Murray (0-1 each).	Referee: N Wall (Carrigaline)

=== Third round ===
19 July 2015 Third round	Carrigtwohill	2-27 - 1-18	Killeagh	Clonmult Memorial Park
15:30	R White, T Hogan (frees) 0-7 each, J Barrett 1-2, N McCarthy 0-5, D O’Driscoll 1-1, S Dempsey 0-3, J Horgan, M O’Riordan 0-1 each.	Report	D Cahill 0-6, J Deane (two frees, one 65), E Keniry 0-5 each, B Collins and J Budds 0-1 each.	Referee: C Lyons (Nemo Rangers)

2 August 2015 Third round	Bishopstown	0-10 - 1-17	St. Finbarr's	Páirc Uí Rinn
16:00	P Cronin (0-8, 1 free, 1 65); B Murray, J Murphy (0-1 each).	Report	P Kelleher (0-8, 2 frees, 2 65); C Keane (1-0); B Beckett (0-3); C Walsh, D Quinn, E Keane, G O’Connor, E Maher and R O’Mahony (0-1 each).	Referee: C McAllister (Aghada)

=== Relegation play-off ===
26 September 2015 Relegation play-off	Killeagh	1-11 - 1-20	Bishopstown	Riverstown Sportsfield
19:00	E Keniry (1-2), A Walsh (0-3), J Deane (frees) and D Walsh (0-2 each), K Lane (free) and D Cahill (0-1 each).	Report	P Cronin (1-9, five frees, one 65m), T Murray (0-5), M Power and B Murray (0-2 each), A O’Sullivan and P Honohan (0-1 each).	Referee: K Healy (Ballymartle)

=== Fourth round ===
31 July 2015 Fourth round	Erin's Own	3-19 - 2-18	Na Piarsaigh	Páirc Uí Rinn
20:00	E. Murphy (0-10, 5 frees, 1 65); M. Carroll (2-2); A. Bowen (1-5); S. Cronin and Kieran Murphy (0-1 each).	Report	K. Buckley (0-7, 5 frees, 2 65’s); E. Moynihan (0-4); I. McDonnell (1-1); E. Ó hAinfin (1-0); P. Rourke (0-2); C. Buckley, D. Lee, S. O’Sullivan and P. Guest (0-1 each).	Referee: D Kirwan (Éire Óg)

1 August 2015 Fourth round	Glen Rovers	3-16 - 3-10	Bride Rovers	Páirc Uí Rinn
18:15	P Horgan (1-7, 0-5 frees); C Dorris (1-1); G Kennefick (1-0); D Busteed, D Cunningham, S Kennefick (0-2 each); B Moylan, D Dooling (0-1 each).	Report	D Dooley (0-1 free), M Collins (1-1 each); B Johnson (0-4, 0-4 frees); J Murphy (1-0); F Collins, C O’Connor, J Mannix, S Glasgow (0-1 each).	Referee: C Lyons (Nemo Rangers)

1 August 2015 Fourth round	Ballymartle	1-13 - 2-13	Carrigtwohill	Páirc Uí Rinn
20:00	D McCarthy (0-6, 0-3 frees, 0-1 ’65); J Wallace (1-2, 0-1 free); J Dwyer, R Dwyer (0-2 each); S Corry (0-1 each).	Report	R White (1-1); T Hogan (0-4, 0-3 frees); S Devlin (1-0, pen); D O’Driscoll, J Barrett (0-3 each); L O’Sullivan, S Dempsey (0-1 each).	Referee: J Larkin (Douglas)

9 August 2015 Fourth round	Sarsfields	0-28 - 0-11	Youghal	Páirc Uí Riain
	C. McCarthy (0-14, 9 frees, 1 ’65); E. O’Sullivan and D. Kearney (0-3 each); G. O’Loughlin and K. Murphy (0-2 each); C. O’Sullivan, R. O’Driscoll, W. Kearney and L. Hackett (0-1 each).	Report	B. Ring (0-3, 1 free); D. Ring (1 ’65) and C. O’Mahony (0-2 each); J. O’Mahony, B. Cooper, O. Dempsey (free) and A. Joyce (0-1 each).	Referee: N Wall (Carrigaline)

15 August 2015 Fourth round	St. Finbarr's	1-13 - 1-15	Midleton	Páirc Uí Rinn
19:45	B Beckett (0-7, 3 frees); R O’Mahony (1-0); E Finn (0-3); E Dennehy, C Keane and B Ramsey (0-1 each).	Report	C Lehane (0-5, 3 frees); J Nagle (1-1); P Haughney (0-3); C Walsh (0-2); P White, S O’Farrell, L O’Farrell and A Ryan (0-1 each).	Referee: D Copps (Ballyhea)

22 August 2015 Fourth round	Douglas	3-16 - 1-13	Duhallow	Coachford
18:30	A Cadogan (1-5, 1 free); F Desmond (1-2); S Moylan (1-1); M Collins and M Harrington (0-2 each); J Moylan, A Ward, E Dolan and J Collins (0-1 each).	Report	E Brosnan (0-5); K Sheahan (1-1); D Hannon, M Ellis and A Walsh (1 free) (0-2 each); B O’Sullivan (0-1).	Referee: C McAllister (Aghada)

23 August 2015 Fourth round	Blackrock	1-18 - 3-18	Newtownshandrum	Mallow GAA Complex
15:30	D Cashman (0-6, four frees), S O’Keeffe (1-1), M O’Halloran (0-3), G O’Regan and C Cormack (0-2 each), A O’Callaghan, E O’Farrell, R Laide and K O’Keeffe (pen) (0-1 each).	Report	J Coughlan (1-0 pen) and JP King (1-2 each), D Stack (1-1), R Clifford (two frees) and T O’Mahony (0-4 each), C Twomey (free), M Bowles, M Thompson, C Naughton and J Lane (0-1 each).	Referee: C Lyons (Nemo Rangers)

25 August 2015 Fourth round	Imokilly	2-28 - 3-11	Ballyhea	Moore Park
18:45	D Dalton (1-0 pen, four frees) and P O’Sullivan (two frees) (1-4 each), S Harnedy (0-7), B Dunne (0-5), W Leahy (0-3), D Cahill and J Looney (0-2 each), T Geaney (0-1).	Report	P O’Callaghan (2-9, four frees), K Morrissey (1-0), G Morrissey and B Coleman (0-1 each).	Referee: J Larkin (Douglas)

=== Quarter-finals ===
30 August 2015 Quarter-final	Erin's Own	0-16 - 0-8	Carrigtwohill	Páirc Uí Rinn
15:45	E Murphy (0-5, 0-4 frees); Kieran Murphy, A Bowen (0-3 each); M Collins, R O’Flynn (0-2 each), Killian Murphy (0-1).	Report	T Hogan (0-2 frees), R White (0-2 each); N Furlong, N McCarthy, S Rohan, D O’Driscoll (0-1 each).	Referee: N Wall (Carrigaline)

5 September 2015 Quarter-final	Sarsfields	0-20 - 0-16	Imokilly	Páirc Uí Conaill
17:00	C. McCarthy (0-8, 7 frees); E. O’Sullivan (0-5); R. O’Driscoll (0-3); C. O’Sullivan (0-2); E. Quigley and D. Kearney (0-1 each).	Report	D. Dalton (3 frees, 1 ’65) and P. O’Sullivan (2 frees), (0-4 each); W. Leahy and B. Lawton (0-3 each); N. Motherway and B. Dunne (0-1 each).	Referee: J Larkin (Douglas)

5 September 2015 Quarter-final	Douglas	0-11 - 1-17	Midleton	Páirc Uí Rinn
18:00	M O’Connor (0-8, 7 frees, 1 65); A Cadogan, A Ward and E Dolan (0-1 each)	Report	C Walsh (0-9, 6 frees, 1 65); J Nagle (1-1); P White, L O’Farrell (free) (0-2 each); P O’Farrell, C Hurley, P Haughney (0-1 each).	Referee: D Kirwan (Éire Óg)

5 September 2015 Quarter-final	Glen Rovers	1-22 - 2-12	Newtownshandrum	Páirc Uí Rinn
19:45	P Horgan (0-13, 11 frees), B Phelan (1-2), C Dorris (0-3), D Busteed (0-2), B Moylan and D Noonan (0-1 each).	Report	J Coughlan (2-0), R Clifford (frees) and C Naughton (0-3 each), M Thompson (0-2), C Twomey (65m), J P King, M Bowles and D Stack (0-1 each).	Referee: C McAllister (Aghada)

=== Semi-finals ===
27 September 2015 Semi-final	Midleton	1-12 - 0-18	Glen Rovers	Páirc Uí Rinn
14:15	C Walsh 1-6 (four frees), P Haughney 0-3, S O’Farrell, B Hartnett, L O’Farrell 0-1 each.	Report	P Horgan 0-10 (four frees, four 65s), C Dorris 0-3, D Noonan 0-2, B Moylan, D Brosnan, D Busteed 0-1 each.	Referee: D Kirwan (Éire Óg)

27 September 2015 Semi-final	Erin's Own	1-13 - 0-16	Sarsfields	Páirc Uí Rinn
16:00	E Murphy (1-10, 1-0 pen, 0-7f, 0-1 65); M Collins, S Cronin and R O’Flynn (0-1 each).	Report	C McCarthy (0-6f); R O’Driscoll (0-3); D Kearney (0-2); E O’Sullivan, E Quigley, D Roche, P Leopold, T Óg Murphy (0-1 each)

3 October 2015 Semi-final replay	Erin's Own	1-14 - 4-15	Sarsfields	Páirc Uí Rinn
19:30	E Murphy (1-8, 1-0 pen, 6 frees); K Murphy (0-3); M Collins, A Bowen and A Power (0-1 each).	Report	C McCarthy (2-7, 3 frees, 2 ‘65s’, 1 s/line); T Óg Murphy and R Murphy (1-1 each); R O’Driscoll and L Healy (0-2 each); G O’Loughlin and C Duggan (0-1 each).	Referee: J Larkin (Douglas)

=== Final ===
11 October 2015 Final	Glen Rovers	2-17 - 1-13	Sarsfields	Páirc Uí Rinn
	P Horgan (0-9, seven frees), D Cunningham (1-2), D Dooling (1-0), D Brosnan (0-3), G Callanan (0-1), C Dorris (0-1), D Busteed (0-1).	Report	C McCarthy (1-6, four frees, one ‘65), G O’Loughlin (0-3), E Martin (0-2), R Murphy (0-1), R O’Driscoll (0-1).	Referee: D Kirwan (Cork)

== Championship statistics ==
=== Scoring ===
- First goal of the championship: D. J. O'Sullivan for Duhallow against Carbery (Divisions/Colleges first round, 10 April 2015)

=== Miscellaneous ===
- Duhallow claim only their fourth opening round win since 1982 and their first since 2006.
- The final is played at Páirc Uí Rinn for the first time.
- Sarsfield's are the first side since ]St Finbarr's between 1979-82 to qualify for four finals in a row.
- Glen Rovers win the championship for the first time since 1989. The victory gives them their 26th title and puts them into second position on the all-time roll of honour.
- Ballyhea return to the senior championship for the first time since 2003

== Top scorers ==
Overall

Rank	Player	County	Tally	Total	Matches	Average
1	Cian McCarthy	Sarsfield's	3-58	67	7	9.57
2	Patrick Horgan	Glen Rovers	1-59	62	6	10.33
3	Eoghan Murphy	Erin's Own	3-43	52	5	10.40
4	Pa Cronin	Bishopstown	1-28	31	4	7.75
5	Tomás Hogan	Carrigtwohill	0-30	30	5	6.00
6	Paudie O'Sullivan	Imokilly	1-23	26	4	6.50
7	Pa O'Callaghan	Ballyhea	2-18	24	2	12.00
8	Cormac Walsh	Midleton	1-18	21	4	5.25
9	Darren McCarthy	Ballymartle	1-14	17	2	7.00
10	Conor Lehane	Midleton	0-16	16	2	8.00

Single game

Rank	Player	Club	Tally	Total	Opposition
1	Pa O'Callaghan	Ballyhea	2-9	15	Imokilly
2	Cian McCarthy	Sarsfields	0-14	14	Youghal
3	Cian McCarthy	Sarsfields	2-7	13	Erin's Own
3	Eoghan Murphy	Erin's Own	1-10	13	Carrigtwohill
3	Eoghan Murphy	Erin's Own	1-10	13	Sarsfields
3	Patrick Horgan	Glen Rovers	0-13	13	Newtownshandrum
7	Pa Cronin	Bishopstown	1-9	12	Killeagh
8	Darren McCarthy	Ballymartle	1-8	11	Glen Rovers
8	Eoghan Murphy	Erin's Own	1-8	11	Sarsfields
8	Conor Lehane	Midleton	0-11	11	Killeagh
8	Thomas Murray	Bishopstown	0-11	11	Bride Rovers
8	Patrick Horgan	Glen Rovers	0-11	11	Ballymartle
