= 2007 Cork Senior Hurling Championship =

Annual hurling competition season

- Dates: 20 April 2007 – 14 October 2007
- Teams: 25
- Sponsor: Evening Echo
- Champions: Erin's Own (3rd title); Kieran Murphy (captain); P. J. Murphy (manager)
- Runners-up: Newtownshandrum; Philip Noonan (captain); Simon Morrissey (manager)
- Relegated: Douglas

Tournament statistics
- Top scorer(s): Kevin Murray (1-32)

The 2007 Cork Senior Hurling Championship was the 11th staging of the Cork Senior Hurling Championship since its establishment by the Cork County Board in 1887. The draw for the 2017 fixtures took place in December 2006. The championship began on 20 April 2007 and ended on 14 October 2007.

Erin's Own were the defending champions.

Douglas were relegated from the championship after losing two play-off games in the relegation section.

On 14 October 2007, Erin's Own won the championship following a 1–11 to 1–7 defeat of Newrownshandrum in the final. This was their third championship title ever and their second title in succession.

== Team changes ==
=== To Championship ===
Promoted from the Cork Premier Intermediate Hurling Championship

- Bishopstown

=== From Championship ===
Relegated from the Cork Senior Hurling Championship

- Delaney Rovers

== Results ==
=== Round 1 ===
5 May 2007 Round 1	Killeagh	0-12 - 1-11	Midleton	Cloyne Sportsfield, Cloyne
	J Deane 0-8, M Byrne 0-2, M Landers 0-1, B Barry 0-1.		L O'Farrell 1-1, M O'Connell 0-4, S Hennessy 0-2, A Cotter 0-1, A Ryan 0-1, C Hurley 0-1, W O'Brien 0-1,	Referee: J Sexton (Ballyhea)

5 May 2007 Round 1	St. Finbarr's	0-09 - 2-13	Bride Rovers	Páirc Uí Chaoimh, Cork
	K Murray 0-4, C McCarthy 0-3, P Cronin 0-1, R Curran 0-1.		J O'Driscoll 1-3, M Collins 1-1, B Johnson 0-4, S Ryan 0-3, T Broderick 0-2.	Referee: A Cummins (Ballymartle)

5 May 2007 Round 1	Castlelyons	0-09 - 4-15	Newtownshandrum	Kildorrery Sportsfield, Kildorrery
	T McCarthy 0-8, J O'Leary 0-1.		R Clifford 3-3, B O'Connor 1-3, M Bowles 0-4, C Naughton 0-3, AT O'Brien 0-2.	Referee: C Lyons (Nemo Rangers)

6 May 2007 Round 1	St. Catherine's	0-05 - 1-11	Na Piarsaigh	Jamesy Kelleher Park, Dungourney
	S Cotter 0-2, S Kearney 0-1, M Fitzgerald 0-1, C Ahern 0-1.		D Gardiner 1-3, P Gould 0-5, C O'Sullivan 0-1, S Óg Ó hAilpín 0-1, C Lynch 0-1.	Referee: D Farrell (Mitchelstown)

6 May 2007 Round 1	Ballinhassig	0-12 - 0-16	Glen Rovers	Páirc Uí Chaoimh, Cork
	D O'Callaghan 0-5, F O'Leary 0-3, M Coleman 0-1, P O'Sullivan 0-1, D Cineen 0-1, P Coomey 0-1.		P Horgan 0-6, E Cronin 0-5, G Callanan 0-2, K O'Callaghan 0-1, S Cunningham 0-1, C Dorris 0-1.	Referee: C McAllister (Aghada)

7 May 2007 Round 1	Erin's Own	0-17 - 0-12	Bishopstown	Páirc Uí Chaoimh, Cork
	M O'Connor 0-5, E Murphy 0-4, K Murphy 0-3, C O'Connor 0-2, C O'Leary 0-1, M Murphy 0-1, B Clifford 0-1.		P Cronin 0-8, C O'Neill 0-2, T Bogue 0-1, T Creed 0-1.	Referee: D Kirwan (Éire Óg)

12 May 2007 Round 1	Cloyne	0-16 - 0-10	Douglas	Jamesy Kelleher Park, Dungourney
	D Óg Cusack 0-7, C Cusack 0-3, D O'Sullivan 0-2, M Naughton 0-2, C O'Sullivan 0-1, D Ring 0-1.		M Harrington 0-5, S Moylan 0-3, B Fitzgerald 0-1, J Moylan 0-1.	Referee: D Copps (Ballyhea)

13 May 2007 Round 1	Sarsfields	0-13 - 0-12	Blackrock	Páirc Uí Chaoimh, Cork
	P Ryan 0-6, R Ryan 0-2, K Murphy 0-2, M Cussen 0-1, D Kearney 0-1, J Murphy 0-1.		A Coughlan 0-8, D Cashman 0-2, D Gosnell 0-1, A Browne 0-1.	Referee: A Cummins (Ballymartle)

=== Round 2 ===
2 June 2007 Round 2	St. Catherine's	2-10 - 0-15	Blackrock	Carrigtwohill Sportsfield, Carrigtwohill
	S Kearney 1-0, S Barry 1-0, S Cotter 0-3, M Fitzgerald 0-3, R O'Connell 0-2, K Morrison 0-1, C Ahern 0-1.		A Coughlan 0-4, D Cashman 0-3, B O'Keeffe 0-2, A Browne 0-2, C O'Leary 0-2, L Meaney 0-1, R Ryan 0-1.	Referee: D Kirwan (Éire Óg)

2 June 2007 Round 2	Ballinhassig	2-14 - 2-11	Bishopstown	Páirc Uí Rinn, Cork
	D O'Callaghan 0-7, P Coomey 1-1, P Lombard 1-0, D O'Sullivan 0-2, J Mullaney 0-1, F O'Leary 0-1, B O'Sullivan 0-1, M Coleman 0-1.		P CRonin 0-9, K O'Halloran 2-0, J Murphy 0-2.	Referee: D O'Leary (Cloughduv)

3 June 2007 Round 2	Killeagh	1-10 - 0-12	Castlelyons	St. Catherine's Park, Ballynoe
	M Landers 1-2, J Deane 0-3, B Barry 0-2, L Collins 0-1, D Kelleher 0-1, A Walsh 0-1.		T McCarthy 0-9, E Fitzgerald 0-1, L Sexton 0-1, J Sexton 0-1.	Referee: D Copps (Ballyhea)

23 June 2007 Round 2	St. Finbarr's	2-16 - 2-15	Douglas	Páirc Uí Chaoimh, Cork
	K Murray 1-6 (0-4 frees), G McCarthy 1-3, G O’Connor 0-3 (0-2 frees), C McCarthy, R O’Mahony, M Ryan and R Curran (free) 0-1 each.	Report	S Moylan 1-5 (0-3 frees), E Cadogan 0-4, S McCarthy 1-0, B Fitzgerald, W Coveney and M Harrington (0-1 free, 0-1 ’65) 0-2 each.

=== Relegation play-off ===
23 September 2007 Semi-final	Bishopstown	1-15 - 2-08	Douglas	Páirc Uí Rinn, Cork
	J Murphy 1-1, P Cronin 0-4, K McCarthy 0-3, M Power 0-3, T Murray 0-1, S O'Neill 0-1, R Conway 0-1, I Jones 0-1.		E Cadogan 1-1, G McLoughlin 1-0, S Moylan 0-3, T Harrington 0-2, B Fitzgerald 0-2.	Referee: C McAllister (Aghada)

7 October 2007 Semi-final	Blackrock	3-13 - 1-11	Castlelyons	Páirc Mac Gearailt, Fermoy
	A Browne 1-5, L Meaney 1-1, D Cashman 1-0, J Young 0-2, B O'Keeffe 0-2, A Coughlan 0-2, C O'Leary 0-1.		T McCarthy 0-8, D Wallace 1-0, E Fitzgerald 0-2, C McGann 0-1.	Referee: K Healy (Ballymartle)

27 October 2007 Final	Castlelyons	2-07 - 0-08	Douglas	Páirc Mac Gearailt, Fermoy
	T McCarthy 1-4, C O'Connor 1-0, E Fitzgerald 0-2, S Cotter 0-1.		S Moylan 0-3, M Harrington 0-2, E Cadogan 0-2, J Moylan 0-1.	Referee: A Copps (Ballyhea)

=== Divisional/colleges section ===
20 April 2007 Round 1	Imokilly	1-18 - 0-11	Carbery	Páirc Uí Rinn, Cork
	R White 1-3, T O'Keeffe 0-6, N McCarthy 0-3, P Cahill 0-2, S O'Callaghan 0-1, P O'Neill 0-1, G O'Leary 0-1, S O'Farrell 0-1.		K Griffin 0-5, G Coleman 0-2, D McCarthy 0-2, R Collins 0-1, K Hurley 0-1.	Referee: C Lyons (Nemo Rangers)

11 May 2007 Round 1	Carrigdhoun	7-24 - 0-12	Duhallow	Coachford Sportsfield, Coachford
	K Canty 4-2, S Corcoran 1-5, B Dwyer 1-3, E Manning 1-2, G White 0-4, R Dwyer 0-3, M O'Mahony 0-2, R Butler 0-2, D Dwyer 0-1.		D Crowley 0-4, N O'Callaghan 0-4, S Whelan 0-1, S O'Leary 0-1, D Murphy 0-1, J McLoughlin 0-1.	Referee: P Downey (Inniscarra)

12 May 2007 Round 1	Seandún	2-17 - 1-20	Avondhu	Ballinlough Sportsfield, Ballinlough
	J Horgan 2-8, C Barry 0-3, K Foley 0-3, C Brosnan 0-1, P Keane 0-1, R Foley 0-1.		J O'Callaghan 1-6, P Dineen 0-5, K Curtin 0-3, D Stack 0-2, M Allen 0-2, D O'Connell 0-1, K Walsh 0-1.	Referee: D O'Leary (Cloughduv)

13 May 2007 Round 1	University College Cork	1-13 - 0-16	Muskerry	Páirc Liam Mhic Cárthaigh, B'garvan
	J Halbert 1-4, J Nagle 0-4, S O'Sullivan 0-3, J Crowley 0-1, J Mulhall 0-1.		D O'Riordan 0-8, R O'Doherty 0-5, K Walsh 0-2, J Russell 0-1.

24 May 2007 Round 1 replay	Seandún	2-09 - 0-18	Avondhu	Manning Park, Passage
	J Horgan 1-4, M Carey 1-0, D Lucey 0-3, K Foley 0-2.		P Dineen 0-7, P Kissane 0-3, L O'Connor 0-3, K Curtin 0-2, P O'Brien 0-1, E O'Sullivan 0-1, T Kenneally 0-1.	Referee: D Kirwan (Éire Óg)

29 May 2007 Round 1 replay	University College Cork	0-13 - 1-13	Muskerry	Ballinhassig Sportsfield, Ballinhassig
	J Halbert 0-4, P Finnegan 0-4, J O'Gorman 0-1, J Nagle 0-1, R Foley 0-1, K Hartnett 0-1, D O'Sullivan 0-1.		D O'Riordan 1-2, D O'Connell 0-3, T Kenny 0-3, J Russell 0-2, K Walsh 0-1, D Corkery 0-1, T O'Mahony 0-1.	Referee: G O'Connell (Lisgoold)

24 June 2007 Round 2	Cork Institute of Technology	2-23 - 1-10	Muskerry	Páirc Uí Rinn, Cork
	D Crowley 1-4, C O’Neill 1-3, M O’Sullivan 0-6 (0-1 free), A Mannix 0-4, L Desmond 0-4 (0-1 free), M Dunne, E Dillon 0-1 each.	Report	D O’Connell 1-2, D O’Riordan 0-3 (all frees), J Hurley 0-2, D Corkery 0-2, K Walsh 0-1.

=== Round 3 ===
17 August 2007 Round 3	Erin's Own	0-16 - 0-13	Carrigdhoun	Páirc Uí Chaoimh, Cork
	E Murphy 0-6, Kieran Murphy 0-3, P Kelly 0-2, M O'Connor 0-2, B Clifford 0-2, Killian Murphy 0-1.		R Dwyer 0-5, K Canty 0-3, B Dwyer 0-2, S O'Sullivan 0-1, J Kingston 0-1, R Butler 0-1.	Referee: D Copps (Ballyhea)

18 August 2007 Round 3	Cloyne	0-11 - 1-11	Midleton	Páirc Uí Chaoimh, Cork
	Diarmuid O'Sullivan 0-4, C O'Sullivan 0-2, Donal O'Sullivan 0-2, L O'Driscoll 0-1, J Nyhan 0-1, M Cahill 0-1.		K Mulcahy 1-0, A Ryan 0-3, M O'Connell 0-3, W O'Brien 0-1, S Hennessy 0-1, L Walsh 0-1, S O'Farrell 0-1, K Hurley 0-1.	Referee: D Kirwan (Éire Óg)

18 August 2007 Round 3	Newtownshandrum	2-17 - 0-16	Na Piarsaigh	Páirc Uí Chaoimh, Cork
	C Naughton 1-4, B O'Connor 0-7, John O'Connor 1-1, J Herlihy 0-2, R Clifford 0-1, J Bowles 0-1, JP King 0-1.		P Gould 0-9, C O'Sullivan 0-2, M Prendergast 0-2, J Gardiner 0-2, SP O'Sullivan 0-1.	Referee: C McAllister (Aghada)

18 August 2007 Round 3	Ballinhassig	2-09 - 1-18	St. Finbarr's	Páirc Uí Rinn, Cork
	F O'Leary 2-1, D Dineen 0-3, P Coomey 0-2, S Dineen 0-1, J Ahern 0-1, M Coleman 0-1.		K Murray 0-7, C McCarthy 1-1, R O'Mahony 0-4, B O'Driscoll 0-2, R Curran 0-1, G McCarthy 0-1, M Ryan 0-1, J Crowley 0-1.	Referee: J Sexton (Ballyhea)

18 August 2007 Round 3	Bride Rovers	2-14 - 1-12	Cork Institute of Technology	Riverstown Sportsfield, Glanmire
	B Johnson 0-5, M Collins 1-1, D Ryan 1-0, T Broderick 0-3, S Ryan 0-2, B Hazelwood 0-2, P Murphy 0-1.		L Desmond 0-4, E Chawke 1-0, B Corry 0-3, A Mannix 0-2, J Hurney 0-1, B Ahern 0-1, J Griffin 0-1.	Referee: J Dorgan (Nemo Rangers)

18 August 2007 Round 3	Killeagh	2-10 - 4-13	Glen Rovers	Carrigtwohill Sportsfield, Carrigtwohill
	D Kelleher 1-1, B Barry 1-0, J Deane 0-3, M Landers 0-2, J Budds 0-2, K Lane 0-1, B Collins 0-1.		P Horgan 3-6, G Hackett 1-1, D Cunningham 0-2, D Busteed 0-2, B Moylan 0-1, E Cronin 0-1.	Referee: K Healy (Ballymartle)

19 August 2007 Round 3	St. Catherine's	0-14 - 1-13	Avondhu	Páirc Mac Gearailt, Fermoy
	S Cotter 0-6, S Kearney 0-2, M Fitzgerald 0-2, R O'Connell 0-1, J Sheehan 0-1, C Aherne 0-1, D Farrell 0-1.		P Dineen 1-5, F McCormack 0-3, P Kissane 0-1, Alan O'Connor 0-1, D Fitzgerald 0-1, T O'Riordan 0-1, K Curtin 0-1.	Referee: A Cummins (Ballymartle)

25 August 2007 Round 3	Sarsfields	2-15 - 1-24	Imokilly	Páirc Mac Gearailt, Fermoy
	P Ryan 0-6, T Óg Murphy 1-1, P Barry 1-1, K Murphy 0-2, D Kearney 0-1, M Cussen 0-1, R Murphy 0-1, J Murphy 0-1, G O'Loughlin 0-1.		N McCarthy 0-8, R White 1-3, J Barrett 0-5, P Cahill 0-3, S O'Callaghan 0-2, S O'Farrell 0-2, S O'Leary 0-1.	Referee: D O'Leary (Cloughduv)

=== Quarter-finals ===
8 September 2007 Quarter-final	Erin's Own	3-15 - 1-15	Avondhu	Páirc Uí Chaoimh, Cork
	E Murphy 0-6, K Murphy 0-5, R O'Carroll 1-1, C Coakley 1-1, C O'Connor 1-0, B Clifford 0-1, S Cronin 0-1.		P Dineen 0-5, N Ronan 0-5, F McCormack 1-1, P Kissane 0-2, B Coleman 0-1, K Curtin 0-1.	Referee: D O'Leary (Cloughduv)

9 September 2007 Quarter-final	Newtownshandrum	2-15 - 1-12	Glen Rovers	Páirc Uí Chaoimh, Cork
	B O'Connor 0-7, Jerry O'Connor 1-1, R Clifford 1-0, J Bowles 0-2, JP King 0-2, AT O'Brien 0-1, W O'Mahony 0-1, John O'Connor 0-1.		P Horgan 1-9, S McDonnell 0-1, D Busteed 0-1, G Moylan 0-1.

9 September 2007 Quarter-final	Midleton	1-15 - 2-14	Bride Rovers	Páirc Uí Chaoimh, Cork
	M O'Connell 0-4, L Walsh 0-4, P O'Shea 1-0, L O'Farrell 0-2, C Mulcahy 0-1, C Hurley 0-1, S O'Farrell 0-1, W O'Brien 0-1, A Ryan 0-1.		M Collins 1-3, B Johnson 1-3, R Cahill 0-3, T Broderick 0-3, S Ryan 0-1, P Murphy 0-1.	Referee: J Sexton (Ballyhea)

22 September 2007 Quarter-final	St. Finbarr's	1-13 - 2-08	Imokilly	Páirc Uí Chaoimh, Cork
	K Murray 0-8, C McCarthy 1-0, R O'Mahony 0-2, M Ryan 0-1, G McCarthy 0-1, R Curran 0-1.		R White 1-2, N McCarthy 1-1, T O'Keeffe 0-3, B Ring 0-1, S O'Farrell 0-1.	Referee: D Copps (Ballyhea)

=== Semi-finals ===
23 September 2007 Semi-final	Newtownshandrum	1-19 - 2-07	Bride Rovers	Páirc Uí Chaoimh, Cork
	John O'Connor 1-3, B O'Connor 0-6, AT O'Brien 0-4, C Naughton 0-2, Jerry O'Connor 0-1, J Bowles 0-1, J Herlihy 0-1, S O'Riordan 0-1.		B Johnson 1-2, J O'Driscoll 0-4, B Murphy 1-0, T Broderick 0-1.	Referee: C Lyons (Nemo Rangers)

7 October 2007 Semi-final	Erin's Own	1-15 - 0-14	St. Finbarr's	Páirc Uí Chaoimh, Cork
	E Murphy 0-8 (0-5f); M Murphy 1-1; M O'Connor 0-2; R Carroll, S Kelly, K Murphy and Cian O'Connor 0-1 each.	Report	K Murray 0-7 (0-5f); R Curran (65s) and R O'Mahony 0-2 each; C McCarthy, M Ryan and B O'Driscoll 0-1 each.	Referee: D Kirwan (Éire Óg)

=== Final ===
14 October 2007 Final	Erin's Own	1-11 - 1-07	Newtownshandrum	Páirc Uí Chaoimh, Cork
	C Coakley 1-2, E Murphy 0-5 (5f), M O'Connor 0-2, K Murphy, S Kelly 0-1 each.	Report	B O'Connor 1-3 (3f) C Naughton 0-1, A T O'Brien 0-1, John O'Connor 0-1 each.	Referee: D Kirwan (Éire Óg)

== Championship statistics ==
=== Scoring statistics ===
Top scorers overall

Rank	Player	Club	Tally	Total	Matches	Average
1	Kevin Murray	St. Finbarr's	1-32	35	5	7.00
2	Patrick Horgan	Glen Rovers	4-21	33	3	11.00
3	Ben O'Connor	Newtownshandrum	2-26	32	5	6.40
3	Timmy McCarthy	Castlelyons	1-29	32	4	8.00
4	Eoghan Murphy	Erin's Own	0-29	29	5	5.80
5	Pa Dineen	Avondhu	1-22	25	4	6.25
6	John Horgan	Seandún	3-12	21	2	10.50
6	Pa Cronin	Bishopstown	0-21	21	3	7.00
7	Barry Johnson	Bride Rovers	2-14	20	4	5.00
8	Kevin Canty	Carrigdhoun	4-05	17	2	8.50
8	Ron White	Imokilly	3-08	17	3	5.66

Top scorers in a single game

Rank	Player	Club	Tally	Total	Opposition
1	Patrick Horgan	Glen Rovers	3-06	15	Killeagh
2	Kevin Canty	Carrigdhoun	4-02	14	Duhallow
2	John Horgan	Seandún	2-08	14	Avondhu
3	Ryan Clifford	Newtownshandrum	3-03	12	Castlelyons
3	Patrick Horgan	Glen Rovers	1-09	12	Newtownshandrum
4	Kevin Murray	St. Finbarr's	1-06	9	Douglas
4	Jonathan O'Callaghan	Avondhu	1-06	9	Seandún
4	Pa Cronin	Bishopstown	0-09	9	Ballinhassig
4	Timmy McCarthy	Castlelyons	0-09	9	Killeagh
4	Pádraig Gould	Na Piarsaigh	0-09	9	Newtownshandrum

=== Miscellaneous ===
- Erin's Own retain the championship for the first time.
