= Darren McCarthy (hurler) =

Irish hurler

Personal information
- Native name: Darren Mac Cárthaigh (Irish)
- Born: 5 October 1990 (age 36) Cork, Ireland
- Occupation: Business operations analyst
- Height: 1.78 m (5 ft 10 in)

Sport
- Sport: Hurling
- Position: Midfield
Clubs*
Years	Club	Apps (scores)
	Ballymartle; Carrigdhoun	33 (16-120)
Club titles
- Cork titles: 0
College
- Years: College
- University College Cork
College titles
- Fitzgibbon titles: 1
Inter-county**
Years	County	Apps (scores)
2012-present	Cork	1 (0-1)
Inter-county titles
- Munster titles: 0
- All-Irelands: 0
- NHL: 0
- All Stars: 0
- * club appearances and scores correct as of 20:32, 10 October 2019. **Inter County team apps and scores correct as of 15:08, 20 June 2015.

Darren McCarthy (born 5 October 1990) is an Irish hurler who plays as a midfielder for the Cork senior team.

Born in Cork, McCarthy first played competitive Gaelic games during his schooling at Coláiste Chríost Rí. He arrived on the inter-county scene at the age of sixteen when he first linked up with the Cork minor team before later joining the under-21 side. He joined the senior panel during the 2012 league. McCarthy spent a number of years as sub-goalkeeper before being switched to the forwards.

At club level McCarthy is an All-Ireland medalist in the intermediate grade with Ballymartle. In addition to this he has also won one Munster medal and one championship medal in the premier intermediate grade.

== Playing career ==
=== Club ===
McCarthy plays his club hurling with Ballymartle. In 2010 he was a member of the forward line as Ballymartle faced local rivals Tracton in the final of the premier intermediate championship. A 2–14 to 0–13 victory gave McCarthy a championship medal in that grade. Ballymartle later represented the county in the provincial series of games and faced Borrisokane in the decider. A 2–14 to 0–8 win gave McCarthy a Munster medal. Dicksboro provided the opposition in the subsequent All-Ireland decider and McCarthy played a key role in securing a last-minute goal. A 3–15 to 1–20 victory gave him an All-Ireland Intermediate Club Hurling Championship medal.

=== Inter-county ===
McCarthy first came to prominence on the inter-county scene as a member of the Cork minor hurling team in 2007. That year he lined out in his provincial decider against Tipperary. An 0–18 to 1–11 defeat was the result on that occasion. Cork remained in the championship and took the "back door" route to the All-Ireland final where they faced Tipp once again. A 3–14 to 2–11 defeat was the result on that occasion.

In 2008 McCarthy lined out in a second consecutive provincial decider with Tipperary providing the opposition once again. A narrow 0–19 to 0–18 victory resulted in a first Munster medal for McCarthy.
