= Erin's Own GAA (Cork) =

Gaelic Athletic Association club located in Glounthaune, County Cork, Ireland

Erin's Own
- Rogha Éireann
- Founded: 1963
- County: Cork
- Colours: Blue and red
- Grounds: Caherlag Grounds
- Coordinates: 51°54′51.87″N 8°21′54.26″W

Playing kits
Standard colours

Senior Club Championships
	All Ireland	Munster champions	Cork champions
Hurling:	0	0	3

Erin's Own GAA is a Gaelic Athletic Association club located in Glounthaune, County Cork, Ireland. The club fields teams in hurling, Gaelic football, camogie and ladies football. The club is part of the Imokilly division.

== History ==
Located in the Little Island, Knockraha, Brooklodge and Glounthaune areas of east Cork, Erin's Own GAA Club was founded in 1963 following the amalgamation of the Knockraha and Little Island clubs. The club spent its early years operating at junior level, however, the winning of four East Cork JHC titles between 1973 and 1979 lead to the club's hurling team upgrading to the Cork IHC in 1980.

Erin's Own secured Cork IHC titles in 1984 and 1987 before claiming their very first Cork SHC title in 1992. Two years later, the club claimed its first Gaelic football successes when, after winning their inaugural East Cork JAFC title, Erin's Own claimed the Cork JAFC title.

The turn of the century saw Erin's Own enjoy one of its most successful periods. The club claimed a second Cork JAFC title in 2005, before winning back-to-back Cork SHC titles in 2006 and 2007. The club's relegation at the hands of Newtownshandrum in 2025 brought an end to 38 years of top tier hurling for the club.

== Honours ==
- Cork Premier Senior Hurling Championship (3): 1992, 2006, 2007
- Cork Senior A Hurling Championship (1): 2026
- Cork Intermediate A Hurling Championship (2): 1984, 1987
- Cork Premier Junior Hurling Championship (1): 2023
- Cork Junior A Hurling Championship (1): 2022
- Cork Junior A Football Championship (2): 1994, 2005
- East Cork Junior A Football Championship (5): 1994, 2002, 2003, 2005, 2017
- East Cork Junior A Hurling Championship (6): 1973, 1975, 1977, 1979, 2007, 2022
- Cork Premier Under-21 A Hurling Championship (3): 2002, 2004, 2005
- Cork Under-21 A Hurling Championship (1): 2016
- Cork Under-21 B Football Championship (1): 2010
- Cork Minor Hurling Championship (3): 1999, 2000, 2001
- Cork Minor A Hurling Championship (1): 1998

== Notable players ==
- Brian Corcoran: All-Ireland SHC-winner (1999, 2004, 2005)
- Timmy Kelleher: National Hurling League-winner (1992–93)
- Kieran Murphy: All-Ireland SHC-winner (2005)
- Cian O'Connor: All-Ireland SHC-winner (2004, 2005)
- Robbie O'Flynn: Munster SHC-winner (2017, 2018)
