= Dónal Óg Cusack =

Cork hurling goalkeeper

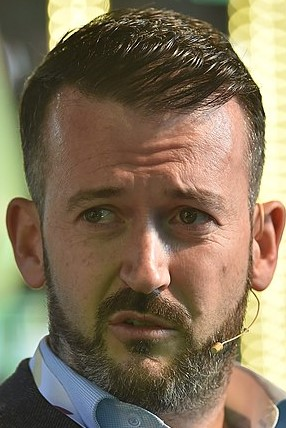

Personal information
- Native name: Dónall Óg Ó Cíosóg (Irish)
- Nickname: Ógie
- Born: 16 March 1977 (age 49) Cloyne, County Cork, Ireland
- Occupation: Automations manager
- Height: 1.83 m (6 ft 0 in)

Sport
- Sport: Hurling
- Position: Goalkeeper
Clubs*
Years	Club	Apps (scores)
1994–2021 1994–1997; 2013	Cloyne → Imokilly	52 (0–13); 17 (0–00)
Club titles
- Cork titles: 1
Inter-county**
Years	County	Apps (scores)
1996–2013	Cork	58 (0–00)
Inter-county titles
- Munster titles: 5
- All-Irelands: 3
- NHL: 1
- All Stars: 2
- * club appearances and scores correct as of 11:57, 22 April 2019. **Inter County team apps and scores correct as of 13:50, 19 April 2019.

Dónal Óg Cusack (born 16 March 1977) is an Irish hurling coach and hurler who plays for Cork Premier Championship club Cloyne. He played for the Cork senior hurling team for 16 seasons, during which time he usually lined out as a goalkeeper. Noted for his innovative and sometimes controversial approach as a player and his championing of the cause of player welfare, Cusack is also regarded as one of the greatest goalkeepers of his generation.

Cusack began his hurling career at club level with Cloyne. He broke onto the club's top adult team as a 17-year-old in 1994 and experienced his greatest success two years later when the club won the 1997 Cork Intermediate Championship title and promotion. Cusack has made 85 championship appearances in three different grades of hurling for the club, while his early prowess also saw him selected for the Imokilly divisional team with whom he won the 1997 Cork Senior Championship.

At inter-county level, Cusack was part of the successful Cork minor team that won the All-Ireland Championship in 1995 before later winning back-to-back All-Ireland Championships with the under-21 team in 1997 and 1998. He also won an All-Ireland Championships with the intermediate team in 1998. He joined the Cork senior team in 1996. Cusack eventually succeeded Ger Cunningham as first-choice goalkeeper and made a combined total of 137 National League and Championship appearances in a career that ended with his last game in 2012. During that time he was part of three All-Ireland Championship-winning teams – in 1999, 2004 and 2005. Cusack also secured five Munster Championship medals and a National Hurling League medal. He announced his retirement from inter-county hurling on 6 March 2013.

Cusack won his first All-Star in 1999, before claiming a further accolade in 2006. He is currently the player with the third-highest number of championship appearances for Cork, second only to Christy Ring and Ben O'Connor with 58 appearances. At inter-provincial level, Cusack was selected to play in six championship campaigns with Munster, with Railway Cup medals being won in 2000 and 2005.

After being involved in team management and coaching in all grades at club level with Cloyne, Cusack won the National League title in 2016 as coach of the Clare senior hurling team.

He has been appointed manager of the Cork minor hurling team for the 2020 season.

Cusack became the first openly gay elite Irish sportsman in 2009.

== Playing career ==
=== Midleton CBS ===
Cusack played in all grades of hurling during his secondary schooling at Midleton CBS Secondary School before joining the college's senior hurling side. On 27 March 1994, he lined out in goal when Midleton CBS suffered a 1–09 to 0–04 defeat by the North Monastery in the Harty Cup final.

While the 1994 Harty Cup final was supposed to be his last game, Cusack was one of 11 Midleton CBS players who repeated the Leaving Cert in an effort to claim the title. He later said: "In our world, where hurling was religion and everything else was distraction, the fact that we were making an all-out charge on the Harty Cup, Munster’s famous schools' hurling championship, was far more important than the requirements of the education system or the whims of future employers." On 26 March 1995, Cusack lined out in goal in a second successive Harty Cup final as well as captaining the team. He ended the game with a winners' medal following the 3–18 to 3–05 defeat of Lismore CBS. On 30 April, Cusack captained Midleton CBS to a 5–10 to 3-05 All-Ireland final defeat by St. Raphael's College from Loughrea.

=== Cloyne ===
Cusack joined the Cloyne club at a young age and played in all grades at juvenile and underage levels. He joined the club's top adult team as a 17-year-old during the 1994 Cork Intermediate Championship and made his first appearance at left corner-forward on 10 July in a 1–12 to 0–10 defeat of Bishopstown.

During the 1996 Cork Intermediate Championship Cusack was switched from playing as a forward to goalkeeper. On 20 October, he lined out in goal when Cloyne drew with Newtownshandrum in the final. He lined out in the same position a fortnight later when Cloyne were defeated in the replay by 0–12 to 0-09.

Cusack lined out as goalkeeper in his second successive final on 2 November 1997. A 1–12 to 1–07 defeat of Delanys secured the title, promotion to the top flight and a Cork Intermediate Championship medal for Cusack.

On 31 October 2004, Cusack was captain and coach of the team when Cloyne qualified to face Na Piarsaigh in the final of the Cork Senior Championship. He made a number of important saves and kept a clean sheet, however, Cloyne were defeated by 0–17 to 0-10.

Cloyne qualified for a second successive Cork Senior Championship final with Newtownshandrum providing the opposition on 16 October 2005. Cusack was captain of the team for a second successive year, however, Cloyne suffered a 0–15 to 0–09 defeat.

Cusack continued as coach of the team but handed the captaincy to Diarmuid O'Sullivan for the 2006 championship. On 22 October, he lined out in goal when Cloyne were defeated by 2–19 to 3-14 by Erin's Own in the final.

=== Imokilly ===
Cusack had just turned 18 when he was first selected for the Imokilly divisional team. He made his first appearance for the team on 10 June 1995 in a 1–15 to 1–13 defeat of Glen Rovers.

Cusack was again a regular for the Imokilly team throughout the 1996 championship and was in goal when Imokilly drew with Avondhu in the final on 22 September 1996. A fortnight later he was selected in the same position for the replay which Imokilly lost by 0–13 to 1-08.

Cusack was again selected in goal the following year. On 5 October 1997, he won a Cork Senior Championship medal after a 1–18 to 2–12 defeat of Sarsfields in the final.

After a 15-year period of being ineligible for selection, Cusack was recalled to the team in 2013 and was also appointed captain. His return ended with a 2–20 to 3–10 defeat by University College Cork on 8 June 2013.

=== Cork ===
==== Minor and under-21 ====
Cusack first played for Cork when he was selected for the minor team during the 1994 Munster Championship. On 10 July he won a Munster Championship medal as a non-playing substitute following Cork's 2–15 to 0–09 defeat of Waterford in the final. Cusack was also named amongst the substitutes when Cork qualified to meet Galway in the All-Ireland final. He remained on the bench for the 2–10 to 1–11 defeat.

Cusack was eligible for the minor grade again in 1995 and joined the starting fifteen as the first-choice goalkeeper. He made his first appearance for the team on 28 June in a 2–14 to 1–03 defeat of Limerick. Cusack won a second Munster Championship medal - his first on the field of play - on 9 July following a 3–18 to 0–10 defeat of Waterford. On 3 September he lined out in goal in the All-Ireland final against Kilkenny and collected a winners' medal following the 2–10 to 1–02 victory.

On 17 July 1996, Cusack made his first appearance for the Cork under-21 team in a 2–18 to 1–12 defeat of Tipperary. He won a Munster Championship medal on 24 July following a 3–16 to 2–07 defeat of Clare in the final.

Cusack was retained as first-choice goalkeeper the following season and won a second consecutive Munster Championship medal on 30 July following a 1–11 to 0–13 defeat of Tipperary in the final. On 21 October, he won an All-Ireland medal following Cork's 3–11 to 0–13 defeat of Galway in the final.

Cork dominated the championship again in 1998, with Cusack winning a third successive Munster Championship medal on 23 August following a 3–18 to 1–10 defeat of Tipperary in the final. He won a second successive All-Ireland medal on 20 September after lining out in goal in Cork's 2–15 to 2–10 defeat of Galway in the final. It was Cusack's last game in the grade.

==== Junior and intermediate ====
Cusack was called up to the Cork junior panel for the 1996 Munster Championship. He won a Munster Championship medal as a non-playing substitute on 25 June following Cork's 2–15 to 2–10 defeat of Tipperary in the final.

Cusack progressed onto the Cork intermediate team in 1997 and succeeded Fergal O'Mahony as first-choice goalkeeper when he made his first appearance in a 1–19 to 1–04 defeat of Kerry on 25 June. He won a Munster Championship medal on 23 July after lining out in goal for Cork's 1–15 to 1–12 defeat of Limerick in the final. Cusack later won an All-Ireland medal on 11 October following a 2–11 to 1–12 defeat of Galway in the final.

==== Senior ====
Cusack was just out of the minor grade when he was drafted onto the Cork senior team. He made his first appearance for the team on 12 October 1996 in a 1–11 to 2–07 defeat of Tipperary in the pre-season Waterford Crystal Cup. Cusack made his first appearance competitive appearance on 27 April in a 2–11 to 1-07 National League defeat of Meath. He was also included on Cork's panel for the 1997 Munster Championship as deputy goalkeeper to Ger Cunningham.

Cusack made two appearances for Cork during the 1998 National League. On 17 May, he won a National Hurling League medal as a non-playing substitute following a 2–14 to 0–13 defeat of Waterford in the final. Cusack was again deputy goalkeeper to Ger Cunningham for the 1998 Munster Championship.

Following the announcement of Ger Cunningham's retirement from inter-county hurling on 14 January 1999, Cusack was promoted to Cork's first-choice goalkeeper. He lined out in all six of Cork's National League games that season before making his championship debut on 13 June in a 0–24 to 1–15 defeat of Waterford. On 4 July, he won a Munster Championship medal after a 1–15 to 0–14 defeat of reigning champions Clare in the final. On 11 September, Cusack was in goal for the All-Ireland final against Kilkenny. He kept a clean sheet and claimed a winners' medal following the 0–13 to 0–12 victory. Cusack was later honoured with his first All-Star award.

On 3 July 2000, Cusack lined out in his second Munster final. He was described as "lucky" not to have been red-carded after upending Tipperary's Paul Shelly, however, he also saved a penalty from John Leahy in the 0–23 to 3–12 defeat of Tipperary.

Cork qualified for the 2002 National League final on 5 May, with Cusack lining out in goal. In the week leading up to the game there had been speculation that Gaelic Players Association members from both teams would stage a protest during the parade before the match with their socks down and jerseys out - offences punishable by fine under the GAA's match regulations. The Cork players went ahead with their pre-match protest before losing the final by 2–15 to 2-14. Later that year, Cusack gave an interview on 96FM in which he stated that young players were warned off joining the GPA. He alleged: "Younger players got calls informing them that joining the GPA would jeopardise their chances of playing with the senior team. Publicly, the county board stated they had no problem with us joining the GPA but that was not the case, and behind the scenes other forces were at work." On 29 November, Cusack and six of his teammates from the Cork hurling panel held a press conference at the Imperial Hotel to announce that all 30 members of the panel were withdrawing their services from the county in the hope of better treatment from the county board. He remained a high-profile representative at the negotiations over the following two weeks before was reached on 13 December.

Cusack lined out in his third Munster final on 29 June 2003. In spite of conceding three goals Cork won the game by 3–16 to 3–12 with Cusack winning his third Munster Championship medal. On 14 September, he was in goal for Cork's 1–14 to 1-11 All-Ireland final defeat by Kilkenny.

On 27 June 2004, Cusack lost his first Munster final when Waterford defeated Cork by 3–16 to 1-21. In spite of this defeat, Cork later qualified for the All-Ireland final against Kilkenny. A 0–17 to 0–09 victory gave Cusack a second All-Ireland medal. He ended the season by being nominated for an All-Star, but lost out to Wexford's Damien Fitzhenry for the goalkeeping berth.

Cusack won his fourth Munster Championship medal on 26 June 2005 after a 1–21 to 1–16 defeat of Tipperary in the final at Páirc Uí Chaoimh. On 11 September 2005, Cork faced Galway in the All-Ireland final for the first time since 1990. Cork won the game by 1–21 to 1-16, with Cusack collecting a third All-Ireland medal. He ended the season by being nominated for All-Star.

On 25 June 2006, Cusack won his fifth Munster Championship medal after a 2–14 to 1–14 defeat of Tipperary for the second consecutive year. Cork subsequently qualified for a fourth successive All-Ireland final, with Kilkenny providing the opposition for the third time. Cork lost the game by 1–16 to 1-13. Cusack ended the season by winning a second All-Star.

On 27 May 2007, Cusack was at the centre of what came to be known as "Semplegate". Prior to the start of the Munster Championship meeting between Cork and Clare at Semple Stadium, a number of players from both teams clashed as they emerged from the tunnel at the same time with the fighting spilling onto the pitch in front of a number of children who had formed a guard of honour. At a subsequent meeting of the GAA's Central Hearings Committee, Cork players Seán Óg Ó hAilpín, Diarmuid O'Sullivan and Cusack were served with a month-long suspension for their participation in the melee. The three players were later restored to the starting fifteen, however, Cork's championship campaign ended with an All-Ireland quarter-final replay defeat by Waterford. Cusack ended the season by receiving a fifth All-Star nomination.

For the second time in six years, the Cork senior hurling team withdrew their services in sympathy with the Cork senior football team who had also refused to play due to the appointment of Teddy Holland as team manager and the changing of the rules regarding the selection committee. Because of this, Cusack and his teammates failed to fulfil their opening two fixtures in the 2008 National League. On 19 July, Cusack was red carded for the only time in his inter-county career after dragging Galway's Alan Kerins to the ground in an All-Ireland Qualifier.

On 20 October 2008, Cusack and John Gardiner, as player representatives, met with team manager Gerald McCarthy to inform him that the majority of players on the team had lost confidence in him. McCarthy was reappointed as manager a day later, however, Cusack and Gardiner, as members of the seven-man selection committee, did not vote on the nomination of McCarthy due to what they perceived as serious problems with the appointment process. It was later revealed that only two of the 32-man Cork panel wanted to play under McCarthy. The players on the 2008 panel, with Cusack taking a more low-key role than in previous strikes, refused to play or train under McCarthy. Cork began the 2009 National League campaign with a new squad, none of whom had been able to make the previous year's panel. After months of pressure McCarthy eventually stepped down as manager with Cusack and the rest of the 2008 panel returning to play.

On 2 May 2010, Cusack lined out in goal in Cork's 2–22 to 1–17 defeat by Galway in the National League final. On 11 July, he lined out in his seventh Munster final when he was selected in goal in Cork's 2-15 apiece draw with Waterford. Cork lost the replay a week later by 1–16 to 1-13. Cusack ended the season by being nominated for his sixth All-Star.

On 29 October 2011, Cusack was named captain of the Cork senior team for the upcoming season. His captaincy was short-lived due to a season-ending Achilles tendon rupture in a National League game against Tipperary on 22 April 2012.

On 31 January 2013, it was revealed that Cusack had been omitted from the Cork panel for the National League. He announced his retirement from inter-county hurling on 6 March 2013.

=== Munster ===
Cusack was selected for the Munster inter-provincial team for the first time during the 1999 Railway Cup. On 25 November, he was an unused substitute when Munster suffered a 2–13 to 1–15 defeat by Connacht in the final.

Cusack was again included on the Munster panel for the 2000 Railway Cup. On 12 November, he won a Railway Cup medal as a non-playing substitute following Munster's 3–15 to 2–15 defeat of Leinster in the final.

After a one-year absence, Cusack was back on the Munster panel for the 2002 Railway Cup. He was an unused substitute when Munster suffered a 4–15 to 3–17 defeat by Leinster in the final on 3 November.

On 6 November 2005, Cusack was named on the bench when Munster faced Connacht in the 2005 Railway Cup final. He was introduced as a substitute for Davy Fitzgerald and collected a second winners' medal following the 1–21 to 2–14 victory.

After a two-year absence, Cusack was named on the bench when Munster faced Leinster in the Railway Cup final on 1 November 2008. He was introduced as a half-time substitute for Brendan Cummins in the 1–15 to 1–12 defeat.

On 19 February 2012, Cusack played his last game for Munster. He lined out in goal for the 3–14 to 1–16 defeat by Leinster in the Railway Cup semi-final.

== Coaching career ==
=== Clare ===
On 26 October 2015 it was announced that Cusack had been appointed coach to the Clare senior hurling team. On 1 May 2016, Clare drew 0-22 apiece with Waterford in the National League final. The replay saw Cusack collect his first silverware as coach as Clare defeated Waterford by 1–23 to 2-19.

On 9 July 2017, Clare suffered a 1–25 to 1–20 defeat by Cork in the Munster final. On 25 October, Cusack announced that he was stepping down as coach in controversial circumstances, however, a source revealed that he had planned to end his role with Clare before the controversy.

=== Cork ===
On 1 October 2019, Cusack was ratified as manager of the Cork minor hurling team.

== Personal life ==
Cusack was born in Cloyne, County Cork in March 1977. The eldest son of Donal and Bonnie Cusack, he is related to eight-time All-Ireland medal-winner Christy Ring. He is also the nephew of former Camogie player of the year, Marie Costine.

On 18 October 2009, ahead of the release of his autobiography, Come What May, Cusack disclosed to the Irish Mail on Sunday that he is gay. In Come What May he writes:

I get more out of men. Always have. I know I am different but just in this way. Whatever you may feel about me or who I am, I've always been at peace with it.

The following was serialised in the Mail on Sunday:

Since I was 13 or 14, I knew I was a bit different. I hate labels though. That's the way I am. I live with it and I am fine with it. People close to me will tell you there were never any tears. There was never agony. I just know this thing. [...] I've had to say this to people I'm close to again and again. This is who I am. This is what I do. I spend a lot of time trying to work things out but once I know something about myself, I know it. I don't agonise. It's logical to me. I thought about this but never had any problems dealing with it.

According to Cusack, discussing his sexual orientation strengthened his bond with his fellow players. He went for a walk with then captain Seán Óg Ó hAilpín, whom Cusack had known since they were boys, and told him "the whole story, stuff that I thought he would have guessed", had "a deep and complex conversation from both sides and we came out of it like brothers."

Since then Cusack has been noted as one of the few "openly gay sporting heroes". Come What May won the William Hill Irish Sports Book of the Year for 2009.

Cusack confirmed in October 2017 that he was the sportsman who gave sports journalist Tom Humphries a character reference during his trial after being charged with child molestation.

== Media career ==
On 12 May 2013, it was announced that Cusack was joining RTÉ's the Sunday Game as a hurling analyst. He remained in that position until 2015 when he stepped down after being appointed coach of the Clare senior hurling team. Cusack returned to RTÉ as an analyst in 2019.

Cusack also writes for the Irish Examiner.

== Career statistics ==
=== Club ===
As of match played 19 September 2021.

Team	Year	Cork IHC	
Team	Year	Apps	Score
Cloyne	1994	2	0-10
Cloyne	1995	2	1-05
Cloyne	1996	5	0-00
Cloyne	1997	4	0-00
Cloyne	Total	13	1-15
Cloyne	Year	Cork SHC	
Cloyne	Year	Apps	Score
Cloyne	1998	2	0-00
Cloyne	1999	1	0-00
Cloyne	2000	5	0-00
Cloyne	2001	2	0-00
Cloyne	2002	3	0-00
Cloyne	2003	5	0-00
Cloyne	2004	5	0-00
Cloyne	2005	5	0-00
Cloyne	2006	5	0-00
Cloyne	2007	2	0-07
Cloyne	2008	4	0-06
Cloyne	2009	3	0-00
Cloyne	2010	4	0-00
Cloyne	2011	6	0-00
Cloyne	2012	—	
Cloyne	Total	52	0-13
Cloyne	Year	Cork PIHC	
Cloyne	Year	Apps	Score
Cloyne	2013	5	0-00
Cloyne	2014	4	0-00
Cloyne	2015	4	0-00
Cloyne	2016	—	
Cloyne	2017	4	0-00
Cloyne	2018	3	0-00
Cloyne	2019	2	0-00
Cloyne	Total	22	0-00
Cloyne	Year	Cork SAHC	
Cloyne	Year	Apps	Score
Cloyne	2020	3	0-00
Cloyne	2021	2	0-00
Cloyne	Total	5	0-00
Career total		92	1-28

=== Division ===
Team	Year	Cork SHC	
Team	Year	Apps	Score
Imokilly	1995	4	0-00
Imokilly	1996	6	0-00
Imokilly	1997	4	0-00
Imokilly	1998	—	
Imokilly	1999	—	
Imokilly	2000	—	
Imokilly	2001	—	
Imokilly	2002	—	
Imokilly	2003	—	
Imokilly	2004	—	
Imokilly	2005	—	
Imokilly	2006	—	
Imokilly	2007	—	
Imokilly	2008	—	
Imokilly	2009	—	
Imokilly	2010	—	
Imokilly	2011	—	
Imokilly	2012	—	
Imokilly	2013	3	0-00
Career total		17	0-00

=== Inter-county ===
Team	Year	National League			Munster		All-Ireland		Total	
Team	Year	Division	Apps	Score	Apps	Score	Apps	Score	Apps	Score
Cork Minor	1994	—			0	0-00	0	0-00	0	0-00
Cork Minor	1995	—			2	0-00	2	0-00	4	0-00
Cork Minor	Total	—			2	0-00	2	0-00	4	0-00
Cork U21	1996	—			2	0-00	1	0-00	3	0-00
Cork U21	1997	—			3	0-00	2	0-00	5	0-00
Cork U21	1998	—			3	0-00	2	0-00	5	0-00
Cork U21	Total	—			8	0-00	5	0-00	13	0-00
Cork Junior	1996	—			0	0-00	0	0-00	0	0-00
Cork Junior	Total	—			0	0-00	0	0-00	0	0-00
Cork Intermediate	1997	—			2	0-00	3	0-00	5	0-00
Cork Intermediate	Total	—			2	0-00	3	0-00	5	0-00
Cork	1997	Division 2	1	0-00	0	0-00	—		1	0-00
Cork	1998	Division 1B	2	0-00	0	0-00	—		2	0-00
Cork	1999	Division 1B	6	0-00	2	0-00	2	0-00	10	0-00
Cork	2000	Division 1B	6	0-00	3	0-00	1	0-00	10	0-00
Cork	2001	Division 1B	6	0-00	1	0-00	—		7	0-00
Cork	2002	Division 1B	7	0-00	1	0-00	2	0-00	10	0-00
Cork	2003	Division 1B	6	0-00	2	0-00	3	0-00	11	0-00
Cork	2004	Division 1B	6	0-00	3	0-00	4	0-00	13	0-00
Cork	2005	Division 1B	6	0-00	2	0-00	3	0-00	11	0-00
Cork	2006	Division 1A	4	0-00	2	0-00	3	0-00	9	0-00
Cork	2007	Division 1A	5	0-00	1	0-00	5	0-00	11	0-00
Cork	2008	Division 1A	5	0-00	1	0-00	4	0-00	10	0-00
Cork	2009	Division 1	4	0-00	1	0-00	2	0-00	7	0-00
Cork	2010	Division 1	5	0-00	4	0-00	2	0-00	11	0-00
Cork	2011	Division 1	4	0-00	1	0-00	3	0-00	8	0-00
Cork	2012	Division 1A	6	0-00	—		—		6	0-00
Cork	Total		79	0-00	24	0-00	34	0-00	137	0-00
Career total			79	0-00	36	0-00	44	0-00	159	0-00

== Honours ==
=== As a player ===
Midleton CBS

- Dr Harty Cup (1): 1995

Cloyne

- Cork Intermediate Hurling Championship (1): 1997

Imokilly

- Cork Senior Hurling Championship (1): 1997

Cork

- All-Ireland Senior Hurling Championship (3): 1999, 2004, 2005
- Munster Senior Hurling Championship (5): 1999, 2000, 2003, 2005, 2006
- National Hurling League (1): 1998
- All-Ireland Intermediate Hurling Championship (1): 1997
- Munster Intermediate Hurling Championship (1): 1997
- Munster Junior Hurling Championship (1): 1996
- All-Ireland Under-21 Hurling Championship (2): 1997, 1998
- Munster Under-21 Hurling Championship (3): 1996, 1997, 1998
- All-Ireland Minor Hurling Championship (1): 1995
- Munster Minor Hurling Championship (2): 1994, 1995

Munster

- Railway Cup (2): 2000, 2005

Awards

- All Stars (2): 1999, 2006

=== As a coach ===
Clare

- National Hurling League (1): 2016
