= John Browne (hurler) =

Irish hurling manager and former hurler

Personal information
- Native name: Seán de Brún (Irish)
- Born: 1977 (age 48–49) Blackrock, County Cork, Ireland
- Occupation: Dentist
- Height: 6 ft 3 in (191 cm)

Sport
- Sport: Hurling
- Position: Left corner-back
Club*
Years	Club	Apps (scores)
1995-2009	Blackrock	64 (0-00)
Club titles
- Cork titles: 3
College
- Years: College
- 1996-2002: University College Cork
College titles
- Fitzgibbon titles: 1
Inter-county**
Years	County	Apps (scores)
1998-2005	Cork	17 (0-00)
Inter-county titles
- Munster titles: 3
- All-Irelands: 3
- NHL: 1
- All Stars: 0
- * club appearances and scores correct as of 19:40, 4 May 2019. **Inter County team apps and scores correct as of 19:44, 3 May 2019.

John Browne (born 1977) is an Irish hurling manager and former hurler who played for Cork Senior Championship club Blackrock. He played for the Cork senior hurling team over a seven-year period, during which time he usually lined out as a left corner-back. Browne's brothers, Alan and Richard, also played for Cork.

Browne began his hurling career at club level with Blackrock. He broke onto the club's senior team straight out of the minor grade in 1995 was part of three Cork Senior Championship-winning teams - 1998, 1999 and 2001. Browne's early prowess also saw him selected for University College Cork, with whom he won a Fitzgibbon Cup title.

At inter-county level, Browne was part of the successful Cork under-21 team that won the All-Ireland Championship in 1997. He joined the Cork senior team in 1998. From his debut, Browne was ever-present in the last line of defence and made a combined total of 58 National League and Championship appearances in a career that ended in 2005. During that time he was part of three All-Ireland Championship-winning teams – in 1999, 2004 and 2005. Browne also secured three Munster Championship medals and a National Hurling League medal.

At inter-provincial level, Browne was selected to play in one championship campaign with Munster. He later became involved in team management and coaching and has served as manager of the Blackrock senior team.

== Playing career ==
=== University College Cork ===
On 2 March 1997, Browne was at left wing-back when University College Cork faced the Garda College in the final of the Fitzgibbon Cup. He collected a winners' medal following the 0-14 to 1-08 victory.

=== Blackrock ===
Browne joined the Blackrock club at a young age and played in all grades at juvenile and underage levels. On 23 October 1994, he was at centre-back when the Blackrock minor team defeated Midleton by 3-12 to 4-08 to win the Cork Premier Minor Championship.

Browne was just out of the minor grade when he was added to the Blackrock senior team. He made his first championship appearance for the team on 14 May 1995 in a 3-07 to 0-10 defeat of Avondhu.

On 1 November 1998, Browne lined out at right corner-back in his first Cork Senior Championship final. Imokilly provided the opposition, however, Blackrock were defeated by 1-10 to 1-05.

Browne lined out at left corner-back in a second successive Cork Championship final on 31 October 1999. He ended the game with his first winners' medal after the 3-17 to 0-08 defeat of University College Cork.

After surrendering their title in 2000, Browne lined out in a third Cork Championship final on 6 October 2001. Imokilly provided the opposition, however, he claimed a second winners' medal following the 4-08 to 2-07 victory. On 2 December, Browne was again at left corner-back for Blackrock's 2-14 to 0-12 defeat by Ballygunner in the Munster final.

On 15 September 2002, Browne won a third championship medal following a 1-14 to 0-12 defeat of Newtownshandrum in the Cork Championship final.

Blackrock qualified for a fifth Cork Championship final in six years on 12 October 2003. Newtownshandrum provided the opposition for the second year in succession, however, Browne, who lined out at left corner-back, ended up on the losing side by 0-17 to 1-09.

=== St Michael's ===
Browne played Gaelic football with Blackrock's sister club St Michael's. On 15 November 1998, lined out at centre-back when St. Michael's defeated St. Finbarr's by 1-11 to 0-08 to win the Cork Intermediate Championship.

=== Cork ===
==== Under-21 ====
On 17 July 1996, Browne made his first appearance for the Cork under-21 team at right corner-back in a 2-18 to 1-12 defeat of Tipperary. He won a Munster Championship medal on 24 July following a 3-16 to 2-07 defeat of Clare in the final.

Browne was eligible for the under-21 team again the following season and won a second consecutive Munster Championship medal on 30 July following a 1-11 to 0-13 defeat of Tipperary in the final. On 21 October, he won an All-Ireland medal following Cork's 3-11 to 0-13 defeat of Galway in the final.

==== Senior ====
Browne made his first appearance for the Cork senior team on 8 March 1998 in a 0-16 to 1-08 defeat of Kilkenny in the National League. On 17 May 1998, he lined out at full-back when Cork defeated Waterford by 2-14 to 0-13 in the National League final. Browne later made his first Munster Championship in 1-20 to 3-11 defeat of Limerick on 31 May.

On 4 July 1999, Browne won a Munster Championship medal after a 1-15 to 0-14 defeat of reigning champions Clare in the final. On 11 September, he was selected at left corner-back for the All-Ireland final against Kilkenny. He claimed a winners' medal following the 0-13 to 0-12 victory.

On 3 July 2000, Browne lined out at left corner-back in his second Munster final. He collected a second successive winners' medal following the 0-23 to 3-12 defeat of Tipperary.

Cork qualified for the 2002 National League final on 5 May, with Browne starting the game at centre-back. In the week leading up to the game there had been speculation that Gaelic Players Association members from both teams would stage a protest during the parade before the match with their socks down and jerseys out - offences punishable by fine under the GAA's match regulations. The Cork players went ahead with their pre-match protest before losing the final by 2-15 to 2-14. On 29 November, Browne and his 29 teammates from the Cork panel announced that they were withdrawing their services from the county in the hope of better treatment from the county board. He played a low-key role in the whole affair over the following two weeks before a settlement with the county board was reached on 13 December. Browne was subsequently dropped from the team by new manager Donal O'Grady.

Browne was recalled to the panel for the 2004 National League, however, he struggled to break on the starting fifteen. On 27 June, he was a non-playing substitute when Cork suffered a 3-16 to 1-21 defeat by Waterford in the Munster final. In spite of this defeat, Cork later qualified for the All-Ireland final against Kilkenny. Browne started the game on the bench but collected a second All-Ireland winners' medal after being introduced as a substitute in the 0-17 to 0-09 victory.

Browne won his third Munster Championship medal, again as a non-playing substitute, on 26 June 2005 after a 1-21 to 1-16 defeat of Tipperary in the final. On 11 September 2005, Cork faced Galway in the All-Ireland final for the first time since 1990. Browne remained on the bench for the entire game, however, he collected a third All-Ireland medal following the 1-21 to 1-16 victory.

=== Munster ===
Browne was selected for the Munster inter-provincial team for the 2004 Inter-provincial Championship. He made his only appearance for the team on 24 October in a 1-21 to 0-13 defeat of Leinster in the semi-final.

== Managerial career ==
=== Blackrock ===
Browne was appointed manager of the Blackrock senior team in advance of the 2013 Cork Championship. His first season in charge saw Blackrock defeat Killeagh in the opening round before exiting the championship following a 2-12 to 0-17 defeat by Ballymartle.

Browne was retained as manager for the 2014 Cork Championship. For the second season in succession Blackrock won their opening round game, this time against Na Piarsaigh, however, Browne's side exited following a second consecutive defeat by Ballymartle in the fourth round. He stepped down as manager following this defeat.

== Career statistics ==
=== Club ===
Team	Season	Cork		Munster		All-Ireland		Total	
Team	Season	Apps	Score	Apps	Score	Apps	Score	Apps	Score
Blackrock	1995	2	0-00	—		—		2	0-00
Blackrock	1996	1	0-00	—		—		1	0-00
Blackrock	1997	4	0-00	—		—		4	0-00
Blackrock	1998	4	0-00	2	0-00	—		4	0-00
Blackrock	1999	5	0-00	1	0-00	—		5	0-00
Blackrock	2000	2	0-00	—		—		2	0-00
Blackrock	2001	5	0-00	3	0-00	—		5	0-00
Blackrock	2002	5	0-00	2	0-00	—		5	0-00
Blackrock	2003	5	0-00	—		—		5	0-00
Blackrock	2004	6	0-00	—		—		6	0-00
Blackrock	2005	4	0-00	—		—		4	0-00
Blackrock	2006	3	0-00	—		—		3	0-00
Blackrock	2007	3	0-00	—		—		3	0-00
Blackrock	2008	5	0-00	—		—		5	0-00
Blackrock	2009	2	0-00	—		—		2	0-00
Career total		56	0-00	8	0-00	—		64	0-00

=== Inter-county ===
Team	Year	National League			Munster		All-Ireland		Total	
Team	Year	Division	Apps	Score	Apps	Score	Apps	Score	Apps	Score
Cork U21	1996	—			2	0-00	1	0-00	3	0-00
Cork U21	1997	—			3	0-00	2	0-00	5	0-00
Cork U21	Total	—			5	0-00	3	0-00	8	0-00
Cork	1998	Division 1B	7	0-00	2	0-00	—		9	0-00
Cork	1999	Division 1B	5	0-00	2	0-00	2	0-00	9	0-00
Cork	2000	Division 1B	5	0-00	2	0-00	1	0-00	8	0-00
Cork	2001	Division 1B	3	0-00	1	0-00	—		4	0-00
Cork	2002	Division 1B	6	0-00	1	0-00	2	0-00	9	0-00
Cork	2003	Division 1B	—		—		—		—	
Cork	2004	Division 1B	2	0-00	1	0-00	3	0-00	6	0-00
Cork	2005	Division 1B	5	0-00	0	0-00	0	0-00	5	0-00
Cork	Total		33	0-00	9	0-00	8	0-00	50	0-00
Career total			33	0-00	14	0-00	11	0-00	58	0-00

=== Inter-provincial ===
Team	Season	Railway Cup	
Team	Season	Apps	Score
Munster	2004	1	0-00
Career total		1	0-00

== Honours ==
University College Cork

- Fitzgibbon Cup (1): 1997

Blackrock

- Cork Senior Hurling Championship (3): 1999, 2001 (c), 2002 (c)
- Cork Premier Minor Hurling Championship (1): 1994

St Michael's

- Cork Intermediate Football Championship (1): 1998

Cork

- All-Ireland Senior Hurling Championship (3): 1999, 2004, 2005
- Munster Senior Hurling Championship (3): 1999, 2000, 2005
- National Hurling League (1): 1998
- All-Ireland Under-21 Hurling Championship (1): 1997
- Munster Under-21 Hurling Championship (2): 1996, 1997
