= Mickey O'Connell =

Irish hurler and coach

Mickey O’Connell
Personal information
- Native name: Micheal Ó Conaill (Irish)
- Born: January 1977 (age 49) Limerick, Ireland
- Occupation: Customer services
- Height: 6 ft 0 in (183 cm)

Sport
- Sport: Hurling
- Position: Midfield
Club
Years	Club	Apps (scores)
1995–2009	Midleton	35 (2–174)
Club titles
- Cork titles: 0
Inter-county*
Years	County	Apps (scores)
1998–2007	Cork	19 (0–26)
Inter-county titles
- Munster titles: 3
- All-Irelands: 2
- NHL: 1
- All Stars: 0
- *Inter County team apps and scores correct as of 23:02, 4 August 2014.

Mickey O'Connell (born January 1977) is an Irish hurling coach and hurler who played for Cork Senior Championship club Midleton. He played for the Cork senior hurling team at various times over a ten-year period, during which time he usually lined out at midfield.

O'Connell began his hurling career at club level with Midleton. He broke onto the club's senior team as an 18-year-old in 1995 and immediately became a regular member of the starting fifteen. O'Connell made 35 championship appearances at senior level for the club before his retirement in 2009.

At inter-county level, O'Connell was part of the successful Cork minor team that won the All-Ireland Championship in 1995 before later winning back-to-back All-Ireland Championships with the under-21 team in 1997 and 1998. He joined the Cork senior team in 1998. From his debut, O'Connell was a regular at midfield and made a combined total of 43 National League and Championship appearances in a career that ended with his last appearance in 2007. During that time he was part of two All-Ireland Championship-winning teams – in 1999 and 2004. O'Connell also secured three Munster Championship medals and a National Hurling League medal.

At inter-provincial level, O'Connell was selected to play in one championship campaign with Munster, however, he ended his career without a Railway Cup medal.

== Playing career ==
=== Midleton CBS ===
O'Connell played in all grades of hurling during his secondary schooling at Midleton CBS Secondary School before joining the college's senior hurling side. On 27 March 1994, he lined out at left wing-forward when Midleton CBS suffered a 1–09 to 0–04 defeat by the North Monastery in the Harty Cup final.

While the 1994 Harty Cup final was supposed to be his last game, O'Connell was one of 11 Midleton CBS players who repeated the Leaving Cert in an effort to claim the title. On 26 March 1995, he lined out at left wing-forward in a second successive Harty Cup final. He ended the game with a winners' medal after scoring eight points in the 3–18 to 3–05 defeat of Lismore CBS. On 30 April, scored three points from left wing-forward in a 5–10 to 3–05 All-Ireland final defeat by St. Raphael's College from Loughrea.

=== Midleton ===
O'Connell joined the Midleton club at a young age and played in all grades at juvenile and underage levels. He joined the club's senior team as an 18-year-old during the 1995 Cork Senior Championship and made his first appearance on 25 June in a 1–13 to 0–11 defeat of Bishopstown.

=== Cork ===
==== Minor and under-21 ====
O'Connell first played for Cork when he was selected for the minor team during the 1995 Munster Championship. He made his first appearance for the team on 28 June when he scored six points from left wing-forward in a 2–14 to 1–03 defeat of Limerick. O'Connell won a Munster Championship medal on 9 July following a 3–18 to 0–10 defeat of Waterford. On 3 September he lined out at left wing-forward in the All-Ireland final against Kilkenny and collected a winners' medal after scoring 1–03 in the 2–10 to 1–02 victory.

On 17 July 1996, O'Connell made his first appearance for the Cork under-21 team in a 2–18 to 1–12 defeat of Tipperary. He won a Munster Championship medal on 24 July after scoring four points from right wing-forward in a 3–16 to 2–07 defeat of Clare in the final.

O'Connell won a second consecutive Munster Championship medal on 30 July after scoring six points in a 1–11 to 0–13 defeat of Tipperary in the final. On 21 October, he won an All-Ireland from left wing-forward medal following Cork's 3–11 to 0–13 defeat of Galway in the final.

Cork dominated the championship again in 1998, with O'Connell winning a third successive Munster Championship medal on 23 August following a 3–18 to 1–10 defeat of Tipperary in the final. He won a second successive All-Ireland medal on 20 September after scoring seven points from left wing-forward in Cork's 2–15 to 2–10 defeat of Galway in the final. It was O'Connell's last game in the grade.

==== Senior ====
O'Connell joined the Cork senior team during the 1998 National League and made his first appearance for the team on 8 March in a 0–16 to 1–08 defeat of Kilkenny. On 17 May, he won a National Hurling League medal as a non-playing substitute following a 2–14 to 0–13 defeat of Waterford in the final. O'Connell was later an unused substitute for Cork during the 1998 Munster Championship and was subsequently dropped from the team.

Impressive form at club level earned a recall for O'Connell. He made his championship debut on 13 June and scored eight points from midfield in a 0–24 to 1–15 defeat of Waterford. On 4 July, he won a Munster Championship medal after scoring five points in a 1–15 to 0–14 defeat of reigning champions Clare in the final. On 11 September, O'Connell was at midfield for the All-Ireland final against Kilkenny. He was held scoreless but claimed a winners' medal following the 0–12 to 0–11 victory.

On 3 July 2000, O'Connell lined out in his second Munster final. He was held scoreless throughout the game but collected a second successive winners' medal following a 0–23 to 3–12 defeat of Tipperary.

After being dropped for the 2002 season, O'Connell was again recalled to the panel and lined out in his third Munster final on 29 June 2003. Cork won the game by 3–16 to 3–12 with O'Connell winning his third Munster Championship medal. On 14 September, he was at midfield for Cork's 1–14 to 1–11 All-Ireland final defeat by Kilkenny.

O'Connell made a number of appearances throughout the 2004 season. On 12 September, he won a second All-Ireland medal as a non-playing substitute following a 0–17 to 0–09 defeat of Kilkenny in All-Ireland final against Kilkenny. O'Connell later opted out of the Cork senior hurling panel after informing the management team that he was unavailable for selection for the 2005 season.

O'Connell was invited back to the Cork team by manager John Allen at the start of the 2006 season. He made just two appearances during the National League and failed to secure a place on the championship panel.

O'Connell was added to the Cork panel for the 2007 National League, however, he made no appearances throughout the campaign and brought his inter-county career to an end shortly afterwards.

=== Munster ===
O'Connell was selected for the Munster inter-provincial team during the 1999 Railway Cup. On 25 November, he was at midfield when Munster suffered a 2–13 to 1–15 defeat by Connacht in the final.

== Career statistics ==
=== Club ===
Team	Year	Cork SHC	
Team	Year	Apps	Score
Midleton	1995	2	0–02
Midleton	1996	1	0–02
Midleton	1997	1	0–00
Midleton	1998	1	1–04
Midleton	1999	1	0–10
Midleton	2000	2	1–12
Midleton	2001	2	0–13
Midleton	2002	2	0–09
Midleton	2003	5	0–28
Midleton	2004	3	0–08
Midleton	2005	2	0–13
Midleton	2006	4	0–34
Midleton	2007	3	0–11
Midleton	2008	2	0–13
Midleton	2009	4	0–15
Career total		35	2–174

=== Inter-county ===
Team	Year	National League			Munster		All-Ireland		Total	
Team	Year	Division	Apps	Score	Apps	Score	Apps	Score	Apps	Score
Cork Minor	1995	—			2	0–13	2	1–03	4	1–16
Cork Minor	Total	—			2	0–13	2	1–03	4	1–16
Cork U21	1996	—			2	0–06	1	0–04	3	0–10
Cork U21	1997	—			2	0–13	2	0–09	4	0–22
Cork U21	1998	—			3	0–06	2	0–11	5	0–17
Cork U21	Total	—			7	0–25	5	0–24	12	0–49
Cork	1998	Division 1B	4	0–03	0	0–00	—		4	0–03
Cork	1999	Division 1B	—		2	0–13	2	0–01	4	0–14
Cork	2000	Division 1B	6	0–11	3	0–01	1	0–00	10	0–12
Cork	2001	Division 1B	5	0–04	0	0–00	—		5	0–04
Cork	2002	Division 1B	—		—		—		—	
Cork	2003	Division 1B	6	0–06	2	0–01	3	0–03	11	0–10
Cork	2004	Division 1B	2	0–01	2	0–03	3	0–04	7	0–08
Cork	2005	Division 1B	—		—		—		—	
Cork	2006	Division 1A	2	0–03	—		—		2	0–03
Cork	2007	Division 1A	0	0–00	—		—		0	0–00
Cork	Total		25	0–28	9	0–18	9	0–08	43	0–54
Career total			25	0–28	18	0–56	16	1–35	59	1–119

== Honours ==
Midleton CBS

- Dr Harty Cup (1): 1995

Cork

- All-Ireland Senior Hurling Championship (2): 1999, 2004
- Munster Senior Hurling Championship (5): 1999, 2000, 2003
- National Hurling League (1): 1998
- All-Ireland Under-21 Hurling Championship (2): 1997, 1998
- Munster Under-21 Hurling Championship (3): 1996, 1997, 1998
- All-Ireland Minor Hurling Championship (1): 1995
- Munster Minor Hurling Championship (1): 1995
