= Austin Walsh (hurler) =

Irish hurler

Personal information
- Native name: Áistín Breathnach (Irish)
- Born: 1977 (age 48–49) Kildorrery, County Cork, Ireland
- Height: 6 ft 0 in (183 cm)

Sport
- Sport: Hurling
- Position: Midfield
Club
- Years: Club
- Kildorrery
Inter-county*
Years	County	Apps (scores)
1998	Cork	0 (0-00)
Inter-county titles
- Munster titles: 7
- All-Irelands: 4
- NHL: 1
- All Stars: 0
- *Inter County team apps and scores correct as of 17:01, 7 August 2014.

Austin Walsh (born 1977) is an Irish retired hurler who played as a midfielder for the Cork senior team.

Born in Kildorrery, County Cork, Walsh first arrived on the inter-county scene at the age of sixteen when he first linked up with the Cork minor team, before later joining the under-21 side. He joined the senior panel during the 1998 championship. Walsh won one National Hurling League medal as a non-playing substitute.

At club level Walsh enjoyed a lengthy career with Kildorrery.

== Honours ==
=== Team ===
Cork

- National Hurling League (1): 1998 (sub)
- All-Ireland Intermediate Hurling Championship (1): 1997
- Munster Intermediate Hurling Championship (2): 1997
- All-Ireland Under-21 Hurling Championship (2): 1997, 1998
- Munster Under-21 Hurling Championship (3): 1996 (sub), 1997, 1998
- All-Ireland Minor Hurling Championship (1): 1995
- Munster Minor Hurling Championship (2): 1994, 1995
