= Seánie O'Farrell =

Irish hurler

Personal information
- Native name: Seánie Ó Fearghail (Irish)
- Born: 1977 (age 48–49) Carrigtwohill, County Cork, Ireland

Sport
- Sport: Hurling
- Position: Right corner-forward
Club
- Years: Club
- Carrigtwohill
Club titles
- Cork titles: 3
Inter-county*
Years	County	Apps (scores)
1998/1999	Cork	2 (0-3)
Inter-county titles
- Munster titles: 1
- All-Irelands: 1
- NHL: 1
- All Stars: 0
- *Inter County team apps and scores correct as of 18:28, 7 August 2014.

Seánie O'Farrell (born 1977) is an Irish retired hurler who played as a right corner-forward for the Cork senior team.

Born in Carrigtwohill, County Cork, O'Farrell first arrived on the inter-county scene at the age of seventeen when he first linked up with the Cork minor team, before later joining the under-21 side. He joined the senior panel during the 1998 National Hurling League. O'Farrell won one National Hurling League medal.

At club level O'Farrell is a three-time championship medallist with Imokilly GAA in 1997 and 1998 and in 2011 with Carrigtwohill GAA.

== Honours ==
=== Team ===
Carrigtwohill

- Cork Senior Hurling Championship (1): 2011

Cork

- National Hurling League (1): 1998
- All-Ireland Intermediate Hurling Championship (1): 1997
- All-Ireland Under-21 Hurling Championship (2): 1997, 1998
- Munster Under-21 Hurling Championship (2): 1997, 1998
- All-Ireland Minor Hurling Championship (1): 1995
- Munster Minor Hurling Championship (1): 1995
