= Brian O'Driscoll (hurler) =

Irish hurler

Personal information
- Native name: Briain Ó Drisceoil (Irish)
- Born: 1976 (age 49–50) Killavullen, County Cork, Ireland

Sport
- Sport: Hurling
- Position: Right corner-forward
Clubs
- Years: Club
- 1993-2014 1993-2002 2003-2009: Killavullen; Avondhu; St. Finbarr's
Club titles
- Cork titles: 1
Inter-county*
| Years | County | Apps (scores) |
| 1997 | Cork | 0 (0-00) |
Inter-county titles
- Munster titles: 0
- All-Irelands: 0
- NHL: 1
- All Stars: 0
- *Inter County team apps and scores correct as of 18:56, 7 August 2014.

Brian O'Driscoll (born 1976) is an Irish hurler who played as a right wing-forward for the Cork senior team.

Born in Killavullen, County Cork, O'Driscoll first arrived on the inter-county scene at the age of seventeen when he first linked up with the Cork minor team, before later joining the under-21 and intermediate sides. He joined the senior panel during the 1997 championship.

At club hurling level O'Driscoll is a one-time championship medallist with divisional side Avondhu. He also won several football championship medals with Killavullen. He concluded his hurling career with St. Finbarr's.

== Honours ==
=== Team ===
Killavullen

- Cork Junior Football Championship (1): 2000

Avondhu

- Cork Senior Hurling Championship (1): 1996

Cork

- All-Ireland Intermediate Hurling Championship (1): 1997
- Munster Intermediate Hurling Championship (2): 1997, 1999
- All-Ireland Under-21 Hurling Championship (1): 1997
- Munster Under-21 Hurling Championship (2): 1996, 1997
- Munster Minor Hurling Championship (1): 1994
