= Danny Murphy (hurler) =

Irish hurler

Personal information
- Native name: Dónall Ó Murchú (Irish)
- Born: 6 January 1977 (age 49) Ballincollig, County Cork, Ireland
- Occupation: Engineer
- Height: 5 ft 11 in (180 cm)

Sport
- Sport: Hurling
- Position: Midfield
Clubs
- Years: Club
- 1995-2007 1995-1998 2003 2008-2010: Ballincollig → University College Cork → Muskerry; Barryroe
Club titles
- Cork titles: 0
College
- Years: College
- 1994-1998: University College Cork
College titles
- Fitzgibbon titles: 3
Inter-county
Years	County	Apps (scores)
1997-1999	Cork	1 (0-00)
Inter-county titles
- Munster titles: 1
- All-Irelands: 1
- NHL: 1
- All Stars: 0

Daniel Murphy (born 6 January 1977) is an Irish hurling coach and former player. At club level, he played with Ballincollig, divisional side Muskerry and at inter-county level with the Cork senior hurling team.

== Playing career ==
Murphy first played hurling at juvenile and underage levels with Ballincollig before progressing to adult level in 1995. After losing that year's Cork IHC final to Kilbrittain, Murphy later captained the team to the IHC title in 1999 after a 1-14 to 2-09 win over Blarney. He ended his club career with Barryroe.

During his studies at University College Cork (UCC), Murphy also played hurling for the college's senior team. He was part of three successive Fitzgibbon Cup-winning teams between 1996 and 1998. Murphy also lined out with UCC in the Cork SHC, as well as playing with divisional side Muskerry.

At inter-county level, Murphy first appeared for Cork as part of the minor team that beat Kilkenny to win the All-Ireland MHC title in 1995. He immediately progressed to the under-21 team and captained Cork to the All-Ireland U21HC title in 1997, in what was their 100th All-Ireland title overall. Murphy was again team captain when Cork retained the All-Ireland U21HC title in 1998.

Murphy also added an All-Ireland IHC medal to his collection in 1997, before progressing to the senior team. He was part of the team that won the National Hurling League title in 1998. Murphy later claimed a Munster SHC medal, before being a panel member when Cork beat Kilkenny in the 1999 All-Ireland final.

== Coaching career ==
In retirement from playing, Murphy has become involved in coaching and team management at all levels. He has coached various underage teams with the Ibane Gaels amalgamation and served as Barryroe junior team manager in 2023.

== Personal life ==
Murphy's wife, Cora Keohane, won All-Ireland SCC medals as goalkeeper with the Cork senior camogie team in 1997 and 1998.

== Honours ==
University College Cork

- Fitzgibbon Cup: 1996, 1997, 1998

Ballincollig

- Cork Intermediate Hurling Championship: 1999 (c)

Cork

- All-Ireland Senior Hurling Championship: 1999
- Munster Senior Hurling Championship: 1999
- National Hurling League: 1998
- All-Ireland Intermediate Hurling Championship: 1997
- Munster Intermediate Hurling Championship: 1997
- All-Ireland Under-21 Hurling Championship: 1997 (c), 1998 (c)
- Munster Under-21 Hurling Championship: 1996, 1997 (c), 1998 (c)
- All-Ireland Minor Hurling Championship: 1995
- Munster Minor Hurling Championship: 1995

Achievements
Preceded by Peter Huban; Galway)	All-Ireland Under-21 Hurling Final winning captain 1998-1999	Succeeded by Noel Hickey (Kilkenny)
