= Brian O'Keeffe =

Irish hurler (born 1977)

Personal information
- Native name: Briain Ó Cuív (Irish)
- Born: 1978 (age 47–48) Blackrock, Cork, Ireland

Sport
- Sport: Hurling
- Position: Right corner-forward
Club
- Years: Club
- Blackrock
Club titles
- Cork titles: 3
Inter-county*
Years	County	Apps (scores)
2001-2004	Cork	1 (0-1)
Inter-county titles
- Munster titles: 0
- All-Irelands: 0
- NHL: 0
- All Stars: 0
- *Inter County team apps and scores correct as of 01:31, 6 August 2014.

Brian O'Keeffe (born 1977) is an Irish hurler who played as a right corner-forward for the Cork senior team.

Born in Blackrock, Cork, O'Keeffe first arrived on the inter-county scene at the age of seventeen when he first linked up with the Cork minor team, before later joining the under-21 side. He joined the senior panel during the 2001 championship. O'Keeffe went on to play a bit part for Cork over the next few years.

At club level O'Keeffe is a three-time championship medallist with Blackrock.

Throughout his career Prendergast made just one championship appearance for Cork. He retired form inter-county hurling following the conclusion of the 2002 championship.

== Honours ==
=== Team ===
Blackrock

- Cork Senior Hurling Championship (3): 1999, 2001, 2002

Cork

- All-Ireland Under-21 Hurling Championship (2): 1997 (sub), 1998
- Munster Under-21 Hurling Championship (2): 1997, 1998
- All-Ireland Minor Hurling Championship (1): 1995 (c)
- Munster Minor Hurling Championship (1): 1995 (c)

Achievements
Preceded by Greg Kennedy (Galway)	All-Ireland Minor Hurling Final winning captain 1995	Succeeded by William Maher (Tipperary)
