= Bertie Óg Murphy =

Irish hurler and Gaelic footballer

Personal information
- Native name: Parthalán Óg Ó Murchú (Irish)
- Born: 16 October 1954 (age 72) Glanmire, County Cork, Ireland
- Occupation: School principal
- Height: 5 ft 10 in (178 cm)

Sport
- Sport: Hurling
- Position: Right wing-forward
Club
- Years: Club
- Sarsfields
Club titles
- Cork titles: 0
Inter-county*
Years	County	Apps (scores)
1975-1984	Cork	11 (1-28)
Inter-county titles
- Munster titles: 4
- All-Irelands: 2
- NHL: 0
- All Stars: 0
- *Inter County team apps and scores correct as of 22:43, 21 June 2016.

Bertie Óg Murphy (born 16 October 1954) is an Irish former hurling manager and former player who enjoyed a successful career as a right wing-forward with the Cork senior team.

Born in Glanmire, County Cork, Murphy was introduced to hurling by his father, the long-serving secretary of the local club team, before later coming to prominence at underage levels with the Sarsfields club. He subsequently joined the Sarsfields senior team and was a one-time championship runner-up.

Murphy made his debut on the inter-county scene at the age of seventeen when he first linked up with the Cork minor team. An All-Ireland runner-up in this grade, he later ended up as an All-Ireland runner-up with the under-21 team. His senior debut came during the 1975-76 league. He went on to play a key role for Cork in attack during a successful era, and won two All-Ireland medals and four Munster medals. He was an All-Ireland runner-up on two occasions.

Throughout his inter-county career Murphy made 11 championship appearances. He retired from inter-county hurling following the conclusion of the 1984 championship.

After being involved in team management and coaching in all grades at club level with Sarsfields, Murphy guided the Cork under-21 team to back-to-back All-Ireland titles. He later enjoyed an unsuccessful one-season spell as manager of the Cork senior team from 2001 to 2002. Murphy returned as Sarsfields manager in 2008 and guided the club to its first championship title in 51 years.

== Playing career ==
=== Club ===
Murphy played his club hurling with the Sarsfields club in Glanmire and enjoyed some success. He won a county under-21 championship winners' medal in 1975 after Sarsfields defeated Bandon by 6-3 to 1-7. At this time Murphy was also a member of the club's senior team and spent the best part of twenty years playing in the forwards. In 1988 he played in his only county final, however, Glen Rovers were victorious on that occasion.

=== Minor & under-21 ===
Murphy first came to prominence as a dual player on the inter-county scene with Cork in the early 1970s. He first tasted success in 1972, when he captured a Munster minor hurling title following a 4-11 to 0-3 trouncing of Limerick. The subsequent All-Ireland final saw Cork take on Kilkenny. A high-scoring game ensued, however, at the final whistle Cork were defeated by 8-7 to 3-9.

1972 also saw Murphy enjoy much success with the Cork minor footballers. He picked up a Munster title in this code as well as Cork defeated arch-rivals Kerry by 2-14 to 1-14. An All-Ireland final appearance later beckoned with Tyrone providing the opposition. The game was a close affair, however, Cork were the winners by 3-11 to 2-11. This victory gave Murphy an All-Ireland minor football winners’ medal and was some consolation for losing the hurling decider two weeks earlier.

By 1975 Murphy joined Cork's under-21 hurling team. He subsequently captured his first Munster under-21 winners’ title following a 3-12 to 2-6 win over Limerick. The subsequent All-Ireland final pitted Cork against fierce rivals Kilkenny. 'The Cats' were the overwhelming winners on that occasion by 5-13 to 2-9.

=== Senior ===
Murphy subsequently joined the Cork senior team and made his debut in the Munster semi-final victory over Tipperary in 1976. It was the beginning of a glorious era for Cork, however, Murphy found it difficult to break onto the starting fifteen. He had a difficult time on the periphery.

After some years in the wilderness, Cork bounced back in 1982 and qualified for the All-Ireland final. Following an impressive provincial championship campaign 'the Rebels' were the red-hot favourites, however, arch-rivals Kilkenny surprised. Murphy came on as a substitute in that game, however, Christy Heffernan scored two goals in a forty-second spell just before the interval to take the wind out of Cork's sails. Ger Fennelly got a third goal within eight minutes of the restart, giving Kilkenny a 3-18 to 1-15 victory.

In 1983, Murphy secured a more permanent place on the team as Cork’s run of provincial success continued. He won a Munster winners' medal that year as Cork trounced Waterford for the second consecutive year. The subsequent All-Ireland final pitted Cork against Kilkenny for the second consecutive year also. ‘The Cats’ used a strong wind to dominate the opening half and built up a strong lead. Cork came storming back with goals by Tomás Mulcahy and Seánie O'Leary, however, at the full-time whistle Kilkenny had won by 2-14 to 2-12.

Murphy remained on the Cork senior hurling panel for another while and won an All-Ireland medal as a non-playing substitute in 1984 following Cork's championship decider defeat of Offaly.

== Managerial career ==
Murphy first tried his hand at coaching with the Sarsfield's juveniles just as his playing career was coming to an end. He guided the club's young hurlers to back-to-back under-14 'A' hurling championship titles and a Féile na nGael title in the early 1990s.

In the late 1990s, Murphy first tasted managerial success on the inter-county scene when he guided the Cork under-21 team to back-to-back All-Ireland medals in 1997 and 1998. He also served as a selector under Jimmy Barry-Murphy when he guided Cork to a senior All-Ireland victory in 1999. Murphy became manager of the Cork senior hurlers in 2002. He had an unsuccessful tenure as coach which culminated in his resignation after just one season in charge as the players went on strike due to the authoritarian nature of the Cork County Board. In his one season in charge Cork narrowly lost to Kilkenny in the National Hurling League Final, and also narrowly lost to Waterford in their opening Munster Championship game.

Due to the new backdoor structure introduced for the 2002 All Ireland Senior Hurling Championship, Cork beat Limerick in their first game of the new backdoor/qualifier era before suffering an embarrassing defeat to Galway in their next qualifying game. Bertie Og Murphy's sole year in charge of the Cork team was plagued by disputes between the players and county board officials. Cork went on to reach the next four all Ireland finals winning two, narrowly losing another two finals and also winning three Munster titles.

== Career statistics ==
=== Player ===
Team	Year	Munster		All-Ireland		Total	
Team	Year	Apps	Score	Apps	Score	Apps	Score
Cork	1976	1	0–00	0	0–00	1	0–00
Cork	1981	1	0–00	0	0–00	1	0–00
Cork	1982	2	0–03	1	0–00	3	0–03
Cork	1983	3	0–13	2	1-12	5	1-25
Cork	1984	0	0–00	1	0–00	1	0–00
Total		7	0-16	4	1-12	11	1-28

=== Manager ===
Team	From	To	National League				Munster				All-Ireland				Total				
Team	From	To	G	W	D	L	G	W	D	L	G	W	D	L	G	W	D	L	Win %
Cork	19 September 2001	25 September 2002	7	5	1	1	1	0	0	1	2	1	0	1	10	6	1	3	60

== Honours ==
=== Player ===
Sarsfields

- Cork Under-21 Hurling Championship (1): 1975

Cork

- All-Ireland Senior Hurling Championship (2): 1976 (sub), 1984 (sub)
- Munster Senior Hurling Championship (4): 1976 (sub), 1982 (sub), 1983, 1984 (sub)
- Munster Under-21 Hurling Championship (1): 1975
- All-Ireland Minor Football Championship (1): 1972
- Munster Minor Football Championship (1): 1972
- Munster Minor Hurling Championship (1): 1972

=== Selector ===
Cork

- Munster Senior Hurling Championship (1): 2000

=== Manager ===
Sarsfields

- Cork Senior Hurling Championship (1): 2008

Cork

- All-Ireland Under-21 Hurling Championship (2): 1997, 1998
- Munster Under-21 Hurling Championship (3): 1996, 1997, 1998

Achievements
Preceded by Cyril Farrell (Galway)	All-Ireland Under-21 Hurling Final winning manager 1997-1998	Succeeded by Richie Power (Kilkenny)
Sporting positions
Preceded by Tom Cashman	Cork Senior Hurling Manager; 2001-2002	Succeeded by Dónal O'Grady
