= 1994–95 Harty Cup =

Hurling tournament

1994–95 Dr Harty Cup
- Dates: 19 October 1995 – 26 March 1995
- Teams: 16
- Champions: Midleton CBS (2nd title); Donal Óg Cusack (captain)
- Runners-up: Lismore CBS; Stuart Barry (captain)

Tournament statistics
- Matches played: 15
- Goals scored: 63 (4.2 per match)
- Points scored: 282 (18.8 per match)
- Top scorer(s): Dan Shanahan (6-13); Dave Bennett (3-22)

The 1994–95 Harty Cup was the 75th staging of the Harty Cup since its establishment in hurling by the Munster Council of Gaelic Athletic Association in 1918. The competition ran from 19 October 1995 to 26 March 1995.

North Monastery unsuccessfully defended its title, in the semi-finals losing to Lismore CBS .

Midleton CBS won their second successive Harty Cup title overall in the Harty Cup final on 26 March 1995 at Páirc Mac Gearailt in Fermoy, 3–18 to 3–05, losing against Lismore CBS, in what was their first ever meeting in a final and first title since 1988.

Lismore CBS's Dan Shanahan and Dave Bennett were the top scorers.

== Results ==
=== First round ===
19 October 1994 First round	Limerick CBS	1-06 - 3-17	CBS Charleville	Ballyagran Grounds
	P Collins 1-0, A Purcell 0-3, B Foley 0-2, K Mullane 0-1.		D Ronan 0-9, B Foley 2-1, N Ronan 1-3, G Cremin 0-2, M Gammell 0-1, T Hourigan 0-1.

19 October 1994 First round	Abbey CBS	2-03 - 2-14	North Monastery	Páirc Mac Gearailt
	P McEvoy 1-2, B McGuire 1-0, B O'Riordan 0-1;		J Anderson 2-2, A Coughlan 0-5, C O'Sullivan 0-3, J Buckley 0-2, S O'Callaghan 0-1, S Óg Ó hAilpín 0-1.

19 October 1994 First round	Scarriff Community School	1-03 - 1-16	St Colman's College	Seán Treacy Memorial Park
	M long 1-0, J Horan 0-2, B O'Halloran 0-1.		T McCarthy 0-7, T O'Connor 0-4, P Mullins 1-0, D Barry 0-2, W O'Donoghue 0-1, T Hickey 0-1, O Fenton 0-1.

19 October 1994 First round	Hamilton High School	1-05 - 3-13	Thurles CBS	Moore Park
	A Buckley 1-0, J Hurley 0-2, B Murphy 0-1, K Collins 0-1, D Nolan 0-1.		J Enright 0-10, J Kavanagh 2-1, V Coughlan 1-0, S Dwyer 0-2.

19 October 1994 First round	Our Lady's Secondary School	1-09 - 3-14	Midleton CBS	The Park
	K Dunne 1-2, D Kelly 0-3, A Doyle 0-2, D Owens 0-1, PJ Sweeney 0-1.		E O'Flynn 3-0, M O'Connell 0-8, J Deane 0-2, P Mullaney 0-2, C Lehane 0-1, A Kelleher 0-1.

19 October 1994 First round	Coláiste Chríost Rí	3-03 - 7-15	Nenagh CBS	Páirc na nGael
	R Butler 1-0, E Fitzgerald 1-0, G Keane 1-0, J Doolin 0-3.		P Ryan 3-1, J Slattery 3-1, M O'Leary 0-6, M Bevan 1-2, J Moloney 0-4, C Martin 0-1.

19 October 1994 First round	St Finbarr's College	3-15 - 2-11	St Flannan's College	Dr Mannix Sportsfield
	R Gantley 1-2, M Tobin 1-0, E Bradley 1-0, F Flynn 0-1, C Cronin 0-1, F Kelly 0-1.		J Kingston 1-2, L Harte 1-1, J Forrestal 0-4, G Fitzgerald 0-3, D Murphy 0-1.

26 October 1994 First round	Lismore CBS	4-15 - 1-05	De La Salle College Waterford	Fraher Field
	D Bennett 1-6, D Shanahan 1-5, S Barry 1-0, M Shanahan 1-0, E Bennett 0-3, S Curley 0-1.		M Sweeney 0-4, R Kelly 1-0, S O'Keeffe 0-1.

=== Quarter-finals ===
16 November 1994 Quarter-final	Lismore CBS	3-16 - 1-13	CBS Charleville	Páirc Mac Gearailt
	D Bennett 0-8, M Shanahan 2-1, D Shanahan 1-3, E Bennett 0-2, S Curley 0-1, A Whelan 0-1.		D Ronan 1-8, N Ronan 0-1, M Gammell 0-1, S O'Dwyer 0-1, B Foley 0-1, S O'Halloran 0-1.

16 November 1994 Quarter-final	North Monastery	3-06 - 2-06	St Colman's College	Mallow Grounds
	A Coughlan 1-3, C O'Sullivan 1-1, K Goulding 1-0, B Hennebry 0-1.		T Hickey 1-2, T McCarthy 0-4, P Mullins 1-0.

16 November 1994 Quarter-final	Thurles CBS	0-06 - 1-05	Midleton CBS Secondary School	Mitchlestown Grounds
	J Enright 0-5, A Kirby 0-1.		J Deane 1-4, M O'Connell 0-1.

16 November 1994 Quarter-final	Nenagh CBS	0-05 - 2-10	St Flannan's College	Cappamore Grounds
	M O'Leary 0-4, P Ryan 0-1.		F Flynn 1-4, A Markham 1-2, C Mullen 0-2, M Tobin 0-2.

=== Semi-finals ===
19 February 1995 Semi-final	Midleton CBS	1-06 - 0-03	St Flannan's College	Dr Mannix Sportsfield
	M O'Connell 1-3, P Mullaney 0-2, M Dunne 0-1.		M Tobin 0-1, R Gantley 0-1, F O'Flynn 0-1.

15 March 1995 Semi-final	Lismore CBS	4-11 - 2-08	North Monastery	Páirc Mac Gearailt
	D Bennetts 2-4, D Shanahan 1-5, S Barry 1-0, M Shanahan 0-1, E Bennett 0-1.		D McAuliffe 1-1, J Anderson 1-0, C O'Sullivan 0-2, N Hennebry 0-1, M O'Driscoll 0-1, K O'Callaghan 0-1, A Coughlan 0-1, S Óg Ó hAilpín 0-1.

=== Final ===
26 March 1995 Final	Midleton CBS	3-18 - 3-05	Lismore CBS	Páirc Mac Gearailt
	J Deane 2-2, P Mullaney 1-5, M O'Connell 0-8, C Lehane 0-1, M Dunne 0-1, P Walsh 0-1.		D Shanahan 3-0, D Bennett 0-4, S Barry 0-1.	Referee: J McDonnell (Roscrea)

== Statistics ==
=== Top scorers ===
Rank	Player	County	Tally	Total	Matches	Average
1	Dan Shanahan	Lismore CBS	6-13	31	4	7.75
1	Dave Bennett	Lismore CBS	3-22	31	4	7.75
3	Mickey O'Connell	Midleton CBS	1-20	23	4	5.75
4	Darren Ronan	CBS Charleville	1-17	20	2	10.00
5	Joe Deane	Midleton CBS	3-08	17	4	4.25
6	Johnny Enright	Thurles CBS	0-15	15	2	7.50
7	Adrian Coughlan	North Monastery	1-09	12	3	4.00
7	Pat Mullaney	Midleton CBS	1-09	12	4	3.00
9	John Anderson	North Monastery	3-02	11	3	3.66
9	Paul Ryan	Nenagh CBS	3-02	11	2	5.50
9	Timmy McCarthy	St Colman's College	0-11	11	2	5.50
