= Richard Browne (hurler) =

Irish hurler

Personal information
- Native name: Ristéard de Brun (Irish)
- Born: 1962 (age 63–64) Blackrock, County Cork, Ireland
- Occupation: Dentist
- Height: 6 ft 3 in (191 cm)

Sport
- Sport: Hurling
- Position: Full-back
Club
- Years: Club
- Blackrock
Club titles
- Cork titles: 1
College
- Years: College
- 1983-1985: University College Cork
College titles
- Fitzgibbon titles: 2
Inter-county*
Years	County	Apps (scores)
1986-1991	Cork	14 (0-00)
Inter-county titles
- Munster titles: 0
- All-Irelands: 1
- NHL: 0
- All Stars: 0
- *Inter County team apps and scores correct as of 14:50, 23 May 2015.

Richard Browne (born 1962) is an Irish retired hurler who played as a full-back for the Cork senior team.

Born in Blackrock, County Cork, Browne first played competitive hurling in his youth. He arrived on the inter-county scene at the age of twenty when he first linked up with the Cork under-21 team. He made his senior debut during the 1986 championship. Browne subsequently became a regular member of the starting fifteen and won one All-Ireland medal.

At club level Browne is a one-time championship medallist with Blackrock.

Browne's brothers, Alan and John, also enjoyed All-Ireland success with Cork.

Throughout his career Browne made 14 championship appearances. His retirement came following the conclusion of the 1991 championship.

== Honours ==
=== Team ===
Blackrock

- Cork Senior Hurling Championship (1): 1985

University College Cork

- Fitzgibbon Cup (2): 1984, 1985

Cork

- All-Ireland Senior Hurling Championship (1): 1986
- Munster Senior Hurling Championship (1): 1986
- National Hurling League (2): 1979–80, 1990–81
