= 2004 Cork Senior Hurling Championship =

Annual hurling competition season

- Dates: 2 May 2004 – 31 October 2004
- Teams: 23
- Sponsor: Permanent TSB
- Champions: Na Piarsaigh (3rd title); Mark Prendergast (captain); Joe O'Leary (manager)
- Runners-up: Cloyne; Donal Óg Cusack (captain); Thomas O'Brien (manager)

Tournament statistics
- Matches played: 33
- Top scorer(s): John Anderson (0-47)

The 2004 Cork Senior Hurling Championship was the 116th staging of the Cork Senior Hurling Championship since its establishment by the Cork County Board in 1887. The draw for the 2004 fixtures took place on 14 December 2003. The championship began on 2 May 2004 and ended on 31 October 2004.

Newtownshandrum were the defending champions, however, they were defeated by Cloyne in the semi-final stage.

On 31 October 2004, Na Piarsaigh won the championship following a 0–17 to 0–10 defeat of Cloyne in the final. This was their third championship title overall and their first in nine championship seasons.

== Team changes ==
=== To Championship ===
Promoted from the Cork Intermediate Hurling Championship

- Bride Rovers

== Results ==
=== Round 1 ===
| 1 May 2004 Round 1 | Bride Rovers | 2-07 - 1-12 | Na Piarsaigh | Páirc Mac Gearailt, Fermoy |
| | B Murphy 1-1, D Fitzgerald 1-0, B Johnson 0-3, T Broderick 0-1, B Walsh 0-1, R Cahill 0-1. | | J Gardiner 0-5, A Ó hAilpín 1-0, S O'Sullivan 0-2, D Walsh 0-2, D Gardiner 0-1, R McGregor 0-1, C Connery 0-1. | Referee: K Healy (Ballymartle) |

| 1 May 2004 Round 1 | St. Finbarr's | 2-14 - 1-15 | Midleton | Páirc Uí Chaoimh, Cork |
| | I O'Mahony 1-1, R Curran 1-0, K Murray 0-3, B O'Driscoll 0-3, C McCarthy 0-3, R O'Mahony 0-2, M Ryan 0-1, A Kelly 0-1. | | L Walsh 0-7, M O'Connell 0-4, P Smith 1-0, J Moynihan 0-1, G Manley 0-1, M Keohane 0-1, W O'Brien 0-1. | Referee: D Kirwan (Éire Óg) |

| 1 May 2004 Round 1 | Castlelyons | 0-14 - 1-08 | Delanys | Riverstown Sportsfield, Glanmire |
| | Eoin Fitzgerald 0-9, Éamonn Fitzgerald 0-3, T McCarthy 0-1, C McGann 0-1. | | J Egan 1-4, D McElhinney 0-2, J Lynch 0-1, K Egan 0-1. | Referee: M Harrington (Carrigaline) |

| 2 May 2004 Round 1 | Cloyne | 1-13 - 1-12 | Glen Rovers | Clonmult Memorial Park, Midleton |
| | M Naughton 0-5, C Cusack 1-1, C O'Lomasney 0-3, P Cahill 0-1, P O'Sullivan 0-1, C O'Sullivan 0-1, I Quinlan 0-1. | | J Anderson 0-9, G Moylan 1-1, D Dorris 0-1, B Corcoran 0-1. | Referee: G Harrington (Carrigtwohill) |

| 2 May 2004 Round 1 | Killeagh | 2-16 - 1-14 | Blackrock | Clonmult Memorial Park, Midleton |
| | J Deane 0-9, M Landers 1-1, J O'Connor 1-0, Brendan Barry 0-3, J Fitzgerald 0-2, B Walsh 0-1. | | A Browne 1-2, A Coughlan 0-5, J Young 0-3, B O'Keeffe 0-2, B Hennebry 0-1, D Cashman 0-1. | Referee: D Kirwan (Éire Óg) |

| 2 May 2004 Round 1 | Douglas | 2-11 - 0-18 | Sarsfields | Páirc Uí Rinn, Cork |
| | G Wade 1-5, G McLoughlin 1-1, J Moylan 0-2, P Barry 0-2, B Horgan 0-1. | | J Murphy 0-7, K Murphy 0-3, G McCarthy 0-3, P Ryan 0-3, R Ryan 0-1, R Murphy 0-1. | Referee: D Farrell (Mitchelstown) |

| 3 May 2004 Round 1 | Cork Institute of Technology | 1-15 - 2-09 | Newtownshandrum | Carrowkeel Sportsfield, Mallow |
| | V Hurley 0-5, JP O'Callaghan 0-5, S Power 1-0, G McCarthy 0-2, S Dineen 0-2, R Dwyer 0-1. | | B O'Connor 1-5, M Farrell 1-0, P Noonan 0-1, G O'Connor 0-1, PJ King 0-1, J O'Connor 0-1. | Referee: R Murphy (Lyre) |

| 9 May 2004 Round 1 | University College Cork | 0-09 - 1-08 | Erin's Own | Páirc Uí Rinn, Cork |
| | R O'Doherty 0-2, I McCarthy 0-2, T Kenny 0-2, J Fitzpatrick 0-2, E Collins 0-1. | | B Corcoran 0-5, S Daly 1-1, S Dunne 0-1, F Murphy 0-1. | Referee: M Harrington (Carrigaline) |

=== Round 2 ===
| 5 June 2004 Round 2 | Newtownshandrum | 5-10 - 0-13 | Delanys | Castletownroche |
| | JP King 2-1, B O'Connor 0-5, J Bowles 1-1, John O'Connor 1-1, P Morrissey 1-0, G O'Connor 0-2. | | K Egan 0-4, J Egan 0-3, B Egan 0-3, P Finnegan 0-1, J Cooney 0-1, L Lynch 0-1. | Referee: R Murphy (Lyre) |

| 5 June 2004 Round 2 | Douglas | 2-08 - 1-19 | Blackrock | Páirc Uí Rinn, Cork |
| | G Wade 1-3, G McLoughlin 1-2, B Boyle 0-2, T O'Donovan 0-1, M O'Callaghan 0-1. | | A Browne 1-5, A Coughlan 0-4, B Hennebry 0-3, C O'Reilly 0-2, B O'Keeffe 0-2, F Ryan 0-1, P McGrath 0-1, J Young 0-1. | Referee: K Healy (Ballymartle) |

| 2 July 2004 Round 2 | Glen Rovers | 0-16 - 0-12 | University College Cork | Páirc Uí Chaoimh, Cork |
| | J Anderson 0-5, S McGrath 0-4, D Dorris 0-4, G Callinan 0-1, L Treacy 0-1, D Goggin 0-1. | | R O'Brien 0-3, T Kenny 0-3, S Brick 0-2, R O'Doherty 0-2, E Collins 0-1, J Crowley 0-1. | Referee: D Copps (Ballyhea) |

| 2 July 2004 Round 2 | Midleton | 1-11 - 0-12 | Bride Rovers | St. Catherine's GAA Grounds, Ballynoe |
| | L Walsh 0-6, G Manley 1-0, M O'Connell 0-3, A Cahill 0-1, P Smith 0-1. | | B Johnson 0-5, R Cahill 0-2, D Ryan 0-2, T Broderick 0-1, Brian Murphy 0-1, Barry Murphy 0-1. | Referee: M Harrington (Carrigaline) |

=== Round 3 ===
First round

| 9 May 2004 Round 3 | Carbery | 0-08 - 0-28 | Imokilly | Páirc Uí Rinn, Cork |
| | D Lucey 0-2, M Walsh 0-2, C Daly 0-1, J Hickey 0-1, D O'Donoghue 0-1, A Fleming 0-1. | | J Smiddy 0-8, N McCarthy 0-4, D Barrett 0-4, E Conway 0-4, K Morrison 0-4, B Coleman 0-2, L Ahern 0-1, S O'Leary 0-1. | Referee: P O'Neill (Shamrocks) |

| 31 May 2004 Round 3 | Duhallow | 1-13 - 5-11 | Carrigdhoun | Fr. Kelleher Park, Kilbrin |
| | D Broderick 1-3, S Whelan 0-4, K McCarthy 0-1, C Buckley 0-1, D Crowley 0-1, E O'Sullivan 0-1, K Brosnan 0-1, P Barrett 0-1. | | D Duggan 4-0, B O'Driscoll 0-4, B Dineen 1-0, J O'Sullivan 0-2, R Butler 0-2, B Lombard 0-1, P Lombard 0-1, M O'Sullivan 0-1. | Referee: D Copps (Ballyhea) |

| 1 June 2004 Round 3 | Avondhu | 6-17 - 0-05 | Seandún | Riverstown Sportsfield, Glanmire |
| | D Ronan 2-1, J O'Callaghan 1-4, M Allen 1-3, P Dineen 1-2, S Killeen 1-1, A O'Brien 0-3, T O'Riordan 0-2, T Healy 0-1, PJ Copse 0-1. | | E O'Byrne 0-2, C Barry 0-2, JP Murphy 0-1. | Referee: C McAllister (Midleton) |

Second round

| 5 June 2004 Round 3 | Muskerry | 2-12 - 1-12 | Avondhu | Millstreet |
| | F Kelly 0-7, R Ryan 1-1, M O'Sullivan 1-0, J Malone 0-2, J O'Riordan 0-1, E Twomey 0-1. | | S Killeen 1-1, P Dineen 0-4, M Allen 0-3, J O'Callaghan 0-2, T O'Riordan 0-1, PJ Copse 0-1. | Referee: G Harrington (Carrigaline) |

| 29 June 2004 Round 3 | Imokilly | 1-08 - 0-11 | Carrigdhoun | Carrigaline |
| | L Ahern 1-0, J Flavin 0-2, M Fitzgerald 0-2, B Coleman 0-1, N McCarthy 0-1, G Melvin 0-1, D Barrett 0-1. | | B O'Driscoll 0-4, K O'Driscoll 0-2, R Butler 0-2, B Lombard 0-2, D O'Sullivan 0-1. | Referee: J Kearney (Na Piarsaigh) |

| 29 July 2004 Round 3 replay | Imokilly | 1-14 - 0-07 | Carrigdhoun | Páirc Séamus de Barra, Carrigtwohill |
| | M Fitzgerald 1-4, E Conway 0-3, B Coleman 0-2, J Smiddy 0-2, P O'Regan 0-1, D Barrett 0-1, K Morrison 0-1. | | B O'Driscoll 0-3, D Duggan 0-2, K O'Driscoll 0-1, B Lombard 0-1. | Referee: J Kearney (Na Piarsaigh) |

=== Round 4 ===
| 30 July 2004 Round 4 | Newtownshandrum | 3-12 - 0-14 | Erin's Own | Páirc Uí Chaoimh, Cork |
| | B O'Connor 0-6, AT O'Brien 1-1, J Bowles 1-1, John O'Connor 1-0, G O'Connor 0-2, JP King 0-1, I Kelleher 0-1. | | K Murphy 0-6, M Buckley 0-3, B Corcoran 0-2, S Daly 0-1, C O'Connor 0-1, C Coakley 0-1. | Referee: G Harrington (Carrigaline) |

| 31 July 2004 Round 4 | St. Finbarr's | 4-12 - 2-08 | Castlelyons | Caherlag Sportsfield, Glounthaune |
| | K Murray 1-4, R O'Mahony 2-0, B o'Driscoll 0-6, C McCarthy 1-0, M Ryan 0-2. | | J Sexton 1-1, E Fitzgerald 0-4, S McAuliffe 1-0, T Hickey 0-1, O Murphy 0-1, C McGann 0-1. | Referee: M Harrington (Carrigaline) |

| 31 July 2004 Round 4 | Blackrock | 5-21 - 0-09 | Muskerry | Páirc Uí Chaoimh, Cork |
| | B O'Keeffe 3-1, B Hennebry 1-4, C O'Reilly 1-2, L Meaney 0-4, P Tierney 0-3, J Young 0-2, A Browne 0-2, A Coughlan 0-2, E Kiely 0-1. | | F Kiely 0-3, M O'Sullivan 0-2, J Russell 0-2, J Hurley 0-1, J Hughes 0-1. | Referee: P Hogan (Carrigtwohill) |

| 1 August 2004 Round 4 | Cloyne | 5-05 - 0-08 | Midleton | Killeagh |
| | P O'Sullivan 2-1, C Cusack 1-1, C O'Sullivan 1-0, V Cusack 1-0, I Quinlan 0-2, D O'Sullivan 0-1. | | L Walsh 0-3, J Moynihan 0-1, M O'Connell 0-1, M Keohane 0-1, G Manley 0-1, B Behan 0-1. | Referee: D Kirwan (Éire Óg) |

| 1 August 2004 Round 4 | Glen Rovers | 2-12 - 1-15 | Imokilly | Páirc Uí Rinn, Cork |
| | J Anderson 0-8, D Goggin 1-1, D Dorris 1-0, N Harte 0-1, G Callinan 0-1, S McGrath 0-1. | | M Fitzgerald 0-7, P Cahill 0-4, E Conway 1-0, J Smiddy 0-2, B Coleman 0-1, D Barrett 0-1. | Referee: D Copps (Ballyhea) |

| 1 August 2004 Round 4 | Cork Institute of Technology | 2-18 - 2-15 | Killeagh | Páirc Uí Rinn, Cork |
| | D O'Riordan 2-3, M O'Sullivan 0-6, R O'Dwyer 0-3, V Hurley 0-2, G McCarthy 0-1, M Kelly 0-1, B O'Sullivan 0-1, P O'Flynn 0-1. | | J Deane 1-8, Brendan Barry 1-2, B Walsh 0-2, M Byrne 0-1, J Brenner 0-1, J O'Connor 0-1. | Referee: M Myers (Whites Cross) |

| 19 September 2004 Round 4 replay | Glen Rovers | 2-13 - 1-13 | Imokilly | Páirc Uí Rinn, Cork |
| | J Anderson 0-11, M Fitzgerald 1-0 (og), D Cronin 1-0, L Treacy 0-2, S McGrath 0-1. | | M Fitzgerald 1-6, D Barrett 0-2, N McCarthy 0-2, K Morrison 0-1, E Conway 0-1, J Smiddy 0-1. | Referee: D Copps (Ballyhea) |

- Na Piarsaigh and Sarsfields received a bye.

=== Quarter-finals ===
| 25 September 2004 Quarter-final | Blackrock | 0-15 - 1-12 | Glen Rovers | Páirc Uí Chaoimh, Cork |
| | A Browne 0-4, A Coughlan 0-2, J Young 0-2, B O'Keeffe 0-2, B Hennebry 0-2, E Kiely 0-1, D Cashman 0-1, L Meaney 0-1. | | J Anderson 0-10, T Murphy 1-0, D Busteed 0-1, S McGrath 0-1. | Referee: K Healy (Ballymartle) |

| 25 September 2004 Quarter-final | Cloyne | 1-14 - 0-11 | St. Finbarr's | Páirc Uí Chaoimh, Cork |
| | I Quinlan 0-6, D O'Sullivan 1-0, P O'Sullivan 0-3, C O'Sullivan 0-2, C Cusack 0-2, M Naughton 0-1. | | K Murray 0-2, C McCarthy 0-2, R Curran 0-2, B O'Driscoll 0-2, M Ryan 0-1, I O'Mahony 0-1, D O'Regan 0-1. | Referee: D Kirwan (Éire Óg) |

| 26 September 2004 Quarter-final | Na Piarsaigh | 1-16 - 0-07 | Sarsfields | Páirc Uí Rinn, Cork |
| | A Ó hAilpín 0-9, S O'Sullivan 1-1, D Gardiner 0-1, R McGregor 0-1, S Óg Ó hAilpín 0-1, C Connery 0-1, D Walsh 0-1, S O'Sullivan 0-1. | | R Ryan 0-2, J Murphy 0-2, G McCarthy 0-1, P Ryan 0-1, K Murphy 0-1. | Referee: D Copps (Ballyhea) |

| 26 September 2004 Quarter-final | Newtownshandrum | 1-12 - 0-11 | Cork Institute of Technology | Páirc Mac Gearailt, Fermoy |
| | B O'Connor 1-7, J O'Connor 0-3, C Naughton 0-2. | | M O'Sullivan 0-5, C O'Leary 0-2, V Hurley 0-2, R O'Dwyer 0-1. | Referee: G Harrington (Carrigaline) |

| 3 October 2004 Quarter-final replay | Blackrock | 0-18 - 0-11 | Glen Rovers | Páirc Uí Chaoimh, Cork |
| | A Coughlan 0-9, J Young 0-3, A Browne 0-2, D Cashman 0-2, B O'Keeffe 0-1, P Tierney 0-1. | | J Anderson 0-4, S McGrath 0-3, G Callanan 0-2, T Murphy 0-2. | Referee: K Healy (Ballymartle) |

=== Semi-finals ===
| 10 October 2004 Semi-final | Cloyne | 1-14 - 0-14 | Newtownshandrum | Páirc Uí Chaoimh, Cork |
| | E O'Sullivan 1-4, I Quinlan 0-5, V Cusack 0-2, D O'Sullivan 0-1, M Cahill 0-1, P O'Sullivan 0-1. | | B O'Connor 0-6, AT O'Brien 0-3, John O'Connor 0-2, D Mulcahy 0-1, P Mulcahy 0-1, JP King 0-1. | Referee: D Kirwan (Éire Óg) |

| 10 October 2004 Semi-final | Na Piarsaigh | 3-10 - 1-10 | Blackrock | Páirc Uí Chaoimh, Cork |
| | A Ó hAilpín 2-3, C Connery 1-0, S Ó hAilpín 0-2, R McGregor 0-1, C O'Sullivan 0-1, SR O'Sullivan 0-1, M Prendergast 0-1, SP O'Sullivan 0-1. | | A Coughlan 0-5, B O'Keeffe 1-0, A Browne 0-3, B Hennebry 0-1, J Young 0-1. | Referee: C McAllister (Midleton) |

=== Final ===
| 31 October 2004 Final | Na Piarsaigh | 0-17 - 0-10 | Cloyne | Páirc Uí Chaoimh, Cork |
| | A Ó hAilpín 0-5 (0-4 frees, 0-1 65); SP O'Sullivan 0-4; SR O'Sullivan 0-4; C O'Sullivan, Setanta Ó hAilpín, R McGregor, J Gardiner, 0-1 each. | (report) | I Quinlan 0-3 (0-2 frees); L O'Driscoll 0-2; M Naughton 0-2; P Cahill, V Cusack, Diarmuid O'Sullivan (frees), 0-1 each. | Referee: K Healy (Ballymartle) |

== Championship statistics ==
=== Top scorers ===
Top scorer overall

| Rank | Player | Club | Tally | Total | Matches | Average |
|---|---|---|---|---|---|---|
| 1 | John Anderson | Glen Rovers | 0-47 | 47 | 6 | 7.83 |
| 2 | Ben O'Connor | Newtownshandrum | 2-29 | 35 | 5 | 7.00 |
| 3 | Adrian Coughlan | Blackrock | 0-27 | 27 | 6 | 4.50 |
| 4 | Aisake Ó hAilpín | Na Piarsaigh | 3-17 | 26 | 4 | 6.50 |
| 5 | Mickey Fitzgerald | Imokilly | 2-19 | 25 | 5 | 5.00 |
| 6 | Alan Browne | Blackrock | 2-18 | 24 | 6 | 4.00 |
| 7 | Brian O'Keeffe | Blackrock | 4-08 | 20 | 6 | 3.33 |
| 7 | Joe Deane | Killeagh | 1-17 | 20 | 2 | 10.00 |
| 8 | Ian Quinlan | Cloyne | 0-17 | 17 | 5 | 3.40 |
| 9 | Liam Walsh | Midleton | 0-16 | 16 | 3 | 5.33 |

Top scorers in a single game

| Rank | Player | Club | Tally | Total | Opposition |
|---|---|---|---|---|---|
| 1 | Diarmuid Duggan | Carrigdhoun | 4-00 | 12 | Duhallow |
| 2 | Joe Deane | Killeagh | 1-08 | 11 | CIT |
| 2 | John Anderson | Glen Rovers | 0-11 | 11 | Imokilly |
| 3 | Brian O'Keeffe | Blackrock | 3-01 | 10 | Muskerry |
| 3 | Ben O'Connor | Newtownshandrum | 1-07 | 10 | CIT |
| 3 | John Anderson | Glen Rovers | 0-10 | 10 | Blackrock |
| 4 | Diarmuid O'Riordan | CIT | 2-03 | 9 | Killeagh |
| 4 | Aisake Ó hAilpín | Na Piarsaigh | 2-03 | 9 | Blackrock |
| 4 | Mickey Fitzgerald | Imokilly | 1-06 | 9 | Glen Rovers |
| 4 | Eoin Fitzgerald | Castlelyons | 0-09 | 9 | Delanys |
| 4 | John Anderson | Glen Rovers | 0-09 | 9 | Cloyne |
| 4 | Joe Deane | Killeagh | 0-09 | 9 | Blackrock |
| 4 | Aisake Ó hAilpín | Na Piarsaigh | 0-09 | 9 | Sarsfields |
| 4 | Adrian Coughlan | Blackrock | 0-09 | 9 | Glen Rovers |

=== Miscellaneous ===
- Na Piarsaigh win their first title since 1995
- Cloyne qualify for the final for the first time.
