= 1999 Cork Senior Hurling Championship =

Annual hurling competition season

- Dates: 5 June 1999 – 31 October 1999
- Sponsor: TSB Bank
- Champions: Blackrock (30th title); Noel Keane (captain); Michael O'Brien (manager)
- Runners-up: University College Cork; Denis Twomey (captain); Paddy Crowley (manager)

Tournament statistics
- Matches played: 24
- Goals scored: 71 (2.96 per match)
- Points scored: 624 (26 per match)
- Top scorer(s): Joe Deane (3-26)

The 1999 Cork Senior Hurling Championship was the 111th staging of the Cork Senior Hurling Championship since its establishment by the Cork County Board in 1887. The draw for the 1999 opening round fixtures took place on 11 December 1998. The championship began on 5 June 1999 and ended on 31 October 1999. It was the last championship to be played using a straight knock-out format.

Imokilly were the defending champions, however, they were defeated by University College Cork in the semi-final.

On 31 October 1999, Blackrock won the championship following a 3–17 to 0–8 defeat of University College Cork in the final. This was their 30th championship title and their first in 14 championship seasons.

University College Cork's Joe Deane was the championship's top scorer with 3-26.

== Team changes ==
=== To Championship ===
Promoted from the Cork Intermediate Hurling Championship

- Castlelyons

== Results ==
=== First round ===
5 June 1999 First round	Midleton	0-12 - 2-12	Muskerry	Church Road, Blackrock
	M O'Connell 0-10, L Walsh 0-1, G Manley 0-1.		K Murray 1-7, G O'Connell 1-3, D O'Leary 0-1, T O'Mahony 0-1.	Referee: W Horgan (Brian Dillons)

20 June 1999 First round	University College Cork	3-15 - 0-10	Duhallow	Mallow
	E Bennett 1-3, J Kingston 1-2, J O'Brien 0-5, J Deane 1-1, J Enright 0-4.		D Crowley 0-7, M Doyle 0-1, K McCarthy 0-1.	Referee: K Healy (Ballymartle)

21 June 1999 First round	Erin's Own	0-17 - 1-09	Cloyne	Páirc Uí Chonaill, Cork
	J Corcoran 0-11, S Dunne 0-2, F Horgan 0-2, P Geasley 0-1, M Buckley 0-1.		D O'Sullivan 1-2, J Cotter 0-3, B Motherway 0-1, V Cusack 0-1, P Cahill 0-1, D Motherway 0-1.	Referee: G Harrington (Carrigaline)

21 June 1999 First round	Sarsfields	1-09 - 1-11	Ballyhea	Páirc Mac Gearailt, Fermoy
	P O'Callaghan 1-0, J Murphy 0-3, P Ryan 0-3, P Queally 0-2, J Barry 0-1.		D Ronan 1-0, N Ronan 0-3, D O'Riordan 0-2, I Ronan 0-2, J O'Callaghan 0-2, I Curtin 0-1, S Curtin 0-1.	Referee: W Horgan (Brian Dillons)

27 June 1999 First round	Newtownshandrum	3-21 - 2-02	Kilbrittain	Páirc Uí Rinn, Cork
	B O'Connor 0-10, D O'Riordan 2-0, M Reidy 1-0, P Mulcahy 0-3, J O'Connor 0-3, D Mulcahy 0-2, A O'Brien 0-2, I Kelleher 0-1.		V O'Brien 1-0, N Crowley 1-0, D O'Connell 0-1, A Hayes 0-1.	Referee: W Horgan (Brian Dillons)

19 July 1999 First round	Na Piarsaigh	3-15 - 5-06	Bishopstown	Páirc Uí Rinn, Cork
	Mark Mullins 3-6, D Gardiner 0-6, J O'Connor 0-1, R Healy 0-1, K Butterworth 0-1.		D O'Mahony 1-6, M Hayes 1-0, D O'Regan 1-0, C Doyle 1-0, M Murphy 1-0.

25 July 1999 First round	Castlelyons	3-11 - 2-10	Carrigdhoun	Páirc Uí Rinn, Cork
	T McCarthy 1-5, P Murphy 1-1, P O'Brien 1-0, E Fitzgerald 0-3, S McAuliffe 0-1, T Hickey 0-1.		G Cummins 1-4, F Walsh 1-2, R O'Donovan 0-3, J Hurley 0-1.	Referee: D Kirwan (Éire Óg)

=== Second round ===
12 June 1999 Second round	Seandún	2-14 - 1-11	Carbery	Barrett Park, Kinsale
	T Twomey 1-4, J Buckley 1-2, K Egan 0-2, G McLoughlin 0-2, G Wade 0-1, G O'Neill 0-1, G Healy 0-1, J O'Driscoll 0-1.		C Murphy 0-6, P Condon 1-0, T Crowley 0-2, D O'Donoghue 0-2, J Nyhan 0-1.	Referee: P O'Neill (Shamrocks)

20 June 1999 Second round	St. Finbarr's	2-20 - 1-10	Cork Institute of Technology
	C McCarthy 1-1, E Fitzpatrick 1-1, B Cunningham 0-4, K Kelleher 0-4, P McSweeney 0-3, I O'Mahony 0-2, M Ryan 0-2, J Griffin 0-1, A Fitzpatrick 0-1, R Curran 0-1.		PJ Carley 1-0, M O'Neill 0-3, B Kearney 0-2, S Doyle 0-1, D Fahy 0-1, N Lahart 0-1, M Molumphy 0-1, E Carey 0-1.	Referee: P Spillane (Carrigtwohill)

10 July 1999 Second round	Muskerry	2-08 - 2-16	Newtownshandrum	Kanturk
	K Murray 1-4, G O'Connell 1-0, A Shanahan 0-2, B Sheehan 0-1, J Dwyer 0-1.		D Mulcahy 1-3, B O'Connor 0-5, J O'Connor 0-4, D O'Riordan 1-0, P Mulcahy 0-2, A O'Brien 0-1, M Morrissey 0-1.	Referee: R Murphy (Lyre)

10 July 1999 Second round	St. Catherine's	1-14 - 2-07	Ballyhea	Kildorrery
	K Morrison 1-2, C Clancy 0-4, B Cotter 0-3, M Hegarty 0-2, D O'Connell 0-1, D Walsh 0-1, C Clancy 0-1.		N Ronan 1-3, I Curtin 1-1, B Condon 0-1, D Ronan 0-1, I Ronan 0-1.	Referee: D Kirwan (Éire Óg)

11 July 1999 Second round	Imokilly	1-19 - 1-09	Erin's Own	Clonmult Memorial Park, Midleton
	S O'Farrell 1-4, M Landers 0-5, J O'Driscoll 0-4, M Daly 0-2, D Barrett 0-2, B Coleman 0-2.		P Geasley 0-4, S Dunne 1-0, J Corcoran 0-3, K O'Shea 0-1, M Buckley 0-1.	Referee: P Nolan

11 July 1999 Second round	Avondhu	1-14 - 3-15	Blackrock	Rathcormac
	M Finn 1-3, J O'Callaghan 0-3, S Killeen 0-2, B O'Driscoll 0-2, R O'Connell 0-1, D Moher 0-1, T O'Riordan 0-1, A Walsh 0-1.		B O'Keeffe 1-3, A Browne 1-2, A Coughlan 0-5, B Hennebrey 1-1, J O'Flynn 0-2, J Cashman 0-1, D Dempsey 0-1.	Referee: J Motherway (Aghada)

25 July 1999 Second round	Glen Rovers	3-11 - 0-16	Na Piarsaigh	Páirc Uí Chaoimh, Cork
	R Kelleher 2-1, C O'Riordan 0-5, S McGrath 0-4, T Murphy 1-0, B Wall 0-1/		Mark Mullins 0-10, R Healy 0-2, G Fitzgerald 0-1, J O'Connor 0-1, S Guiheen 0-1, Mick Mullins 0-1.	Referee: G Harrington (Carrigaline)

15 August 1999 Second round	University College Cork	1-17 - 2-14	Castlelyons	Rathcormac
	D Bennett 1-5, R Flannery 0-4, J Enright 0-4, J Deane 0-2, E Enright 0-1, E Fitzpatrick 0-1.		T McCarthy 0-8, T Hickey 1-2, S McAuliffe 1-2, P Murphy 0-1, E Fitzgerald 0-1.	Referee: D O'Leary (Cloughduv)

21 August 1999 Second round replay	University College Cork	1-13 - 0-10	Castlelyons	Rathcormac
	J Deane 1-7, D Bennett 0-3, E Bennett 0-1, J O'Brien 0-1, J McDonald 0-1.		T McCarthy 0-6, E Fitzgerald 0-2, C McCarthy 0-1, T Hickey 0-1.	Referee: D O'Leary (Cloughduv)

=== Quarter-finals ===
23 July 1999 Quarter-final	St. Finbarr's	1-14 - 0-13	St. Catherine's	Carrigtwohill
	M Ryan 1-3, B Cunningham 0-6, P McSweeney 0-2, C McCarthy 0-1, E Griffin 0-1, E Fitzpatrick 0-1.		C Clancy 0-5, K Morrison 0-3, C Casey 0-3, D Walsh 0-1, James Sheehan 0-1.	Referee: P O'Neill

14 August 1999 Quarter-final	Blackrock	3-17 - 2-09	Seandún	Páirc Uí Chaoimh, Cork
	B O'Keeffe 2-2, A Coughlan 1-2, A Browne 0-4, D Dempsey 0-3, M Harrington 0-3, A Cummins 0-2, B Hennebrey 0-1.		B Egan 1-2, J Daly 1-0, J Egan 0-2, J McLoughlin 0-2, R O'Hara 0-1, T Twomey 0-1, K Egan 0-1.	Referee: J Motherway (Aghada)

14 August 1999 Quarter-final	Imokilly	1-14 - 1-12	Newtownshandrum	Moore Park, Kilworth
	J O'Driscoll 1-6, S O'Farrell 0-2, B Coleman 0-2, N McCarthy 0-1, J Smiddy 0-1, M Landers 0-1, M Downing 0-1.		M Morrissey 1-1, B O'Connor 0-4, J O'Connor 0-2, D Murphy 0-1, P Mulcahy 0-1, D Riordan 0-1, P Noonan 0-1, JP King 0-1.	Referee: W Horgan (Brian Dillons)

19 September 1999 Quarter-final	University College Cork	1-20 - 0-18	Glen Rovers	Páirc Uí Rinn, Cork
	J Deane 0-10, J Kingston 1-2, J O'Brien 0-3, D Bennett 0-3, E Enright 0-1, J Enright 0-1.		C Riordan 0-8, G Foley 0-4, J Anderson 0-2, G Riordan 0-2, S McGrath 0-1, L Galvin 0-1.	Referee: D Kirwan (Éire Óg)

=== Semi-finals ===
3 October 1999 Semi-final	University College Cork	2-14 - 2-12	Imokilly	Páirc Uí Rinn, Cork
	J Deane 1-4, E Bennett 1-1, D Bennett 0-4, J Kingston 0-3, J Enright 0-2.		M Daly 1-1, J O'Driscoll 0-4, S O'Farrell 1-0, B Coleman 0-3, D Barrett 0-2, R Dwane 0-1, D Creedon 0-1.	Referee: W Horgan (Brian Dillons)

3 October 1999 Semi-final	Blackrock	2-10 - 0-16	St. Finbarr's	Páirc Uí Rinn, Cork
	J Cashman 1-1, A Browne 0-4, F Ryan 1-0, B O'Keeffe 0-3, A Ryan 0-1, B Hennebry 0-1.		A Fitzpatrick 0-4, I O'Mahony 0-3, P McSweeney 0-3, B Cunningham 0-2, C McCarthy 0-2, É Fitzpatrick 0-2.	Referee: J Motherway (Aghada)

10 October 1999 Semi-final replay	Blackrock	1-17 - 0-15	St. Finbarr's	Páirc Uí Chaoimh, Cork
	B O'Keeffe 1-4, A Browne 0-4, A Coughlan 0-3, B Hennebrey 0-2, F Ryan 0-1, N O'Leary 0-1, L Meaney 0-1, A Ryan 0-1.		M Ryan 0-5, C McCarthy 0-2, I O'Mahony 0-2, T Olden 0-2, B Cunningham 0-2, E Fitzpatrick 0-1, R Curran 0-1.	Referee: J Motherway (Aghada)

=== Final ===
31 October 1999 Final	Blackrock	3-17 - 0-08	University College Cork	Páirc Uí Chaoimh, Cork
	A Browne 2-2 (0-1 free); S Coakley 0-5; B O'Keeffe 1-1; B Hennebry 0-3; L Meaney 0-2, A Coughlan 0-2, A Cummins 0-1, M Harrington 0-1.	Report	J Kingston 0-2, D Bennett 0-2 (0-1 `65'), J Enright 0-2, J Deane 0-2 (0-1 free).	Referee: J Motherway (Aghada)

== Championship statistics ==
=== Top scorers ===
Top scorers overall

Rank	Player	Club	Tally	Total	Matches	Average
1	Joe Deane	UCC	3-26	35	6	5.83
2	Brian O'Keeffe	Blackrock	5-13	28	5	5.60
3	Mark Mullins	Na Piarsaigh	3-16	25	2	12.50
3	Alan Browne	Blackrock	3-16	25	5	5.00
5	Timmy McCarthy	Castlelyons	1-19	22	3	7.33
6	Dave Bennett	UCC	1-17	20	5	4.00
7	Ben O'Connor	Newtownshandrum	0-19	19	3	6.33
8	Kevin Murray	Muskerry	2-11	17	2	8.50
8	Jerome O'Driscoll	Imokilly	1-14	17	3	5.66
10	John Kingston	UCC	2-09	15	4	3.75
10	Adrian Coughlan	Blackrock	1-12	15	5	3.00

Top scorers in a single game

Rank	Player	Club	Tally	Total	Opposition
1	Mark Mullins	Na Piarsaigh	3-06	15	Bishopstown
2	John Corcoran	Erin's Own	0-11	11	Cloyne
3	Kevin Murray	Muskerry	1-07	10	Midleton
3	Joe Deane	UCC	1-07	10	Castlelyons
3	Mickey O'Connell	Midleton	0-10	10	Muskerry
3	Ben O'Connor	Newtownshandrum	0-10	10	Kilbrittain
3	Mark Mullins	Na Piarsaigh	0-10	10	Glen Rovers
3	Joe Deane	UCC	0-10	10	Glen Rovers
9	Donal O'Mahony	Bishopstown	1-06	9	Na Piarsaigh
9	Jerome O'Driscoll	Imokilly	1-06	9	Newtownshandrum

=== Miscellaneous ===
- Blackrock win the title for the first time in 14 years.
- University College Cork qualified for the final for the first time since 1970.
- University College Cork miss out on the double after the football team won the SFC.
