= 2005 Munster Senior Hurling Championship final =

- Event: 2005 Munster Senior Hurling Championship
| Cork | Tipperary |
| 1-21 | 1-16 |
- Date: 26 June 2005
- Venue: Páirc Uí Chaoimh, Cork
- Referee: Barry Kelly (Westmeath)
- Attendance: 43,500
- Weather: Sunny

The 2005 Munster Senior Hurling Championship final (sponsored by Guinness) was a hurling match played on Sunday 26 June 2005 at Páirc Uí Chaoimh, Cork, County Cork. It was contested by Cork and Tipperary. Cork, captained by Seán Óg Ó hAilpín, claimed the title, beating Tipperary on a scoreline of 1-21 to 1-16. The match was shown live in Ireland as part of The Sunday Game Live on RTÉ Two.

== Match ==
=== etails ===
26 June
Final

| Cork | 1-21 – 1-16 | Tipperary |
|---|---|---|
| B O'Connor 0-6 (6f), J Deane 0-5 (3f), Kieran Murphy (Sarsfields) 1-2, N Ronan 0-3, J O'Connor 0-2, B Corcoran, N McCarthy, Kieran Murphy (Erin's Own) 0-1 each. | Report | P Kelly 0-7 (2f 1'65'), E Kelly 0-6 (2f), T Dunne 1-0, J Devane 0-2, J Carroll 0-1. |

Páirc Uí Chaoimh, Cork
Referee: Barry Kelly (Westmeath)
