= 1998 All-Ireland Under-21 Hurling Championship =

All-Ireland Under-21 Hurling Championship 1998
Championship Details
- Dates: 3 June 1998 - 20 September 1998
- Teams: 17

All Ireland Champions
- Winners: Cork (11th win)
- Captain: Dan Murphy
- Manager: Bertie Óg Murphy

All Ireland Runners-up
- Runners-up: Galway

Provincial Champions
- Munster: Cork
- Leinster: Kilkenny
- Ulster: Antrim
- Connacht: Not Played

Championship Statistics
- Matches Played: 16
- Top Scorer: Joe Deane (8-31)

The 1998 All-Ireland Under-21 Hurling Championship was the 35th staging of the All-Ireland Under-21 Hurling Championship since its establishment by the Gaelic Athletic Association in 1964. The championship began on 3 June 1998 ended on 20 September 1998.

Cork entered the championship as the defending champions.

On 20 September 1998, Cork won the championship following a 2-15 to 2-10 defeat of Galway in the All-Ireland final. This was their 11th All-Ireland title overall and their second title in succession.

Cork's Joe Deane was the championship's top scorer with 8-31.

== Results ==
=== Leinster Under-21 Hurling Championship ===
First round

3 June 1998 First round	Kildare	1-17 – 2-22	Offaly	St. Conleth's Park, Newbridge
	T Carew 0-12, T Spain 1-1, J Gleeson 1-1, C Buggy 0-2, B Byrne 0-2.		K Farrell 1-11, M Hand 1-1, G Oakley 0-4, D Franks 0-2, C Cassidy 0-2, T Spain 0-1, G Hanniffy 0-1.	Referee: E Morris (Dublin)

3 June 1998 First round	Dublin	5-14 – 0-08	Laois	Dr. Cullen Park, Carlow
	E Carroll 3-1, K Horgan 1-4, T McGrane 0-6, D Daly 1-0, S McDonald 0-1, D Sweeney 0-1, J Martin 0-1.		J Kilmartin 0-3, P Mahon 0-1, E Meagher 0-1, J Coogan 0-1, J McEvoy 0-1, B Lowry 0-1.	Referee: P Neary (Kilkenny)

Semi-finals

24 June 1998 Semi-final	Dublin	2-17 – 1-12	Wexford	Dr. Cullen Park, Carlow
	T McGrane 1-10, D Donnelly 1-1, D Daly 0-2, S Phillips 0-1, R Farrelly 0-1, S Ryan 0-1.		C McGrath 1-7, B Gough 0-1, K Furlong 0-1, C Kehoe 0-1, L O'Brien 0-1, PJ Carley 0-1.	Referee: J Guinan (Kilkenny)

24 June 1998 Semi-final	Kilkenny	3-24 – 1-10	Offaly	O'Moore Park, Portlaoise
	H. Shefflin (0-10), E. Behan (2-2), J Hoyne 0-4, A Geoghegan 0-2, P Delaney 0-2, J Coogan 0-1.		K Farrell 1-4, B Whelehan 0-2, G. Hennessy 0-2, M Hand 0-1, G Oakley 0-1.	Referee: P Ahern (Carlow)

Final

19 July 1998 Final	Kilkenny	2-10 – 0-12	Dublin	Dr. Cullen Park, Carlow
	H Shefflin 1-4, M Hoyne 1-1, O Behan 0-3, J Coogan 0-1, A Geoghegan 0-1.		T McGrane 0-6, D Sweeney 0-2, K Horgan 0-1, E Carroll 0-1, S McDonnell 0-1, S Martin 0-1.	Referee: P Horan (Offaly)

=== Munster Under-21 Hurling Championship ===
First round

24 June 1998 First round	Tipperary	7-15 – 1-03	Kerry	Páirc Uí Chaoimh, Cork
	J Enright 2-4, E O'Neill 2-4, M Kennedy 2-0, K Dunne 1-2, M O'Leary 0-3, P Kelly 0-1, J Carroll 0-1.		M Regan 1-0, I Maunsell 0-2, P Galvin 0-1.

24 June 1998 First round	Cork	4-18 – 1-11	Clare	Semple Stadium, Thurles
	J Deane 2-7, B O'Keeffe 1-1, B O'Connor 0-4, S O'Farrell 1-0, J Anderson 0-2, T McCarthy 0-2, M O'Connell 0-2.		S Ryan 0-6, J Punch 1-0, N Brodie 0-2, A Markham 0-1, G Quinn 0-1, J Reddin 0-1.

Semi-finals

19 July 1998 Semi-final	Tipperary	4-16 – 1-08	Limerick	Semple Stadium, Thurles
	J Enright 1-8, M Kennedy 1-3, E O'Neill 1-2, L Cahill 1-0, K Dunne 0-1, W Maher 0-1, P Kelly 0-1.		B Foley 1-2, M O'Brien 0-2, B Crowe 0-1, J Kelleher 0-1, J Butler 0-1, D Ryan 0-1.	Referee: G Harrington (Cork)

30 July 1998 Semi-final	Cork	6-15 – 0-09	Waterford	Páirc Uí Chaoimh, Cork
	J Deane 3-4, T McCarthy 1-3, S O'Farrell 1-3, B O'Keeffe 1-1, M O'Connell 0-2, J Anderson 0-2.		A Lannon 0-4, B Hannon 0-3, D Bennet 0-1, M Murray 0-1.

Final

23 August 1998 Final	Cork	3-18 – 1-10	Tipperary	Páirc Uí Chaoimh, Cork
	J Deane 1-7, S O'Farrell 1-2, D O'Sullivan 1-0, N Ronan 0-3, M O'Connell 0-2, B O'Keeffe 0-2, T McCarthy 0-1, B O'Connor 0-1.		J Enright 0-6, D Browne 1-0, E O'Neill 0-1, M Kennedy 0-1, M O'Leary 0-1, L Cahill 0-1.	Attendance: 12,000; Referee: S McMahon (Clare)

=== Ulster Under-21 Hurling Championship ===
Semi-finals

27 June 1998 Semi-final	Down	1-11 – 1-10	Derry	McKenna Park, Ballycran
	S McGrattan 1-0, G Gordon 0-3, J McGrattan 0-3, P Mallon 0-2, P Matthews 0-2, S Wilson 0-1.		D McGrellis 1-3, C McCloy 0-3, R Cushnahan 0-2, D Doherty 0-1, E Murray 0-1.

27 June 1998 Semi-final	Monaghan	0-04 – 5-26	Antrim	St. Mary's Park, Castleblayney
	R Woods 0-3, B Reilly 0-1.		B McFall 2-9, A Delargy 1-3, D McKillop 1-1, J Flynn 1-1, K McKeegan 0-3, L Richmond 0-3, J McIntosh 0-2, C Cunning 0-2, S Kelly 0-2.

Final

19 July 1998 Final	Antrim	3-20 – 4-08	Down	Casement Park, Belfast
	B McFall 2-5, A Delargy 1-2, J McIntosh 0-4, S Kelly 0-4, L Richmond 0-3, C Hamill 0-1, J Flynn 0-1.		J McGrattan 3-3, G Gordon 1-0, P Matthews 0-3, R McGrattan 0-1, B Coleman 0-1.	Referee: G Devlin (Armagh)

=== All-Ireland Under-21 Hurling Championship ===
Semi-finals

29 August 1998 Semi-final	Galway	4-18 – 3-07	Kilkenny	Semple Stadium, Thurles
	K Broderick 1-6, E Cloonan 0-6, A Kerins 1-2, D O'Shaughnessy 1-1, M Kerins 1-1, M Cullinane 0-1, F Healy 0-1.		H Shefflin 3-4, N Lahart 0-1, J Young 0-1, S Lanigan 0-1.	Referee: M Wadding (Waterford)

6 September 1998 Semi-final	Cork	3-15 – 0-11	Antrim	Parnell Park, Dublin
	J Deane 2-6, B O'Keeffe 1-2, M O'Connell 0-4, L Ronan 0-2, B O'Connor 0-1.		S Kelly 0-7, B McFall 0-2, L Richmond 0-1, A Delargy 0-1.

Final

20 September 1998 Final	Cork	2-15 – 2-10	Galway	Semple Stadium, Thurles
	M O'Connell 0-7, J Deane 0-7, B O'Keeffe 2-0, J Anderson 0-1.		E Cloonan 1-5, M Kerins 1-3, P Walshe 0-2.	Referee: D Murphy (Wexford)

== Championship statistics ==
=== Top scorers ===
Top scorers overall

Rank	Player	Club	Tally	Total	Matches	Average
1	Joe Deane	Cork	8-31	55	5	11.00
2	Henry Shefflin	Kilkenny	4-18	30	3	10.00
3	Brian McFall	Antrim	4-16	28	3	9.33
4	Johnny Enright	Tipperary	3-18	27	3	9.00
5	Tomás McGrane	Dublin	1-22	25	3	8.33
6	Brian O'Keeffe	Cork	5-06	21	5	4.20
6	Cillian Farrell	Offaly	2-15	21	2	10.50
7	Mickey O'Connell	Cork	0-17	17	5	3.60
8	Eugene O'Neill	Tipperary	3-07	16	3	5.33
9	Johnny McGrattan	Down	3-06	15	2	7.50
