= 1998 All-Ireland Under-21 Hurling Championship final =

1998 All-Ireland Under-21 Hurling Championship Final
- Event: 1998 All-Ireland Under-21 Hurling Championship
Cork	Galway
2-15	2-10
- Date: 20 September 1998
- Venue: Semple Stadium, Thurles
- Referee: Dickie Murphy (Wexford)

The 1998 All-Ireland Under-21 Hurling Championship final was a hurling match that was played at Semple Stadium, Thurles on 20 September 1998 to determine the winners of the 1998 All-Ireland Under-21 Hurling Championship, the 35th season of the All-Ireland Under-21 Hurling Championship, a tournament organised by the Gaelic Athletic Association for the champion teams of the four provinces of Ireland. The final was contested by Cork of Munster and Galway of Connacht, with Cork winning by 2-15 to 2-10.

The All-Ireland final between Cork and Galway was their 12th championship meeting. Cork were hoping to retain the title and win their 11th title over all. Galway were hoping to win their 8th All-Ireland title.

Cork's All-Ireland victory allowed them to retain the title. The win copper-fastened their position as number one on the all-time roll of honour. It remains Cork's last All-Ireland victory.

Galway's All-Ireland defeat was their sixth in a final. It was the second of four successive All-Ireland final defeats.

== Match ==
=== Details ===
20 September 1998

Cork	2-15 - 2-10	Galway
M O'Connell 0-7, J Deane 0-7, B O'Keeffe 2-0, J Anderson 0-1.		E Cloonan 1-5, M Kerins 1-3, P Walshe 0-2.

Semple Stadium, Thurles
Referee: D Murphy (Wexford)
