= 1999 Munster Senior Hurling Championship final =

- Event: 1999 Munster Senior Hurling Championship
Cork	Clare
1-15	0-14
- Date: 4 July 1999
- Venue: Semple Stadium, Thurles
- Referee: Pat O'Connor (Limerick)
- Attendance: 54,000
- Weather: Sunny

The 1999 Munster Senior Hurling Championship final (sponsored by Guinness) was a hurling match played on Sunday 4 July 2000 at Semple Stadium, Thurles, County Tipperary. It was contested by Cork and Clare. Cork, captained by Mark Landers, claimed the title, beating Clare on a scoreline of 1-15 to 0-14.

Joe Deane got the only goal of the game in the first half when a high ball was kept in play on the right by Seánie McGrath for him to flick low past Clare goalkeeper Davy Fitzgerald. Cork had a 1-10 to 0-7 lead at half time. The match was shown live in Ireland as part of The Sunday Game Live on RTÉ Two.

== Details ==
1999-07-04
Final

Cork	1-15 – 0-14	Clare
J. Deane 1-4 (0-4 frees); M. O'Connell 0-5 (0-2 frees, 0-1 seventy); B. O'Connor and S. McGrath 0-2 each; N. Ronan and F. McCormack 0-1 each.	(report)	N. Gilligan 0-3; D. Forde 0-3 (0-2 frees); O. Baker 0-2; R. O'Hara, S. McMahon (free), A. Markham, B. Murphy, C. Lynch and D. Scanlan 0-1 each.

Semple Stadium, Thurles
Referee: P. O'Connor (Limerick)
