= 1994 All-Ireland Minor Hurling Championship =

All-Ireland Minor Hurling Championship 1994
Championship Details
- Dates: 7 May 1994 - 4 September 1994
- Teams: 15

All Ireland Champions
- Winners: Galway (3rd win)
- Captain: Greg Kennedy
- Manager: Mattie Murphy

All Ireland Runners-up
- Runners-up: Cork
- Captain: Brian Hurley
- Manager: Jimmy Barry-Murphy

Provincial Champions
- Munster: Cork
- Leinster: Kilkenny
- Ulster: Down
- Connacht: Not Played

Championship Statistics
- Top Scorer: Brian O'Driscoll (0-26)

The 1994 All-Ireland Minor Hurling Championship was the 64th staging of the All-Ireland Minor Hurling Championship since its establishment by the Gaelic Athletic Association in 1928. The championship began on 7 May 1994 and ended on 4 September 1994.

Kilkenny entered the championship as the defending champions, however, they were beaten by Galway in the All-Ireland semi-final.

On 4 September 1994, Galway won the championship following a 2-10 to 1-11 defeat of Cork in the All-Ireland final. This was their third championship title overall and their first title since 1992.

Cork's Brian O'Driscoll was the championship's top scorer with 0-26.

== Results ==
=== Leinster Minor Hurling Championship ===
First round

7 May 1994 First round	Laois	1-03 - 2-14	Dublin	O'Connor Park, Tullamore
	M Phelan 1-0, P Bowe 0-2, T Guilfoyle 0-1.		K Flynn 1-3, P O'Donoghue 1-2, D Sweeney 0-4, S Phillips 0-3, C Meehan 0-2.	Referee: M Sheridan (Kildare)

Quarter-final

21 May 1994 Quarter-final	Dublin	2-17 - 1-05	Westmeath	O'Connor Park, Tullamore
	S Phillips 0-6, P O'Donoghue 1-2, G Kinahan 1-0, K Morgan 0-3, C Meehan 0-2, D Sweeeney 0-2, A Boylan 0-1, M Healy 0-1.		C Fanning 1-0, D Devine 0-2, E Smith 0-1, F Shaw 0-1, M Scally 0-1.	Referee: P Aherne (Carlow)

Semi-finals

26 June 1994 Semi-final	Offaly	4-05 - 2-09	Wexford	Croke Park, Dublin
	J Ryan 2-0, D O'Meara 1-3, S Whelehan 1-0, G Hanniffy 0-1, D Dooley 0-1.		G Dunne 1-1, M Cleere 0-4, N Shiel 1-0, M Shiggins 0-2, PJ Carley 0-1, I Murphy 0-1.	Referee: P Neary (Kilkenny)

2 July 1994 Semi-final	Dublin	1-06 - 1-17	Kilkenny	Croke Park, Dublin
	S Phillips 1-4, K Horgan 0-1, M Healy 0-1.		K O'Shea 1-5, D Cleere 0-6, N O'Connor 0-3, B Kelly 0-2, M O'Neill 0-1.	Referee: E Carroll

Final

17 July 1994 Final	Kilkenny	2-13 - 3-06	Offaly	Croke Park, Dublin
	D Cleere 1-4, M Purcell 1-1, D O'Meara 1-0, J Phelan 0-2, K O'Shea 0-2, M O'Neill 0-2, K Lanigan 0-1, B Kelly 0-1.		K Lambe 2-2, D O'Meara 1-0, J Ryan 0-1, P Mulhaire 0-1, G Doorley 0-1, T Spain 0-1.	Referee: P Aherne (Carlow)

=== Munster Minor Hurling Championship ===
First round

11 May 1995 First round	Cork	1-16 - 0-13	Clare	Gaelic Grounds, Limerick
	B O'Driscoll 0-6, K Kelleher 1-1, A Walsh 0-2, D Ronan 0-2, K McCarthy 0-2, K Egan 0-1, G Shaw 0-1, J o'Flynn 0-1.		M Conlon 0-6, D Forde 0-2, C Shannon 0-1, B Babbington 0-1, D Scanlon 0-1, J Kennirons 0-1, D Healy 0-1.	Referee: M Wadding (Waterford)

Semi-finals

29 June 1994 Semi-final	Cork	2-22 - 1-07	Limerick	Páirc Mac Gearailt, Fermoy
	D Ronan 1-6, P Mullaney 1-1, B O'Driscoll 0-4, K Kelleher 0-3, A Walsh 0-3, K McCarthy 0-2, J O'Flynn 0-1, G Shaw 0-1, K Egan 0-1.		P Coleman 1-0, B Tobin 0-3, D Reale 0-1, P Neenan 0-1, J Horigan 0-1, S O'Dwyer 0-1.	Referee: P Moore (Waterford)

29 June 1994 Semi-final	Waterford	2-10 - 0-15	Tipperary	Páirc Mac Gearailt, Fermoy
	D Bennett 1-2, D Byrne 1-0, M White 0-2, B Walsh 0-2, R McGrath 0-2, D Shanahan 0-2.		J Enright 0-8, L Cahill 0-4, A Moloney 0-2, B Horan 0-1.	Referee: L o'Flynn (Cork)

Final

10 July 1994 Final	Cork	2-15 - 0-09	Waterford	Semple Stadium, Thurles
	D Ronan 1-4, K Kelleher 1-0, B O'Driscoll 0-4, P O'Connor 0-3, J O'Flynn 0-2, G Shaw 0-1, K Egan 0-1.		D Bennett 0-5, R McGrath 0-2, T Flynn 0-1, D Shanahan 0-1.	Referee: P O'Connor (Limerick)

=== Ulster Minor Hurling Championship ===
Semi-final

26 June 1994 Semi-final	Down	3-10 - 1-08	Derry	Athletic Grounds, Armagh
				Referee: T McIntyre (Antrim)

Final

3 July 1994 Final	Antrim	3-10 - 3-11	Down	Casement Park, Belfast
	A McCloskey 1-3, R McQuillan 1-2, M Molloy 1-1, B McFall 0-2, C McCormack 0-2.		S Murray 2-1, J McGrattan 0-6, F Bell 1-0, P Matthews 0-2, D Rogan 0-2.	Referee: P Aherne (Carlow)

=== All-Ireland Minor Hurling Championship ===
Semi-finals

7 August 1994 Semi-final	Galway	1-14 - 2-09	Kilkenny	Croke Park, Dublin
	R Farrell 1-1, R Gantley 0-4, K Broderick 0-4, G Glynn 0-2, E Brady 0-1, M Cullinane 0-1, F Healy 0-1.		K O'Shea 1-2, D Cleere 0-5, J Connolly 1-0, M O'Neill 0-2.

14 August 1994 Semi-final	Cork	2-20 - 2-01	Down	Croke Park, Dublin
	B O'Driscoll 0-9, D Ronan 1-1, J O'Flynn 1-0, K Egan 0-4, A Walsh 0-3, K Kelleher 0-1, P Mullaney 0-1, B McSweeney 0-1.		D Rogan 1-1, B Coleman 1-0.	Referee: A Mac Suibhne (Dublin)

Final

4 September 1994 Final	Galway	2-10 - 1-11	Cork	Croke Park, Dublin
	E Brady 2-0, K Broderick 0-5, R Gantley 0-4, R Farrell 0-1.		K Kelleher 1-0, B O'Driscoll 0-3, D Ronan 0-3, K Egan 0-2, J O'Flynn 0-2, P Mullaney 0-1.	Referee: A Mac Suibhne (Dublin)

== Championship statistics ==
=== Top scorers ===
Top scorer overall

Rank	Player	Club	Tally	Total	Matches	Average
1	Brian O'Driscoll	Cork	0-26	26	5	5.20
2	Darren Ronan	Cork	3-16	25	5	5.00
3	Damien Cleere	Kilkenny	1-15	18	3	6.00
4	Stephen Phillips	Dublin	1-13	16	3	5.33
5	Ken O'Shea	Kilkenny	0-26	15	3	5.00

=== Miscellaneous ===
- The All-Ireland semi-final between Cork and Down was their first ever meeting in the championship.
