= 2000 Munster Senior Hurling Championship final =

- Event: 2000 Munster Senior Hurling Championship
| Cork | Tipperary |
| 0-23 | 3-12 |
- Date: 2 July 2000
- Venue: Semple Stadium, Thurles
- Referee: P. Horan (Offaly)
- Attendance: 53,286

The 2000 Munster Senior Hurling Championship final (sponsored by Guinness) was a hurling match played on Sunday 2 July 2000 at Semple Stadium, Thurles, County Tipperary,. It was contested by Cork and Tipperary. Cork, captained by Fergal Ryan, claimed the title, beating Tipperary on a scoreline of 0-23 to 3-12. The match was shown live in Ireland as part of The Sunday Game Live on RTÉ Two.

== Match ==
=== Details ===
2000-07-02
Final

| Cork | 0-23 – 3-12 | Tipperary |
|---|---|---|
| J Deane 0-10 (7f), B O'Connor, S McGrath, A Browne 0-3 each, P Ryan 0-2 (1f), D Barrett, K Murray 0-1 each. | (report) | E O'Neill 1-5 (4f), T Dunne 2-0, B O'Meara, E Enright 0-2 each, J Leahy, P Kelly, L Cahill 0-1 each. |

Semple Stadium, Thurles
Referee: P. Horan (Offaly)
