= 1997 All-Ireland Under-21 Hurling Championship final =

1997 All-Ireland Under-21 Hurling Championship Final
- Event: 1997 All-Ireland Under-21 Hurling Championship
Cork	Galway
3-11	0-13
- Date: 21 September 1997
- Venue: Semple Stadium, Thurles
- Referee: Pat Horan (Offaly)
- Attendance: 10,378

The 1997 All-Ireland Under-21 Hurling Championship final was a hurling match that was played at Semple Stadium, Thurles on 21 October 1997 to determine the winners of the 1997 All-Ireland Under-21 Hurling Championship, the 34th season of the All-Ireland Under-21 Hurling Championship, a tournament organised by the Gaelic Athletic Association for the champion teams of the four provinces of Ireland. The final was contested by Cork of Munster and Galway of Connacht, with Cork winning by 3-11 to 0-13.

The All-Ireland final between Cork and Galway was their 11th championship meeting. Cork were hoping to win their 10th title over all. Galway were hoping to retain the title and win their 8th All-Ireland title.

Galway entered the game as reigning champions and warm favourites as they fielded 12 of the team that won the title the previous year. Although playing against the wind in the first half, Cork scored two vital goals to hold a five-point 2-6 to 0-7 interval lead. In a hard-fought second half Cork maintained their grip on the game to secure a seven-point victory.

Cork's All-Ireland victory was their first since 1988. The win copper-fastened their position as number one on the all-time roll of honour. This victory was Cork's 100th All-Ireland title in all grades of inter-county hurling.

Galway's All-Ireland defeat was their fifth in a final. It was also the first of three successive All-Ireland final defeats.

== Match ==
=== Details ===
21 September 1997

Cork	3-11 – 0-13	Galway
M O'Connell 0-5, D Ronan 1-1, S O'Farrell 1-1, J Deane 1-0, P Ryan 0-2, J O'Flynn 0-1, B O'Driscoll 0-1.		E Cloonan 0-7, R Gantley 0-2, M Cullinane 0-2, G Glynn 0-1, F Healy 0-1.

Semple Stadium, Thurles
Attendance: 10,378
Referee: P Horan (Offaly)

Cork	Galway
