= 1995 All-Ireland Minor Hurling Championship =

All-Ireland Minor Hurling Championship 1995
Championship Details
- Dates: 29 April 1995 – 3 September 1995

All Ireland Champions
- Winners: Cork (16th win)
- Captain: Brian O'Keeffe
- Manager: Jimmy Barry-Murphy

All Ireland Runners-up
- Runners-up: Kilkenny
- Captain: Paul Hoyne
- Manager: Liam Barron

Provincial Champions
- Munster: Cork
- Leinster: Kilkenny
- Ulster: Antrim
- Connacht: Not Played

Championship Statistics
- Top Scorer: Stephen Phillips (2-24)

The 1995 All-Ireland Minor Hurling Championship was the 65th staging of the All-Ireland Minor Hurling Championship since its establishment by the Gaelic Athletic Association in 1928. The championship began on 29 April 1995 and ended on 3 September 1995.

Galway entered the championship as the defending champions, however, they were defeated by Cork in the All-Ireland semi-final.

On 3 September 1995, Cork won the title after defeating Kilkenny by 2–10 to 1–2 in the All-Ireland final. This was their 16th championship title overall and their first title since 1985.

Dublin's Stephen Phillips was the championship's top scorer with 2-24.

== Results ==
=== Leinster Minor Hurling Championship ===
First round

29 April 1995 First round	Westmeath	1-02 – 4-21	Dublin	O'Connor Park, Tullamore
	M Scally 1-0, F Shaw 0-1, D Johnson 0-1.		E Carroll 2-5, S Phillips 1-7, D Sweeney 0-5, L Ryan 1-1, K Horgan 0-1, S Martin 0-1, T Ó hOldáin 0-1.	Referee: C Byrne (Wicklow)

Quarter-finals

20 May 1995 Quarter-final	Laois	2-07 – 0-13	Dublin	O'Connor Park, Tullamore
	J Hoyne 1-2, D Rooney 1-0, J Conroy 0-2, L Wynne 0-1, S O'Hanlon 0-1, J Maher 0-1.		S Phillips 0-5, E Carroll 0-3, M Kenny 0-2, S Martin 0-1, K Horgan 0-1, L Ryan 0-1.	Referee: S O'Meara (Offaly)

24 June 1995 Quarter-final replay	Laois	2-05 – 1-10	Dublin	O'Connor Park, Tullamore
	B Delaney 1-3, L Wynne 1-0, S Hanlon 0-1, J Conroy 0-1.		S Phillips 1-4, J Hennessy 0-3, D Sweeney 0-2, R Farrelly 0-1.	Referee: S O'Meara (Offaly)

Semi-finals

28 June 1995 Semi-final	Kilkenny	1-11 – 0-11	Wexford	Dr. Cullen Park, Carlow
	O Behan 1-3, M Hoyne 0-3, PJ Cody 0-1, M Dunphy 0-1, S Lanigan 0-1, R Cahill 0-1, G Kirwan 0-1.		B Doyle 0-7, PJ Carley 0-3, M Murphy 0-1.	Referee: P Ahern (Carlow)

30 June 1995 Semi-final	Offaly	2-11 – 0-12	Dublin	O'Moore Park, Portlaoise
	K Farrell 0-7, T Spain 1-3, D Kelly 1-0, M Murray 0-1.		S Phillips 0-8, D Sweeney 0-2, J Hennessy 0-1, E Carroll 0-1.	Referee: P Dunphy (Kilkenny)

Final

16 July 1995 Final	Kilkenny	4-16 – 2-06	Offaly	Croke Park, Dublin
	R Cahill 2-4, O Behan 2-2, G Kirwan 0-5, M Hoyle 0-2, R Mullally 0-2, S Millea 0-1.		N Kirwan 1-0, P Leonard 1-0, K Farrell 0-3, M Murray 0-1, G Hanniffy 0-1, D Kelly 0-1.	Referee: O O'Neill (Meath)

=== Munster Minor Hurling Championship ===
First round

First round	Limerick	w/o – scr.	Kerry

3 May 1995 First round	Waterford	2-16 – 4-04	Clare	Canon Hayes Park, Bansha
	D Bennett 0-8, D Shanahan 1-3, M White 1-0, J O'Meara 0-2, M Murray 0-1, S Flynn 0-1, M Molumphy 0-1.		S Fitzpatrick 1-1, J Kenirons 1-0, P Minogue 1-0, K Linehan 1-0, J Pyne 0-2, A Markham 0-1.	Referee: J Sexton (Limerick)

Semi-finals

28 June 1995 Semi-final	Limerick	1-03 – 2-14	Cork	Fitzgerald Stadium, Killarney
	J Cormican 1-0, B Foley 0-2, J Kelleher 0-1.		M O'Connell 0-6, S O'Farrell 1-2, J Deane 1-1, B O'Keeffe 0-2, A Walsh 0-1, P Mullaney 0-1, A Coughlan 0-1.	Referee: P Moore (Waterford)

28 June 1995 Semi-final	Waterford	3-12 – 2-14	Tipperary	Páirc Mac Gearailt, Fermoy
	D Bennett 0-6, M Murray 1-1, M White 1-1, E Bennett 1-0, D Shanahan 0-2, J O'Meara 0-1, S Flynn 0-1.		M Kennedy 1-1, M Beevins 1-1, J Enright 0-3, L Cahill 0-2, E O'Neill 0-2, M O'Leary 0-2, E Corcoran 0-1, D Kelly 0-1, M Keeshan 0-1.	Referee: S McMahon (Clare)

Final

9 July 1995 Final	Cork	3-18 – 0-10	Waterford	Semple Stadium, Thurles
	M O'Connell 0-7, T McCarthy 2-0, S O'Farrell 1-2, B O'Keeffe 0-3, A Coughlan 0-3, J Deane 0-2, A Walsh 0-1.		J O'Meara 0-2, D Shanahan 0-2, D Bennett 0-2, S Flynn 0-1, M White 0-1, K McGrath 0-1, M Molumphy 0-1.	Referee: P O'Connor (Limerick)

=== Ulster Minor Hurling Championship ===
Semi-final

18 June 1995 Semi-final	Derry	2-10 – 1-11	Down	MacCumhaill Park, Ballybofey
	P McCluskey 0-6, D McGrellis 1-0, R O'Hagan 1-0, N Stephenson 0-3, E Farren 0-1.		J McGrattan 1-3, P Mallon 0-2, P Matthews 0-2, B Coleman 0-1, G Gordon 0-1, S McGrattan 0-1, P Coulter 0-1.

Final

9 July 1995 Final	Antrim	2-17 – 1-04	Derry	Casement Park, Belfast
	L McMullan 1-2, L McFall 0-5, C Hamill 1-1, A Delargy 0-3, C Kelly 0-2, L Richmond 0-1, J Flynn 0-1, P Gillen 0-1, K McKay 0-1.		D Lockhart 1-0, N Stephenson 0-2, P McCluskey 0-1, D Doherty 0-1.	Referee: P Aherne (Carlow)

=== All-Ireland Minor Hurling Championship ===
Semi-finals

5 August 1995 Semi-final	Antrim	0-12 – 1-16	Kilkenny	Croke Park, Dublin
	A Delargy 0-8, J Flynn 0-1, P Gillan 0-1, B McFall 0-1, L McMullan 0-1.		R Cahill 0-9, G Kirwan 1-0, M Hoyne 0-4, O Behan 0-3.	Referee: S McMahon (Clare)

12 August 1995 Semi-final	Cork	2-08 – 0-12	Galway	Semple Stadium, Thurles
	J Deane 1-2, S Farrell 1-0, T McCarthy 0-2, D Murphy 0-1, P Mullaney 0-1, J O'Dwyer 0-1, A Coughlan 0-1.		F Healy 0-3, K Broderick 0-2, A Kerins 0-2, F Gantley 0-2, K Flaherty 0-1, D Fahy 0-1, J Lynskey 0-1.	Referee: A Mac Suibhne (Dublin)

Final

3 September 1995 Final	Cork	2-10 – 1-02	Kilkenny	Croke Park, Dublin
	M O'Connell 1-3, J Deane 1-2, D Murphy 0-2, A Walsh 0-2, A O'Farrell 0-1.		S Millea 1-0, R Cahill 0-1, R Mullally 0-1.	Referee: P O'Connor (Limerick)

== Championship statistics ==
=== Top scorers ===
Top scorers overall

Rank	Player	Club	Tally	Total	Matches	Average
1	Stephen Phillips	Dublin	2-24	30	4	7.50
2	Ramie Cahill	Kilkenny	2-15	21	4	5.25
3	Mickey O'Connell	Cork	1-16	19	4	4.75
4	Owen Behan	Kilkenny	3-08	17	4	4.25
5	Joe Deane	Cork	3-07	16	4	4.00
5	Dave Bennett	Waterford	0-16	16	3	5.33
