= 1997 All-Ireland Under-21 Hurling Championship =

All-Ireland Under-21 Hurling Championship 1997
Championship Details
- Dates: 18 June 1997 – 21 September 1997
- Teams: 16

All Ireland Champions
- Winners: Cork (10th win)
- Captain: Dan Murphy
- Manager: Bertie Óg Murphy

All Ireland Runners-up
- Runners-up: Galway
- Captain: Liam Hodgins
- Manager: Cyril Farrell

Provincial Champions
- Munster: Cork
- Leinster: Wexford
- Ulster: Derry
- Connacht: Not Played

Championship Statistics
- Top Scorer: Eugene O'Neill (5-18)

The 1997 All-Ireland Under-21 Hurling Championship was the 34th staging of the All-Ireland Under-21 Hurling Championship since its establishment by the Gaelic Athletic Association in 1964. The championship began on 18 June 1997 and ended on 21 September 1997.

Galway entered the championship as the defending champions.

On 21 September 1997, Cork won the championship following a 3-11 to 0-13 defeat of Galway in the All-Ireland final. This was their 10th All-Ireland title overall and their first championship title since 1988.

Tipperary's Eugene O'Neill was the championship's top scorer with 5-18.

== Results ==
=== Leinster Under-21 Hurling Championship ===
Quarter-finals

25 June 1997 Quarter-final	Wicklow	1-08 - 3-14	Dublin	Aughrim County Ground, Aughrim
	J Keogh 0-5, J Berkerey 1-0, D Collins 0-2, K Furlong 0-1.		E Carroll 3-0, I McCrane 0-9, P Donoghue 0-2, D Sweeney 0-1, M Healy 0-1, K Horgan 0-1.

Semi-finals

2 July 1997 Semi-final	Kilkenny	1-09 - 1-10	Wexford	Nowlan Park, Kilkenny
	D Cleere 0-5, K O'Shea 1-1, N Purcell 0-1, J Coogan 0-1, J Maher 0-1.		P Codd 0-6, J Purcell 1-0, I Murphy 0-2, J Lawlor 0-1, E Cullen 0-1.

3 July 1997 Semi-final	Offaly	1-13 - 1-09	Dublin	Cusack Park, Mullingar
	P Mulhaire 0-4, K Farrell 0-4, A Mannion 1-0, C Cassidy 0-2, D O'Meara 0-2, G Oakley 0-1.		E Carroll 1-3, T McGrane 0-3, K Horgan 0-2, S Ryan 0-1.

Final

20 July 1997 Final	Wexford	2-13 - 0-15	Offaly	Dr. Cullen Park, Carlow
	PJ Carley 2-0, P Codd 0-5, D O'Reilly 0-2, C Byrne 0-2, E Cullen 0-2, M O'Leary 0-1, J Purcell 0-1.		K Farrell 0-7, C Cassidy 0-2, M Hand 0-1, D O'Meara 0-1, P Mulhaire 0-1, K Lamb 0-1, J Reilly 0-1, T Spain 0-1.	Referee: P Ahern (Carlow)

=== Munster Under-21 Hurling Championship ===
Quarter-finals

18 June 1997 Quarter-final	Cork	6-26 - 0-5	Kerry	Páirc Uí Chaoimh
	D Ronan 2-5, J Deane 2-3, A Walsh 1-4, J O'Dwyer 0-5, C Buckley 1-1, S Óg Ó hAilpín 0-2, B Coleman 0-2, B O'Driscoll 0-1, D Barrett 0-1, T McCarthy 0-1, D O'Sullivan 0-1.		M Slattery 0-3, B Sheehan 0-2.

19 June 1997 Quarter-final	Limerick	2-12 - 5-15	Tipperary	Gaelic Grounds
	B Tobin 0-8, B Foley 2-0, P Neenan 0-2, P Coleman 0-1, D Ryan 0-1.		E O'Neill 3-5, P O'Dwyer 1-3, L Cahill 1-2, M O'Leary 0-2, J Enright 0-1, M Dowd 0-1.	Referee: G Harrington (Cork)

Semi-finals

16 July 1997 Semi-final	Tipperary	5-16 - 1-15	Waterford	Semple Stadium
	E O'Neill 2-7, M Kennedy 2-2, J Enright 0-2, P O'Dwyer 0-2, J Carroll 0-1, A Moloney 0-1, L Cahill 0-1.		K McGrath 1-9, B Walsh 0-3, D Shanahan 0-1, R McGrath 0-1.	Referee: A O'Sullivan (Cork)

17 July 1997 Semi-final	Cork	2-13 - 1-14	Clare	Semple Stadium
	M O'Connell 0-7, D Ronan 1-2, B O'Keeffe 1-0, B O'Driscoll 0-2, D O'Sullivan 0-1, T McCarthy 0-1.		M Conlon 0-8, J Kenirons 1-0, D Forde 0-3, A Markham 0-1, D Scanlon 0-1, A Rogers 0-1.

Final

30 July 1997 Final	Tipperary	0-13 - 1-11	Cork	Semple Stadium
	E O'Neill 0-6, L Cahill 0-4, M Bevans 0-2, G Flanagan 0-1.		M O'Connell 0-6, T McCarthy 1-2, D Ronan 0-1, P Ryan 0-1, A Walsh 0-1.	Referee: P O'Connor (Limerick)

=== Ulster Under-21 Hurling Championship ===
Semi-finals

28 June 1997 Semi-final	Derry	2-14 - 1-08	Down	Celtic Park
	D Lockhart 2-1, D Doherty 0-4, G Biggs 0-4, D McGrellis 0-3, R O'Hagan 0-2.		J McGrattan 0-4, S McGrattan 1-0, C Young 0-1, G Gordon 0-1, S Murray 0-1, B Coleman 0-1.

28 June 1997 Semi-final	Donegal	0-07 - 3-20	Antrim	MacCumhaill Park
	M McCann 0-4, C Dowds 0-1, JM Wallace 0-1, J Doherty 0-1.		C Hamill 1-10, J McIntosh 1-3, C Smith 1-0, A Delargy 0-3, L Richmond 0-2, S McGarry 0-1, S Kelly 0-1.

Final

19 July 1997 Final	Derry	2-11 - 0-17	Antrim	Emmet Park
	G Biggs 1-2, D McGrellis 1-2, D Doherty 0-5, Darren Doherty 0-1, P McCloskey 0-1.		C Hamill 0-6, A Delargy 0-3, R McNaughten 0-3, L Richmond 0-2, K McKay 0-1, J McIntosh 0-1, S Kelly 0-1.	Referee: JA Gribben (Down)

23 July 1997 Final replay	Derry	0-22 - 1-16 (aet)	Antrim	Emmet Park
				Referee: JA Gribben (Down)

=== All-Ireland Under-21 Hurling Championship ===
Semi-finals

7 September 1997 Semi-final	Cork	2-12 - 1-6	Wexford	Fraher Field
	M O'Connell 0-6 (two frees, two 65s), J Deane 1-2, J O'Flynn 1-1, S O'Farrell 0-2, A Walsh 0-1.		E Cullen 1-0, P Codd 0-3 (two frees, one 65), C Byrne 0-1, J Purcell 0-1, D O'Reilly 0-1.	Attendance: 9,000; Referee: W Barrett (Tipperary)

7 September 1997 Semi-final	Galway	8-26 - 0-7	Derry	Markievicz Park
	E Cloonan 3-10, A Kerins 2-1, O Canning 1-4, D Shaughnessy 1-4, K Broderick 1-0, B Carr 0-3, M Cullinane 0-2, G Glynn 0-2.		D Doherty 0-4, R O'Hagan 0-2, D McGrealish 0-1.	Referee: P Delaney (Laois)

Final

21 September 1997 Final	Cork	3-11 - 0-13	Galway	Semple Stadium
	M O'Connell 0-5 (four frees), D Ronan 1-1, S O'Farrell 1-1, J Deane 1-0, P Ryan 0-2, J O'Flynn 0-1, B O'Driscoll 0-1.		E Cloonan 0-7 (three frees, two 65s), M Cullinane 0-2, R Gantley 0-2, G Glynn 0-1, F Healy 0-1.	Attendance: 10,378; Referee: P Horan (Offaly)

== Championship statistics ==
=== Miscellaneous ===
- The All-Ireland final was the first meeting of Cork and Galway at that stage of the championship since 1982.
- Cork's final victory gave them their 100th All-Ireland title overall.
