= 2009 National Hurling League =

78th season of the National Hurling League

National Hurling League 2009

League details
- Dates: 7 February 2009 – 3 May 2009
- Teams: 34

League champions
- Winners: Kilkenny (14th win)

Other division winners
- Division 2: Offaly
- Division 3A: Kildare
- Division 3B: London
- Division 4: Sligo

The 2009 National Hurling League (known as the Allianz National Hurling League for sponsorship reasons) was the 78th season of the National Hurling League.

== Structure ==
The National Hurling League saw a major restructuring of the usual four divisions with the teams divided more equitably into a five-tier structure.

Division 1 was a single division and was confined to the top eight teams. The top two teams in the division qualified for the final. Division 2 operated in a similar manner.

Division 3A was a newly created division and consisted of six teams. The top two teams in the division qualified for the final. Division 3B operated in a similar manner, however, that division consisted of seven teams.

Division 4 was a single division consisting of six teams. The top two teams in the division qualified for the final.

== Division 1 ==
National Hurling League Division 1
- Season: 2009
- Champions: Kilkenny; 14th National League title Captain: Michael Fennelly; Manager: Brian Cody
- Relegated: Clare
- Matches: 29
- Top goalscorer: Alan McCrabbe (1-50)
- Biggest home win: Kilkenny 4-26 - 0-11 Cork (5 April 2009)
- Biggest away win: Galway 4-16 - 1-11 Cork (1 March 2009)
- Highest scoring: Tipperary 4-17 - 2-26 Kilkenny (3 May 2009)
- All statistics correct as of 10 April 2017.

Tipperary came into the season as defending champions of the 2008 season.

On 3 May 2009, Kilkenny won the title after a 4–17 to 2-26 extra-time win over Tipperary. It was their first league title since 2006 and their 14th National League title overall.

Clare failed to win a single group stage game - finishing in the bottom position - and were relegated to Division 2 for the 2010 league.

Dublin's Alan McCrabbe was the Division 1 top scorer with 1-50.

=== Structure ===
A total of 8 teams contested the top division of the league, including all of the sides from the 2008 season that formerly took part in Divisions 1A and 1B. Due to the restructuring the 2008 Division 2 champions did not gain promotion to the top tier.

Each team played all the others in its group once, earning 2 points for a win and 1 for a draw. The first-placed teams in Division 1 contested the final.

=== Table ===
National Hurling League Final Relegated team

Pos	Team	Pld	W	D	L	Pts
1	Kilkenny (C)	7	6	0	1	12
2	Tipperary	7	6	0	1	12
3	Galway	7	4	0	3	8
4	Dublin	7	3	1	3	7
5	Waterford	7	3	0	4	6
6	Limerick	7	3	0	4	6
7	Cork	7	2	0	5	4
8	Clare (R)	7	0	1	6	1

=== Group stage ===
8 February 2009 Round 1	Limerick	3-13 - 1-18	Clare	Gaelic Grounds
	A O’Shaughnessy (2-5, 1 pen, three frees), W McNamara (1-0), D Breen (0-3), P Browne (0-2), D O’Grady (0-2), S Hickey (0-1).	Report	C Ryan (1-5, five frees), B Nugent (0-3), T Griffin (0-3), T Carmody (0-3, one free), D McMahon (0-2), A Markham (0-1), P Donnellan (0-1).	Referee: C McAllister (Cork)

8 February 2009 Round 1	Waterford	1-12 - 2-13	Tipperary	Walsh Park
	S Prendergast (0-6, three frees and two 65s), C Hennessy (1-0, free), S Molumphy (0-2), J Nagle (0-1), J Kennedy (0-1), D Shanahan (0-1), P Hurney (0-1).	Report	P Kelly (1-1), P Kerwick (1-1), W Ryan (0-4, three frees), J Woodlock (0-2), J Devane (0-2), P Maher (0-1), B Dunne (0-1), C O’Mahony (0-1, 65).	Referee: B Kelly (Westmeath)

8 February 2009 Round 1	Galway	P - P	Kilkenny	Pearse Stadium

8 February 2009 Round 1	Cork	1-14 - 4-14	Dublin	Páirc Uí Chaoimh
	B Johnson (1-6, 1-0 penalty, 0-4 frees, 0-1 ’65), A Mannix (0-2), M Collins (0-1), G O’Connor (0-1), A Ryan (0-1), D Crowley (0-1), G O’Driscoll (0-1), E Cronin (0-1).	Report	A McCrabbe (1-9, 1-0 sideline, 0-4 frees, 0-1 ‘65), L Rushe (2-1), J Kelly (1-0), D O’Reilly (0-1), D O’Callaghan (0-1), J McCaffrey (0-1), D Treacy (0-1).	Referee: J Ryan (Tipperary)

14 February 2009 Round 2	Tipperary	2-15 - 0-9	Cork	Semple Stadium
	P Bourke 0-6 (5f), J O'Brien 1-1, P Maher 1-0, J Woodlock, S Hennessy 0-2 each, J Devane, S Maher, P Kelly, G Ryan 0-1 each.	Report	B Johnson (0-7, five frees), T Murphy (0-2).	Referee: M Wadding (Waterford)

15 February 2009 Round 2	Dublin	2-21 - 0-15	Galway	Parnell Park
	A McCrabbe (0-11, five frees, 0-1 pen, one sideline cut, one 65), L Ryan (1-3), D O'Callaghan (1-0), L Rushe (0-3), J McCaffrey (0-1, free), S Lambert (0-1), P Carton (0-1), J Kelly (0-1).	Report	G Farragher (0-6 (four frees, one sideline cut), A Callanan (0-2), N Healy (0-1), S Kavanagh (0-1, free), F Healy (0-1), R Murray (0-1), D Tierney (0-1), J Gantley (0-1).	Referee: J McGrath (Westmeath)

15 February 2009 Round 2	Clare	0-13 - 0-20	Waterford	Cusack Park
	N Gilligan (0-5, three frees), B Nugent (0-3), C Ryan (0-3), J McInerney (0-1), C Morey (0-1).	Report	S Prendergast (0-5, three frees), E Kelly (0-4, one 65), K McGrath (0-4), G Hurney (0-2), S Walsh (0-2), D Shanahan (0-1), R Foley (0-1), J Nagle (0-1).	Referee: D Murphy (Wexford)

15 February 2009 Round 2	Kilkenny	0-15 - 0-14	Limerick	Nowlan Park
	R Power (0-8, six frees), E Brennan (0-2), A Fogarty (0-2), T Walsh (0-1), M Grace (0-1), M Rice (0-1).	Report	A O’Shaughnessy (0-6, four frees), D Ryan (0-3), B O’Sullivan (0-1), G O’Mahoney (0-1, a 65), G Mulcahy (0-1), M O’Brien (0-1), J O’Brien (0-1).	Referee: D Kirwan (Cork)

1 March 2009 Round 3	Limerick	1-11 - 0-12	Dublin	Gaelic Grounds
	N Moran 1-4 (0-2f), A O'Shaughnessy 0-6 (6f), B O'Sullivan 0-1.	Report	A McCrabbe 0-8 (5f, 1 '65), D O'Callaghan 0-2, S Lambert, J McCaffrey 0-1 each.	Referee: B Kelly (Westmeath)

1 March 2009 Round 3	Waterford	2-17 - 1-16	Kilkenny	Walsh Park
	K McGrath (0-9, two 65s, six frees), D Shanahan (1-1), S Prendergast (0-4, three frees), S Molumphy (1-0), S Walsh (0-1), J Nagle (0-1), E Kelly (0-1).	Report	R Power (1-7, four points frees), E Brennan (0-2), J Tennyson (0-2, one 65), E Larkin (0-1), M Grace (0-1), J Ryall (0-1), M Rice (0-1), A Fogarty (0-1).	Referee: A Stapleton (Laois)

1 March 2009 Round 3	Cork	1-11 - 4-16	Galway	Páirc Uí Chaoimh
	T Óg Murphy (0-4), S White (1-0), E Cronin (0-2), B Johnson (0-2 frees), A Mannix (0-2, one free), R O’Driscoll (0-1).	Report	A Callanan (2-1), D Tierney (1-2), C Donnellan (1-1), N Healy (0-4, one free), G Farragher (0-4, two 65s, one free), K Hynes (0-1), A Cullinane (0-1), E Forde (0-1), A Coen (0-1).	Referee: G Hoey (Clare)

1 March 2009 Round 3	Tipperary	0-23 - 0-16	Clare	Semple Stadium
	S Callinan (0-9, 7 frees), W Ryan (0-7, 4 frees), T Stapleton (0-2), N McGrath (0-2), J O’Brien (0-1), L Corbett (0-1), P Kelly (0-1).	Report	B Nugent (0-4), J Clancy (0-3), T Griffin (0-2), D McMahon (0-2), C Ryan (0-2, frees), N Gilligan (0-1), G Quinn (0-1, free), C Morey (0-1).	Referee: J Kelly (Cork)

9 March 2009 Round 1 refixture	Galway	0-12 - 1-20	Kilkenny	Pearse Stadium
	G Farrager (0-6 three frees, one 65), C Donnellan (0-2), N Healy (0-2, one free), R Murray (0-1), A Callanan (0-1).	Report	R Power (1-4, three frees), M Rice (0-4), J Tennyson (0-3), M Grace (0-2), E Larkin (0-2), B Hogan (0-1), PJ Delaney (0-1), E Brennan (0-1), M Comerford (0-1).

22 March 2009 Round 4	Dublin	0-15 - 1-11	Waterford	Parnell Park
	A McCrabbe 0-9 (four 65s, three frees), S Durkin (0-2), J Boland (0-1), D O’Callaghan (0-1), J McCaffrey (0-1), K Flynn (0-1).	Report	E Kelly 0-8 (six frees, one 65), S Molumphy (1-0), G Hurney (0-2), K McGrath (0-1).	Referee: D Murphy (Wexford)

22 March 2009 Round 4	Clare	0-16 - 2-14	Cork	Cusack Park
	C Ryan (0-8, six frees, sideline), J Clancy (0-2), D McMahon (0-1), P Vaughan (0-1), B Nugent (0-1), T Griffin (0-1), N Gilligan (0-1), T Carmody (0-1).	Report	B O’Connor (0-9, eight frees), P Horgan (2-1, 1-0 free), N McCarthy (0-1), C Naughton (0-1), K Murphy (Sarsfields, 0-1), K Murphy (Erin’s Own, 0-1).	Referee: A Kelly (Galway)

22 March 2009 Round 4	Galway	1-14 - 1-12	Limerick	Pearse Stadium
	J Canning (1-8, 0-6 frees, 0-1 sideline), A Callanan (0-3), D Tierney (0-1), J Gantley (0-1), C Donnellan (0-1).	Report	N Moran (1-7, 1-6 frees), D O’Grady (0-2), J O’Brien (0-1), D Breen (0-1), P Tobin (0-1).	Referee: S McMahon (Clare)

22 March 2009 Round 4	Kilkenny	5-17 - 1-12	Tipperary	Nowlan Park
	M Comerford (3-2), TJ Reid (1-2), R Hogan (0-5, one free), A Fogarty (1-1), R Power (0-2, frees), E Brennan (0-2), M Grace (0-1), M Rice (0-1), D Fogarty (0-1).	Report	M Webster (1-0), S Hennessy (0-3), S Callanan (0-3, two frees), J O’Brien (0-2), C O’Mahony (0-2, one free, one 65), J Woodlock (0-1), N McGrath (0-1).	Referee: C McAllister (Cork)

29 March 2009 Round 5	Tipperary	2-19 - 4-11	Dublin	Semple Stadium
	S Callanan (1-4, three frees), N McGrath (0-5), G Ryan (1-0), J O’Brien (0-3), J Woodlock (0-2), S Hennessy (0-2, both frees), C O’Mahony (0-1, one 65), S McGrath (0-1), T Scroope (0-1).	Report	D Treacy (3-2), D O’Callaghan (1-4, two frees), A McCrabbe (0-4, three frees, one sideline), S Durkan (0-1).	Referee: D O'Driscoll (Limerick)

29 March 2009 Round 5	Cork	1-20 - 2-16	Limerick	Páirc Uí Chaoimh
	B O’Connor 0-7 (six frees), J O’Connor (1-2), T Kenny (0-3), T Óg Murphy (0-2), C Naughton (0-2), K Murphy (Sarsfields) (0-1), K Murphy (Erins Own) (0-1), N Ronan (0-1), P Cronin (0-1).	Report	N Moran (0-9 five frees, one 65, one sl), P Tobin (1-1), D O’Grady (1-1), R McCarthy (0-1), A O’Shaughnessy (0-1), M O’Riordan (0-1), S Hickey (0-1), J Ryan (0-1).	Referee: J Owens (Wexford)

29 March 2009 Round 5	Clare	1-9 - 3-16	Kilkenny	Cusack Park
	C Ryan (0-6, six frees), B Nugent (1-0), M Flaherty (0-1, a free), N Gilligan (0-1, 65), T Carmody (0-1).	Report	H Shefflin (1-5, four frees, one 65), A Fogarty (2-1), R Power (0-4), E Brennan (0-2), R Hogan (0-1), E Larkin (0-1), M Rice (0-1), M Grace (0-1).	Referee: J Ryan (Tipperary)

29 March 2009 Round 5	Waterford	2-12 - 1-21	Galway	Fraher Field
	E Kelly (1-6, 0-5 frees, one 65), D Shanahan (1-0), S O’Sullivan (0-3), R Foley (0-2), S Prendergast (0-1).	Report	J Canning (0-8, three frees, three 65s, one sideline cut), C Donnellan (1-1), N Healy (0-3), A Callanan (0-3), D Tierney (0-2), A Smith (0-2), A Cullinane (0-1), N Hayes (0-1).	Referee: D Kirwan (Cork)

5 April 2009 Round 6	Dublin	0-15 - 0-15	Clare	Parnell Park
	A McCrabbe (0-9, seven frees), S Durkin (0-2), D O’Callaghan (0-2), J McCaffrey (0-1), S Hiney (0-1).	Report	N Gilligan (0-4, two frees), C Morey (0-3, all frees), P Donnellan (0-2, one free), J Clancy (0-2), T Griffin (0-1), T Carmody (0-1), C McNamara (0-1), J Conlon (0-1).	Referee: D Kirwan (Cork)

5 April 2009 Round 6	Kilkenny	4-26 - 0-11	Cork	Nowlan Park
	R Power (3-1), H Shefflin (0-9, seven frees), E Larkin (1-3), E Brennan (0-4), R Hogan (0-3), M Fennelly (0-3), M Rice (0-2), M Comerford (0-1).	Report	B O’Connor (0-5 all frees), J O’Connor (0-2), G Callanan (0-2), P Horgan (0-1), C Naughton (0-1).	Referee: M Wadding (Waterford)

5 April 2009 Round 6	Galway	1-15 - 1-17	Tipperary	Pearse Stadium
	K Hynes (0-5), J Canning (0-5, 3f, 1 65), N Healy (1-1), C Callanan (0-1), N Hayes (0-1), A Callanan (0-1), A Smith (0-1).	Report	S Callanan (0-11, 7f, 1 65), L Corbett (1-2), N McGrath (0-1), T Scroope (0-1), S Hennessy (0-1), J Woodlock (0-1).	Referee: B Kelly (Westmeath)

5 April 2009 Round 6	Limerick	2-14 - 1-13	Waterford	Gaelic Grounds
	N Moran (1-9, 0-3 frees, 0-2 65s), D Ryan (1-0), S Hickey (0-1), D Sheehan (0-1), J Ryan (0-1), G O’Mahony (0-1), J O’Brien (0-1).	Report	E Kelly (1-4, 1-2 frees), J Mullane (0-3), G Hurney (0-2), D Shanahan (0-1), S Walsh (0-1), R Foley (0-1), E McGrath (0-1).	Referee: C McAllister (Cork)

19 April 2009 Round 7	Tipperary	1-17 - 1-11	Limerick	Semple Stadium
	G Ryan (1-3), P Bourke (0-6, four frees), L Corbett (0-3), J O’Brien (0-2), T Stapleton (0-2), J Devane (0-1).	Report	N Moran (0-9, five frees), P Browne (1-0), M O’Brien (0-1), D O’Grady (0-1).	Referee: D Murphy (Wexford)

19 April 2009 Round 7	Kilkenny	1-23 - 3-15	Dublin	Nowlan Park
	H Shefflin (0-11, nine frees), E Larkin (1-3), R Hogan (0-4), TJ Reid (0-3), P Murphy (0-1), M Comerford (0-1).	Report	D O’Callaghan (2-7, six points frees, one penalty), K Flynn (1-1), J Boland (0-3), S Durkan (0-1), L Rushe (0-1), D Treacy (0-1), D Curtin (0-1, free).	Referee: B Gavin (Offaly)

19 April 2009 Round 7	Clare	0-19 - 4-16	Galway	Cusack Park
	M Flaherty (0-6, five frees), D Barrett (0-3 frees), A Markham (0-3, frees), T Carmody (0-2), J Clancy (0-1), T Griffin (0-1), G O’Connell (0-1), C McMahon (0-1), G Arthur (0-1).	Report	N Healy (2-8, 0-6 frees), I Tannian (1-2), A Callanan (1-1), D Hayes (0-3), F Healy (0-1), M Kearns (0-1, free).	Referee: J Sexton (Cork)

19 April 2009 Round 7	Cork	3-15 - 2-22	Waterford	Páirc Uí Chaoimh
	B Johnson (1-1, one free), S O’Neill (1-0), P O’Sullivan (1-0), J O’Connor (0-3), P Horgan (0-3), T Kenny (0-2), P Cronin (0-2), C Naughton (0-2), F O’Leary (0-1), J Gardiner (0-1, free).	Report	G Hurney (2-2), E Kelly (0-7, three frees, one ‘65), J Nagle (0-4), S Prendergast (0-3), J Mullane (0-3), S Molumphy (0-2), E McGrath (0-1).	Referee: J Owens (Wexford)

=== Knock-out stage ===
Final

3 May 2009 Final	Kilkenny	2-26 - 4-17 (aet)	Tipperary	Semple Stadium, Thurles
	R Hogan 1-10 (0-7f), A Fogarty 1-5, H Shefflin 0-4 (0-1f, 0-1'65), TJ Reid 0-4 (1 line ball), E Brennan 0-2, E Larkin 0-1.	Report	S Callanan 1-7 (0-6f, 0-1 '65'), N McGrath 1-5 (0-1f), J O'Brien, J Woodlock 1-1 each, S McGrath 0-2, B Cummins 0-1 (0-1 f).	Attendance: 17,087; Referee: J Sexton (Cork)

=== Top scorers ===
Overall

Rank	Player	County	Tally	Total	Matches	Average
1	Alan McCrabbe	Dublin	1-50	53	6	8.83
2	Niall Moran	Limerick	3-38	47	6	7.8
3	Richie Power	Kilkenny	5-26	41	6	6.83
4	Séamus Callanan	Tipperary	2-34	40	6	6.66
5	Eoin Kelly	Waterford	2-30	36	6	6.00
6	Henry Shefflin	Kilkenny	1-29	32	4	8.00
7	David O'Callaghan	Dublin	4-17	29	7	4.14
8	Niall Healy	Galway	3-19	28	7	4.00
9	Colin Ryan	Clare	1-24	27	6	4.50
10	Richie Hogan	Kilkenny	1-23	26	7	3.71

Single game

Rank	Player	County	Tally	Total	Opposition
1	Niall Healy	Galway	2-8	14	Clare
2	David O'Callaghan	Dublin	2-7	13	Kilkenny
2	Richie Hogan	Kilkenny	1-10	13	Tipperary
4	Niall Moran	Limerick	1-9	12	Waterford
4	Alan McCrabbe	Dublin	1-9	12	Cork
6	David Treacy	Dublin	3-2	11	Tipperary
6	Martin Comerford	Kilkenny	3-2	11	Tipperary
6	Andrew O'Shaughnessy	Limerick	2-5	11	Clare
6	Joe Canning	Galway	1-8	11	Limerick
6	Henry Shefflin	Kilkenny	0-11	11	Dublin
6	Alan McCrabbe	Dublin	0-11	11	Galway
6	Séamus Callanan	Tipperary	0-11	11	Galway

== Division 2 ==
National Hurling League Division 2
- Season: 2009
- Champions: Offaly; Captain: Ger Oakley; Manager: Johnny Dooley
- Relegated: Kerry
- Matches: 29
- Top goalscorer: Shane Dooley (8-48)
- All statistics correct as of 10 April 2017.

=== Table ===
Division 2 Final Relegated team

Pos	Team	Pld	W	D	L	Pts
1	Offaly (C, P)	7	6	0	1	12
2	Wexford	7	6	0	1	12
3	Antrim	7	4	1	2	9
4	Carlow	7	4	0	3	8
5	Laois	7	3	0	4	6
6	Westmeath	7	2	1	4	5
7	Down	7	2	0	5	4
8	Kerry (R)	7	0	0	7	0

=== Group stage ===
8 February 2009 Round 1	Kerry	1-10 - 4-21	Wexford	Austin Stack Park, Tralee
	S Brick 0-7 (3fs, 1 '65), P Flaherty 1-0, J Griffin 0-2, B Brick 0-1.	Report	R Jacob 2-2, D Lyng 0-6 (6 fs), E Quigley, N Kirwan 1-2 each, C Farrell 0-4, S Banville 0-2, D Redmond, M Tarvers, P Atkinson 0-1 each.	Referee: S McMahon (Clare)

8 February 2009 Round 1	Antrim	P-P	Westmeath	Casement Park, Belfast

8 February 2009 Round 1	Offaly	P-P	Carlow	O'Connor Park, Tullamore

8 February 2009 Round 1	Laois	P-P	Down	O'Moore Park, Portlaoise

14 February 2009 Round 2	Carlow	1-13 - 2-5	Kerry	Dr. Cullen Park, Carlow
	R Dunbar 0-7 (six frees, one pen), C Doyle 1-0, M Brennan, S Kavanagh (one free, 65) 0-2 each, R Coady, P Kehoe (0-1 each).		Michael Conway 2-0, S Brick 0-5 (four frees).

15 February 2009 Round 2	Wexford	4-22 - 1-14	Laois	Wexford Park, Wexford
	R Jacob (2-5), N Kirwan (2-1), D Lyng (0-5, four frees); S Doyle (0-3), C Farrell (0-3), D Redmond (0-1); E Quigley (0-1), S Banville (0-1), M Jacob (0-1), P Atkinson (0-1).		W Hyland (1-1); D Peacock (0-3, two frees), J Rowney (0-3), B Campion (0-2, two frees), J Phelan (0-2), J Walsh (0-1); E Jackman (0-1), Z Keenan (0-1).	Referee: N Cosgrove (Tipperary)

15 February 2009 Round 2	Westmeath	1-17 - 3-22	Offaly	Cusack Park
	B Murtagh (0-8), D McNicholas (1-3), D McCormack (0-2), P Dowdall (0-2), J Shaw (0-1), D Kilcoyne (0-1).		S Dooley (1-9), D Molloy (1-2), B Carroll (0-5), D Currams (1-1), C Parlon (0-3), J Brady (0-1), K Brady (0-1).	Referee: G Devlin (Armagh)

15 February 2009 Round 2	Down	0-15 - 1-19	Antrim	St. Patrick's Park, Portaferry
	P Braniff (0-10), B McGourty (0-2), S Wilson (0-2); A Savage (0-1).		P Shiels (0-11), B Herron (1-2), K Stewart (0-2), PJ OConnell (0-1), E McCloskey (0-1), P Doherty (0-1), J Scullion (0-1).	Referee: T Carroll (Offaly)

1 March 2009 Round 3	Antrim	4-16 - 4-12	Wexford	Casement Park, Belfast
	PJ O'Connell (2-1), P Shiels (0-6, five frees, one '65'); K Kelly (1-0, free), N McManus (1-0, pen), S Delargy (0-3), K Stewart (0-2), N McAuley (0-1), B Herron (0-1), E McCloskey (0-1); M Herron (0-1).		D Lyng (3-3, 0-2 frees); E Quigley (1-1), S Doyle (0-2), R Jacob (0-2), S Banville (0-2), D Redmond (0-1); P Arkinson (0-1).	Referee: D O'Donovan (Dublin)

1 March 2009 Round 3	Offaly	4-20 - 0-8	Kerry	O'Connor Park, Tullamore
	S Dooley (2-5, two frees, one 65), D Currams (2-4), B Carroll (0-3), K Brady (0-2), D Molloy (0-2); J Bergin (0-2), M Egan (0-1), J Brady (0-1).		S Brick (0-6, three frees), J Fitzgerald (0-2).	Referee: J Owens (Wexford)

1 March 2009 Round 3	Westmeath	4-10 - 4-18	Down	Cusack Park, Mullingar
	A Mitchell 1-3, B Murtagh 0-5, L Folan 1-0, K Cosgrove 1-0, R Jackson 1-0, E Price 0-1, C Curley 0-1.		P Braniff 1-8, K Courtney 2-0, E Clarke 0-5, S Clarke 1-0, S Wilson 0-3, K McGarry 0-1, C Coulter 0-1.	Referee: S Whelan (Wexford)

1 March 2009 Round 3	Laois	3-12 - 2-11	Carlow	O'Moore Park, Portlaoise
	O Holohan 2-2, J Young 0-5, W Hyland 1-0, J Phelan 0-3, J Rowney 0-1, Z Keenan 0-1.		R Dunbar 1-8, C Hughes 1-1, R Foley 0-1, M Brennan 0-1.	Referee: J O'Mahony (Limerick)

8 March 2009 Round 1 refixture	Antrim	0-15 - 0-15	Westmeath	Casement Park, Belfast
	K Stewart 0-8, B Herron 0-3, M Herron 0-2, K McKeegan 0-1, C Duffin 0-1.		A Mitchell 0-3, D McNicholas 0-2, B Murtagh 0-2, C Curley 0-2, J Shaw 0-1, P Dowdall 0-1, B Connaughton 0-1, B Smyth 0-1, D McCormack 0-1, K Cosgrove 0-1.	Referee: F Smith (Meath)

8 March 2009 Round 1 refixture	Offaly	1-17 - 0-6	Carlow	O'Connor Park, Tullamore
	S Dooley 1-11, D Currams 0-3, J Bergin 0-2, D Molloy 0-1.		R Dunbar 0-4, C Doyle 0-1, D Byrne 0-1.	Referee: D Connolly (Kilkenny)

8 March 2009 Round 1 refixture	Laois	1-13 - 0-10	Down	O'Moore Park, Portlaoise
	Z Keenan 0-4, J Walsh 1-0, J Young 0-3, J Rowney 0-2, W Hyland 0-1, J Phelan 0-1, O Holohan 0-1, M McEvoy 0-1.		S Wilson 0-3, A Savage 0-2, P Braniff 0-2, C Coulter 0-1, A Higgins 0-1, J Coyle 0-1.	Referee: D O'Driscoll (Limerick)

22 March 2009 Round 4	Kerry	0-12 - 0-17	Laois	Lerrig Sportsfield, Ardfert
	S Brick 0-7, R Kenny 0-2, J Casey 0-1, J McCarthy 0-1, M Conway 0-1.		J Young 0-8, W Hyland 0-6, John Walsh 0-1, T Fitzgerald 0-1, James Walsh 0-1.	Referee: G Hoey (Clare)

22 March 2009 Round 4	Down	0-14 - 2-21	Offaly	McKenna Park, Ballycran
	P Braniff 0-5, S Wilson 0-5, E Clarke 0-2, F Conway 0-1, C Woods 0-1.		S Dooley 2-1, B Carroll 0-6, J Bergin 0-4, C Parlon 0-3, R Hanniffy 0-2, D Currams 0-2, M Mahon 0-1, C Coughlan 0-1, D Molloy 0-1.	Referee: D O'Donovan (Dublin)

22 March 2009 Round 4	Wexford	3-15 - 2-14	Westmeath	Wexford Park, Wexford
	R Jacob 2-1, P Carley 0-7, S Doyle 1-1, A Shore 0-3, S Banville 0-2, P Atkinson 0-1.		B Murtagh 2-6, D McNicholas 0-2, D McCormack 0-2, B Smyth 0-2, A Mitchell 0-1, C Curley 0-1.	Referee: M Wadding (Waterford)

22 March 2009 Round 4	Carlow	3-12 - 1-15	Antrim	Dr. Cullen Park, Carlow
	P Kehoe 0-6, C Doyle 1-2, R Foley 1-1, D Roberts 1-0, R Dunbar 0-2, A Gaul 0-1.		P Shiels 0-7, N McManus 1-1, K Kelly 0-2, S McNaughton 0-2, P Richmond 0-1, C Herron 0-1, B Herron 0-1.	Referee: P Casey (Waterford)

28 March 2009 Round 5	Westmeath	1-15 - 2-15	Carlow	Cusack Park, Mullingar
	B Murtagh 0-6, A Mitchell 0-4, D McCormack 1-0, B Smyth 0-2, C Curley 0-1, D McNicholas 0-1, B Connaughton 0-1.		R Foley 1-1, E Byrne 1-1, C Doyle 0-3, P Keogh 0-3, A GAul 0-2, S Kavanagh 0-2, D Roberts 0-2, R Dunbar 0-1.	Referee: T Carroll (Offaly)

29 March 2009 Round 5	Down	0-12 - 2-19	Wexford	St. Patrick's Park, Ballygalget
	S Wilson 0-4, P Braniff 0-3, C Woods 0-1, K McGarry 0-1, S Ennis 0-1, A Savage 0-1, M Ennis 0-1.		P Carley 0-9, R Jacob 0-5, S Banville 1-0, A Shore 1-0, C Farrell 0-2, D Redmond 0-1, D Lyng 0-1, M Jacob 0-1.	Referee: B Gavin (Offaly)

29 March 2009 Round 5	Antrim	3-19 - 4-14	Kerry	Casement Park, Belfast
	K Stewart 0-9, N McManus 1-1, B Herron 0-4, J Scullion 1-0, K Kelly 1-0, P Doherty 0-2, S McNaughton 0-1, C Herron 0-1, PJ O'Connell 0-1.		S Brick 0-8, J Casey 1-1, P Flaherty 1-1, M Conway 1-0, G O'Brien 1-0, J Griffin 0-1, J Godley 0-1, J Fitzgerald 0-1, C Harris 0-1.	Referee: G Devlin (Armagh)

29 March 2009 Round 5	Offaly	4-14 - 1-10	Laois	O'Connor Park, Tullamore
	S Dooley 2-7, C Parlon 2-1, B Carroll 0-3, J Bergin 0-1, D Molloy 0-1, D Currams 0-1.		J Young 0-6, JE Delaney 1-0, J Walsh 0-2, W Hyland 0-1, J Purcell 0-1.	Referee: J Kelly (Wexford)

5 April 2009 Round 6	Carlow	3-18 - 2-11	Down	Dr. Cullen Park, Carlow
	P Kehoe 1-7, R Foley 2-1, R Dunbar 0-4, C Doyle 0-3, E Byrne 0-2, J Rogers 0-1.		P Braniff 2-5, S Wilson 0-3, K McGarry 0-1.	Referee: T McIntyre (Antrim)

5 April 2009 Round 6	Kerry	2-11 - 0-18	Westmeath	Austin Stack Park, Tralee
	M Conway 1-5, J McCarthy 1-0, J Casey 0-2, J Egan 0-1, L Boyle 0-1, JM Dooley 0-1, C Harris 0-1.		B Murtagh 0-7, D McCormack 0-3, D McNicholas 0-2, P Dowdall 0-2, C Curley 0-1, D Carty 0-1, A Mitchell 0-1, D Shaw 0-1.	Referee: J O'Mahony (Limerick)

5 April 2009 Round 6	Wexford	5-14 - 0-17	Offaly	Wexford Park, Wexford
	D Lyng 1-4, D Redmond 2-0, S Banville 1-2, R Jacob 1-1, P Carley 0-3, S Nolan 0-1, C Farrell 0-1, S Doyle 0-1, A Shore 0-1.		S Dooley 0-7, B Carroll 0-2, C Parlon 0-2, J Bergin 0-2, K Brady 0-1, R Hanniffy 0-1, D Molloy 0-1, D Currams 0-1.	Referee: E Morris (Dublin)

5 April 2009 Round 6	Laois	0-18 - 2-18	Antrim	O'Moore Park, Portlaoise
	J Young 0-9, D Peacock 0-4, W Hyland 0-2, O Holohan 0-1, J Walsh 0-1, T Fitzgerald 0-1.		K Stewart 1-6, P Shiels 0-7, N McManus 1-1, J Scullion 0-1, B Herron 0-1, S Delargy 0-1, PJ O'Connell 0-1.	Referee: T Ryan (Tipperary)

19 April 2009 Round 7	Down	1-23 - 4-5	Kerry	McKenna Park, Ballycran
	P Braniff 0-10, J Coyle 1-3, S Wilson 0-3; S Clarke 0-3, E Clarke 0-2, G Johnson 0-1, A Higgins 0-1.		J McCarthy 2-1, JM Dooley 1-4, J Griffin 1-0.	Referee: O Elliott (Antrim)

19 April 2009 Round 7	Wexford	6-21 - 0-14	Carlow	Wexford Park, Wexford
	P Kenny 3-3, R Jacob 1-4, S Banville 1-1, P Carley 0-4, D Lyng 1-0, A Shore 0-3, D Redmond 0-2, S Doyle 0-2, P Atkinson 0-1, C Kenny 0-1.		Paudie Kehoe 0-7, R Dunbar 0-2, C Doyle 0-2, R Foley 0-1, R Coady 0-1, M Brennan 0-1.	Referee: A Stapleton (Laois)

19 April 2009 Round 7	Offaly	1-18 - 0-13	Antrim	O'Connor Park, Tullamore
	B Carroll 0-5, B Murphy 0-4, J Bergin 0-4, D Molloy 1-0, S Dooley 0-3, K Brady 0-1, C Parlon 0-1.		K Stewart 0-6, P McGill 0-2, S Delargy 0-1, E McCloskey 0-1, B Herron 0-1, M Herron 0-1, J Scullion 0-1.	Referee: S McMahon (Clare)

19 April 2009 Round 7	Westmeath	2-17 - 1-14	Laois	Cusack Park, Mullingar
	B Murtagh 0-7, A Devine 1-1, D McNicholas 1-1, K Cosgrove 0-2, J Shaw 0-2, C Curley 0-1; D McCormack 0-1, P Dowdall 0-1, B Connaughton 0-1.		D Peacock 0-7, B Campion 1-0, J Walsh 0-2; J Phelan 0-2, B Dunne 0-1; T Fitzgerald 0-1, S Dwyer 0-1.	Referee: F Smith (Meath)

=== Knock-out stage ===
Final

3 May 2009 Final	Offaly	1−13 − 0−13	Wexford	Semple Stadium, Thurles
	S Dooley (0-5 frees), D Currams (1-1), B Carroll (0-3), D Molloy (0-3); P Cleary (0-1 free).	Report	P Carley (0-4, 3 frees, 1 '65), S Banville (0-2), D Lyng (0-2 line balls); P Kenny (0-1), A Shore (0-1), M Travers (0-1), D Redmond (0-1), R Jacob (0-1).	Referee: G Hoey (Clare)

=== Scoring statistics ===
Top scorers overall

Rank	Player	Team	Tally	Total	Matches	Average
1	Shane Dooley	Offaly	8-48	72	8	9.00
2	Paul Braniff	Down	3-43	52	7	7.42
3	Brendan Murtagh	Westmeath	2-41	47	7	6.71
4	Rory Jacob	Wexford	8-21	45	8	5.62
5	Diarmuid Lyng	Wexford	5-21	36	8	4.50
5	Karl Stewart	Antrim	1-33	36	6	6.00
7	Shane Brick	Kerry	0-33	33	5	6.60
8	Ruairí Dunbar	Carlow	1-28	31	7	4.42
8	Paul Shiels	Antrim	0-31	31	4	7.75
8	James Young	Laois	0-31	31	5	6.20

Top scorers in a single game

Rank	Player	Team	Tally	Total	Opposition
1	Shane Dooley	Offaly	1-11	14	Carlow
2	Shane Dooley	Offaly	2-07	13	Laois
3	Diarmuid Lyng	Wexford	3-03	12	Antrim
3	Pat Kenny	Wexford	3-03	12	Carlow
3	Brendan Murtagh	Westmeath	2-06	12	Wexford
3	Shane Dooley	Offaly	1-09	12	Westmeath
7	Rory Jacob	Wexford	2-05	11	Laois
7	Shane Dooley	Offaly	2-05	11	Kerry
7	Paul Braniff	Down	2-05	11	Carlow
7	Paul Braniff	Down	1-08	11	Westmeath
7	Ruairí Dunbar	Carlow	1-08	11	Laois
7	Paul Shiels	Antrim	0-11	11	Down

== Division 3A ==
Division 3A Final Relegated team

Pos	Team	Pld	W	D	L	F	A	Diff	Pts
1	Meath	5	4	1	0	6-85	7-65	17	9
2	Kildare (C, P)	5	3	0	2	5-75	5-66	9	6
3	Derry	5	2	1	2	6-67	6-54	13	5
4	Armagh	5	2	1	2	6-56	6-62	-6	5
5	Mayo	5	2	0	3	5-50	1-70	-8	4
6	Wicklow (R)	5	0	1	4	5-65	8-81	-25	1

=== Final ===
Meath	1−18 − 2−18	Kildare

Venue: Kingspan Breffni Park
Referee: T. Carroll (Offaly)

Kildare won promotion to Division Two for 2010 while Meath remained in Division Three for 2010

== Division 3B ==
Division 3B Final Relegated team

Pos	Team	Pld	W	D	L	F	A	Diff	Pts
1	London (C, P)	6	6	0	0	23-103	4-60	100	12
2	Roscommon	6	4	0	2	12-105	11-61	47	8
3	Fingal	6	4	0	2	13-84	10-81	12	8
4	Louth	6	3	0	3	9-90	5-72	30	6
5	Donegal	6	3	0	3	7-88	12-88	-15	6
6	Tyrone	6	1	0	5	3-59	16-105	-85	2
7	Longford (R)	6	0	0	6	8-52	17-114	-89	0

=== Final ===
London	2−19 − 2−13	Roscommon

Venue: Páirc Tailteann
Referee: O. Elliot (Antrim)

London won promotion to Division Three A for 2010 while Roscommon remained in Division Three B for 2010

== Division 4 ==
Division 4 Final

Pos	Team	Pld	W	D	L	F	A	Diff	Pts
1	Monaghan	5	4	0	1	7-53	9-46	1	8
2	Sligo (C, P)	5	3	1	1	6-73	7-44	26	7
3	Leitrim	5	2	1	2	3-65	4-62	0	5
4	Fermanagh	5	2	1	2	9-57	6-67	-1	5
5	South Down	5	0	3	2	9-46	6-64	-9	3
6	Cavan	5	1	0	4	7-50	9-61	-17	2

=== Final ===
Monaghan	2−8 − 1−13 aet	Sligo

Venue: Pearse Park
Referee: C. Maher (Dublin)

Sligo won promotion to Division Three B for 2010 while Monaghan remained in Division Four for 2010

== Promotion and relegation ==
Promotion and relegation for 2009
	Promoted	Relegated
Division One	–	Clare
Division Two	Offaly	Kerry
Division Three A	Kildare	Wicklow
Division Three B	London	Longford
Division Four	Sligo	–
