= 2007 All-Ireland Under-21 Hurling Championship =

All-Ireland Under-21 Hurling Championship 2007
Championship Details
- Dates: 30 May 2007 – 9 September 2007
- Teams: 16

All Ireland Champions
- Winners: Galway (9th win)
- Captain: Kevin Hynes
- Manager: Vincent Mullins

All Ireland Runners-up
- Runners-up: Dublin
- Captain: Finn McGarry
- Manager: Seán Lane

Provincial Champions
- Munster: Cork
- Leinster: Dublin
- Ulster: Derry
- Connacht: Not Played

Championship Statistics
- Matches Played: 14
- Top Scorer: Alan McCrabbe (2-35)

The 2007 All-Ireland Under-21 Hurling Championship was the 44th staging of the All-Ireland Under-21 Hurling Championship since its establishment by the Gaelic Athletic Association in 1964.

Kilkenny were the defending champions, however, they were beaten by Offaly in the Leinster semi-final.

On 8 September 2007, Galway won the championship following a 5-11 to 0-12 defeat of Dublin in the All-Ireland final. This was their 9th All-Ireland title in the under-21 grade and their second in three championship seasons.

Dublin's Alan McCrabbe was the championship's top scorer with 2-35.

== Results ==
=== Leinster Under-21 Hurling Championship ===
Quarter-finals

30 May 2007 Quarter-final	Kildare	2-7 - 2-12	Dublin	Conneff Park
	E Fitzpatrick (1-0), C Ryan (1-0), O Lynch (0-2, 1f), C Mac Suibhne (0-2, 2slb), M Maloney (0-1f), J Houlihan (0-1), P Divilley (0-1).	Report	A McCrabbe (2-5, 4f), R O'Carroll (0-2), J McCaffrey (0-1, f), K Dunne (0-1), S Durkin (0-1), M McGarry (0-1), P Carton (0-1).	Referee: F Smith (Meath)

30 May 2007 Quarter-final	Kilkenny	1-18 - 1-13	Laois	Nowlan Park
	E Guinan (0-8, 0-6 frees), R Hogan (1-3), P Hartley (0-2), M Ruth (0-2), R Dollard (0-1, 65), G Nolan (0-1), M Aylward (0-1).	Report	D Bergin (0-7, all frees), J Phelan (1-2), W Hyland (0-2), J O'Loughlin (0-1), S Burke (0-1).	Referee: F Devereux (Clare)

Semi-finals

20 June 2007 Semi-final	Dublin	3-12 - 2-14	Wexford	Parnell Park
	A McCrabbe (0-7, 6f, one 65), P Carton (1-1), D O'Dwyer (1-0), D Connolly (1-0), R O'Carroll (0-2), E Moran (0-1), K Dunne (0-1).	Report	G Sinnott (2-0), N Kirwan (0-5, all frees), PJ Nolan (0-4), R Kehoe (0-2, 2f), C Lawler (0-1), T Dwyer (0-1), B O'Connor (0-1).	Referee: R O'Holohan (Kildare)

20 June 2007 Semi-final	Kilkenny	0-13 - 1-13	Offaly	Nowlan Park
	R Hogan (0-6, four frees, 1 65), P Hartley (0-2), TJ Reid (0-2), E O'Donoghue (0-1), E Guinan (0-1), M Aylward (0-1).	Report	D Horan (0-5, three frees), A Egan (1-1), S Dooley (0-3), C Parlon (0-2), B Leonard (0-1), J Bergin (0-1).	Referee: S Whelan (Wexford

Final

18 July 2007 Final	Dublin	2-18 - 3-9	Offaly	Parnell Park
	A McCrabbe (0-9, five frees, one 65), P Carton (1-2), R O'Carroll (1-0), J McCaffrey (0-2), T Brady (0-1), D Connolly (0-1), S Lehane (0-1), D O'Dwyer (0-1), S Durkin (0-1).	Report	J Bergin (1-1), A Egan (1-0), D Molloy (1-0), C Slevin (0-3), S Dooley (0-2), D Horan (0-2, one free), S Ryan (0-1).	Referee: S Whelan (Wexford)

=== Munster Under-21 Hurling Championship ===
Quarter-final

6 June 2007 Quarter-final	Cork	1-14 - 2-10	Tipperary	Páirc Uí Chaoimh
	P Cronin (0-5, three frees, one 65), L Desmond (0-4), E Murphy (1-0), B Moylan (0-1), E Cadogan (0-1 free), P Horgan (0-1), S Moylan (0-1), C Naughton (0-1).	Report	S Lillis (1-1), D Egan (0-4, two frees, one sideline), T Dalton (1-0), P Bourke (0-3), J Woodlock (0-1), T McGrath (0-1),	Referee: A Heagney (Clare)

Semi-finals

11 July 2007 Semi-final	Limerick	2-10 - 2-14	Waterford	Gaelic Grounds
	E Ryan 1-6, M Fitzgerald 1-1, David Moloney 0-1, C Mullane 0-1, A Brennan 0-1.		M Gorman 1-7, K Moran 0-4, S Walsh 1-0, P Kearney 0-1, J O'Farrell 0-1, M Fives 0-1.	Referee: J Ryan (Tipperary)

17 July 2007 Semi-final	Cork	2-14 - 1-11	Clare	Semple Stadium
	P Cronin 0-7, C Naughton 0-4, J Halbert 1-0, K O'Halloran 1-0, L Desmond 0-2, A Mannix 0-1.		D Browne 0-4, C Ryan 1-0, B Gaffney 0-2, C O'Donovan 0-1, G Arthur 0-1, G O'Donnell 0-1, E Barrett 0-1, P Kelly 0-1.	Referee: J O'Mahoney (Limerick)

Final

1 August 2007 Final	Cork	1-20 - 0-10	Waterford	Walsh Park
	C Naughton (1-4), A Mannix (0-3), L Desmond (0-3), C O'Neill (0-2), E Cadogan (0-2, 1 free), P Cronin (0-2f), P Horgan (0-2), K Canty (0-1), E Murphy (0-1).	Report	M Gorman (0-6, 5 frees, 1 65), P Kearney (0-2), R Foley (0-1), K Moran (0-1),	Referee: J Ryan (Tipperary)

=== Ulster Under-21 Hurling Championship ===
Semi-final

18 July 2007 Semi-final	Down	0-11 - 3-24	Antrim	McKenna Park
	E Magennis 0-3, M O’Prey 0-2, G Burns 0-2, S Keith 0-1, S Ennis 0-1, B Ennis 0-1, C McCarthy 0-1,		P Doherty 1-7, S McDonnell 2-3, E McCloskey 0-6, P McGill 0-2, C McAllister 0-2, S McCrory 0-2, C Duffin 0-1, C McFall 0-1.	Referee: E Hasson (Derry)

Final

1 August 2007 Final	Antrim	1-18 - 2-16	Derry	Casement Park
	P Shields (0-6), P Doherty (1-2), C McFall (0-2), N McManus (0-2), S McNaughton (0-2), C Duffin (0-1), E McCloskey (0-1), S McDonnell (0-1), D Donnelly (0-1).	Report	SL McGoldrick (2-1), G O'Kane (0-4), M Kirkpatrick (0-3), P Henry (0-3), O McCloskey (0-2), B Dodds (0-1), S Dodds (0-1), K O'Neill (0-1).	Referee: T Mahon (Fermanagh)

=== All-Ireland Under-21 Hurling Championship ===
Semi-finals

18 August 2007 Semi-final	Dublin	3-18 - 2-11	Derry	Páirc Esler
	D O'Dwyer (2-2), J McCaffrey (0-5), A McCrabbe (0-5), P Carton (1-1), R O'Carroll (0-2), E Moran (0-1), D Connolly (0-1), J Boland (0-1).	Report	S McGoldrick (1-2), P Henry (0-5, 65 and three frees), S Dodds (1-1), O McCluskey (0-2), G O'Kane (0-1).	Referee: A Stapleton (Laois)

25 August 2007 Semi-final	Galway	4-21 - 2-18	Cork	Semple Stadium
	K Wade (1-6, four frees), J Canning (0-7, two sideline cuts), C Kavanagh (1-1), F Coone (1-0), B Hanley (1-0), K Hynes (0-3), S Glynn (0-2), K Kilkenny (0-1), N Kelly (0-1).	Report	P Cronin (0-7, frees), P Horgan (1-3), C O'Neill (1-0), C Naughton (0-3), S O'Neill (0-1), L Desmond (0-1), K Canty (0-1), E Murphy (0-1), S White (0-1).	Referee: S McGrath (Westmeath)

Final

8 September 2007 Final	Galway	5-11 - 0-12	Dublin	Croke Park
	K Wade (1-4, 2f), C Kavanagh (2-0), N Kelly (1-1), S Glynn (1-0), J Canning (0-3, 1f), F Coone (0-2), K Kilkenny (0-1).	Report	A McCrabbe (0-9, 6f, 1 '65', 1 sl), J McCaffrey (0-1), D Connolly (0-1), P Carton (0-1).	Referee: J Ryan (Tipperary)

== Top scorers ==
Overall

Rank	Player	County	Tally	Total	Matches	Average
1	Alan McCrabbe	Dublin	2-35	41	5	8.20
2	Patrick Cronin	Cork	0-21	21	4	5.25
3	Kerril Wade	Galway	2-10	16	2	8.00
3	Marcus Gorman	Waterford	1-13	16	2	8.00
5	Peadar Carton	Dublin	3-6	15	5	3.00
5	Paddy Doherty	Antrim	2-9	15	2	7.50
5	Cathal Naughton	Cork	1-12	15	4	3.75
8	Sean Leo McGoldrick	Derry	3-3	12	2	6.00
8	Declan O'Dwyer	Dublin	3-3	12	4	3.00
8	Richie Hogan	Kilkenny	1-9	12	2	6.00

Single game

Rank	Player	County	Tally	Total	Opposition
1	Alan McCrabbe	Dublin	2-5	11	Kildare
2	Paddy Doherty	Antrim	1-7	10	Down
2	Marcus Gorman	Waterford	1-7	10	Limerick
4	S McDonnell	Antrim	2-3	9	Down
4	Kerril Wade	Galway	1-6	9	Cork
4	Eoin Ryan	Limerick	1-6	9	Waterford
4	Alan McCrabbe	Dublin	0-9	9	Offaly
4	Alan McCrabbe	Dublin	0-9	9	Galway
9	Declan O'Dwyer	Dublin	2-2	8	Derry
9	Eoin Guinan	Kilkenny	0-8	8	Laois

== Championship statistics ==
=== Miscellaneous ===
- Derry win the Ulster title for the first time since 1997.
- Dublin reach the All-Ireland final for the first time since 1972.
