= 2010 National Hurling League =

79th season of the National Hurling League

League details
- Dates: 20 February – 2 May 2010
- Teams: 35

League champions
- Winners: Galway (9th win)
- Captain: Shane Kavanagh
- Manager: John McIntyre

League runners-up
- Runners-up: Cork
- Captain: Kieran Murphy
- Manager: Denis Walsh

Other division winners
- Division 2: Wexford
- Division 3A: Kerry
- Division 3B: Wicklow
- Division 4: Monaghan

The 2010 National Hurling League (known as the Allianz National Hurling League for sponsorship reasons) was the 79th season of the National Hurling League. 35 teams competed in the league.

Galway were the champions, defeating Cork in the final.

== Teams ==
=== Team summaries ===
Team	Stadium	Manager	Position last season
Kilkenny	Nowlan Park	Brian Cody	1st
Tipperary	Semple Stadium	Liam Sheedy	2nd
Galway	Pearse Stadium	John McIntyre	3rd
Dublin	Parnell Park	Anthony Daly	4th
Waterford	Walsh Park	Davy Fitzgerald	5th
Limerick	Gaelic Grounds	Justin McCarthy	6th
Cork	Páirc Uí Chaoimh	Denis Walsh	7th
Offaly	O'Connor Park	Joe Dooley	1st in Division 2 (promoted)

== Format ==
The 2010 format of the National Hurling League is a system consisting of five divisions. There are thirty-five teams competing: Divisions One and Two have eight teams in each, Division Three A contains six, Division Three B seven, and there are six teams in Division Four.

=== Division 1 ===
Division 1 contains eight teams. Each team plays all the others once. The top two play the final; the winners of the final are the 2010 NHL champions. The last-placed team is relegated.

=== Division 2 ===
Division 2 contains eight teams. Each team plays all the others once. The top two play the final; the winners of the final are the 2010 Division Two champions and are promoted. The last-placed team is relegated to Division 3A.

=== Division 3A ===
Division 3A contains six teams. The top two teams shall contest the final; the winners of the final are the 2010 Division Three champions and are promoted. The last-placed team is relegated to Division 3B.

=== Division 3B ===
Division 3B contains seven teams. The top two teams shall contest the final; the winners of the final are the 2010 Division 3B champions and are promoted to Division 3A. The last-placed team is relegated.

=== Division 4 ===
Division 4 contains six teams. Each team plays all the others once. The top two play the final; the winners of the final are the 2010 Division Four champions and are promoted to Division 3B.

== Division 1 ==
National Hurling League Division 1
- Season: 2010
- Champions: Galway; 9th National League title Captain: Shane Kavanagh; Manager: John McIntyre
- Relegated: Limerick
- Matches: 29
- Top goalscorer: Shane Dooley (6-57)
- Biggest home win: Dublin 6-30 - 2-11 Limerick (18 April 2010)
- Biggest away win: Tipperary 2-24 - 0-8 Limerick (21 March 2010)
- Highest scoring: Dublin 6-30 - 2-11 Limerick (18 April 2010)
- All statistics correct as of 11 April 2017.

Kilkenny came into the season as defending champions of the 2009 season. Offaly entered Division 1 as the promoted team.

On 2 May 2010, Galway won the title following a 2–22 to 1–17 win over Cork in the final. It was their first league title since 2004 and their 9th National League title overall.

Limerick, who lost all of their group stage matches, were relegated from Division 1. Wexford won Division 2 and secured promotion to the top tier.

Offaly's Shane Dooley was the Division 1 top scorer with 6-57.

=== Table ===
National Hurling League Final

Relegated team

Team	Pld	W	D	L	Pts
Galway (C)	7	6	0	1	12
Cork	7	5	1	1	11
Tipperary	7	4	1	2	9
Kilkenny	7	4	0	3	8
Waterford	7	3	2	2	8
Offaly	7	2	0	5	4
Dublin	7	2	0	5	4
Limerick (R)	7	0	0	7	0

- Kilkenny were placed ahead of Waterford as they won the head-to-head match between the teams.
- Offaly were placed ahead of Dublin as they won the head-to-head match between the teams.

=== Group stage ===
20 February 2010; 7:30 p.m.	Tipperary	Postponed	Kilkenny	Semple Stadium, Thurles

21 February 2010; 2:30 p.m. Round 2	Limerick	1–11 – 1–18	Galway	Kilmallock; Referee: C. McAllister (Cork).
21 February 2010; 2:30 p.m. Round 2	A O'Connor 0-6 (4f, 1 65), C Mullane 1-0, G Mulcahy, B O'Sullivan 0-2 each, P McNamara 0-1.	Report	G Farragher 0-6 (0-3f, 0-1 sl), I Tannian 1-2, C Donnellan 0-3, N Cahalan 0-2, T Og Regan (0-1f), D Burke, N Hayes, N Healy, A Harte 0-1 each.	Kilmallock; Referee: C. McAllister (Cork).

21 February 2010; 2:30 p.m. Round 2	Cork	1–22 – 1–11	Offaly	Páirc Uí Chaoimh, Cork; Referee: M. Wadding (Waterford).
21 February 2010; 2:30 p.m. Round 2	P Horgan 0-9 (0-5f), J Gardiner 0-5 (0-4f), K Murphy 0-4, A Ó hAilpín 1-0, N McCarthy 0-2, M O'Sullivan, M Cussen 0-1 each.	Report	S Dooley 1-8 (0-6f, 0-1 65), B Carroll, C Mahon, C Parlon 0-1 each.	Páirc Uí Chaoimh, Cork; Referee: M. Wadding (Waterford).

21 February 2010; 2:30 p.m.	Waterford	4–13 – 0–12	Dublin	Walsh Park, Waterford; Referee: D. Kirwan (Cork).
21 February 2010; 2:30 p.m.	K Moran 1-5, M Shanahan 0-6 (0-3f, 0-2 '65), S Molumphy 1-1, S Walsh, G Hurney 1-0 each, J Nagle 0-1	Report	A McCrabbe 0-5 (0-4f), D Treacy 0-3, L Rushe, S Durkan, K Flynn, P Ryan (0-1f) 0-1 each	Walsh Park, Waterford; Referee: D. Kirwan (Cork).

23 February 2010; 7:00 p.m.	Tipperary	Postponed	Kilkenny	Semple Stadium, Thurles

27 February 2010; 7:30 p.m. Round 2	Limerick	1–14 – 2–21	Cork	Gaelic Grounds, Limerick; Referee: J. McGrath (Westmeath)
27 February 2010; 7:30 p.m. Round 2	T O'Brien 1-2 (0-2f), A O'Connor 0-4 (0-3f, 0-1 65), N Quaid, P Browne, B O'Sullivan 0-2 each, P McNamara, G Mulcahy 0-1 each.	Report	M Cussen 1-5, P Horgan 0-6 (0-4f), J Gardiner 0-4 (0-2 '65, 0-1f), C McCarthy 1-1, K Murphy 0-2, G Callinan, M O'Sullivan, N McCarthy 0-1 each.	Gaelic Grounds, Limerick; Referee: J. McGrath (Westmeath)

28 February 2010; 2:30 p.m. Round 2	Kilkenny	1–17 – 0–12	Offaly	Nowlan Park, Kilkenny; Attendance: 2,820; Referee: J. Ryan (Tipperary).
28 February 2010; 2:30 p.m. Round 2	R Power 0-8 (0-6f, 1'65), A Fogarty 1-1, M Rice 0-3, R Hogan 0-2 (0-2f), PJ Delaney, M Grace, J Mulhall 0-1 each.	Report	S Dooley 0-9 (0-7f, 1'65), R Hannify, G Healion, D Hayden 0-1 each.	Nowlan Park, Kilkenny; Attendance: 2,820; Referee: J. Ryan (Tipperary).

28 February 2010; 2:30 p.m. Round 2	Galway	4–15 – 1–15	Waterford	Pearse Stadium, Galway; Referee: B. Gavin (Offaly)
28 February 2010; 2:30 p.m. Round 2	I Tannian 2-2, A Harte, N Healy 1-1 each, J Gantley 0-4, G Farragher 0-3 (0-2f), N Cahalan 0-2, A Callanan, D Collins 0-1 each.	Report	M Shanahan 0-9 (0-7f), S Walsh 1-1, R Foley 0-2, J Nagle, S Molumphy, T Connors 0-1 each.	Pearse Stadium, Galway; Referee: B. Gavin (Offaly)

28 February 2010; 2:30 p.m. Round 2	Dublin	1–21 – 1–12	Tipperary	Parnell Park, Donnycarney; Referee: J. Owens (Wexford).
28 February 2010; 2:30 p.m. Round 2	A McCrabbe 0-10 (0-8f, 0-1 65), J McCaffrey 1-1, S Durkin, P Kelly 0-2 each, L Rushe, M OBrien, S Lambert, D Tracey, K Flynn 0-1 each	Report	E Kelly 1-5 (1-0 pen, 0-2f, 0-1 65), S Callinan 0-2, B Dunne, S Hennessy, N McGrath, L Corbett, D Fanning 0-1 each	Parnell Park, Donnycarney; Referee: J. Owens (Wexford).

7 March 2010; 2:30 p.m.	Tipperary	1-14 - 0-13	Kilkenny	Semple Stadium, Thurles; Attendance: 20,254; Referee: B. Kelly (Westmeath)
7 March 2010; 2:30 p.m.	E Kelly 1-7 (0-6f), S McGrath 0-2, L Corbett 0-2, N McGrath, J O'Brien, J Brennan 0-1 each	Report	J Tennyson 0-3, J Mulhall 0-3, R Hogan 0-3 (0-3f), E Larkin, M Rice, T Walsh, J Tyrell 0-1 each	Semple Stadium, Thurles; Attendance: 20,254; Referee: B. Kelly (Westmeath)

14 March 2010; 2:30 p.m.	Tipperary	2-17 - 0-14	Galway	Semple Stadium, Thurles; Referee: J. Sexton (Cork)
14 March 2010; 2:30 p.m.	E Kelly 0-5 (0-4f), L Corbett 0-4, S Callanan 0-4, N McGrath 1-1, J O'Brien 1-0, T Hammersley 0-2, S McGrath 0-1	Report	G Farragher 0-5 (0-4f), C Donnellan, A Callanan, I Tannian 0-2 each, A Harte, N Cahalan, J Gantley 0-1 each.	Semple Stadium, Thurles; Referee: J. Sexton (Cork)

14 March 2010; 2:30 p.m.	Cork	0-18 - 1-13	Kilkenny	Páirc Uí Chaoimh, Cork; Referee: D. Murphy (Wexford)
14 March 2010; 2:30 p.m.	J Gardiner 0-7 (0-3f, 2'65), P Horgan 0-4 (0-2f), N McCarthy 0-2, P O'Sullivan 0-2, T Kenny, C Naughton, J O'Connor, 0-1 each.	Report	R Power 0-7 (0-5f), J Mulhall 1-3, M Grace 0-2, E Larkin 0-1	Páirc Uí Chaoimh, Cork; Referee: D. Murphy (Wexford)

14 March 2010; 2:30 p.m.	Offaly	3-19 - 1-18	Dublin	O'Connor Park, Tullamore; Referee: A. Stapleton (Laois)
14 March 2010; 2:30 p.m.	S Dooley 2-10 (0-6f, 3'65), J Bergin 1-2, B Carroll 0-3, D Molloy 0-2, D Currams, J Brady 0-1 each	Report	J McCaffrey 0-6 (1'65), A McCrabbe 0-5 (0-4f), L Rushe 1-0, S Durkin, L Ryan 0-2, D Treacy, P Kelly, S Hiney 0-1 each	O'Connor Park, Tullamore; Referee: A. Stapleton (Laois)

14 March 2010; 2:30 p.m.	Waterford	2-20 - 2-10	Limerick	Fraher Field, Dungarvan; Referee: J. Ryan (Tipperary)
14 March 2010; 2:30 p.m.	E Kelly 1-10 (1-0 pen, 0-8f, 1'65), K Moran 1-2, M Shanahan 0-3, R Foley, S Prendergast 0-2 each, J Mullane 0-1	Report	P McNamara 2-0, T O'Brien 0-3 (0-3f), N Quaid, A O'Connor (0-2f), B O'Sullivan 0-2 each, C Mullane 0-1	Fraher Field, Dungarvan; Referee: J. Ryan (Tipperary)

20 March 2010; 2:30 p.m.	Galway	1–22 – 1–18	Offaly	Pearse Stadium, Galway; Referee: J. McGrath (Westmeath)
20 March 2010; 2:30 p.m.	A Harte 1-3, G Farragher 0-6 (0-2f, 0-2sl), E Ryan 0-4, N Healy 0-3, D Burke, C Donnellan 0-2 each, K Hynes, R Cummins 0-1 each	Report	J Brady 1-1, S Dooley (0-3f), J Bergin, B Carroll 0-4 each, D Morkan 0-2, D Molloy, R Hanniffy, C Mahon 0-1 each	Pearse Stadium, Galway; Referee: J. McGrath (Westmeath)

21 March 2010; 2:30 p.m.	Dublin	0–23 – 2–21	Kilkenny	Parnell Park, Donnycarney; Referee: D. Kirwan (Cork)
21 March 2010; 2:30 p.m.	A McCrabbe 0-8 (0-7f), J McCaffrey 0-5 (2'65, 0-3f), M O'Brien 0-4, D O'Callaghan 0-2, D Treacy, S Durkin, J Boland, S Lambert 0-1 each	Report	R Power 2-7 (0-5f), J Mulhall 0-5, A Fogarty, P Hogan (2'65, 1 pen) 0-3 each, J Tennyson, T Walsh, D Lyng 0-1 each	Parnell Park, Donnycarney; Referee: D. Kirwan (Cork)

21 March 2010; 2:30 p.m.	Waterford	2–20 – 3–17	Cork	Walsh Park, Waterford; Referee: J. Ryan (Tipperary)
21 March 2010; 2:30 p.m.	E Kelly 1-17 (0-14f, 1'65), T Ryan 1-0, J Mullane 0-2, S Prendergast 0-1	Report	M Cussen 2-2, B O'Connor 0-8 (0-7f), P Horgan 1-2, C Naughton 0-3, T Kenny, J Gardiner 0-1 each	Walsh Park, Waterford; Referee: J. Ryan (Tipperary)

21 March 2010; 2:30 p.m.	Limerick	0–8 – 2–24	Tipperary	Gaelic Grounds, Limerick; Referee: M. Wadding (Waterford)
21 March 2010; 2:30 p.m.	P McNamara (0-2f), G Mulcahy 0-2 each, B O'Sullivan, P Browne, R McKeogh, A Owens 0-1 each	Report	T Hammersley 1-4 (0-1f), S Hennessy 0-6, J O'Brien 1-2, E Kelly 0-5 (0-3f, 1'65), G Ryan, M Webster, J Devane 0-2, M Heffernan 0-1	Gaelic Grounds, Limerick; Referee: M. Wadding (Waterford)

28 March 2010; 2:30 p.m.	Offaly	2–17 – 3–13	Limerick	O'Connor Park, Tullamore; Referee: M. Haverty (Galway)
28 March 2010; 2:30 p.m.	G Healion 2-1, S Dooley 0-10 (0-5f, 1'65), J Bergin 0-3(0-1 pen), D Currams 0-2, B Carroll 0-1	Report	T O'Brien 1-2, G Mulcahy, R McKeogh 1-0 each, P McNamara 0-5 (0-5f), B O'Sullivan 0-2, A Brennan, N Quaid, P Browne, P Russell 0-1 each	O'Connor Park, Tullamore; Referee: M. Haverty (Galway)

28 March 2010; 2:30 p.m.	Dublin	1–11 – 0–17	Cork	Parnell Park, Donnycarney; Referee: B. Gavin (Offaly)
28 March 2010; 2:30 p.m.	A McCrabbe 1-4 (0-4f), P Ryan, J McCaffrey (0-1f, 1'65) 0-2 each, D Treacy, K Flynn, S Durkin 0-1 each	Report	P Horgan 0-6, B O'Connor 0-4 (0-4f), C Naughton 0-2, T Kenny, A Ó hAilpín, P O'Sullivan, M O'Sullivan, L O'Farrell 0-1 each	Parnell Park, Donnycarney; Referee: B. Gavin (Offaly)

28 March 2010; 2:30 p.m.	Kilkenny	1–23 – 2–21	Galway	Nowlan Park, Kilkenny; Attendance: 7,124; Referee: J. Owens (Wexford)
28 March 2010; 2:30 p.m.	R Power 0-7 (5f), TJ Reid 1-3, A Comerford, A Fogarty 0-3 each, P Hogan (1f, 1'65), M Rice (1'65) 0-2 each, J Fitzpatrick, J Tennyson, J Mulhall 0-1 each	Report	G Farragher 0-9 (6f, 1'65), I Tannian 2-1, C Donnellan 0-4, A Harte 0-3, K Hynes 0-2, N Healy, D Burke 0-1 each	Nowlan Park, Kilkenny; Attendance: 7,124; Referee: J. Owens (Wexford)

28 March 2010; 2:30 p.m.	Tipperary	1–19 – 2–16	Waterford	Semple Stadium, Thurles; Referee: C. McAllister (Cork)
28 March 2010; 2:30 p.m.	T Hammersley 0-6 (4f, 1'65), L Corbett 0-4, N McGrath 1-1, B Maher, G Ryan, P Kelly 0-2 each, J O'Brien, S Hennessy 0-1 each	Report	E Kelly 1-7 (1-7f), S Molumphy 1-1, S O'Sullivan 0-3, D Shanahan 0-2, J Nagle, S Prendergast, J Mullane 0-1 each	Semple Stadium, Thurles; Referee: C. McAllister (Cork)

4 April 2010; 2:30 p.m.	Galway	0–17 – 0–15	Dublin	Pearse Stadium, Galway; Referee: B. Kelly (Westmeath)
4 April 2010; 2:30 p.m.	G Farragher 0-9 (7f, 2 '65); K Hynes, J Canning (1 sl) 0-2 each; O Canning, C Donnellan, E Ryan, D Hayes 0-1 each	Report	A McCrabbe 0-5 (5f); S Durkin 0-3; P Ryan (1f), J McCaffrey 0-2 each; P Kelly, D O'Callaghan and D Treacy 0-1 each	Pearse Stadium, Galway; Referee: B. Kelly (Westmeath)

4 April 2010; 2:30 p.m.	Limerick	0–16 – 2–17	Kilkenny	Gaelic Grounds, Limerick; Referee: A. Kelly (Galway)
4 April 2010; 2:30 p.m.	P McNamara 0-11 (7f, 2 '65s); R McKeogh 0-2; B O'Sullivan, S Herlihy, G Mulcahy 0-1 each	Report	TJ Reid 0-9 (7f, 1sl); E Larkin 1-1; A Fogarty 1-1; J Mulhall 0-3; M Comerford 0-2; D Lyng 0-1	Gaelic Grounds, Limerick; Referee: A. Kelly (Galway)

4 April 2010; 2:30 p.m.	Waterford	1–19 – 1–16	Offaly	Fraher Field, Dungarvan; Referee: J. Sexton (Cork)
4 April 2010; 2:30 p.m.	E Kelly 0-8 (0-8f), M Shanahan 0-6 (0-4f), D Shanahan 1-0, S Prendergast 0-2, S O'Sullivan, J Mullane, S Walsh 0-1 each	Report	S Dooley 1-10 (0-9f), D Molloy, D Currams 0-2 each, R Hanniffy, B Carroll 0-1 each	Fraher Field, Dungarvan; Referee: J. Sexton (Cork)

4 April 2010; 2:30 p.m.	Cork	1–16 – 1–15	Tipperary	Páirc Uí Chaoimh, Cork; Referee: J. McGrath (Westmeath)
4 April 2010; 2:30 p.m.	P Horgan 1-7 (6f), C Naughton 0-3, T Kenny, J O'Connor 0-2 each, L McLoughlin, J Gardiner (f) 0-1 each	Report	E Kelly 0-6 (5f), P Kelly 1-2, N McGrath 0-3, G Ryan 0-2, S McGrath, D Egan 0-1 each	Páirc Uí Chaoimh, Cork; Referee: J. McGrath (Westmeath)

18 April 2010; 2:30 p.m.	Kilkenny	1–20 – 2–12	Waterford	Nowlan Park, Kilkenny; Attendance: 6,237; Referee: A. Stapleton (Laois)
18 April 2010; 2:30 p.m.	M Grace (1-2), TJ Reid 0-5, R Hogan 0-5 (4 f, 1 '65), E Guinan 0-5 (1f), E Larkin, J Fitzpatrick, P Hogan 0-1 each	Report	E Kelly 1-5 (1 p, 5 f), K Moran 1-1, J Mullane 0-4, K McGrath, S Molumphy 0-1 each	Nowlan Park, Kilkenny; Attendance: 6,237; Referee: A. Stapleton (Laois)

18 April 2010; 2:30 p.m.	Galway	3–17 – 2–13	Cork	Pearse Stadium, Galway; Referee: D. Richardson (Limerick)
18 April 2010; 2:30 p.m.	N Healy 2-9 (5f, 0-1 p), D Hayes 1-1, N Hayes, F Coone 0-2 each, A Callanan, N Cahalan, C Dervan (f) 0-1 each.	Report	B O’Connor 0-5 (0-4 f), K Murphy 1-1, L O’Farrell 1-0, M Cussen, W Egan 0-2, G Callinan, F O’Leary, C McCarthy 0-1 each	Pearse Stadium, Galway; Referee: D. Richardson (Limerick)

18 April 2010; 2:30 p.m.	Offaly	2–14 – 1–18	Tipperary	O'Connor Park, Tullamore; Referee: B. Kelly (Westmeath)
18 April 2010; 2:30 p.m.	S Dooley 2-6 (0-3f, 0-1 ‘65), D Currams, J Bergin 0-2 each, R Hanniffy, S Kelly, C Parlon, B Carroll 0-1 each.	Report	E Kelly 0-7 (0-2f, 0-1 pen, 0-1 ‘65), S Callanan 1-2 (1-2f), S McGrath, S Hennessy 0-2 each, Padraic Maher, J Brennan, D Egan, M Heffernan, P Kerwick 0-1 each.	O'Connor Park, Tullamore; Referee: B. Kelly (Westmeath)

18 April 2010; 2:30 p.m.	Dublin	6–30 – 2–11	Limerick	Parnell Park, Donnycarney; Referee: M. Wadding (Waterford)
18 April 2010; 2:30 p.m.	A McCrabbe 0-10 (8f), D O’Callaghan 2-3, L Rushe 1-5, P Ryan 1-2 (0-1 f), J Kelly 1-1, S Lambert 0-4, S Ryan 1-0, P Kelly 0-3, J Boland, J McCaffrey 0-1 each	Report	P McNamara 1-7 (1-4 f), G Mulcahy 1-1, R McKeogh 0-2, J O’Brien 0-1	Parnell Park, Donnycarney; Referee: M. Wadding (Waterford)

=== Knock-out stage ===
Final

2 May 2010; 7:00 p.m.	Galway	2–22 – 1–17	Cork	Semple Stadium, Thurles; Attendance: 14,200; Referee: J. Owens (Wexford)
2 May 2010; 7:00 p.m.	J Canning 1-5; G Farragher 0-6 (4f, 1 '65), D Hayes 1-1, A Harte 0-3, A Smith 0-2, J Gantley 0-2, I Tannian, D Burke, C Donnellan 0-1 each	Report	C Naughton 1-1, B O’Connor 0-4 (0-2 sideline), J Gardiner 0-3 (1 '65), P Horgan 0-3 (0-1 pen), K Murphy, M Cussen 0-2 each, R Curran, J O’Connor 0-1 each	Semple Stadium, Thurles; Attendance: 14,200; Referee: J. Owens (Wexford)

=== Scoring statistics ===
Top scorers overall

Rank	Player	County	Tally	Total	Matches	Average
1	Shane Dooley	Offaly	6-57	75	7	10.71
2	Eoin Kelly	Waterford	4-47	59	5	11.80
3	Alan McCrabbe	Dublin	1-47	50	7	7.14
4	Ger Farragher	Galway	0-44	44	7	6.28
5	Patrick Horgan	Cork	2-37	43	7	6.14
6	Eoin Kelly	Tipperary	2-35	41	6	6.83
7	Paudie McNamara	Limerick	3-27	36	7	5.14
8	Richie Power	Kilkenny	2-29	35	4	8.75
9	Niall Healy	Galway	3-15	24	6	4.00
9	Maurice Shanahan	Waterford	0-24	24	6	4.00

Top scorers in a single game

Rank	Player	County	Tally	Total	Opposition
1	Eoin Kelly	Waterford	1-17	20	Cork
2	Shane Dooley	Offaly	2-10	16	Dublin
3	Niall Healy	Galway	2-09	15	Cork
4	Richie Power	Kilkenny	2-07	13	Dublin
4	Shane Dooley	Offaly	1-10	13	Waterford
4	Eoin Kelly	Waterford	1-10	13	Limerick
7	Shane Dooley	Offaly	2-06	12	Tipperary
8	Shane Dooley	Offaly	1-08	11	Cork
8	Paudie McNamara	Limerick	0-11	11	Kilkenny
10	Eoin Kelly	Tipperary	1-07	10	Kilkenny
10	Patrick Horgan	Cork	1-07	10	Tipperary
10	Eoin Kelly	Waterford	1-07	10	Tipperary
10	Paudie McNamara	Limerick	1-07	10	Dublin
10	Alan McCrabbe	Dublin	0-10	10	Tipperary
10	Shane Dooley	Offaly	0-10	10	Limerick
10	Alan McCrabbe	Dublin	0-10	10	Limerick

== Division 2 ==
National Hurling League Division 2
- Season: 2010
- Champions: Wexford; Captain: Diarmuid Lyng; Manager: Colm Bonnar
- Relegated: Kildare
- Matches: 29
- Top goalscorer: Diarmuid Lyng (1-58)
- Biggest home win: Clare 2-20 - 0-6 Down (21 February 2010)
- Biggest away win: Kildare 4-10 - 0-11 Westmeath (13 March 2010)
- Highest scoring: Clare 4-19 - 3-15 Westmeath (3 April 2010)
- All statistics correct as of 11 April 2017.

Clare and Kildare entered Division 2 as the respective relegated and promoted teams from the 2009 season.

On 2 May 2010, Wexford won the title following a 1–16 to 2–9 win over Clare in the final.

Kildare were relegated from Division 2 after losing all but one of their group stage matches. They spent just one season in Division 2.

Wexford's Diarmuid Lyng was the Division 2 top scorer with 1-58.

=== Table ===
Division 2 Final Relegated team

Pos	Team	Pld	W	D	L	Pts
1	Clare	7	6	1	0	13
2	Wexford (C, P)	7	5	1	1	11
3	Laois	7	5	0	2	10
4	Carlow	7	4	0	3	8
5	Antrim	7	2	0	5	4
6	Down	7	2	0	5	4
7	Westmeath	7	2	0	5	4
8	Kildare (R)	7	1	0	6	2

=== Group stage ===
21 February 2010; 1:30 p.m.	Clare	2–20 – 0–6	Down	Cusack Park, Ennis; Referee: M Haverty (Galway)
21 February 2010; 1:30 p.m.	M Flaherty 2-10; J Clancy 0-3; O Murphy and S Collins 0-2 each; P Donnellan (free), B O’Connell and D McMahon 0-1 each.	Report	P Braniff 0-4 (0-2 frees); J Coyle and C Woods (free) 0-1 each.	Cusack Park, Ennis; Referee: M Haverty (Galway)

21 February 2010; 2:30 p.m.	Laois	Postponed	Kildare	O'Moore Park, Portlaoise

21 February 2010; 2:30 p.m.	Westmeath	0–14 – 1–20	Wexford	Cusack Park, Mullingar; Referee: T Carroll (Offaly)
21 February 2010; 2:30 p.m.	B Murtagh (0-5, five frees), A Mitchell (0-5, three frees, one ‘65’), E Loughlin (0-2), P Dowdall (0-1); C Curley (0-1).		D Lyng (0-9, seven frees, one ‘65’), J Berry (1-0), D Stamp (0-1), C Kenny (0-1), PJ Nolan (0-3), D Nolan (0-1); R Jacob (0-1), S Banville (0-1), P Atkinson (0-1), M Travers (0-1), A Shore (0-1).	Cusack Park, Mullingar; Referee: T Carroll (Offaly)

21 February 2010; 2:30 p.m.	Antrim	1–11 – 2–7	Carlow	Casement Park, Belfast; Referee: E Hassan (Derry)
21 February 2010; 2:30 p.m.	L Watson (0-4, three frees); M Scullion (1-0), N McManus 0-3, two frees); S McNaughton (0-2), S McCrory (0-2).		P Kehoe (1-3, three frees), C Doyle (1-0), A Gaule (0-2), M Brennan (0-1); S Kavanagh (0-1, free).	Casement Park, Belfast; Referee: E Hassan (Derry)

28 February 2010; 1:30 p.m.	Wexford	2–23 – 1–12	Down	Wexford Park, Wexford; Referee: J O'Mahoney (Limerick)
28 February 2010; 1:30 p.m.	D Lyng 0-11 (0-5f, 0-1 '65), J Berry 1-4, T Waters 1-2, R Jacob, P Atkinson 0-2 each, PJ Nolan, A Shore 0-1 each.	Report	G Johnson 1-1 (1-1f), S Wilson 0-5 (0-3f, 0-1 '65), B Ennis, P Keith 0-2 each, E Clarke (0-1f), J McCuskar 0-1 each.	Wexford Park, Wexford; Referee: J O'Mahoney (Limerick)

28 February 2010; 2:30 p.m.	Kildare	2–7 – 1–19	Antrim	St Conleth's Park, Newbridge; Referee: S Whelan (Wexford)
28 February 2010; 2:30 p.m.	M Fitzgerald 1-2, R Hoban 1-0 (1-0 pen), L Harney 0-3(0-3f), T Murphy 0-2.	Report	N McManus 1-7 (0-6fs), L Watson 0-7 (0-3fs), S McNaughton 0-3, E McCloskey, PJ O'Connell 0-1 each.	St Conleth's Park, Newbridge; Referee: S Whelan (Wexford)

28 February 2010; 2:30 p.m.	Laois	1–11 – 2–12	Clare	O'Moore Park, Portlaoise; Referee: D Richardson (Limerick)
28 February 2010; 2:30 p.m.	W Hyland (1-4); B Campion (0-3), J Rowney (0-1), E Costelloe (0-1), J Brophy (0-1), S Dollard (0-1).		C Ryan (1-3), A Markham (1-0), N O'Connell (0-2); J Conlon (0-2), P Donnellan (0-1); J Clancy (0-1), S Collins (0-1), F Lynch (0-1); M Flaherty (0-1).	O'Moore Park, Portlaoise; Referee: D Richardson (Limerick)

28 February 2010; 2:30 p.m.	Carlow	5–17 – 1–10	Westmeath	Dr. Cullen Park, Carlow; Referee: T Ryan (Tipperary)
28 February 2010; 2:30 p.m.	P Kehoe 2-5 (1-0 pen, 0-4f), R Coady 0-6, (0-5f, 0-1 '65'), E Byrne 1-0, D Roberts, C Doyle 1-1 each, C Hughes, M Brennan, D English, A Gaule 0-1 each.	Report	B Murtagh 1-2 (1-1f), A Mitchell 0-4 (0-4f), D Carthy 0-2 (0-2f), A Dowdall, D McNicholas 0-1 each.	Dr. Cullen Park, Carlow; Referee: T Ryan (Tipperary)

9 March 2010	Laois	1–15 – 0–8	Kildare	O'Moore Park, Portlaoise; Referee: D O'Driscoll (Limerick)
9 March 2010	W Hyland (0-6); T Fitzgerald (1-1), E Costelloe (0-4), N Foyle (0-2), J Dunne (0-1), B Campion (0-1).	Report	B White (0-5, 0-4f), R Hoban (0-1, 0-1f), T Murphy (0-1), D Kennedy, D Harney (0-1).	O'Moore Park, Portlaoise; Referee: D O'Driscoll (Limerick)

13 March 2010; 2:30 p.m.	Westmeath	0–11 – 4–10	Kildare	Cusack Park, Mullingar; Referee: F Smyth (Meath)
13 March 2010; 2:30 p.m.	B Murtagh (0-4, 0-2 from frees), A Dowdall (0-2), A Mitchell (0-2, 0-1 from a '65', 0-1 from a free), D McNicholas (0-2), J Clarke (0-1).	Report	D Carter (2-1), D Harney (1-3), J Houlihan (1-1), B White (0-4, all from frees), M Fitzgerald (0-1).	Cusack Park, Mullingar; Referee: F Smyth (Meath)

14 March 2010; 2:30 p.m.	Clare	1–22 – 2–19	Wexford	Cusack Park, Ennis; Referee: D O’Driscoll (Limerick)
14 March 2010; 2:30 p.m.	D Honan 1-6; C Ryan 0-9 (7f); J Conlon 0-2; B O’Connell, N O’Connell (0-1f), J Clancy, P Vaughan, S Collins 0-1 each.	Report	D Lyng 1-9 (5f, 1 ’65); R Jacob 1-3; H Kehoe 0-3; T Waters, S Banville, A Shore, C Farrell 0-1 each.	Cusack Park, Ennis; Referee: D O’Driscoll (Limerick)

14 March 2010; 2:30 p.m.	Down	3–9 – 3–11	Carlow	Mitchell Park, Ballygalget; Referee: O Elliott (Antrim)
14 March 2010; 2:30 p.m.	S Wilson (1-5, 1-5f), G Johnson (1-1, 1-0f), C O'Prey (1-0), A Savage (0-1), C Coulter (0-1); E Clarke (0-1, 1f).		P Kehoe (2-7, 1-7f), A Gaule (1-0), D Roberts (0-1), C Doyle (0-1), R Foley (0-1), S Kavanagh (0-1).	Mitchell Park, Ballygalget; Referee: O Elliott (Antrim)

14 March 2010; 2:30 p.m.	Antrim	1–12 – 2–19	Laois	Casement Park, Belfast; Referee: G Devlin (Armagh)
14 March 2010; 2:30 p.m.	N McManus (1-5, 0-3 frees), S McNaughton (0-3); L Watson (0-2, 0-1 free), P Shiels (0-2, 0-1 free).	Report	W Hyland (0-12, 0-6 frees, 0-1 a '65'); N Foyle (2-0), E Costello (0-2), T Fitzgerald (0-2), J Walsh (0-1), O Holohan (0-1), J Purcell (0-1).	Casement Park, Belfast; Referee: G Devlin (Armagh)

20 March 2010; 2:30 p.m.	Kildare	1–15 – 2–16	Down	St Conleth's Park, Newbridge; Referee: G Duffy (Antrim)
20 March 2010; 2:30 p.m.	D Harney (1-3), D Kennedy (0-4, 2f), T Murphy (0-3), B White (0-2, 2f), N Ó Muineacháin (0-1), D Carter (0-1), C Bonus (0-1).		P Braniff (1-9, 5f), C O'Prey (1-0), S Wilson (0-3, 3f), G Johnson (0-2), B Ennis (0-2).	St Conleth's Park, Newbridge; Referee: G Duffy (Antrim)

21 March 2010; 2:30 p.m.	Antrim	1–9 – 0–13	Clare	Casement Park, Belfast; Referee: B Kelly (Westmeath)
21 March 2010; 2:30 p.m.	N McManus 1-3 (1-0 pen), P Shiels 0-3, S McNaughton, C McFall, A Smylie 0-1 each.	Report	C Ryan 0-5 (0-5f), B Nugent 0-3, D McMahon, F Lynch 0-2 each, S Collins 0-1.	Casement Park, Belfast; Referee: B Kelly (Westmeath)

21 March 2010; 2:30 p.m.	Carlow	0–16 – 0–13	Wexford	Dr. Cullen Park, Carlow; Referee: A Stapleton (Laois)
21 March 2010; 2:30 p.m.	D Murphy (0-3, all frees), P Kehoe (0-3, two frees), S Kavanagh (0-3, all frees), A Gaule (0-2), C Doyle (0-2), R Coady (0-1); E Nolan (0-1); M Brennan (0-1).		D Lyng (0-9, three frees, one '65'), P Atkinson (0-3), W Doran (0-1).	Dr. Cullen Park, Carlow; Referee: A Stapleton (Laois)

21 March 2010; 2:30 p.m.	Laois	4–14 – 0–13	Westmeath	O'Moore Park, Portlaoise; Referee: J O'Mahoney (Limerick)
21 March 2010; 2:30 p.m.	W Hyland (1-4, 3f); O Holohan (1-1), T Fitzgerald (1-1), N Foyle (1-1), M Whelan (0-2, 1f, 1 '65), J Walsh (0-2), B Stapleton (0-1); M McEvoy (0-1); E Costello (0-1), S Dollard (0-1).		B Murtagh (0-7, 6f), D Carthy (0-3), A Dowdall (0-1), A Mitchell (0-1, 1f), J Shaw (0-1).	O'Moore Park, Portlaoise; Referee: J O'Mahoney (Limerick)

28 March 2010; 2:30 p.m.	Wexford	0–24 – 0–12	Kildare	Wexford Park, Wexford; Referee: J Sexton (Cork)
28 March 2010; 2:30 p.m.	A Shore (0-4); R Jacob (0-4), D Lyng (0-4, two frees), P Atkinson (0-3), H Kehoe (0-3), C Farrell (0-3); D Stamp (0-1), E Quigley (0-1), M Travers (0-1).		B White (0-7 frees), D Harney (0-2, one free), T Murphy (0-1), M Moloney (0-1), M Fitzgerald (0-1).	Wexford Park, Wexford; Referee: J Sexton (Cork)

28 March 2010; 2:30 p.m.	Westmeath	1–14 – 1–13	Antrim	Cusack Park, Mullingar; Referee: E Hassan (Derry)
28 March 2010; 2:30 p.m.	B Murtagh (0-5, four frees, 1 65), D McNicholas (0-4), C Curley (1-0), A Dowdall (0-2), J Clarke (0-1); D Carty (0-1), E Price (0-1).		S McNaughton (1-6, 0-4 from frees), K McKeegan (0-3, two frees, 1 65); P Shiels (0-3, two frees), PJ O'Connell (0-1).	Cusack Park, Mullingar; Referee: E Hassan (Derry)

28 March 2010; 2:30 p.m.	Carlow	0–11 – 1–9	Clare	Dr. Cullen Park, Carlow; Referee: S Whelan (Wexford)
28 March 2010; 2:30 p.m.	S Kavanagh (0-5, four frees, one 65), P Kehoe (0-2, both frees), C Doyle (0-1); A Gaule (0-1), D Roberts (0-1), D Murphy (0-1, free).		C Ryan (1-3, all frees), J Clancy (0-2), J Conlon (0-2), C O'Donovan (0-1); S Collins (0-1).	Dr. Cullen Park, Carlow; Referee: S Whelan (Wexford)

28 March 2010; 2:30 p.m.	Down	1–11 – 0–20	Laois	St. Patrick's Park, Portaferry; Referee: T Carroll (Offaly)
28 March 2010; 2:30 p.m.	G Johnston (1-2, 0-1f), B Ennis (0-3); J Coyle (0-3, 0-1f), C Woods (0-2, 0-1 sl), A Savage (0-1).	Report	W Hyland (0-9, 0-6f, 0-1 sl), M Whelan (0-3, 0-3f), N Foyle (0-2), E Costelloe (0-2), M McEvoy (0-2), James Walsh (0-1), J Fitzpatrick (0-1).	St. Patrick's Park, Portaferry; Referee: T Carroll (Offaly)

3 April 2010; 2:30 p.m.	Clare	4–19 – 3–15	Westmeath	Cusack Park, Ennis; Referee: T Ryan (Tipperary)
3 April 2010; 2:30 p.m.	C Ryan 1-9; Clancy 1-3; C O’Donovan, M Murphy 1-0 each; J Conlon 0-3; D McMahon 0-2; P Donnellan, D Barrett 0-1 each.	Report	A Mitchell 2-5; B Murtagh 0-5; P Greville 1-0; D Carthy 0-3; D McNicholas, P Dowdall 0-1 each.	Cusack Park, Ennis; Referee: T Ryan (Tipperary)

4 April 2010; 2:30 p.m.	Antrim	2–16 – 2–17	Down	Casement Park, Belfast; Referee: T Carroll (Offaly)
4 April 2010; 2:30 p.m.	P Shiels (0-9), N McManus (2-0), PJ O'Connell (0-3); N McAuley (0-1), K McKeegan (0-1), C McAllister (0-1), K Stewart (0-1).		J Coyle (1-6), S Clarke (1-0), G Johnston (0-3), C Woods (0-3), K McGarry (0-2); A Savage (0-2), R McGrattan (0-1).	Casement Park, Belfast; Referee: T Carroll (Offaly)

4 April 2010; 2:30 p.m.	Laois	1–14 – 1–18	Wexford	O'Moore Park, Portlaoise; Referee: G Duffy (Antrim)
4 April 2010; 2:30 p.m.	Z Keenan (1-2), W Hyland (0-5); J Fitzpatrick (0-3), E Costelloe (0-2), T Fitzgerald (0-1), E Reilly (0-1).		P Atkinson (1-1), S Banville (0-4), D Lyng (0-4); C Farrell (0-4); R Jacob (0-3), A Shore (0-1), E Quigley (0-1).	O'Moore Park, Portlaoise; Referee: G Duffy (Antrim)

4 April 2010; 2:30 p.m.	Kildare	2–5 – 3–14	Carlow	St Conleth's Park, Newbridge; Referee: O Elliot (Antrim)
4 April 2010; 2:30 p.m.	M Fitzgerald (1-1), D Kennedy (1-0), M Moloney (0-3), T Murphy (0-1).		P Kehoe (1-4), C Doyle (1-1); R Foley (1-1), E Nolan (0-3), A Gaule (0-2), S Kavanagh (0-1), M Brennan (0-1), D Murphy (0-1).	St Conleth's Park, Newbridge; Referee: O Elliot (Antrim)

18 April 2010; 2:30 p.m.	Wexford	4–18 – 1–12	Antrim	Wexford Park, Wexford; Referee: S Roche (Tipperary)
18 April 2010; 2:30 p.m.	P Atkinson (2-4), R Jacob (2-3), D Lyng (0-5, 3f); S Banville (0-2), L Prendergast (0-1), C Kenny (0-1), C Farrell (0-1); E Quigley (0-1),	Report	P Shiels (0-6, 34), N McManus (1-1 frees), C McAlister (0-2), E McCloskey (0-1); PJ O'Connell (0-1), M Devlin (0-1).	Wexford Park, Wexford; Referee: S Roche (Tipperary)

18 April 2010; 2:30 p.m.	Kildare	0–11 – 2–15	Clare	St Conleth's Park, Newbridge
18 April 2010; 2:30 p.m.	M Fitzgerald (0-4); D Kennedy (0-3), M Moloney (0-2), D Harney (0-2).		C Ryan (1-4), D McMahon (1-0), N O'Connell (0-3), C O'Donovan (0-2), B Nugent (0-2), J Conlon (0-2), F Lynch (0-1); P Vaughan (0-1),	St Conleth's Park, Newbridge

18 April 2010; 2:30 p.m.	Down	1–18 – 3–14	Westmeath	McKenna Park, Ballycran; Referee: R Matthews (Antrim)
18 April 2010; 2:30 p.m.	J Coyle (0-7), C O'Prey (1-0), S Wilson (0-3), P Braniff (0-3), P Keith (0-2), C Woods (0-2), A Savage (0-1).		D McNicholas (2-2), B Murtagh (0-8), E Price (1-1), A Mitchell (0-2), C Curley (0-1).	McKenna Park, Ballycran; Referee: R Matthews (Antrim)

18 April 2010; 2:30 p.m.	Carlow	1–10 – 1–16	Laois	Dr. Cullen Park, Carlow; Referee: T Carroll (Offaly)
18 April 2010; 2:30 p.m.	C Doyle 1-1, P Kehoe (0-1f, 0-1 '65), A Gaule (0-1f) 0-2 each, D Murphy, R Foley, D English (0-1f), R Dunbar (0-1f), B Lawler 0-1 each.	Report	Z Keenan 1-4, W Hyland 0-3 (0-1f), M Whelan (0-2f), J Purcell 0-2 each, C Healy, E Costelloe, N Foyle, S Dollard, J Dunne 0-1 each.	Dr. Cullen Park, Carlow; Referee: T Carroll (Offaly)

=== Knock-out stage ===
Final

2 May 2010; 5:00 p.m. Final	Clare	2–9 – 1–16	Wexford	Semple Stadium, Thurles; Referee: J Ryan (Tipperary)
2 May 2010; 5:00 p.m. Final	C Ryan 1-3 (0-3f), J Conlon 1-2, D McMahon 0-2, D Honan, J Clancy 0-1.	Report	D Lyng 0-7 (0-3f, 0-1s), R Jacob 1-2, C Farrell 0-3, P Atkinson, S Banville, E Quigley, PJ Nolan 0-1.	Semple Stadium, Thurles; Referee: J Ryan (Tipperary)

=== Scoring statistics ===
Top scorers overall

Rank	Player	County	Tally	Total	Matches	Average
1	Diarmuid Lyng	Wexford	1-58	61	8	7.62
2	Colin Ryan	Clare	5-36	51	8	6.37
3	Willie Hyland	Laois	2-43	49	7	7.00
4	Paudie Kehoe	Carlow	6-26	44	7	6.28
5	Brendan Murtagh	Westmeath	1-36	39	7	5.57
6	Neil McManus	Antrim	6-19	37	6	6.16
7	Rory Jacob	Wexford	4-18	30	7	4.28
8	Andrew Mitchell	Westmeath	2-19	25	7	3.57
9	Peter Atkinson	Wexford	3-15	24	8	3.00
10	Paul Shiels	Antrim	0-23	23	5	4.60

Top scorers in a single game

Rank	Player	County	Tally	Total	Opposition
1	Mark Flaherty	Clare	2-10	16	Down
2	Paudie Kehoe	Carlow	2-07	13	Down
3	Diarmuid Lyng	Wexford	1-09	12	Clare
3	Colin Ryan	Clare	1-09	12	Westmeath
3	Paul Braniff	Down	1-09	12	Kildare
3	Willie Hyland	Laois	0-12	12	Antrim
7	Andrew Mitchell	Westmeath	2-05	11	Clare
7	Paudie Kehoe	Carlow	2-05	11	Westmeath
7	Diarmuid Lyng	Wexford	0-11	11	Down
10	Peter Atkinson	Wexford	2-04	10	Antrim
10	Neil McManus	Antrim	1-07	10	Kildare

== Division 3A ==
National Hurling League Division 3A
- Season: 2010
- Champions: Kerry; Captain: Colin Harris; Manager: John Meyler
- Relegated: Mayo
- Matches: 16
- Top goalscorer: Martin Finn (2-27)
- Biggest home win: Kerry 3-30 - 3-10 Meath (14 March 2010)
- Biggest away win: Derry 5-16 - 0-8 London (28 February 2010)
- Highest scoring: Kerry 3-30 - 3-10 Meath (14 March 2010)
- All statistics correct as of 1 May 2017.

Kerry and London entered Division 3A as the respective relegated and promoted teams from the 2010 season.

On 10 April 2010, Kerry won the title following a 2–18 to 1–15 win over Derry in the final.

Mayo were relegated from Division 3A after losing all but one of their group stage matches.

London's Martin Finn was the Division 3A top scorer with 2-27.

=== Table ===
Division 3A Final Relegated team

Pos	Team	Pld	W	D	L	Pts
1	Kerry (C, P)	5	5	0	0	10
2	Derry	5	3	0	2	6
3	Meath	5	2	1	2	5
4	London	5	2	0	3	4
5	Armagh	5	1	1	3	3
6	Mayo (R)	5	1	0	4	2

=== Group stage ===
21 February 2010	Derry	1-9 - 3-13	Kerry	Celtic Park, Derry; Referee: G Devlin (Armagh)
21 February 2010	P Henry (0-5, 4f); O McCloskey (1-0, 1 pen), R Convery (0-3, 1f), A Grant (0-1).		D O'Connell (2-3, 1f), JM Dooley (1-1), J Griffin (0-2); J Flaherty (0-2), S Brick (0-2, 1f); T Murnane (0-1); G O'Brien (0-1), M Boyle (0-1).	Celtic Park, Derry; Referee: G Devlin (Armagh)

21 February 2010	London	1-14 - 2-16	Meath	Emerald GAA Grounds, Ruislip; Referee: A Kelly (Galway)
21 February 2010	J Holohan (1-2), M Finn (0-5, 5f), P Stephenson (0-4); C Quinn (0-2, 1f), J McCormack (0-1).		N Hackett (1-4, 0-3 f, 0-1 pen), P Durnin (0-6), N Horan (1-1), J Keena (0-3), P Garvey (0-1, 1f); D Kirby (0-1);	Emerald GAA Grounds, Ruislip; Referee: A Kelly (Galway)

28 February 2010	London	0-8 - 5-16	Derry	Cassiobury Park, Watford; Referee: D Copps (Cork)
28 February 2010	C Quinn (0-6, 5f), J McCormack (0-1), D Kinsella (0-1).		P McCloskey (4-1), P Henry (0-10, 8f, 1 '65); M Craig (1-0), K Hinphey (0-1); S McNicholl (0-1), R McCloskey (0-1); M Conway (0-1), O McCloskey (0-1).	Cassiobury Park, Watford; Referee: D Copps (Cork)

28 February 2010	Mayo	2-14 - 1-18	Kerry	MacHale Park, Castlebar; Referee: P Greene (Galway)
28 February 2010	R Cullinane (1-3, 2f), B Moran (0-4, 4f), K Robinson (1-0), D McDonnell (0-3, 2f), K Higgins (0-2), S Hoban (0-1); D McConn (0-1).		S Brick (0-12. 7f); JM Dooley (1-0), M Conway (0-2), S Nolan (0-2), M Boyle (0-1), T Murnane (0-1);	MacHale Park, Castlebar; Referee: P Greene (Galway)

28 February 2010	Meath	1-20 - 2-17	Armagh	Páirc Tailteann, Navan
28 February 2010	N Hackett (0-7, 6 fs), S Clynch (0-6, 1 f, 1 65), P Durnin (1-2), J Boyle (0-2); N Horan (0-2), J Keena (0-1).		G Enright (1-3, 0-1 f), K McKernan (1-1), F Bradley (0-4), C Carvill (0-4); P Breen (0-2, fs), B McCann (0-2), J Corvan (0-1).	Páirc Tailteann, Navan

9 March 2010	Armagh	0-17 - 0-19	Mayo	St. Oliver Plunkett Park, Crossmaglen
9 March 2010	P Breen (0-4, 2f), P McCormack (0-3), F Bradley (0-2), R Gaffney (0-2), J Corvan (0-2), G Enright (0-2); K McKernan (0-2).		B Moran (0-10, all frees); D McConn (0-4), E Madigan (0-2), K Higgins (0-1), S Hoban (0-1), K Robinson (0-1).	St. Oliver Plunkett Park, Crossmaglen

14 March 2010	Armagh	1-15 - 4-7	London	St. Oliver Plunkett Park, Crossmaglen; Referee: R Matthews (Antrim)
14 March 2010	P Breen 0-6 (0-5f), C McCann, P McCormack 0-4 each, P McArdle 1-0, F Bradley 0-1.		T Toomey 2-0, M Finn 1-2 (1-0f), A Healy 1-0, R O'Connell 0-3, K Kennedy, C Quinn 0-1 each.	St. Oliver Plunkett Park, Crossmaglen; Referee: R Matthews (Antrim)

14 March 2010	Kerry	3-30 - 3-10	Meath	Austin Stack Park, Tralee; Referee: M O'Connor (Limerick)
14 March 2010	S Brick 0-15 (0-6f, 0-2 '65's), G O'Brien 2-1, M Boyle 0-6, M Conway 1-1, D O'Connell 0-4, JM Dooley, J Flaherty, C Harty 0-1 each.		N Hackett 1-2 (0-2f), S Clynch 0-4 ( 0-1f, 0-1 '65), P Durnin 1-1, J Keena 1-0, P Keogh, Garvey, N Horan 0-1 each.	Austin Stack Park, Tralee; Referee: M O'Connor (Limerick)

14 March 2010	Mayo	1-7 - 3-12	Derry	MacHale Park, Castlebar; Referee: P Greene (Galway)
14 March 2010	B Moran 0-4 (0-4f), N Murphy 1-1, K Higgins 0-2.		P Henry 2-1, O McCloskey 1-2, P Convery 0-4 ('65), K Hinphey, S McNicholl 0-2 each, M Craig 0-1.	MacHale Park, Castlebar; Referee: P Greene (Galway)

21 March 2010	Derry	1-12 - 3-11	Armagh	Celtic Park, Derry; Referee: D Magee (Down)
21 March 2010	P Henry (0-4, 4f), K Hinphey (0-4); F Kelly (1-0), R Convery (0-3, 2f, 1 '65), M Conway (0-1).		F Bradley (1-2), R Gaffney (0-4, 4f), C Carvill (1-0); C McCann (1-0), K McKernan (0-2), P McCormack (0-1, 1f), J Corvan (0-1); B McCormack (0-1).	Celtic Park, Derry; Referee: D Magee (Down)

21 March 2010	London	0-17 - 2-19	Kerry	Emerald GAA Grounds, Ruislip; Referee: T Ryan (Tipperary)
21 March 2010	M Finn (0-10, 7f, 1 '65), P Stephenson (0-3), C Quinn (0-2, 2f), R O'Connell (0-1); J McCormack (0-1).		JM Dooley (1-4, 4f), M Boyle (0-5), M Conway (1-1), C Harty (0-2), J Griffin (0-2), J Casey (0-1), P Maunson (0-1); J Egan (0-1), S Mansell (0-1), R Kenny (0-1).	Emerald GAA Grounds, Ruislip; Referee: T Ryan (Tipperary)

21 March 2010	Meath	2-18 - 1-12	Mayo	Páirc Tailteann, Navan; Referee: G Devlin (Armagh)
21 March 2010	N Horan (2-0), N Hackett (0-5, 4f, 1 '65), S Clynch (0-4), S Donoghue (0-3); K Keena (0-2), P Durnin (0-2), P Fagan (0-1), D Muldoon (0-1).		D Dowling (1-1), S Hunt (0-4, 2f), S Hoban (0-3, 3f), N Murphy (0-2); D McDonnell (0-1), K Feeney (0-1).	Páirc Tailteann, Navan; Referee: G Devlin (Armagh)

27 March 2010	Kerry	2-22 - 1-9	Armagh	Austin Stack Park, Tralee; Referee: D Copps (Cork)
27 March 2010	G O'Brien (2-0), M Conway (0-6, 2f, 2 '65), J Egan (0-5, 1f), C Harty (0-4); S Young (0-2), M Boyle (0-2), L Boyle (0-1, 1f), T Murnane (0-1); J Flaherty (0-1).		P McCormack (0-4, 2f), R Gaffney (1-0), M Kernan (0-2), B McNaughton (0-2), C Carvill (0-1);	Austin Stack Park, Tralee; Referee: D Copps (Cork)

27 March 2010	Mayo	0-15 - 3-14	London	MacHale Park, Castlebar
27 March 2010	K Higgins (0-6, 3f); S Hunt (0-6, 5f), N Murphy (0-1); D McConn (0-1), C Hynes (0-1).		M Finn (1-10, 7f), DK Walsh (1-2), M Mythen (1-0), N Forde (0-1), R O'Connell (0-1).	MacHale Park, Castlebar

27 March 2010	Meath	1-17 - 2-15	Derry	Páirc Tailteann, Navan; Referee: J O'Mahony (Limerick)
27 March 2010	N Hackett (0-5, 4f), N Kirby (1-1), S Donoghue (0-4), M Mullally (0-2), P Keogh (0-1); D Kirby (0-1), S Clynch (0-1, 1f), K Keena (0-1); P Garvey (0-1).		K Hinphey (2-2); R Convey (0-5, 3f 1 65), S McBride (0-3), P Henry (0-3, 2f), F Kelly (0-1), P McCloskey (0-1).	Páirc Tailteann, Navan; Referee: J O'Mahony (Limerick)

=== Knock-out stage ===
Final

10 April 2010; Final	Kerry	2–18 – 1–15	Derry	Woodmount, Ballinasloe; Referee: A Kelly (Galway)
10 April 2010; Final	D O'Connell 0–12 (9f, 1 '65); J Flaherty 1–1; J McCarthy 1–0; J Egan 0–2; T Murnane, M Conway and M Boyle 0–1 each	Report	R Convery 0–5 (4f, 1 '65); P McCloskey 1–2; M Craig 0–3; P Henry 0–2f; K Hinphey 0–2; O McCloskey 0–1	Woodmount, Ballinasloe; Referee: A Kelly (Galway)

=== Scoring statistics ===
Top scorers overall

Rank	Player	County	Tally	Total
1	Martin Finn	London	2-27	33
2	Paddy Henry	Derry	2-25	31
3	Neil Hackett	Meath	2-23	29
3	Shane Brick	Kerry	0-29	29
5	Darragh O'Connell	Kerry	2-19	25
6	Paddy McCloskey	Derry	5-04	19
6	Mike Conway	Kerry	2-13	19
8	Brian Moran	Mayo	0-18	18
9	Peter Durnin	Meath	2-11	17
9	Kevin Hinphey	Derry	2-11	17

Top scorers in a single game

Rank	Player	County	Tally	Total	Opposition
1	Shane Brick	Kerry	0-15	15	Meath
2	Paddy McCloskey	Derry	4-01	13	London
2	Martin Finn	London	1-10	13	Mayo
4	Shane Brick	Kerry	0-12	12	Mayo
4	Darragh O'Connell	Kerry	0-12	12	Derry
6	Martin Finn	London	0-10	10	Kerry
6	Paddy Henry	Derry	0-10	10	London
6	Brian Moran	Mayo	0-10	10	Armagh
9	Darragh O'Connell	Kerry	2-03	9	Derry
10	Kevin Hinphey	Derry	2-02	8	Meath

== Division 3B ==
National Hurling League Division 3B
- Season: 2010
- Champions: Wicklow
- Relegated: Tyrone
- All statistics correct as of 1 May 2017.

=== Table ===
Division 3B Final Relegated team

Pos	Team	Pld	W	D	L	Pts
1	Wicklow (C, P)	6	6	0	0	12
2	Louth	6	4	0	2	8
3	Roscommon	6	4	0	2	8
4	Fingal	6	3	0	3	6
5	Sligo	6	2	0	4	4
6	Donegal	6	2	0	4	4
7	Tyrone (R)	6	0	0	6	0

- Louth were placed ahead of Roscommon as they won the head-to-head match between the teams.
- Sligo were placed ahead of Donegal as they won the head-to-head match between the teams.

=== Knock-out stage ===
Final

1 May 2010	Wicklow	3–18 – 2–9	Louth	Parnell Park, Donnycarney; Referee: D Magee (Down)
1 May 2010	J O'Neill 0-13 (10f); A O'Brien 2-3; D Hyland 1-0; R Keddy, T Doyle 0-1 each	Report	S Callan 1-2; D Murphy 0-4 (4f); C Connolly 1-0; S Fennell, K McNally, W Morrissey 0-1 each	Parnell Park, Donnycarney; Referee: D Magee (Down)

== Division 4 ==
=== Table ===
Division champions and promoted team

Pos	Team	Pld	W	D	L	Pts
1	Monaghan (C, P)	5	5	0	0	10
2	Longford	5	4	0	1	8
3	Fermanagh	5	2	0	3	4
4	Cavan	5	2	0	3	4
5	Leitrim	5	1	0	4	2
6	South Down	5	1	0	4	2

- Fermanagh were placed ahead of Cavan as they won the head-to-head match between the teams.
- Leitrim were placed ahead of South Down as they won the head-to-head match between the teams.

=== Knock-out stage ===
Final

10 April 2010	Monaghan	1–18 – 1–10	Longford	Kingspan Breffni Park, Cavan; Referee: E. Hassan (Derry)
10 April 2010	M McHugh 0-10 (8f); T Hilliard 1-0; S Leonard, D Crowe 0-2 each; B McGuigan, B Phelan, M Lennon, K Boylan 0-1 each.	Report	G Ghee 0-5 (3f); J O'Brien 1-0; S Hannon, E Donnellan (1f) 0-2; M Cassidy 0-1	Kingspan Breffni Park, Cavan; Referee: E. Hassan (Derry)

Monaghan won promotion to Division 3B for 2011 while Longford remained in Division 4 for 2011
