= Éamonn Cregan =

Irish Gaelic footballer, hurler and manager

Personal information
- Native name: Éamonn Ó Críagáin (Irish)
- Nickname: Blondie
- Born: 21 May 1945 (age 81) Limerick, Ireland
- Occupation: Retired
- Height: 6 ft 0 in (183 cm)

Sport
- Football Position: Left wing-forward
- Hurling Position: Centre-back/Left corner-forward
Club
- Years: Club
- 1963–1988: Claughaun
Club titles
	Football	Hurling
Limerick titles	8	3
Inter-county
- Years: County
- 1965–1971 1965–1983: Limerick (F); Limerick (H)
Inter-county titles
	Football	Hurling
Munster Titles	0	4
All-Ireland Titles	0	1
League titles	0	1
All-Stars	0	3

Éamonn Cregan (born 21 May 1945) is an Irish former Gaelic footballer, hurler and manager. He is best remembered for his success with Limerick, as a player in the 1970s and then as manager of various club and inter-county teams in the 1980s and 1990s. Cregan was inducted into the GAA Hall of Fame in 2013.

== Playing career ==
=== Club ===
Cregan played his club hurling and football with his local club in Claughaun and enjoyed much success. He won his first senior county title with the club in 1968 and added a second three years later in 1971. Cregan won a third and final county medal in 1986. This was Cregan's last appearance in a county championship final. He also won 8 Limerick Senior Football Championship titles.

=== Inter-county ===
Cregan first came to prominence on the inter-county scene as a dual player with the Limerick minor hurling and football teams in the early 1960s. In 1963, he was appointed captain of the Limerick hurling team. That year Cregan's side defeated Tipperary by 4–12 to 5–4 to win a Munster MHC title. He later led his team out in the All-Ireland MHC final; however lost to Wexford by a scoreline of 4–10 to 2–7. Cregan also played with the Limerick minor football team, as well as later lining out with the county's under-21 teams. He had little success in these grades.

Cregan made his debut with the Limerick senior hurling team in 1964 and he impressed immediately. He later gave up playing football with the county in an effort to concentrate on his hurling. Limerick hurling was in the doldrums at the time as the county hadn't won a Munster Senior Hurling Championship (SHC) title since 1955.

In 1970, Limerick's hurling fortunes started to change. That year Cregan's side reached the 'home' final of the National Hurling League with Cork providing the opposition. Limerick were trounced on that occasion by 2–17 to 0–7. This was the first of five consecutive league final appearances for Limerick and for Cregan.

In 1971, Limerick were back in the league final. On this occasion Tipperary provided the opposition and an exciting game ensued. Limerick just about won the game by 3–12 to 3–11, giving Cregan a National League medal. His side reached the next three league finals; however, Limerick lost on all three occasions. Cregan was personally honoured in 1971 when he was named in the inaugural All-Stars team. He won a second consecutive All-Star in 1972.

Two years later, in 1973, Limerick returned to the Munster SHC final. The opponent was Tipperary, and the game proved to be an exciting and controversial affair. Tipp were the favourites going into the game and they asserted their dominance early on. In spite of this, Limerick scored three goals in the first twenty-four minutes and trailed by 2–9 to 3–2 at half-time. Tipp ploughed on in the second-half; however, Cregan scored two decisive goals to put Limerick in the lead. As the game entered the dying minutes both sides were level. A Limerick shot appeared to have gone wide before it struck a Tipperary defender. In spite of this a 70-yard free was awarded. Richie Bennis scored the winning point, in spite of some reports that it trailed wide as it went over the bar. With that Limerick claimed the victory and Cregan won his first Munster SHC medal. Limerick were far from impressive when they defeated London in the next game, setting up a meeting with the reigning champion Kilkenny in the 1973 All-Ireland SHC final. Cregan was switched from his usual forward position to centre-back where he marked Kilkenny's scorer in chief Pat Delaney. Kilkenny were severely hampered by the absence of some of their greatest players. Limerick went on to win that game by 1–21 to 1–14. It was Cregan's first All-Ireland Senior Hurling Championship (SHC) medal and Limerick's first since 1940.

In 1974, Limerick maintained provincial dominance. Cregan captured a second Munster SHC medal following a 6–14 to 3–9 trouncing of Clare. This victory allowed Cregan's side to advance directly to the 1974 All-Ireland SHC final, with Kilkenny providing the opposition again. 'The Cats' were back to full strength and set out for revenge. In spite of this Limerick stormed into an early lead; however, this was diminished as Pat Delaney, Eddie Keher and Mick Brennan scored goals. Limerick lost that game by 3–19 to 1–13.

Cregan's side contested the Munster SHC finals of 1975 and 1976; however, Cork won on both occasions, as Limerick went into decline. They were completely trounced again in 1979 on a score line of 2–14 to 0–9 as Cork won a record-equaling fifth Munster SHC title in-a-row.

In 1980, Cork were going for an unprecedented sixth consecutive Munster SHC title. For the fourth time in six years Limerick provided the opposition in the provincial decider. After an exciting seventy minutes Cork's hopes were dashed by 2–14 to 2–10 as Cregan collected a third Munster SHC medal. This victory allowed Limerick a save passage to the 1980 All-Ireland SHC final, with Galway as opponent. Galway got off to a good start and took a 2–7 to 1–5 lead at half-time. Cregan had other ideas and single-handedly launched the Limerick counter-attack. Over the course of the game he scored 2–7, including an overhead goal and a point in which he showed the ball to Conor Hayes and nonchalantly drove the ball over the bar. It was not enough to stem the tide and Galway went on to win the game. It was the county's first All-Ireland SHC title since 1923 and, ironically, Limerick were the defeated team on that occasion as well. In spite of the defeat, Cregan was presented with a third All-Star award.

At the 1981 general election, Cregan was an unsuccessful Fianna Fáil candidate in the Limerick East constituency.

Limerick retained the provincial crown in 1981. Clare were defeated on that occasion by 3–12 to 2–9, giving Cregan his fourth Munster SHC medal. The subsequent All-Ireland SHC semi-final saw Limerick again take on Galway. In a low-scoring game both sides finished level and a replay was necessary. The second game took place a fortnight later at Croke Park, and it turned out to be an exciting affair. Both sides upped their game; however, Limerick still lost by 4–16 to 2–17.

At this stage Cregan was in his 36th year and many players would contemplate retirement from the game. Cregan, however, continued playing for his county for another few seasons; however, Cork returned as the dominant force in Munster. He eventually retired from inter-county hurling in 1983.

=== Provincial ===
Cregan also lined out with Munster in the inter-provincial hurling competition. He first played for his province in 1968 as Munster defeated Leinster giving Cregan his first Railway Cup medal. He collected a second Railway Cup title in 1969. Cregan was a regular on the team throughout the 1970s; however, Leinster dominated the competition for the majority of the decade. He won a third and final Railway Cup medal in 1980.

== Managerial career ==
Éamonn Cregan
Sport
Club management
- Years: Club
- 2007–: Lixnaw
	1	0	0
Inter-county management
- Years: Team
- 1986–1988 1992–1996 1997–2002: Limerick; Offaly; Limerick
Inter-county titles as manager
County	League	Province	All-Ireland
Offaly	1	2	2

In retirement from playing Cregan became involved in coaching and training teams. He served as manager of several inter-county and club sides.

=== Offaly ===
Cregan took charge of the Offaly senior inter-county team in late 1992. At the time Offaly were an up-and-coming hurling team in the championship; however, it would be 1994 before Cregan's charges first tasted success. That year Offaly contested the Leinster SHC final with Wexford providing the opposition. That game saw Cregan's side defeated Wexford by 1–18 to 0–14, giving Offaly a first Leinster Senior Hurling Championship (SHC) title under Cregan's tenure. The subsequent All-Ireland SHC semi-final saw Offaly defeat Galway by 2–13 to 1–10. Ironically, the 1994 All-Ireland SHC saw Offaly take on Cregan's own native-county of Limerick. The game was a close affair; however, Limerick went five points ahead with four minutes left in the game and it looked as if they were about to win a first title in twenty-one years. The next five minutes, however, produced one of the most exciting and explosive endings to an All-Ireland SHC final ever. Johnny Dooley was about to take a close-in free and was given the signal from Cregan to take a point. Dooley had only one thing on his mind and scored a goal to turn the game on its head. Limerick lost possession after the puck-out and Offaly rampaged up the field for another goal courtesy of Pat O'Connor. Four unanswered points followed and Offaly captured the victory by 3–16 to 2–13. The victory, however, came at a cost to Cregan. He was the first outside manager to defeat his own native-county in an All-Ireland SHC final, and, naturally, he had mixed feelings about the win. He appeared very calm at the final whistle, and seemed gutted that victory had come at the cost of beating his own county in the final.

In 1995, Cregan was still Offaly manager as his team won a second consecutive Leinster SHC title. Their display on that occasion saw Kilkenny being swept off the field by 2–16 to 2–5. It was a commendable performance and one that installed Offaly as favourites to retain the All-Ireland SHC title. Cregan's side defeated Down in the penultimate game of the championship, setting up an All-Ireland SHC final meeting with Clare. It was a first ever championship meeting of the two sides. In an exciting game both sides were level for much of the game with no side taking an extensive lead. Éamonn Taaffe, who entered the game unnoticed as a substitute, score a decisive goal for Clare with four minutes left on the clock. Johnny Dooley levelled for Offaly; however, Anthony Daly and Jamesie O'Connor scored the final points for Clare to give them a 1–13 to 2–8 victory.

In 1996 Cregan's side reached a third consecutive Leinster SHC final. Wexford provided the opposition on that occasion; however, the men from the Model County were regarded as the underdogs. In spite of this the so-called hurling revolution continued as Wexford won by 2–23 to 2–15. Cregan resigned as manager shortly afterwards.

=== Limerick ===
Cregan first became involved in team management with his own native county in the mid-1980s. It was an unhappy period for Cregan and for his Limerick team. In spite of the successes in the early 1980s, Limerick did not even reach a Munster SHC final during his first term in charge.

Almost ten years later, in 1997, Cregan was back at the helm of the Limerick senior hurling team. At the time Limerick had enjoyed two recent Munster Championship victories; however, they had not won an All-Ireland SHC title. Cregan's magic touch failed to work in Limerick; however, his side did contest the 2001 Munster SHC final. Tipperary provided the opposition on that occasion; however, Cregan's side lost the game by 2–16 to 1–17. This defeat did not mean that his side were out of the championship, as Limerick had one more chance in the All-Ireland SHC quarter-final. Wexford, however, won that game and that was the end.

Cregan remained on for one more season in 2002. After a poor performance in the Munster SHC, he tendered his resignation, citing disagreements between himself and the Limerick County Board over dual players. Assistant coach Mossie Keane was named as his replacement, but, a few days later, Cregan was reinstated. He finally resigned in June 2002, after Limerick's poor performance in the All-Ireland SHC qualifiers led to a first round defeat by Cork.

=== Lixnaw ===
Cregan took over as manager of Kerry GAA club side Lixnaw. He won the 2007 Senior County Championship in his first year in charge, when Lixnaw defeated Kilmoyley by 1–15 to 2–6 in the final.

== Media career ==
Included TV work for the 1995 Munster Senior Hurling Championship final.

== Honours ==
- In 2013, Cregan was inducted into the GAA Hall of Fame.
- In May 2020, the Irish Independent named Cregan at number sixteen in its "Top 20 hurlers in Ireland over the past 50 years".

== Career statistics ==
=== Inter-county ===
Team	Year	National League			Munster		All-Ireland		Total	
Team	Year	Division	Apps	Score	Apps	Score	Apps	Score	Apps	Score
Limerick	1964–65	Division 1B	3	2–9	1	1–2	—		4	3–11
Limerick	1965–66	Division 1B	4	3–11	2	3–6	—		6	6–17
Limerick	1966–67	Division 1B	5	0–16	1	0–1	—		6	0–17
Limerick	1967–68	Division 1B	3	0–7	1	0–3	—		4	0–10
Limerick	1968–69	Division 1B	5	4–25	1	0–3	—		6	4–28
Limerick	1969–70	Division 1B	3	3–5	3	0–2	—		6	3–7
Limerick	1970–71	Division 1A	8	6–12	3	2–4	—		11	8–16
Limerick	1971–72	Division 1A	9	3–10	1	1–0	—		10	4–10
Limerick	1972–73	Division 1A	9	3–8	2	4–1	2	0–2	13	7–11
Limerick	1973–74	Division 1A	8	0–1	2	0–0	1	0–0	11	0–1
Limerick	1974–75	Division 1A	6	0–2	3	0–1	—		9	0–3
Limerick	1975–76	Division 1B	6	9–5	2	6–2	—		8	15–7
Limerick	1976–77	Division 1A	7	2–21	1	1–6	—		8	3–27
Limerick	1977–78	Division 1B	7	3–22	1	0–1	—		8	3–23
Limerick	1978–79	Division 1A	8	4–28	3	2–17	—		11	6–45
Limerick	1979–80	Division 1A	8	5–20	2	3–11	1	2–7	11	10–38
Limerick	1980–81	Division 1A	5	6–17	3	1–8	2	1–10	10	8–35
Limerick	1981–82	Division 1B	4	4–5	1	1–4	—		5	5–9
Limerick	1982–83	Division 2	—		1	0–2	—		1	0–2
Career total			108	57–218	34	25–74	6	3–19	148	85–311

Sporting positions
Preceded by Mossie Dowling	Limerick Senior Hurling Team Captain; 1969	Succeeded by Phil Bennis
Preceded by	Clare Senior Hurling Team Manager; 1984–1985	Succeeded by Séamus Durack
Preceded by Noel Drumgoole	Limerick Senior Hurling Team Manager; 1986–1988	Succeeded by Liam O'Donoghue
Preceded by Pádraig Horan	Offaly Senior Hurling Team Manager; 1992–1996	Succeeded by John McIntyre
Preceded by Tom Ryan	Limerick Senior Hurling Team Manager; 1997–2002	Succeeded by Dave Keane
Achievements
Preceded by Ollie Walsh (Kilkenny)	All-Ireland SHC winning manager 1994	Succeeded by Ger Loughnane (Clare)
