= Cathal Naughton =

Irish hurler

Personal information
- Native name: Cathal Ó Neachtáin (Irish)
- Born: 3 July 1987 (age 39) Newtownshandrum, County Cork, Ireland
- Occupation: Sales Representative
- Height: 6 ft 1 in (185 cm)

Sport
- Sport: Hurling
- Position: Left wing-forward
Club
Years	Club	Apps (scores)
2004-2016	Newtownshandrum	55 (14-99)
Club titles
- Cork titles: 2
- Munster titles: 2
- All-Ireland Titles: 0
College
- Years: College
- Cork Institute of Technology
College titles
- Fitzgibbon titles: 0
Inter-county*
Years	County	Apps (scores)
2006–2013	Cork	36 (1–33)
Inter-county titles
- Munster titles: 1
- All-Irelands: 0
- NHL: 0
- All Stars: 0
- *Inter County team apps and scores correct as of 17:07, 29 July 2014.

Cathal Naughton (born 3 July 1987) is an Irish retired hurler who played for Cork Senior Championship club newtownshandrum. He played for the Cork senior hurling team for 8 years, during which time he usually lined out as a left wing-forward.

Naughton began his hurling career at club level with Newtownshandrum. He broke onto the club's top adult team as a 16-year-old in 2004 and was at left corner-forward when the club lost the All-Ireland final in 2006. He enjoyed his greatest successes in 2005 and 2009 when the club won the Cork Championship and Munster Championship title. Naughton made 55 championship appearances at senior championship level for the club, while his early prowess also saw him selected for the Cork Institute of Technology in the Fitzgibbon Cup.

At inter-county level, Naughton was part of the Cork minor team that won back-to-back Munster Championships in 2004 and 2005 before later winning a Munster Championship with the under-21 team in 2007. He joined the Cork senior team in 2006. Naughton began his senior career as an impact sub before eventually becoming a regular member of the starting fifteen and made a combined total of 71 National League and Championship appearances in a career that ended with his last game in 2013. During that time he won a Munster Championship medal as a panel member in 2006. Naughton's career ended after effectively being dropped from the panel at the start of the 2014 season.

== Playing career ==
=== Soccer ===
Naughton enjoyed a successful soccer career with Charleville A.F.C. with whom he won many honours and also played with the Limerick Schoolboy League in the Kennedy Cup. He spent a year at the Nottingham Forest F.C. academy in his teens and he was offered a contract with the club but declined the offer in favour of continuing his education at home. He was also invited to try out for Manchester City F.C. At home, Naughton played representative soccer with Ireland on four occasions at under-17 level.

=== Colleges ===
In 2005 Naughton was captain of the Charleville CBS senior hurling team. He won a Munster Colleges Senior B Hurling Championship medal following a 3–9 to 0–8 defeat of St. Clement's College. Charleville CBS later faced Enniscorthy CBS in the All-Ireland decider. Two goals by Paul O'Neill and substitute David Murphy in a twenty-minute period of extra time, allied to an goalkeeping performance from Niall Maher, were the decisive factors in Enniscorthy CBS's 3–8 to 0–13 victory.

=== Club ===
In 2005 Naughton had just turned eighteen-years-old when he was a key member of the Newtownshandrum senior hurling team that faced Cloyne in the championship decider. In spite of a stop-start nature to the game, Newtown built up an unassailable seven-point half-time lead. The North Cork club eventually won by 0–15 to 0–9, with Naughton collecting his first championship medal. He later added a Munster medal to his collection following a narrow 0–16 to 1–12 defeat of Ballygunner. On 17 March 2006 Newtownshandrum had the chance to take a second All-Ireland crown in three years when the team faced Portumna in the All-Ireland decider. Seventeen-year-old Joe Canning hit 1–6 while also setting up Niall Hayes for a second goal, as Naughton's side faced a 2–8 to 1–6 defeat.

After failing to retain their championship titles and defeat to Erin's Own in the county final in 2007, Newtownshandrum reached the decider again in 2009. A massive 3–22 to 1–12 defeat of reigning champions and favourites Sarsfield's gave Naughton a second championship medal. Once again it was Ballygunner who provided the opposition in the provincial decider. Newtown stood strong in the face of a 'Gunner comeback and a 2–11 to 2–9 victory gave Naughton a second Munster medal.

=== Inter-county ===
Naughton first lined out with Cork in the minor grade in 2004. He won his first Munster medal that year as Cork ended Tipperary's hopes of four-in-a-row with a 2–13 to 3–8 victory.

The following year Naughton was still eligible for the Cork minor team as he captured a second consecutive Munster medal following a 2–18 to 1–15 defeat of Limerick. Cronin top scored with 1–10.

Naughton subsequently joined the Cork under-21 team. He won a Munster medal in this grade in 2007 following a 1–20 to 0–10 trouncing of Waterford.

On 9 April 2006 Naughton made his senior debut in an 0–18 to 0–16 National Hurling League defeat by Clare. He was later included on Cork's championship panel, winning a Munster medal as a non-playing substitute following Cork's 2–14 to 1–14 defeat of Tipperary. He made his championship debut on 6 August 2006 in a narrow 1–16 to 1–15 defeat of Waterford. Naughton was surprisingly sprung from the bench in that game and scored 1–1 inside two minutes. His introduction was seen as the winning of the match for Cork. On 3 September 2006 Cork faced Kilkenny in the All-Ireland decider. Neither side took a considerable lead, however, Kilkenny had a vital goal from Aidan Fogarty. Cork were in arrears coming into the final few minutes, however, Ben O'Connor goaled for Cork. Naughton was introduced as a substitute once again, however, he failed to repeat the heroics of the semi-final as the Cats denied the Rebels the three-in-a-row on a score line of 1–16 to 1–13.

Naughton lined out in his second Munster decider as a substitute in 2013, however, Cork faced a 0–24 to 0–15 defeat by Limerick. On 8 September 2013 he lined out against Clare in his first All-Ireland final. Three second-half goals through Conor Lehane, Anthony Nash and Pa Cronin, and a tenth point of the game from Patrick Horgan gave Cork a one-point lead as injury time came to an end. A last-gasp point from corner-back Domhnall O'Donovan earned Clare a 0–25 to 3–16 draw. The replay on 28 September was regarded as one of the best in recent years. Clare's Shane O'Donnell was a late addition to the team, and went on to score a hat-trick of goals in the first nineteen minutes of the game. Patrick Horgan top scored for Cork, however, further goals from Conor McGrath and Darach Honan secured a 5–16 to 3–16 victory for Clare.

=== Inter-provincial ===
Naughton has also lined out Munster in the inter-provincial series of games. He played once for his province in a 2–14 to 1–12 semi-final defeat of Ulster in 2008.

== Personal life ==
Naughton is the youngest of three sons born to Dermot (1958–2009) and Josephine Naughton. He was educated at the local national school in Newtownshandrum before later attending Charleville CBS. He later completed a marketing degree at the Cork Institute of Technology before later completing a master's degree in business. Naughton works as a business development manager with Classic Drinks and Christys Wines and Spirits.

== Career statistics ==
=== Club ===
Team	Season	Cork		Munster		All-Ireland		Total	
Team	Season	Apps	Score	Apps	Score	Apps	Score	Apps	Score
Newtownshandrum	2004-05	3	0-02	—		—		3	0-02
Newtownshandrum	2005-06	3	0-11	2	0-05	2	0-03	7	0-19
Newtownshandrum	2006-07	4	1-03	—		—		4	1-03
Newtownshandrum	2007-08	5	1-10	—		—		5	1-10
Newtownshandrum	2008-09	3	0-04	—		—		3	0-04
Newtownshandrum	2009-10	5	0-17	3	0-05	1	0-01	9	0-23
Newtownshandrum	2010-11	5	3-06	—		—		5	3-06
Newtownshandrum	2011-12	4	3-08	—		—		4	3-08
Newtownshandrum	2012-13	3	2-03	—		—		3	2-03
Newtownshandrum	2013-14	2	1-05	—		—		2	1-05
Newtownshandrum	2014-15	3	1-02	—		—		3	1-02
Newtownshandrum	2015-16	3	0-07	—		—		3	0-07
Newtownshandrum	2016-17	4	2-07	—		—		4	2-07
Career total		47	14-85	5	0-10	3	0-04	55	14-99

=== Inter-county ===
Team	Year	National League			Munster		All-Ireland		Total	
Team	Year	Division	Apps	Score	Apps	Score	Apps	Score	Apps	Score
Cork	2006	Division 1A	2	0-04	0	0-00	1	1-01	3	1-05
Cork	2007	Division 1A	5	1-04	2	0-01	5	0-01	12	1-06
Cork	2008	Division 1A	5	1-07	1	0-04	4	0-08	10	1-19
Cork	2009	Division 1	4	0-06	1	0-00	2	0-01	7	0-07
Cork	2010	Division 1	5	1-10	4	0-07	2	0-03	11	1-20
Cork	2011	Division 1	6	1-05	1	0-00	3	0-00	10	1-05
Cork	2012	Division 1A	6	3-09	1	0-01	4	0-05	11	3-15
Cork	2013	Division 1A	2	0-02	1	0-01	4	0-00	7	0-03
Career total			35	7-47	11	0-14	25	1-19	71	8-80

== Honours ==
=== Team ===
Charleville CBS

- Munster Colleges Senior B Hurling Championship (1): 2005

Newtownshandrum

- Munster Senior Club Hurling Championship (2): 2005, 2009
- Cork Senior Club Hurling Championship (2): 2005, 2009

Cork

- Munster Senior Hurling Championship (1): 2006 (sub)
- Munster Under-21 Hurling Championship (1): 2007
- Munster Minor Hurling Championship (2): 2004, 2005
