= Ger Oakley =

Irish hurler

Personal information
- Native name: Gearóid Mac Darach (Irish)
- Born: Carrig, County Tipperary

Sport
- Sport: Hurling
- Position: Midfield
Club
- Years: Club
- 1996–: Carrig & Riverstown
Club titles
- Offaly titles: 0
Inter-county
- Years: County
- 1997–2010: Offaly
Inter-county titles
- All-Irelands: 1
- NHL: 2
- All Stars: 0

Ger Oakley (born 1978 in Carrig, County Tipperary) is an Irish sportsman. He plays hurling with his local club Carrig & Riverstown and was a member of the Offaly senior county team from 1997 to 2010. Oakley retired from inter-county hurling in late 2010 to concentrate more on farming.

Sporting positions
Preceded by Kevin Brady	Offaly Senior Hurling Captain; 2009-2010	Succeeded by Brian Carroll
Achievements
Preceded by Brendan Murtagh (Westmeath)	National Hurling League Final (Div 2) winning captain 2009	Succeeded by Diarmuid Lyng (Wexford)
