= Carrig (electoral division) =

Electoral division in County Tipperary

Coordinates: 53.0626°N 7.9721°W

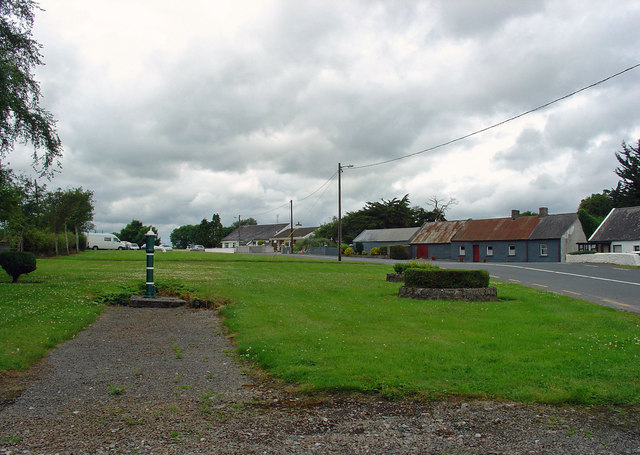
The Green

Carrig (Irish: An Charraig) is a settlement and electoral division in the historical barony of Ormond Lower, County Tipperary, Ireland. It is located on the N52 road between Birr and Borrisokane. The early medieval Christian psalter known as the Faddan More Psalter was discovered near here in July 2006 in a peat bog.

From 2016 to 2020, Carrig was within the Dáil constituency of Offaly. Since 2020, it has been part of the Tipperary.

== Sport ==
Carrig and Riverstown GAA is the local Gaelic Athletic Association club. The club is located in the areas of Carrig, and Riverstown, both of which are in County Tipperary, however the club is also considered to be partly in County Offaly, as Birr is the nearest town. Ger Oakley, a former inter-county hurler with Offaly, is a member of the club.
