= Peter Atkinson (hurler) =

Irish hurler

Personal information
- Native name: Peadar Mac Aidicín (Irish)
- Born: Bunclody, County Wexford

Sport
- Sport: Hurling
Club
- Years: Club
- ?-?: HWH–Bunclody
Club titles
- Wexford titles: 0
Inter-county
- Years: County
- 2009-2013: Wexford
Inter-county titles
- Leinster titles: 0
- All-Irelands: 0
- NHL: 1 (Div 2)
- All Stars: 0

Peter Atkinson is an Irish sportsperson. He plays hurling with his local club HWH–Bunclody and was a member of the Wexford senior inter-county team from 2009 to 2013.

== Playing career ==
Atkinson made his senior debut against Offaly on 30 May 2009 after being called up by Wexford manager Colm Bonnar. He won his first senior hurling medal in 2010 after winning The National hurling league Division 2. But Wexford were soon early exited by Galway in Leinster and Tipperary in the qualifiers.
