= Ruairí Dunbar =

Irish hurler

Personal information
- Native name: Ruairí Dunbar (Irish)
- Born: 1987 (age 38–39) County Carlow, Ireland

Sport
- Sport: Hurling
- Position: Forward
Club
- Years: Club
- Carlow Town
Club titles
- Carlow titles: 0
Inter-county
- Years: County
- 2006-: Carlow
Inter-county titles
- Leinster titles: 0
- All-Irelands: 0
- NHL: 0
- All Stars: 0

Ruairí Dunbar (born 1987) is an Irish sportsperson. He plays hurling with the Carlow senior inter-county hurling team. He won Christy Ring Cup titles with Carlow in 2008 and 2009.

Unnamed sources have claimed that Ruairí has been offered the managers role for Clare hurling. However he turned this down stating his undying loyalty to Carlow.

In 2007 Henry Shefflin stated "I wish I could hurl as well as Ruairí".

Ruairí was elected to the team of the decade from 2000 - 2010
