= Réabhlóid GAA =

Irish documentary

- Genre: Documentary
- Directed by: Ronan O'Donoghue
- Starring: Michael Cleary; Johnny Dooley; Davy Fitzgerald; Liam Griffin; Ger Loughnane; Johnny Pilkington; Éamonn Scallan; Martin Storey; Brian Whelahan
- Narrated by: Diarmuid Lyng

Production
- Running time: 1 hour
- Production company: Loosehorse

Original release
- Network: TG4
- Release: 16 December 2020

Réabhlóid GAA is a documentary about hurling during the 1990s. The title translates into English as "GAA Revolution".

The period covered marked a transition from the dominance of the sport's traditional "big three" (Cork, Kilkenny and Tipperary) to the emergence of Offaly, Clare and Wexford as All-Ireland Senior Hurling Championship winners in successive years. Offaly began the run by winning their third title with a comeback victory over Limerick in 1994. Clare then won a first title since 1914 in 1995, while Wexford won a first title since 1968 in 1996, Clare following with another title in 1997. The 1998 Clare v Offaly trilogy is also covered.

Former Wexford hurler Diarmuid Lyng narrated. TG4 first aired Réabhlóid GAA on 16 December 2020. The broadcaster repeated it on 17 March 2021 (Saint Patrick's Day).
