= Declan O'Dwyer =

Irish hurler

Personal information
- Native name: Déaglán Ó Duibhir (Irish)
- Born: 1 June 1987 (age 39) Dublin, Ireland
- Height: 1.85 m (6 ft 1 in)

Sport
- Sport: Hurling
- Position: Left half forward
Club
- Years: Club
- 2004-: Naomh Ólaf
Inter-county
- Years: County
- 2011-: Dublin
Inter-county titles
- NHL: 1

Declan O'Dwyer (born 1 June 1987) is a hurler who plays for Naomh Ólaf and has represented Dublin in the past.

O'Dwyer won a Leinster Minor Hurling Championship medal with Dublin in 2005.

He won the Leinster Under-21 Hurling Championship with Dublin against Offaly in July 2007. It was Dublin's first Under-21 trophy since 1972.

More recently he played a pivotal role in Dublin's league campaign which brought them to their first Div 1 league title since 1939.

Declan learned his trade at Naomh Olaf under the management of Fran Meegan. Mr Meegan passed on his wealth of knowledge to Declan from a young age, coaching and mentoring him all through his hurling career. Declan also played under the tenure of Liam McLoughlin at St. Benildus College, Kilmacud, Dublin. He achieved success at both U16 and Senior level with St. Benildus.

== Honours ==
- National Hurling League (1): 2011
- Leinster Under-21 Hurling Championship (1): 2007
- Leinster Minor Hurling Championship (1): 2005
