= Diarmuid Lyng =

Irish hurler and Gaelic footballer

Personal information
- Native name: Diarmuid Ó Loinn (Irish)
- Nickname: Gizzy
- Born: 1981 (age 44–45) Wexford, Ireland
- Occupation: Primary school teacher
- Height: 6 ft 0 in (183 cm)

Sport
- Sport: Hurling
- Position: Left wing-forward
Club
- Years: Club
- 1999–2020: St Martin's Tralee Parnells
Club titles
- Wexford titles: 1
Inter-county*
Years	County	Apps (scores)
2004–2013	Wexford	22 (1–82)
Inter-county titles
- Leinster titles: 1
- All-Irelands: 0
- NHL: 0
- All Stars: 0
- *Inter County team apps and scores correct as of 14:45, 25 June 2012.

Diarmuid Lyng (born 1981 in Wexford, Ireland) is an Irish sportsman. He plays hurling and Gaelic football with his local club St Martin's and was a member of the Wexford senior county hurling team between 2004 and 2013.

== Playing career ==
Lyng's nickname "Gizzy" was acquired in his childhood and is a reference to the character Gizmo from the movie Gremlins. A graduate of Froebel College of Education, Lyng has worked as a primary school teacher.

=== Club ===
Lyng plays both hurling and Gaelic football with his local club St Martin's in Piercestown.

In 1999, Lyng was still a member of the club's minor team when he made his senior debut as a seventeen-year-old. He was a non-playing substitute when St Martin's defeated Rathnure by two points to win the club's first county championship.

After losing a final in the meantime, St Martin's were back in the championship decider in 2008. A 1–13 to 1–8 defeat of Oulart–The Ballagh gave Lyng his first county title on the field of play.

He later joined Kerry side Tralee Parnells.

=== Inter-county ===
Lyng first came to prominence with Wexford as a member of the county's minor team in 1999. He had little success in this grade, losing a Leinster MHC decider to Kilkenny. He later joined the Wexford under-21 team, winning back-to-back Leinster U21HC titles in 2001 and 2002.

Lyng made his senior debut for Wexford in a National Hurling League game against Kilkenny in 2004. He remained on the fringes of the team and was a non-playing substitute when Wexford won a Leinster SHC title. He made his championship debut later that year when he came on as a substitute against Cork in the All-Ireland SHC semi-final.

By 2005 Lyng was a regular on the Wexford starting fifteen; however, the Slanysliders had to play second fiddle to Kilkenny in the provincial championship. Lyng lined out in four consecutive Leinster SHC finals; however, Kilkenny won all four of them.

In 2009, Lyng was appointed Wexford captain. He retained that position in 2010 and guided the team to a National League Division 2 title following a defeat of Clare.

=== Inter-provincial ===
Lyng lined out with Leinster on a number of occasions in the inter-provincial series. He won two Railway Cup medals in 2006 and 2009.

== Personal life ==
In no way is this against the cryotherapy chamber. It's useful, it's good for some people, but for me and where I was? No, it was a bad thing because I didn't ask the pertinent questions, I was in the ego-zone... I stayed in for five minutes when I should probably have only stayed for three, but I was like 'I can do what I want!' That mentality was going on all the time... My body was shocked to its core. I knew, straight away, that I'd done something wrong. There was an ice in my bones, a coldness, and it was deeper in me than I'd ever felt before.

— Lyng, reflecting in 2013 on his experience of the cryotherapy chamber

[T]he body just couldn't come back after it. It was like I was completely frozen.

— Lyng, reflecting in 2025 on the aftermath of his experience in the cryotherapy chamber

Lyng was affected by an experience he had while captaining Wexford, when he entered a cryotherapy chamber as part of his efforts to recover from a hamstring injury. After this he was unable to eat, to drink, or to sleep. He has stated that this was an effect the cryotherapy chamber had on him personally, rather than any belief that it is bad for others. He referred to a stomach parasite he had previously been diagnosed with as likely causing the particular effect the cryotherapy chamber had on him.

Lyng set off in late 2010 for what became 17 months of travel. He began in the United States and, while there, he worked in an Irish pub in New York. His intention was to gather money so that he could continue to visit other parts of the world. He went to Thailand and to Vietnam. He was also in Nepal and Russia. A Chilean acquaintance in New York recommended he spend time at a Buddhist monastery.

Having had a spiritual awakening after all those experiences (and particularly affected by a National Hurling League game he played when he came back to Ireland, in which Wexford lost to Carlow: "We got maybe 15 points and I got 12 of them. I felt I was already totally compromised, and yet I was still carrying way too much."), Lyng moved to Corca Dhuibhne, where he met his partner Siobhán de Paor, a spoken word artist. He co-founded Wild Irish with her. Wild Irish endeavours to assist their compatriots with mental health and societal stress by spending time in nature with Ireland's indigenous language, Gaeilge.

As of 2025, the couple lived with their children in a farmhouse near Mullinavat in rural County Kilkenny.

Lyng was given an episode of Laochra Gael, broadcast on 12 March 2020.

He narrated the documentary Réabhlóid GAA, which TG4 premiered in December 2020.

In 2025, he and his partner Siobhán de Paor were the subject of the documentary Immrám.

== Honours ==
- 2 Leinster Under-21 Hurling Championship: 2001, 2002
- 2 Railway Cup: 2006, 2009
- 1 Leinster Senior Hurling Championship: 2004
- 1 National Hurling League Division 1: 2010
- 1 Wexford Senior Hurling Championship: 2008

Sporting positions
Preceded by Rory Jacob	Wexford Senior Hurling Captain; 2009–2010	Succeeded by Darren Stamp
Achievements
Preceded by Ger Oakley (Offaly)	National Hurling League Final (Div 2) winning captain 2010	Succeeded by Gavin O'Mahony (Limerick)
