= Alan McCrabbe =

Irish hurler

Personal information
- Native name: Ailéin Mac Crabbe (Irish)
- Born: 29 April 1986 (age 40) Dublin, Ireland

Sport
- Sport: Hurling
- Position: Midfield
Club
- Years: Club
- 2004–: Craobh Chiaráin
Club titles
- Dublin titles: 1
Inter-county*
Years	County	Apps (scores)
2006–2015	Dublin	24 (1-101)
Inter-county titles
- Leinster titles: 1
- All-Irelands: 0
- NHL: 1
- All Stars: 1
- *Inter County team apps and scores correct as of 23:04, 1 June 2011.

Alan McCrabbe (born 29 April 1986 in Dublin) is an Irish sportsperson. He plays hurling with his local club Craobh Chiaráin and has been a member of the Dublin senior inter-county team since 2006.

== Playing career ==
=== Club ===
McCrabbe plays his club hurling with his local club Craobh Chiaráin and has enjoyed some success. In 2006 he lined out in his first county senior championship final, with Ballyboden St. Enda's providing the opposition. A narrow 2–10 to 2–8 score line gave Craobh Chiaráin the victory and gave McCrabbe a county winners' medal. Craobh Chiaráin subsequently represented Dublin in the Leinster club series of games. After a defeat of Mount Leinster Rangers, McCrabbe's side were defeated by Birr in the provincial semi-final. McCrabbe was later named on the Dublin Blue Stars team for 2006 at right wing-forward.

Three years later in 2009 McCrabbe lined out in his second county final. Three-in-a-row hopefuls Ballyboden St. Enda's were the opponents once again. On this occasion McCrabbe's side were comprehensively defeated.

=== Minor & under-21 ===
McCrabbe first came to prominence on the inter-county scene as a member of the Dublin minor hurling team. In 2004 'the Dubs' reached the provincial decider, with Kilkenny providing the opposition. 'The Cats' continued their dominance of the Leinster Championship and a 1–14 to 1–4 victory gave them a fourteenth provincial title in fifteen years.

McCrabbe later joined the Dublin under-21 team. He lined out in the leinster decider in that grade in 2005, however, after an exciting hour of hurling an Eoin Larkin-inspired Kilkenny claimed a 0–17 to 1–10 victory.

In 2006 both Kilkenny and McCrabbe's Dublin went to battle again in the provincial under-21 decider. Kilkenny survived a second half fight-back from 'the Dubs' to claim a fourth consecutive Erin Leinster title, winning by 2–18 to 2–10. It was McCrabbe's second consecutive defeat in the provincial under-21 final.

In 2007 Dublin qualified for a third consecutive Leinster under-21 final. Offaly were the opponents on this occasion, as McCrabbe hoped to claim a winners' medal at the third attempt. 'The Dubs' finally broke through and a 2–18 to 3–9 defeat of Offaly gave McCrabbe a Leinster under-21 winners' medal at last. It was Dublin's first title in that grade since 1972. A subsequent defeat of Cork allowed Dublin to advance to an All-Ireland final meeting with Galway. The westerners got off to a dream start and took an early lead. At the long whistle McCrabbe's side were disappointingly defeated by 5–11 to 0–12. This was his last outing with the Dublin under-21 hurlers.

=== Senior ===
By this stage McCrabbe had joined the Dublin senior hurling team. He made his championship debut in the opening round of the Leinster Championship against Westmeath. A narrow 0–13 to 0–11 defeat resulted in Dublin being banished to the All-Ireland qualifiers. Defeats by Offaly and Clare saw McCrabbe's side exit the championship and enter into a relegation battle with Westmeath. 'The Dubs' reversed their opening defeat with a 0–16 to 0–8 victory and preserved their Liam MacCarthy Cup status.

In 2007 McCrabbe missed Dublin's opening defeat by Wexford in the Leinster semi-final. His side later exited the championship after back-to-back defeats by Cork and Tipperary in the All-Ireland qualifiers.

In 2008 McCrabbe surprised many when he decided to withdraw from the Dublin panel just weeks before their opening game in the championship. He was joined by Keith Dunne who also withdrew from the game.

McCrabbe returned to the Dublin panel in 2009, just as new manager Anthony Daly took charge. After a good showing in the National Hurling League, Dublin got off to a great start in the championship wins over Antrim and old rivals Wexford. A Leinster final date with Kilkenny was the reward for these wins. While many predicted a rout, 'the Dubs' gave 'the Cats' something of a scare. McCrabbe finished the game as Dublin's top scorer after notching up twelve points. A 2–18 to 0–18 score line resulted in a defeat for Dublin. In spite of this defeat Dublin still had a chance of making the All-Ireland final. For the first time since 1961 a Dublin team entered the All-Ireland series of games with a quarter-final meeting with Limerick. A superb display by Gavin O'Mahony inspired Limerick to a 2–18 to 1–17 victory. McCrabbe was later named at midfield on the All-Star team. It was Dublin's first hurling All-Star award since Brian McMahon in 1990.

=== Inter-provincial ===
McCrabbe has also represented Leinster in the inter-provincial series of games.

== Career statistics ==
Team	Year	National League			Leinster		All-Ireland		Total	
Team	Year	Division	Apps	Score	Apps	Score	Apps	Score	Apps	Score
Dublin	2006	Division 2A	7	1-06	1	0-00	3	0-04	11	1-10
Dublin	2007	Division 1B	1	0-00	0	0-00	2	0-04	3	0-04
Dublin	2008	Division 1A	2	0-00	0	0-00	0	0-00	2	0-00
Dublin	2009	Division 1	6	1-50	3	1-31	1	0-08	10	2-89
Dublin	2010	Division 1	7	1-47	2	0-11	2	0-17	11	1-75
Dublin	2011	Division 1	2	0-00	3	0-06	2	0-01	7	0-07
Dublin	2012	Division 1A	5	0-08	1	0-01	1	0-01	7	0-10
Dublin	2013	Division 1B	0	0-00	0	0-00	0	0-00	0	0-00
Dublin	2014	Division 1B	6	0-38	2	0-12	1	0-05	9	0-55
Total			36	3-149	12	1-61	12	0-40	60	4-250
