= List of hurlers with an All-Ireland Senior Hurling Championship runners-up medal =

This is a list of hurlers who have received a runners-up medal for playing on a losing team in the final of the All-Ireland Senior Hurling Championship.

The list only includes hurlers who won a medal on the field of play in the final.

Player	Team	Titles won	Years	Notes
Clinton Hennessy	Waterford	1	2008	
Eoin Murphy	Waterford	1	2008	
Declan Prendergast	Waterford	1	2008	
Aidan Kearney	Waterford	1	2008	
Tony Browne	Waterford	1	2008	
Ken McGrath	Waterford	1	2008	
Kevin Moran	Waterford	1	2008	
Michael 'Brick' Walsh	Waterford	1	2008	Captain in 2008
Jamie Nagle	Waterford	1	2008	
Dan Shanahan	Waterford	1	2008	
Seamus Prendergast	Waterford	1	2008	
Stephen Molumphy	Waterford	1	2008	
Eoin McGrath	Waterford	1	2008	
Eoin Kelly	Waterford	1	2008	
John Mullane	Waterford	1	2008	
Jack Kennedy	Waterford	1	2008	
Paul Flynn	Waterford	1	2008	
Shane O'Sullivan	Waterford	1	2008	
Dave Bennett	Waterford	1	2008	
Tom Feeney	Waterford	1	2008	
Brian Murray	Limerick	1	2007	
Damien Reale	Limerick	1	2007	Co-captain in 2007
Stephen Lucey	Limerick	1	2007	
Séamus Hickey	Limerick	1	2007	
Peter Lawlor	Limerick	1	2007	
Brian Geary	Limerick	1	2007	Co-captain in 2007
Dónal O'Grady	Limerick	1	2007	
Mike O'Brien	Limerick	1	2007	
Mike FitzGerald	Limerick	1	2007	
Ollie Moran	Limerick	1	2007	
Seán O'Connor	Limerick	1	2007	
Andrew O'Shaughnessy	Limerick	1	2007	
Brian Begley	Limerick	1	2007	
Donie Ryan	Limerick	1	2007	
Niall Moran	Limerick	1	2007	
James O'Brien	Limerick	1	2007	
Kevin Tobin	Limerick	1	2007	
Mark O'Riordan	Limerick	1	2007	
Brian Murphy	Cork	1	2006	
Neil Ronan	Cork	1	2006	
Kieran Murphy	Cork	1	2006	
Cian O'Connor	Cork	1	2006	
Cathal Naughton	Cork	1	2006	
Conor Cusack	Cork	1	2006	
Liam Donoghue	Galway	1	2005	Captain in 2005
Damien Joyce	Galway	1	2005	
Tony Óg Regan	Galway	1	2005	
Shane Kavanagh	Galway	1	2005	
David Collins	Galway	1	2005	
David Forde	Galway	1	2005	
Alan Kerins	Galway	1	2005	
Ger Farragher	Galway	1	2005	
Niall Healy	Galway	1	2005	
Damien Hayes	Galway	1	2005	
Kevin Broderick	Galway	1	2005	
Kevin Hayes	Galway	1	2005	
Noel Hickey	Kilkenny	1	2004	
Noel Hickey	Kilkenny	1	2004	
James Ryall	Kilkenny	1	2004	
Tommy Walsh	Kilkenny	1	2004	
J. J. Delaney	Kilkenny	1	2004	
Derek Lyng	Kilkenny	1	2004	
Ken Coogan	Kilkenny	1	2004	
John Hoyne	Kilkenny	1	2004	
James 'Cha' Fitzpatrick	Kilkenny	1	2004	
Martin Comerford	Kilkenny	1	2004	Captain in 2004
Eddie Brennan	Kilkenny	1	2004	
Conor Phelan	Kilkenny	1	2004	
Seán Dowling	Kilkenny	1	2004	
Dónal Óg Cusack	Cork	2	2003, 2006	
Wayne Sherlock	Cork	2	2003, 2006	
Diarmuid O'Sullivan	Cork	2	2003, 2006	
Pat Mulcahy	Cork	2	2003, 2006	
Tom Kenny	Cork	2	2003, 2006	
Ronan Curran	Cork	2	2003, 2006	
Seán Óg Ó hAilpín	Cork	2	2003, 2006	
John Gardiner	Cork	2	2003, 2006	
Mickey O'Connell	Cork	1	2003	
Ben O'Connor	Cork	2	2003, 2006	
Niall McCarthy	Cork	2	2003, 2006	
Timmy McCarthy	Cork	2	2003, 2006	
Setanta Ó hAilpín	Cork	1	2003	
Joe Deane	Cork	2	2003, 2006	
Alan Browne	Cork	1	2003	Captain in 2003
Jerry O'Connor	Cork	2	2003, 2006	
Seánie McGrath	Cork	1	2003	
Brian Quinn	Clare	1	2002	
David Hoey	Clare	1	2002	
Gerry Quinn	Clare	1	2002	
John Reddan	Clare	1	2002	
Tont Griffin	Clare	1	2002	
Alan Markham	Clare	1	2002	
Tony Carmody	Clare	1	2002	
Gerry Conssidine	Clare	1	2002	
Conor Plunkett	Clare	1	2002	
Andrew Quinn	Clare	1	2002	
Michael Crimmins	Galway	1	2001	
Greg Kennedy	Galway	1	2001	
Michael Healy	Galway	1	2001	
Ollie Canning	Galway	2	2001, 2005	
Derek Hardiman	Galway	2	2001, 2005	
Liam Hodgins	Galway	1	2001	
Cathal Moore	Galway	1	2001	
David Tierney	Galway	2	2001, 2005	
Richie Murray	Galway	2	2001, 2005	
Alan Kerins	Galway	2	2001, 2005	
Eugene Cloonan	Galway	1	2001	
Fergal Healy	Galway	2	2001, 2005	
Brian Higgins	Galway	1	2001	
Ollie Fahy	Galway	1	2001	
Stephen Byrne	Offaly	1	2000	
Simon Whelahan	Offaly	1	2000	
Niall Claffey	Offaly	1	2000	
Joe Errity	Offaly	1	2000	
Ger Oakley	Offaly	1	2000	
Gary Hanniffy	Offaly	1	2000	
Brendan Murphy	Offaly	1	2000	
John Ryan	Offaly	1	2000	
Denis Franks	Offaly	1	2000	
Paudie Mulhaire	Offaly	1	2000	
James McGarry	Kilkenny	2	1999, 2004	
Denis Byrne	Kilkenny	1	1999	Captain in 1999
Henry Shefflin	Kilkenny	2	1999, 2004	
Jim Dermody	Kilkenny	1	1998	
Tom Hickey	Kilkenny	1	1998	Captain in 1998
Michael Kavanagh	Kilkenny	3	1998, 1999, 2004	
Canice Brennan	Kilkenny	2	1998, 1999	
Liam Keoghan	Kilkenny	1	1998	
Philly Larkin	Kilkenny	2	1998, 1999	
Peter Barry	Kilkenny	3	1998, 1999, 2004	
Andy Comerford	Kilkenny	2	1998, 1999	
Brian McEvoy	Kilkenny	2	1998, 1999	
Ken O'Shea	Kilkenny	2	1998, 1999	
P.J. Delaney	Kilkenny	2	1998, 1999	
Charlie Carter	Kilkenny	2	1998, 1999	
Niall Moloney	Kilkenny	2	1998, 1999	
John Costelloe	Kilkenny	1	1998	
S. Ryan	Kilkenny	1	1998	
Brendan Cummins	Tipperary	1	1997	
Paul Shelly	Tipperary	1	1997	
Noel Sheehy	Tipperary	1	1997	
Michael Ryan	Tipperary	1	1997	
Liam Sheehy	Tipperary	1	1997	
Conal Bonnar	Tipperary	1	1997	
Tommy Dunne	Tipperary	1	1997	
Conor Gleeson	Tipperary	1	1997	Captain in 1997
Liam McGrath	Tipperary	1	1997	
Michael Cleary	Tipperary	1	1997	
Eugene O'Neill	Tipperary	1	1997	
Brian O'Meara	Tipperary	1	1997	
Liam Cahill	Tipperary	1	1997	
Mark Foley	Limerick	2	1996, 2007	
Seán O'Neill	Limerick	1	1996	
Barry Foley	Limerick	1	1996	
Owen O'Neill	Limerick	1	1996	
Pat Tobin	Limerick	2	1996, 2007	
Brian Tobin	Limerick	1	1996	
Turlough Herbert	Limerick	1	1996	
David Hughes	Offaly	1	1995	
Shane McGuckin	Offaly	1	1995	
Kevin Kinihan	Offaly	2	1995, 2000	
Martin Hanamy	Offaly	1	1995	
Brian Whelahan	Offaly	2	1995, 2000	
Hubert Rigney	Offaly	1	1995	
Kevin Martin	Offaly	2	1995, 2000	
Johnny Pilkington	Offaly	2	1995, 2000	Captain in 1995
Daithí Regan	Offaly	2	1995, 2000	
Johnny Dooley	Offaly	2	1995, 2000	
John Troy	Offaly	2	1995, 2000	
Michael Duignan	Offaly	2	1995, 2000	
Billy Dooley	Offaly	1	1995	
Pat O'Connor	Offaly	1	1995	
Declan Pilkington	Offaly	1	1995	
Joe Quaid	Limerick	2	1994, 1996	
Stephen McDonagh	Limerick	2	1994, 1996	
Mike Nash	Limerick	2	1994, 1996	
Joe Quaid	Limerick	2	1994, 1996	
Joe O'Connor	Limerick	1	1994	
Dave Clarke	Limerick	2	1994, 1996	
Ger Hegarty	Limerick	1	1994	
Declan Nash	Limerick	2	1994, 1996	
Ciarán Carey	Limerick	2	1994, 1996	
Mike Houlihan	Limerick	2	1994, 1996	
Frankie Carroll	Limerick	2	1994, 1996	
Gary Kirby	Limerick	2	1994, 1996	
Mike Galligan	Limerick	2	1994, 1996	
T. J. Ryan	Limerick	2	1994, 1996	
Pat Heffernan	Limerick	1	1994	
Damien Quigley	Limerick	2	1994, 1996	
Leo O'Connor	Limerick	1	1994	
Richie Burke	Galway	1	1993	
Joe Rabbitte	Galway	2	1993, 2001	
Peter Cooney	Galway	1	1993	
M. Killilea	Galway	1	1993	
Tom Helebert	Galway	1	1993	
P. Kelly	Galway	1	1993	
Brendan Keogh	Galway	1	1993	
J. McGrath	Galway	1	1993	Captain in 1993
L. Burke	Galway	1	1993	
J. Campbell	Galway	1	1993	
Brian Corcoran	Cork	2	1992, 2006	
D.J. Carey	Kilkenny	4	1991, 1998, 1999, 2004	
Joe Cooney	Kilkenny	4	1985, 1986, 1990, 1993	Captain in 1990
Noel Lane	Kilkenny	5	1979, 1981, 1985, 1986, 1990	Captain in 1986
Conor Hayes	Kilkenny	3	1979, 1985, 1986	
Sylvie Linnane	Kilkenny	4	1979, 1981, 1985, 1986	
P.J. Molloy	Kilkenny	4	1979, 1981, 1985, 1986	
Ray Cummins	Cork	3	1969, 1972, 1982	Winner of medals in each of three decades
Eddie Keher	Kilkenny	4	1959, 1964, 1966, 1971	Winner of medals in each of three decades
Ollie Walsh	Kilkenny	4	1959, 1964, 1966, 1971	Winner of medals in each of three decades
Lory Meagher	Kilkenny	4	1926, 1931, 1936, 1937	
