= 2005 All-Ireland Senior Hurling Championship final =

2005 All-Ireland Hurling Final
- Event: 2005 All-Ireland Senior Hurling Championship
Cork	Galway
1–21	1–16
- Date: 11 September 2005
- Venue: Croke Park, Dublin
- Man of the Match: Ben O'Connor
- Referee: Séamus Roche (Tipperary)
- Attendance: 81,136
- Weather: Dry with sunny spells

The 2005 All-Ireland Senior Hurling Championship Final was a hurling match that took place on Sunday, 11 September 2005. The match was played at Croke Park in Dublin, Ireland, to determine the winner of the 2005 All-Ireland Senior Hurling Championship. The final was contested by Cork and Galway, with Cork winning on a score line of 1–21 to 1–16. It was their second consecutive All-Ireland title. It remains as of 2026 Cork's most recent senior all Ireland final victory in hurling, with the county going on to lose its next five final appearances in 2006, 2013, 2021, 2024 and 2025 respectively.

This was the 29th championship meeting between Cork and Galway in over one hundred years of competitive games. Cork had won the previous twenty-four encounters while Galway had only put Cork to the sword four times. Furthermore, Cork had a 100% record over Galway in All-Ireland finals. Their last meeting at this stage of the championship was in 1990, when Cork staged a great comeback to take the title. Galway's four victories over Cork, on the other hand, came in games when Cork were expected to win easily. The All-Ireland semi-finals of 1975, 1979 and 1985 saw Galway catch Cork on the hop, while their most recent victory over 'the Rebels' came in an All-Ireland qualifier in 2002.

The game was shown live in Ireland on RTÉ2 as part of The Sunday Game live with match commentary provided by Ger Canning and analysis by Michael Duignan.

== Match summary ==
=== First half ===
Cork, as reigning All-Ireland champions, began the game in confident mood. Their defence stood up to the Galway attack with Ronan Curran producing his best game of the year.

It was 0–4 to 0–1 after just ten minutes, during which time Brian Corcoran looked threatening in full-forward line. All of the Cork players settled much better than their Galway counterparts, with Timmy McCarthy, Tom Kenny and Jerry O'Connor all winning most of the possession in the centre of the field.

Cork were almost totally in control by the half-way stage of the opening thirty-five minutes. It wasn't a surprise, then, to see them produce a goal in the sixteenth minute, coming from Ben O'Connor's clinical finishing. Cork were now six points in front and there were still no signs of Galway repeating their semi-final performance and springing an ambush.

Derek Hardiman and Alan Kerins launched the Galway attack. The latter scored three points against John Gardiner, resulting in the Cork number five being moved to the opposite wing. Kerins might have had a goal immediately after O’Connor's strike, only for Donal Óg Cusack bringing off a terrific save.

Niall Healy was unable to trouble full-back Diarmuid O'Sullivan, while Damien Hayes didn't get enough ball to trouble corner-back Pat Mulcahy.

There was no appreciable change in the direction of the game until about 15 minutes from half time, by which time Galway had begun to make real progress. It started with a tightening of the defence, which saw former captain Ollie Canning excel in the left corner, Tony Óg Regan starting to come to terms with the threat from Corcoran and David Collins coming into his own at left-half.

Cork gave away frees which presented Ger Farragher with two scores and saw the two midfielders each put over a score.

For the first time, Cork were beginning to struggle as a result of their lack of penetration in the half-forward line, the inability of Joe Deane to make any headway against Damien Joyce and Corcoran's struggle to make space for himself at full-forward.

Inaccuracy was another factor which lessened their influence and Galway finished the half trailing by only two points – 1–9 to 0–10.

=== Second half ===
On the restart Cork quickly recovered their form with three points in a seven-minute period. It meant that Cork's ability to pick off scores more easily than Galway gave them the confidence to hurl comfortably within themselves, without being put under serious pressure.

That self-belief also came through after Hayes put the ball in the net following another excellent save by Cusack, from Richie Murray. The margin was now down to just a single point.

The game was now at its most critical stage, when either Galway would complete their comeback, or the champions would rely on their experience to win. Essentially, the latter happened. Once again, they came out on top in defence – John Gardiner's move to left wing-back benefiting him, while captain Seán Óg Ó hAilpín was inspirational in everything he did.

Galway contributed to their own downfall through poor shooting and a disappointing response from Murray and David Forde in the half-forward line.

The advantage from the back gradually moved forward, eliciting excellent play once more from Kenny and Jerry O’Connor, who put valuable scores on the board.

Cork scored six points to Galway's two over the last 10 minutes. With Ronan Curran finishing as strongly as he started the game and Ben O’Connor picking off some great scores, Cork eased their way to victory – 1–21 to 1–16.

== Match details ==
11 September 2005
15:30 UCT+1

Cork	1–21 – 1–16	Galway
B. O'Connor (1–7); T. Kenny (0–3); J. Deane (0–3); B. Corcoran (0–2); J. O'Connor (0–2); T. McCarthy (0–2); N. McCarthy (0–1); J. Gardiner (0–1)	Report	G. Farragher (0–8); D. Hayes (1–0); A. Kerins (0–3); F. Healy (0–2); N. Healy (0–1); D. Hardiman (0–1); D. Tierney (0–1)

Croke Park, Dublin
Attendance: 81,136
Referee: Séamus Roche (Tipperary)

CORK:
GK	1	Donal Óg Cusack
RCB	2	Brian Murphy
FB	3	Diarmuid O'Sullivan (yellow card)
LCB	4	Pat Mulcahy
RWB	5	John Gardiner (yellow card)
CB	6	Ronan Curran
LWB	7	Seán Óg Ó hAilpín (c)
MD	8	Tom Kenny
MD	9	Jerry O'Connor
RWF	10	Kieran 'Fraggy' Murphy (substituted off) 39'
CF	11	Niall McCarthy (substituted off) 63'
LWF	12	Timmy McCarthy
RCF	13	Ben O'Connor
FF	14	Brian Corcoran
LCF	15	Joe Deane
Substitutes:
RWF		Neil Ronan (substituted on) 39'
CF		Kieran 'Hero' Murphy (substituted on) 63'

GALWAY:
GK	1	Liam Donoghue
RCB	2	Damien Joyce
FB	3	Tony Óg Regan (yellow card)
LCB	4	Ollie Canning
RWB	5	Derek Hardiman
CB	6	Shane Kavanagh
LWB	7	David Collins (yellow card)
M	8	Fergal Healy
M	9	David Tierney
RWF	10	Richie Murray
CF	11	David Forde (substituted off) 65'
LWF	12	Alan Kerins
RCF	13	Ger Farragher
FF	14	Niall Healy (substituted off) 57'
LCF	15	Damien Hayes
Substitutes:
FF		Kevin Broderick (substituted on) 57'
CF		Kevin Hayes (substituted on) 65'

MATCH RULES

- 70 minutes.
- Replay if scores level.
- Maximum of five substitutions.

Unused Cork Substitutes Martin Coleman, Wayne Sherlock, Cian O'Connor, John Browne, Graham Callanan, Kevin Hartnett, Jonathan O'Callaghan, Paul Morrissey, Peter Kelly, Shane O'Neill, Kieran McGann, Ronan McGregor Manager John Allen Trainers Seanie McGrath and Jerry Wallace Selectors Ger Cunningham, Patsy Morrissey, Joe O'Leary, Fred Sheedy
