= 2001 All-Ireland Senior Hurling Championship final =

2001 All-Ireland Hurling Final
- Event: 2001 All-Ireland Senior Hurling Championship
Tipperary	Galway
2-18	2-15
- Date: 9 September 2001
- Venue: Croke Park, Dublin
- Man of the Match: Tommy Dunne
- Referee: Pat O'Connor (Limerick)
- Attendance: 68,515

The 2001 All-Ireland Senior Hurling Championship Final was a hurling match that took place on Sunday, 9 September 2001. The match was played at Croke Park in Dublin, Ireland, to determine the winner of the 2001 All-Ireland Senior Hurling Championship. The final was contested by Tipperary and Galway, with Tipperary winning on a score line of 2-18 to 2-15. It was their first All-Ireland title since 1991.

== All-Ireland final ==
=== Overview ===
Sunday 9 September was the date of the All-Ireland senior hurling final between Tipperary and Galway. Tipperary last appeared in the championship decider in 1997 when they were defeated by Clare in the first all-Munster All-Ireland final. It was ten years since Tipp last win the title. Galway last saw action on All-Ireland hurling final day in 1993 when they went down to Kilkenny. They last captured the Liam MacCarthy Cup in 1988 when they defeated Tipperary. Both Tipperary and Galway last met in the All-Ireland quarter-final in 2000 when Galway emerged victorious.

=== Match report ===
At 3:30pm match referee Pat O’Connor threw-in the sliothar and the game was on. Both sides recorded an early wide as Tipperary’s Lar Corbett and Galway’s Alan Kerins both failed to hit the target in the opening exchanges. The first score of the day came from the Tipp captain Tommy Dunne who sent the sliothar between the posts from out wide on the left in the third minute. Eoin Kelly converted a free soon afterwards to give Tipperary a two-point cushion over Galway. Eugene Cloonan sent over another wide for Galway with his first attempt, however, his club mate Joe Rabbitte fought off two Tipp opponents to open Galway’s scoring account in the sixth minute. Galway were dominant throughout the next passage of play, however, their superiority in the possession stakes was not converted into scores as a series of poor wides resulted in Tipp still holding their lead. Soon after this Eoin Kelly sent the sliothar over the crossbar again to score his second point of the day from a free. He later tapped over his first point from play from an acute angle before scoring another free to give Tipp a 0-5 to 0-1 lead.

Eugene Cloonan began the fight back for Galway and sent over the Galway teams’ second point of the day. This was cancelled out almost immediately when Tommy Dunne stretched his sides lead once again. Galway’s forwards were having an off day as they hit six wides in all over the course of the first twenty minutes. A five-minute spell soon after the twenty-minute mark saw a glut of scores being recorded. Mark O'Leary gave Tipperary a huge boost when he received a pass from Declan Ryan and sent the sliothar crashing to the net. Galway responded immediately and a Eugene Cloonan free ate into Tipp’s lead once again. Eoin Kelly continued his deadly accuracy as a free taker when he converted another point after a Galway transgression. Just when it looked as if Tipp were going to run away with the game goalkeeper Brendan Cummins saved a shot from Alan Kerins from point-blank range, however, the sliothar wasn’t cleared and fell to Eugene Cloonan who slotted it into the net. Captain Tommy Dunne gave Tipperary a four-point cushion shortly afterwards when he landed a 65-metre free before John Carroll added another Tipperary point on the stroke of the twenty-sixth minute. Eoin Kelly sent over his fifth point of the day when he converted another free before Kevin Broderick registered a fine point for the Galway men. Fergal Healy reduced the deficit even further when he deftly flicked the sliothar over the crossbar. Broderick added another point shortly afterwards to give the Galway fight back some momentum. Eugene Cloonan was able to tack on another point for Galway just before the break, leaving the Galway men trailing by 1-9 to 1-7 at the break. Galway were still in the game in spite of hitting nine wides over the opening thirty-five minutes.

Tipp got the first score of the second-half when Mark O’Leary exposed the Galway defence by dribbling the sliothar along the ground all the way to the net for his second goal. Eugene Cloonan responded when he converted a free but Tommy Dunne hit his second 65-metre free of the afternoon. This was followed by a fine point from Declan Ryan giving Tipp a lead of by 2-11 to 1-8. Kevin Broderick narrowed the deficit with his third point of the afternoon while Fergal Healy was most unlucky when his effort rebounded off the upright. Mark Kerins’s solitary point was book ended by two Lar Corbett points, however, Tipp still led by 2-12 to 1-10 with just over twenty minutes left in the game. Galway were under pressure again, however, Kerins answered the call with his second point of the day. Tipp nearly finished off the game soon afterwards; however, Declan Ryan’s goal chance went to the right of the post and wide. The Galway goalkeeper showed his heroics as he kept his side in the game after the Galway defence was breached again while up at the other end of the field Fergal Healy’s shot hit the upright for the second time.

Galway turned the tables on Tipp shortly after and put their defence under pressure. Kevin Broderick sent the sliothar over the bar for his fourth point of the afternoon before later registering his first wide of the game. With about ten minutes left in the game Tipperary were forced to make several changes to counteract the Galway dominance, however, Fergal Healy took full advantage of the changes when he burst through to score a goal from a seemingly impossible angle. Eoin Kelly subsequently pointed for the sixth time of the game to put his side two points ahead with eight minutes left. Mark O’Leary and Paddy O’Brien increased Tipperary’s lead when they both scored two more points for the Munster champions. Kevin Broderick pointed again for his team and scored a late goal, however, this was disallowed as the referee had sounded his whistle for an off-the-ball offence and Tipp escaped with a free out. Tommy Dunne’s third 65-metre free sailed over the crossbar and put four points between the sides again but Fergal Healy clawed one back for Galway soon afterwards. Eoin Kelly made it 2-18 to 2-14 a minute from the long whistle while Eugene Cloonan pointed from a free deep into injury time. That was the final score of the match and Tipperary went on to capture a 2-18 to 2-15 victory.

== Match details ==
2001-09-09
15:30 UTC+1

Tipperary	2-18 – 2-15	Galway
M. O'Leary (2-1); E. Kelly (0-7); T. Dunne (0-5); L. Corbett (0-2); J. Carroll (0-1); D. Ryan (0-1); P. O'Brien (0-1)	Report	E. Cloonan (1-5); F. Healy (1-2); K. Broderick (0-5); M. Kerins (0-2); J. Rabbitte (0-1)

Croke Park, Dublin
Attendance: 68,515
Referee: Pat O'Connor (Limerick)

TIPPERARY:
GK	1	Brendan Cummins
RCB	2	Thomas Costello
FB	3	Philip Maher
LCB	4	Paul Ormonde
RWB	5	Éamonn Corcoran
CB	6	David Kennedy
LWB	7	Paul Kelly
M	8	Eddie Enright
M	9	Tommy Dunne (c)
RWF	10	Mark O'Leary
CF	11	John Carroll
LWF	12	Eoin Kelly
RCF	13	Eugene O'Neill
FF	14	Declan Ryan
LCF	15	Lar Corbett
Substitutes:
LCB		Donnacha Fahy for T. Costello (56 mins)
RCF		Paddy O'Brien for E O'Neill (58 mins)
LWB		Micheál Ryan for P Kelly (67 mins)
CB		Conor Gleeson for D Kennedy (68 mins)

GALWAY:
GK	1	Michael Crimmins
RCB	2	Greg Kennedy
FB	3	Michael Healy
LCB	4	Ollie Canning
RWB	5	Derek Hardiman
CB	6	Liam Hodgins (c)
LWB	7	Cathal Moore
M	8	David Tierney
M	9	Richie Murray
RWF	10	Kevin Broderick
CF	11	Mark Kerins
LWF	12	Joe Rabbitte
RCF	13	Alan Kerins
FF	14	Eugene Cloonan
LCF	15	Fergal Healy
Substitutes:
RWB		Brian Higgins for D. Hardiman (48 mins)
LWF		Ollie Fahy for J. Rabbitte (65 mins)

MATCH RULES

- 70 minutes.
- Replay if scores level.
- Five substitutes allowed

== Paths to the final ==
=== Tipperary ===
MSHC Semi-final: Tipperary 0-15 – 0-14 Clare

MSHC Final: Tipperary 2-16 – 1-17 Limerick

AISHC Semi-final: Tipperary 1-16 – 3-10 Wexford

Replay: Tipperary 3-12 – 0-10 Wexford

=== Galway ===
AISHC Quarter-final: Galway 4-23 – 1-11 Derry

AISHC Semi-final: Galway 2-15 – 1-13 Kilkenny
