= List of Galway senior hurling team captains =

This article lists players who have captained the Galway county hurling team in the All-Ireland Senior Hurling Championship. Unlike other counties the captain is not chosen from the club that has won the Galway Senior Hurling Championship.

== List of captains ==
Year	Player	Club	All-Ireland Honours	Provincial Honours / Walsh Cup
2016	David Burke	St Thomas	All Ireland winning captain	Leinster Hurling final winning captain
2015	David Collins	Liam Mellows		Walsh Cup winning captain
2014	Joe Canning	Portumna		
2013	Fergal Moore	Turloughmore		
2012	Fergal Moore	Turloughmore		Leinster Hurling Final winning captain
2011	Damien Joyce	Cappataggle		
2010	Shane Kavanagh	Kinvara		Walsh Cup winning captain
2009	Ollie Canning	Portumna		
2008	Ollie Canning	Portumna		
2007	David Collins	Liam Mellows		
2006	Liam Donoghue	Clarinbridge		
2005	Liam Donoghue	Clarinbridge		
2004	Ollie Canning	Portumna		
2003	Liam Hodgins	Tynagh-Abbey-Duniry		
2002	Liam Hodgins	Tynagh-Abbey-Duniry		
2001	Liam Hodgins	Tynagh-Abbey-Duniry		
2000	Joe Rabbitte	Athenry		
1999	Cathal Moore	Turloughmore		Connacht Hurling Final winning captain
1998	Brian Feeney	Athenry		Connacht Hurling Final winning captain
1997				Connacht Hurling Final winning captain
1996	Michael Coleman	Abbeyknockmoy		Connacht Hurling Final winning captain
1995	Seán Treacy	Portumna		Connacht Hurling Final winning captain
1994	Gerry McInerney	Kinvara		
1993	Michael McGrath	Sarsfield's		
1992	Michael Coleman	Abbeyknockmoy		
1991	Pete Finnerty	Mullagh		
1990	Joe Cooney	Sarsfield's		
1989	Conor Hayes	Kiltormer		
1988	Conor Hayes	Kiltormer	All-Ireland Hurling Final winning captain	
1987	Conor Hayes	Kiltormer	All-Ireland Hurling Final winning captain	
1986	Noel Lane	Ballinderreen		
1985	Michael Connolly	Castlegar		
1984	P. J. Molloy	Athenry		
1983				
1982				
1981	Seán Silke	Meelick-Eyrecourt		
1980	Joe Connolly	Castlegar	All-Ireland Hurling Final winning captain	
1979	Joe McDonagh	Ballinderreen		
1978	Frank Burke	Turloughmore		
1977	Iggy Clarke	Mullagh		
1976	Iggy Clarke	Mullagh		
1975	John Connolly	Castlegar		
1928	Jim Power	Tynagh		
1918	Jim Power	Tynagh		

=== 2010-present ===
Year	Captain	Club	National	Provincial
2010	Shane Kavanagh	Kinvara		
2011	Damien Joyce	Cappaaggle		
2012	Fergal Moore	Turloughmore		Leinster Hurling Final winning captain
2013	Fergal Moore	Turloughmore		
2014	Fergal Moore	Turloughmore		
2015	David Collins	Liam Mellows		
