= David Hoey =

David Hoey may refer to:

- David Hoey (hurler)
- David Hoey (window dresser)
