= 2006 All-Ireland Senior Hurling Championship =

Championship details
- Dates: 14 May – 3 September 2006
- Teams: 12

All-Ireland champions
- Winning team: Kilkenny (29th win)
- Captain: Jackie Tyrrell
- Manager: Brian Cody

All-Ireland Finalists
- Losing team: Cork
- Captain: Pat Mulcahy
- Manager: John Allen

Provincial champions
- Munster: Cork
- Leinster: Kilkenny
- Ulster: Antrim
- Connacht: Not Played

Championship statistics
- No. matches played: 29
- Top Scorer: Henry Shefflin (2–47)
- Player of the Year: Henry Shefflin
- All-Star Team: See here

The 2006 All-Ireland Senior Hurling Championship was the 120th staging of the All-Ireland Senior Hurling Championship, the Gaelic Athletic Association's premier inter-county hurling tournament, since its establishment in 1887. The draw for the provincial fixtures took place on 12 November 2005. The championship began on 14 May 2006 and ended on 3 September 2006

Cork entered the championship as defending champions.

On 3 September 2006, Kilkenny won the championship after a 1–16 to 1–13 defeat of Cork in the All-Ireland final at Croke Park. This was their 29th All-Ireland title overall and their first title since 2003.

Kilkenny's Henry Shefflin was the championship's top scorer with 2–47.

== Team changes ==
=== To Championship ===
Promoted from the Christy Ring Cup

- Westmeath

=== From Championship ===
Relegated to the Christy Ring Cup

- Antrim

== Teams ==
=== General information ===
Twelve counties will compete in the All-Ireland Senior Hurling Championship: one team in the Connacht Senior Hurling Championship, six teams in the Leinster Senior Hurling Championship and five teams in the Munster Senior Hurling Championship.

County	Last provincial title	Last championship title	Position in 2005 Championship	Appearance
Clare	1998	1997	Semi-finals	
Cork	2005	2005	Champions	
Dublin	1961	1938	Qualifier Group B	
Galway	1999	1988	Runners-up	
Kilkenny	2005	2003	Semi-finals	
Laois	1949	1915	Qualifier Group A	
Limerick	1996	1973	Quarter-finals	
Offaly	1995	1998	Qualifier Group B	
Tipperary	2001	2001	Quarter-finals	
Waterford	2004	1959	Quarter-finals	
Westmeath	—	—	Champions (Christy Ring Cup)	
Wexford	2004	1996	Quarter-finals	

=== Overview ===
Twelve teams participated in hurling's top tier in 2006.

For the first time since 1983, the Ulster champions were not represented in the wider All-Ireland series of games. Antrim, in spite of being Ulster champions in 2005, subsequently lost all of their All-Ireland qualifier games and were relegated to the Christy Ring Cup after being beaten by Offaly and Laois in the relegation play-offs.

=== Personnel and general information ===
Team	Colours	Manager(s)	Captain(s)	Sponsor
Clare		Anthony Daly	Seánie McMahon	Pat O'Donnell
Cork		John Allen	Pat Mulcahy	O2
Dublin		Tommy Naughton	Philip Brennan	Arnotts
Galway		Liam Donoghue	Conor Hayes	Supermacs
Kilkenny		Brian Cody	Jackie Tyrrell	Avonmore
Laois		Dinny Cahill	Patrick Mullaney	The Heritage
Limerick		Joe McKenna; Richie Bennis	T. J. Ryan; Damien Reale	Sporting Limerick
Offaly		John McIntyre	Brendan Murphy	Carroll Cuisine
Tipperary		Babs Keating	Ger O'Grady	Enfer
Waterford		Justin McCarthy	Paul Flynn	Essence
Westmeath		Séamus Qualter	John Shaw	Greville Arms Hotel
Wexford		Séamus Murphy	Keith Rossiter	Wexford Cheddar

== Provincial championships ==
=== Leinster Senior Hurling Championship ===
Quarter-finals
Laois	0–08
Offaly	2–12
Westmeath	0–13
Dublin	0–11

Semi-finals
Wexford	0–09
Offaly	0–08
Westmeath	1–09
Kilkenny	1–23

Leinster final
Wexford	2–12
Kilkenny	1–23

==== Quarter-finals ====
21 May 2006 Quarter-final	Laois	0–08 – 2–12	Offaly	O'Moore Park
14:00	J Young 0–4 (0–4 frees); S Lowry, J Phelan, D Cuddy, Z Keenan, 0–1 each.	Report	B Carroll 0–5 (0–4 frees); J Bergin 1–1; A Hanrahan 1–1; G Hanniffy, M O’Hara, B Murphy, D Hayden, A Egan, 0–1 each.	Referee: F Smith (Meath)

21 May 2006 Quarter-final	Westmeath	0–13 – 0–11	Dublin	O'Moore Park
16:00	A. Mitchell 0–8 (0–7 frees, 0–1 65); D. McNicholas 0–2; B. Kennedy, B. Murtagh, D. Carty, 0–1 each.	Report	D. Curtin 0–7 (0–7 frees); M. Carton, J. McCaffrey, D. Sweeney, L. Ryan, 0–1 each.	Referee: J Ryan (Tipperary)

==== Semi-finals ====
10 June 2006 Semi-final	Westmeath	1–09 – 1–23	Kilkenny	Cusack Park
19:00	A. Mitchell 0–5 (0–3 frees, 0–2 65’s); B. Kennedy 1–0; E. Loughlin, B. Connaughton, J. Clarke, D. McCormack, 0–1 each.	Report	H. Shefflin 0–8 (0–4 frees); E. McCormack 1–3; M. Comerford 0–3; M. Rice 0–3; J. Fitzpatrick 0–2; R. Mullally 0–2; D. Lyng, W. O’Dwyer, 0–1 each.	Attendance: 6,891; Referee: J Sexton (Cork)

11 June 2006 Semi-final	Wexford	0–09 – 0–08	Offaly	Nowlan Park
15:30	S. Doyle 0–3; R. Jacob 0–3; D. Ruth 0–2 (free, 65); PJ Nolan 0–1.	Report	B. Carroll 0–3 (0–1 free); D. Hayden, J. Bergin, A. Egan, P. Cleary (free), M. Cordial, 0–1 each.	Attendance: 15,720; Referee: P O'Connor (Limerick)

==== Final ====
2 July 2006 Final	Kilkenny	1–23 – 2–12	Wexford	Croke Park
16:00	H. Shefflin 1–7 (0–5 frees); M. Comerford 0–4; R. Power 0–3; E. Brennan and J. Fitzpatrick 0–2 each; R. Mullally, D. Lyng, J. Tyrrell, M. Rice and M. Fennelly 0–1 each.	Report	M. Jacob 1–4; R. Jacob 1–2; S. Doyle 0–3 frees; E. Quigley, D. Ruth (free) and D. Fitzhenry (penalty) 0–1 each.	Attendance: 44,081; Referee: D Kirwan (Cork)

=== Munster Senior Hurling Championship ===
Quarter-finals
Tipperary	0–22
Limerick	2–12

Semi-finals
Cork	0–20
Clare	0–14
Waterford	1–12
Tipperary	3–14

Munster final
Cork	2–14
Tipperary	1–14

==== Quarter-final ====
14 May 2006 Quarter-final	Tipperary	0–22 – 2–12	Limerick	Semple Stadium
14:00	E. Kelly 0–14 (0–4 frees, 0–1 65); J. O’Brien 0–2; K. Dunne 0–2; M. Webster, G. O’Grady, J. Carroll, D. Egan, 0–1 each.	Report	M. Keane 0–5 (all frees); B. Begley 1–1; A. O’Shaughnessy 1–1; S. Lucey 0–2; B. Foley 0–2 (frees); C. Fitzgerald 0–1.	Attendance: 26,494; Referee: M Haverty (Galway)

==== Semi-finals ====
28 May 2006 Semi-final	Cork	0–20 – 0–14	Clare	Semple Stadium
16:00	J. Deane 0–9 (0–6 frees); J. O’Connor 0–4 (0–1 free, 0–1 ‘65); B. Corcoran and T. Kenny 0–2 each; N. McCarthy, R. Curran and N. Ronan 0–1 each.	Report	N. Gilligan 0–6 frees; T. Carmody 0–3; B. Nugent 0–2; D. O’Connell 0–2; A. Markham 0–1.	Attendance: 40,349; Referee: B Kelly (Westmeath)

4 June 2006 Semi-final	Tipperary	3–14 – 1–12	Waterford	Páirc Uí Chaoimh
14:00	E. Kelly 2–9 (0–4 frees, 0–2 ‘65’s); L. Corbett 1–0; J. O’Brien 0–2; J. Carroll, G. O’Grady and M. Webster 0–1 each.	Report	P. Flynn 0–5 (0–4 frees); D. Shanahan 1–0; K. McGrath 0–3; E. McGrath, J. Kennedy, D. Bennett (free) and J. Mullane 0–1 each.	Attendance: 27,680; Referee: J Sexton (Cork)

==== Final ====
25 June 2006 Final	Cork	2–14 – 1–14	Tipperary	Semple Stadium
16:00	J. Deane 0–8 (0–5 frees); B. O’Connor and B. Corcoran 1–1 each; J. Gardiner 0–2 (0–1 free); J. O’Connor and K. Murphy 0–1 each.	Report	E. Kelly 0–7 (0–4 frees, 0–2 (‘65’s); L. Corbett 1–1; J. O’Brien and J. Carroll 0–2 each; P. Kelly and B. Dunne 0–1 each.	Attendance: 53,286; Referee: D Murphy (Wexford)

=== Ulster Senior Hurling Championship ===
Quarter-finals
Antrim	2–16
London	1–14

Semi-finals
New York	1–18
Derry	1–12
Down	0–12
Antrim	2–23

Final
New York	1–14
Antrim	2–20

==== Quarter-finals ====
Quarter-final	Antrim	2–16 – 1–14	London

==== Semi-finals ====
Semi-final	New York	1–18 – 1–12	Derry

Semi-final	Antrim	2–23 – 0–12	Down

==== Final ====
Final	Antrim	2–20 – 1–14	New York

== Cup competitions ==
=== Christy Ring Cup (2nd tier) ===
==== Group A ====
Pos	Team	Pld	W	D	L	SF	SA	Diff	Pts	Qualification
1	Down	4	4	0	0	8–76	2–43	51	8	Advance to Knockout Stage
2	Antrim	4	3	0	1	15–70	2–48	61	6	Advance to Knockout Stage
3	London	4	2	0	2	7–45	4–59	−5	4	
4	Meath	4	1	0	3	2–65	10–50	−9	2	
5	Roscommon	4	0	0	4	2–35	16–91	−98	0	Advance to relegation playoff

==== Group B ====
Pos	Team	Pld	W	D	L	SF	SA	Diff	Pts	Qualification
1	Kildare	4	4	0	0	9–62	7–43	25	8	Advance to Knockout Stage
2	Carlow	4	2	1	1	7–55	8–37	15	5	Advance to Knockout Stage
3	Mayo	4	2	0	2	4–34	7–48	−23	4	
4	Wicklow	4	1	1	2	6–45	9–41	−5	3	
5	Kerry	4	0	0	4	7–34	2–61	−12	0	Advance to relegation playoff

==== Knockout stage ====
Semi-Finals
Kildare	0–06
Antrim	2–21
Down	5–08
Carlow	2–19

Final
Antrim	5–13
Carlow	1–07

=== Nicky Rackard Cup (3rd tier) ===
==== Group A ====
Pos	Team	Pld	W	D	L	SF	SA	Diff	Pts	Qualification
1	Donegal	3	2	1	0	8–43	2–33	+28	5	Advance to Knockout stage
2	Sligo	3	2	1	0	7–43	7–20	+23	5	Advance to Knockout stage
3	Fermanagh	3	1	0	2	7–31	6–48	−14	2	
4	Tyrone	3	0	0	3	3–33	10–49	−37	0	

==== Group B ====
Pos	Team	Pld	W	D	L	SF	SA	Diff	Pts	Qualification
1	Armagh	3	3	0	0	11–65	2–18	+74	5	Advance to Knockout stage
2	Louth	3	2	0	1	12–44	3–28	+43	5	Advance to Knockout stage
3	Leitrim	3	1	0	2	6–32	10–37	−17	2	
4	Cavan	3	0	0	3	5–10	19–58	−90	0	

==== Group C ====
Pos	Team	Pld	W	D	L	SF	SA	Diff	Pts	Qualification
1	Derry	3	3	0	0	8–54	3–35	+34	6	Advance to Knockout stage
2	Longford	3	2	0	1	3–44	3–31	+13	4	Advance to Knockout stage
3	Warwickshire	3	1	0	2	4–29	4–44	−15	2	
4	Monaghan	3	0	0	3	1–31	6–48	−32	0	

==== Knockout stage ====
Quarter-final playoffs
Louth	1–18
Sligo	1–13

Quarter-finals
Longford	1–19
Louth	2–07

Semi-finals
Derry	3–10
Armagh	0–10
Donegal	1–19
Longford	0–10

Final
Derry	5–15
Donegal	1–11

== All-Ireland qualifiers ==
=== Group A ===
Pos	Team	Pld	W	D	L	F	A	Diff	Pts	Qualification
1	Waterford	3	3	0	0	6–64	4–47	23	6	Advance to All-Ireland Quarter-Finals
2	Galway	3	2	0	1	12–59	3–44	42	4	Advance to All-Ireland Quarter-Finals
3	Laois	3	1	0	2	5–41	11–44	−21	2	
4	Westmeath	3	0	0	3	3–29	8–58	−44	0	Advance to Relegation Playoff

==== Results ====
17 June 2006 Round 1	Laois	2–13 – 7–18	Galway	O'Moore Park
19:00	M. Rooney 2–1; J. Young 0–8 (0–5 frees); J. Fitzpatrick 0–2 (0–1 sideline); J. Phelan, Z. Keenan (free), 0–1 each.	Report	A. Kerins 4–2; R. Murray 2–1; D. Hayes 1–2; G. Farragher 0–4 (0–1 free, 0–1 65); F. Healy 0–3; A. Keary 0–2; C. Connolly 0–2; D. Forde, K. Burke, 0–1 each.	Attendance: 1,500; Referee: B White (Tipperary)

18 June 2006 Round 1	Westmeath	1–14 – 3–22	Waterford	Cusack Park
16:00	J. Shaw (0–5, 0–2 f) B. Murtagh (1–1); D. Carty (0–3); A. Mitchell(0–2, f); E. Loughlin, B. Kennedy and D. McNicholas (0–1 each).	Report	D. Bennett (0–7, 0–5 f)); K. McGrath (1–3, 1–1 f)); J. Mullane (1–2); D. Shanahan (1–2); S. O’Sullivan (0–3); E. McGrath (0–2); T. Browne, M. Walsh and J. Kennedy (0–1 each).	Referee: É Morris (Dublin)

1 July 2006 Round 2	Westmeath	2–09 – 2–15	Laois	Cusack Park
19:00	A Mitchell 0–7 (frees), D McNicholas 1–1, D McCormack 1–0, B Kennedy 0–1.		J Young 1–13 (1–8 frees, 1 '65)), M Rooney 1–1, M McEvoy 0–1.	Referee: J O'Mahony (Limerick)

2 July 2006 Round 2	Waterford	1–25 – 2–20	Galway	Walsh Park
14:00	D Bennett (0–7, 0–6 frees); E Kelly (0–4); J Mullane (0–4); K McGrath (0–4, 0–3 65s); P Flynn (1–0, f); M Walsh (0- 2); D Shanahan (0–2); S O’Sullivan, T Browne (0–1) each.	Report	D Hayes (1–4); G Farragher (0–7, 0–5 f); D Forde (0–3); C Connolly (1–0); F Healy (0–2); A Kerins, A Keary, D Hardiman, N Healy (0–1) each.	Attendance: 11,000; Referee: S McMahon (Clare)

8 July 2006 Round 3	Laois	1–13 – 2–17	Waterford	O'Moore Park
14:45	J. Young(0–8, 0–6 frees); D. Culliton()1–0); J. Fitzpatrick(0–2); J. Phelan(0–2); S. Dollard(0–1).	Report	M. Walsh(1–5); J. Mullane(1–3); D. Bennett(0–6, 0- 4 free s); E. McGrath(0–1); K. McGrath(0–1, "65); S. Prendergast(0–1).	Attendance: 9,250; Referee: É Morris (Dublin)

8 July 2006 Round 3	Galway	3–21 – 0–06	Westmeath	Pearse Stadium
19:00	G Farragher 1–6 (1-5f), D Hayes 1–3, D Forde 1–2, N Healy, C Connolly 0–2 each, C Dervan, K Wade, K Broderick, F Healy, D Tierney, E Lynch 0–1 each.		A Mitchell 0–3 (f), B Smyth 0–2, B Murtagh 0–1.	Attendance: 1,500

=== Group B ===
Pos	Team	Pld	W	D	L	F	A	Diff	Pts	Status
1	Clare	3	3	0	0	8–57	2–35	40	6	Advance to All-Ireland Quarter-Finals
2	Limerick	3	2	0	1	4–55	5–53	−1	4	Advance to All-Ireland Quarter-Finals
3	Offaly	3	1	0	2	4–45	4–61	−16	2	
4	Dublin	3	0	0	3	2–46	7–54	−23	0	Advance to Relegation Playoff

==== Results ====
17 June 2006 Round 1	Dublin	0–17 – 1–17	Offaly	Parnell Park
19:00	D Curtin 0–8 (0-5f, 1 '65), A McCrabbe 0–4, S McDonnell 0–2, K Flynn, J McCaffrey, L Ryan 0–1 each.		B Carroll 0–6, B Whelehan 1–2 (0-2f), G Hanniffy 0–3, D Hayden, D Hoctor 0–2 each, E Bevans, D Tanner 0–1 each.	Attendance: 7,000; Referee: J Kelly

18 June 2006 Round 1	Clare	2–21 – 0–10	Limerick	Cusack Park
16:00	T. Griffin 1–5; D. O’Rourke 1–3; N. Gilligan 0–4 (0–1 free); J. Clancy 0–3; B. Nugent 0–2; F. Lynch, D. Quinn (free), B. O’Connell, A. Markham, 0–1 each.	Report	M. Keane 0–4 (0–4 frees); B. Foley 0–2 (0–2 frees); M. O’Brien, M. Foley (65), N. Moran, W. Walsh, 0–1 each.	Referee: S Roche (Tipperary)

1 July 2006 Round 2	Dublin	1–16 – 4–21	Clare	Parnell Park
16:00	L Ryan 1–2, D Curtin 0–5 (f), J McCaffrey, K Dunne, D Sweeney 0–2 each, K O'Reilly, K Flynn, S McDonnell 0–1 each.		N Gilligan 2–5 (5f), A Markham 2–1, S McMahon 0–4 (3f, 1 '65), T Griffin, T Carmody 0–3 each, D McMahon 0–2, C Lynch, J Clancy, B Nugent 0–1 each.	Referee: T McIntyre (Antrim)

1 July 2006 Round 2	Offaly	2–19 – 2–29	Limerick	O'Connor Park
19:00	J. Bergin 2–1 (1–0 free); B. Carroll 0–7 (0–6 frees); D. Hoctor 0–3; G. Hanniffy 0–2; B. Murphy 0–2; P. Cleary (free), K. Brady (65), D. Tanner, B. Whelehan, 0–1 each.	Report	B. Foley 1–7 (0–3 frees 0–1 65); A. O’Shaughnessy 0–7 (0–3 frees); B. Begley 0–5; N. Moran 0–4; M. Foley 0–3 (frees); D. Ryan 1–0; M. O’Brien 0–2; C. Fitzgerald 0–1.	Referee: M Haverty (Galway)

8 July 2006 Round 3	Clare	2–15 – 1–09	Offaly	Cusack Park
19:30	D Quinn 1–7 (0–4 frees, 0–1 ‘65); T Carmody 1–2; T Griffin and N Gilligan 0–2 each; C Lynch and S McMahon (free), 0–1 each.	Report	J Bergin 1–3 (0–2 frees); B Carroll 0–3; J Brady, D Hayden and P Cleary 0–1 each.	Attendance: 6,519; Referee: J Ryan (Tipperary)

8 July 2006 Round 3	Limerick	2–16 – 1–13	Dublin	Gaelic Grounds
19:30	B Begley 2–2, A O'Shaughnessy 0–4 (f), B Foley 0–4 (2f), N Moran, C Fitzgerald 0–2 each, D Ryan, P O'Dwyer 0–1 each.		D Curtin 0–6 (4f), L Ryan 0–5, K Flynn 1–0, S Mullen, P O'Driscoll 0–1 each.	Attendance: 5,000; Referee: M Wadding (Waterford)

=== Relegation play-off ===
15 July 2006 Relegation play-off	Dublin	0–16 – 0–08	Westmeath	O'Connor Park
	D Curtin 0–8 (5f), S McDonnell, J McCaffrey 0–2 each, M Carton, J Kelly, K Flynn, P Carton 0–1 each.	Report	A Mitchell 0–5 (5f), D Mc Nicholas 0–2, B Murtagh 0–1.	Referee: D Kirwan (Cork)

== All-Ireland Senior Hurling Championship ==
=== Bracket ===
Quarter-finals
Cork	0–19
Limerick	0–18
Waterford	1–22
Tipperary	3–13
Kilkenny	2–22
Galway	3–14
Clare	1–27
Wexford	1–15

Semi-finals
Cork	1–16
Waterford	1–15
Kilkenny	2–21
Clare	1–16

Final
Cork	1–13
Kilkenny	1–16

=== All-Ireland quarter-finals ===
22 July 2006 Quarter-final	Cork	0–19 – 0–18	Limerick	Semple Stadium
16:00	B. O’Connor (0–2 frees) and J. Deane (0–4 frees) 0–5 each; N. Ronan 0–3; T. Kenny and N. McCarthy 0–2 each; B. Corcoran and J. O’Connor 0–1 each.	Report	A. O’Shaughnessy 0–5 (0–4 frees); N. Moran 0–4; C. Fitzgerald, M. O’Brien and P. Tobin 0–2 each; T.J. Ryan, M. Foley (free) and M. Keane 0–1 each.	Attendance: 34,202; Referee: E Morris (Dublin)

22 July 2006 Quarter-final	Kilkenny	2–22 – 3–14	Galway	Semple Stadium
18:00	H. Shefflin 0–11 (0–5 frees, 0–2 65’s); J. ‘Cha’ Fitzpatrick 1–2; E. Larkin 0–4; M. Comerford 0–3; A. Fogarty 1–0; E. Brennan 0–1, D. Lyng 0–1 each.	Report	G. Farragher 0–5 (0–3 frees); D. Tierney 1–2; N. Healy 1–1; E. Cloonan 1–0 (pen.); A. Kerins 0–2; D. Hayes 0–2; C. Dervan (65), R. Murray, 0–1 each.	Attendance: 34,202; Referee: D Kirwan (Cork)

23 July 2006 Quarter-final	Clare	1–27 – 1–15	Wexford	Croke Park
14:15	N. Gilligan 0–6 (0–2 frees); T. Carmody (0–5); T. Griffin 0–4; D. McMahon 1–1; A. Markham 0–3; S. McMahon 0–3 (frees); D. O’Connell 0–2; F. Lynch, B. Nugent, D. Quinn, 0–1 each.	Report	R. McCarthy 1–1; R. Jacob 0–3; S. Doyle 0–3 (all frees); P. Codd 0–3 (all frees); D. Mythen 0–2; M. Jacob, E. Quigley, D. Ruth (free), 0–1 each.	Attendance: 45,928; Referee: M Haverty (Galway)

23 July 2006 Quarter-final	Waterford	1–22 – 3–13	Tipperary	Croke Park
16:00	D. Shanahan 1–5; D. Bennett 0–6 frees; E. McGrath, P. Flynn (0–2 frees) and J. Mullane 0–3 each; K. McGrath (free) and M. Walsh 0–1 each.	Report	E. Kelly 1–8 (1–3 frees, 0–2 65’s); J. Carroll 2–0; L. Corbett 0–2; P. Kelly, J. O’Brien and W. Ryan 0–1 each.	Attendance: 45,928; Referee: B Kelly (Westmeath)

=== All-Ireland semi-finals ===
6 August 2006 Semi-final	Cork	1–16 – 1–15	Waterford	Croke Park
16:00	C Naughton (1-01), J Deane (0-04 (4f)), T McCarthy (0-03), N Ronan (0-03), B Corcoran (0-02), J O'Connor (0-02), T Kenny (0-01).	Report	E Kelly (1-06 (6f)), J Mullane (0-04), K McGrath (0-02 (2f)), D Shanahan (0-01), S Prendergast (0-01), E McGrath (0-01).	Attendance: 61,753; Referee: B Gavin (Offaly)

13 August 2006 Semi-final	Kilkenny	2–21 – 1–16	Clare	Croke Park
16:00	H Shefflin 1–13 (5fr, 1 '65, 1 pen), E McCormack 1–0, M Comerford, E Larkin 0–2 each, J Fitzpatrick, D Lyng, R Power, E Brennan 0–1 each.	Report	N Gilligan 1–3 (2fr), S McMahon 0–5, T Griffin 0–4, T Carmody 0–2, D McMahon, D Quinn 0–1 each.	Attendance: 70,978; Referee: S Roche (Tipperary)

=== All-Ireland Final ===
3 September 2006 Final	Kilkenny	1–16 – 1–13	Cork	Croke Park
15:30	H. Shefflin 0–8 (0–5 frees); A. Fogarty 1–3; M. Comerford, D. Lyng, J. Fitzpatrick, R. Power and E. Brennan 0–1 each.	Report	B. O’Connor 1–4 (0–1 free); J. Deane 0–6 (0–5 frees); N. McCarthy, J. O’Connor and J. Gardiner 0–1 each.	Attendance: 82,275; Referee: B Kelly (Westmeath)

== Championship statistics ==
=== Top scorers ===
==== Overall ====
Rank	Player	County	Tally	Total	Matches	Average
1	Henry Shefflin	Kilkenny	2–47	53	5	10.60
2	Eoin Kelly	Tipperary	3–38	47	4	11.75
3	James Young	Laois	1–33	36	4	9.00
4	Niall Gilligan	Clare	3–26	35	6	5.83
5	David Curtin	Dublin	0–34	34	5	6.80
6	Joe Deane	Cork	0–32	32	5	6.40
7	Andrew Mitchell	Westmeath	0–30	30	6	5.00
8	Dave Bennett	Waterford	0–27	27	5	5.40
9	Ger Farragher	Galway	1–22	25	4	6.25
10	Brian Carroll	Offaly	0–24	24	5	4.80

==== In a single game ====
Rank	Player	County	Tally	Total	Opposition
1	Henry Shefflin	Kilkenny	1–13	16	Clare
1	James Young	Laois	1–13	16	Westmeath
2	Eoin Kelly	Tipperary	2-09	15	Waterford
3	Alan Kerins	Galway	4-02	14	Laois
3	Eoin Kelly	Tipperary	0–14	14	Limerick
4	Niall Gilligan	Clare	2-05	11	Dublin
4	Henry Shefflin	Kilkenny	0–11	11	Galway
5	Derek Quinn	Clare	1-07	10	Offaly
5	Barry Foley	Limerick	1-07	10	Offaly
5	Henry Shefflin	Kilkenny	1-07	10	Wexford

== Miscellaneous ==
- For the first time since 1983, the Ulster champions were not represented in the wider All-Ireland series of games.

== See also ==
- 2006 Ulster Senior Hurling Championship
- 2006 Christy Ring Cup (Tier 2)
- 2006 Nicky Rackard Cup (Tier 3)
