= 2006 Munster Senior Hurling Championship final =

- Event: 2006 Munster Senior Hurling Championship
Cork	Tipperary
2-14	1-14
- Date: 25 June 2006
- Venue: Semple Stadium, Thurles
- Referee: D Murphy (Wexford)
- Attendance: 53,286

The 2006 Munster Senior Hurling Championship final (sponsored by Guinness) was a hurling match played on Sunday 25 June 2006 at Semple Stadium, Thurles, County Tipperary,. It was contested by Cork and Tipperary. Cork, captained by Pat Mulcahy, claimed the title, beating Tipperary on a scoreline of 2-14 to 1-14. The match was shown live in Ireland as part of The Sunday Game Live on RTÉ Two.

Tipperary forward Lar Corbett got the opening goal of the game when he shot low to beat Cork goalkeeper Donal Óg Cusack in the fourth minute. Cusack went on to make two saves in the first half as the teams were level at half time.

== Match ==
=== Ddetails ===
25 June 2006
16:00
Final

Cork	2-14 - 1-14	Tipperary
J. Deane 0-8 (0-5 frees); B. O'Connor and B. Corcoran 1-1 each; J. Gardiner 0-2 (0-1 free); J. O'Connor and K. Murphy 0-1 each.	Report	E. Kelly 0-7 (0-4 frees, 0-2 ('65's); L. Corbett 1-1; J. O'Brien and J. Carroll 0-2 each; P. Kelly and B. Dunne 0-1 each.

Semple Stadium
Attendance: 53,286
Referee: D Murphy (Wexford)
