= Séamus Roche =

Irish hurling referee and Gaelic footballer

- Full name: Séamus Roche
- Born: 8 September 1969 (age 57); Kilsheelan, County Tipperary, Ireland
- Other occupation: Sales rep

Séamus Roche (born 8 September 1969) is an Irish retired hurling referee. He is a former Gaelic footballer and hurler with his club Kilsheelan–Kilcash.

Roche was the referee for the 2005 All-Ireland Senior Hurling Championship Final between Cork and Galway and was a linesman for the 2003 and 2004 finals.

He retired from inter-county refereeing in 2011.

Achievements
Preceded by Aodán Mac Suibhne (Dublin)	All-Ireland Senior Hurling Final referee 2005	Succeeded by Barry Kelly (Westmeath)
