= Fergal Moore =

Galway hurler

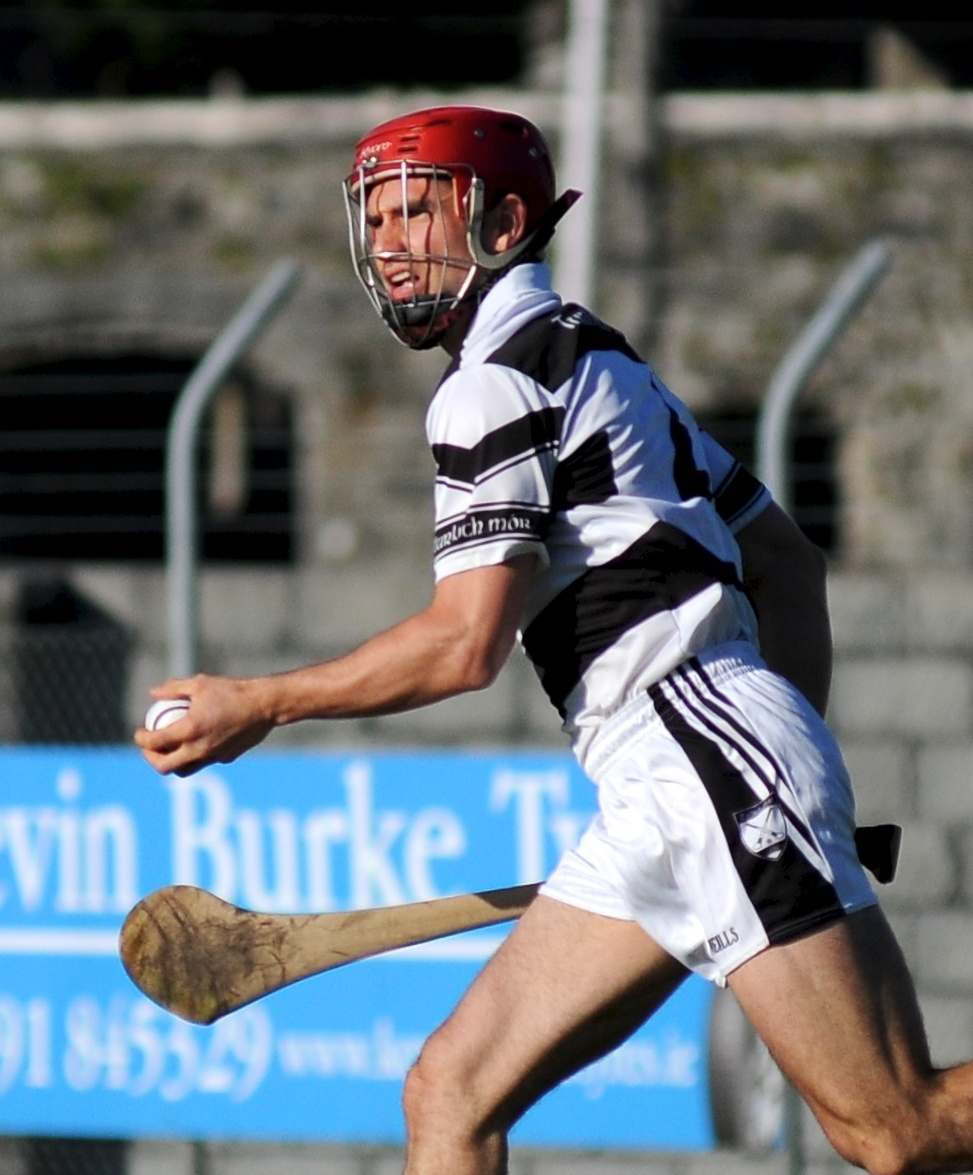
- Moore in 2013

Personal information
- Native name: Fergal Ó Mórdha (Irish)
- Born: 7 July 1982 (age 44) Galway, Ireland
- Height: 1.81 m (5 ft 11 in)

Sport
- Sport: Hurling
- Position: Left Corner Back
Club
- Years: Club
- 1999–: Turloughmore
Inter-county
Years	County	Apps (scores)
2004–2016	Galway	44 (0–3)
Inter-county titles
- Leinster titles: 1
- NHL: 1
- All Stars: 1

Fergal Moore (born 7 July 1982) is an Irish hurler who played as a right corner-back at senior level for the Galway county team.

A brother of former Galway hurler Cathal, Moore made his first appearance for the team during the 2004 National League and became a regular member of the starting fifteen over a few seasons. Since then he has won one Leinster winners' medal and one National League winners' medal.

At club level Moore plays with Turloughmore.

== Playing career ==
=== Club ===
Moore played his club hurling with Turloughmore. He enjoyed some success in the juvenile and underage grades, however, success at senior level has eluded him.

=== Inter-county ===
Moore first came to prominence on the inter-county scene as a member of the Galway minor hurling team in the late nineties. It was a successful era for the county's minors, with Moore collecting an All-Ireland medal following a 0–13 to 0–10 defeat of Tipperary in 1999.

The following year, Moore was still a key member of the Galway minors, and he collected a second All-Ireland medal following a 2–19 to 4–10 defeat of Cork.

By 2002 Moore had joined the Galway under-21 team and he lined out in yet another All-Ireland final. Limerick provided the opposition, however, in spite of being marginal favourites Galway were trounced by 3–17 to 0–8.

Moore was appointed captain of the Galway under-21 team in 2003 as he lined out in a second successive All-Ireland final in that grade. Kilkenny were the winners on that occasion by 2–13 to 0–12.

In 2004, Moore made his debut with the Galway senior hurling team. He won a National Hurling League medal that year after a 2–15 to 1–13 defeat of Waterford in the final. He made his championship debut later that year in an All-Ireland qualifier against Down. Since then he has been a regular with Galway, however, his career has been hampered through injury.

In 2012 Moore was appointed captain of the Galway senior hurling team. He later guided the team to their first Leinster title following a 2–21 to 2–11 trouncing of reigning All-Ireland champions and hot favourites Kilkenny. Both sides subsequently met in the All-Ireland decider and Galway nearly pulled off a victory courtesy of goals from Joe Canning and Niall Burke. A 2–13 to 0–19 draw was the result, a first drawn All-Ireland final in over half a century. Defeat to Kilkenny followed for Moore and his Galway team in the replay. Moore's outstanding performances in the 2012 Championship earned him his first All Star Award in October 2012.

=== Inter-provincial ===
Moore has also lined out with Connacht in the inter-provincial series of games. He won an Interprovincial Championship medal in 2004 following a 1–15 to 0–9 defeat of Munster.

Sporting positions
Preceded by Damien Joyce	Galway Senior Hurling Captain; 2012–2013	Succeeded by Joe Canning
