= David Collins (hurler) =

Irish hurler (born 1984)

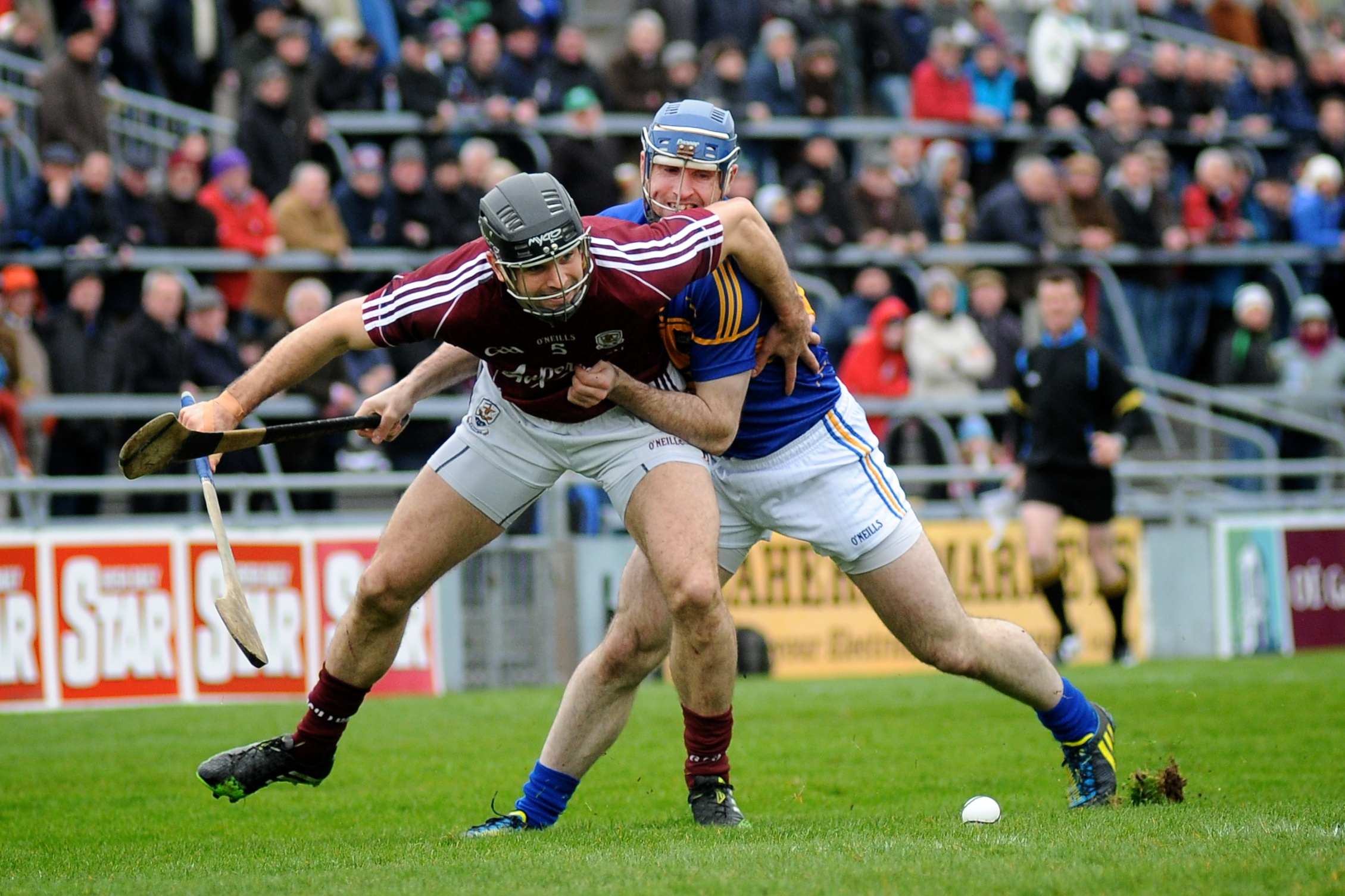
- David Collins of Galway (left) holds off Tipperary's Eoin Kelly (right) in the 2014 National Hurling League

Personal information
- Native name: Daithí Ó Coileáin (Irish)
- Nickname: Davy
- Born: 17 March 1984 (age 42) Galway, Ireland
- Height: 6 ft 1 in (185 cm)

Sport
- Sport: Hurling
- Position: Right half back
Club
- Years: Club
- Liam Mellows
Club titles
- Galway titles: 1
Inter-county*
Years	County	Apps (scores)
2004–2016	Galway	46 (0-04)
Inter-county titles
- Leinster titles: 1
- All-Irelands: 0
- NHL: 2
- All Stars: 1
- *Inter County team apps and scores correct as of 15:52, 22 August 2012.

David Collins (born 17 March 1984) is an Irish hurler who currently plays as a right corner-back for the Galway senior team. He joined the team in 2004 and has been a regular member until 2016.

An All-Ireland medalist in the under-21 grade, Collins has been a stalwart on the Galway team for almost a decade. He has won one Leinster winners' medal, two National Hurling League winners' medals and one Vodafone Young Hurler of the Year award. He ended up as an All-Ireland runner-up on three occasions.

At club level Collins plays with the Liam Mellows club in Galway. Won a senior league with Liam Mellows in 2016 as a centre back.

== Early life and education ==
Collins attended St. Joseph's Patrician College.

== Playing career ==
=== Club ===
Collins plays his club hurling with his local Liam Mellows GAA club in Galway. He has had some success at underage level, however, the club hadn't won a senior county club championship title since 1970 until Sunday 3 December 2017.

=== Inter-county ===
Collins first came to prominence on the inter-county scene as a member of the Galway minor hurling team. He enjoyed little success in this grade but later played with the under-21 county side. He won an All-Ireland medal with the Galway under-21 team in 2005 following a 1–15 to 1–14 defeat of Kilkenny.

By this stage Collins was a regular on the Galway senior team. He won a National League winners medal in 2004 as Galway defeated Waterford by 2–15 to 1–13. Later that year he made his championship debut at centre-back against Down.

In 2005 Galway defeated both Tipperary and Kilkenny in the All-Ireland series to qualify for an All-Ireland final showdown with Cork. It was the first meeting of Cork and Galway in an All-Ireland final since 1990. Men from the west had never beaten Cork in a championship decider. Neither side broke away into a considerable lead, however, at the final whistle, Cork was ahead by 1–21 to 1–16. In spite of this defeat, Collins ended the year as the Vodafone Young Hurler of the Year.

In 2007 Collins was appointed Galway captain.

After a number of disappointing seasons, Collins won a second National League medal in 2010 following a 2–22 to 1–17 defeat of Cork.

In 2012, Galway shocked reigning All-Ireland champions Kilkenny and won a historic Leinster title by 2–21 to 2–11. It was Collins' first provincial winners' medal in any grade. He was dropped from Galway panel in 2016.

== Honours ==
=== Team ===
Galway

- Leinster Senior Hurling Championship (1): 2012
- National Hurling League (2): 2004, 2010
- All-Ireland Under-21 Hurling Championship (1): 2005
- Connacht Under-21 Hurling Championship (1): 2005

Connacht

- Interprovincial Hurling Championship (1): 2004

Club:

Galway Senior Hurling Championship (1): 2017

=== Individual ===
- Vodafone Young Hurler of the Year (1): 2005
- All-Star (1): 2012

Awards
Preceded by Brian Murphy (Cork)	Vodafone Young Hurler of the Year; 2005	Succeeded by James 'Cha' Fitzpatrick (Kilkenny)
Sporting positions
Preceded by Liam Donoghue	Galway Senior Hurling Captain; 2007	Succeeded by Ollie Canning
Preceded by Fergal Moore	Galway Senior Hurling Captain; 2015	Succeeded by Incumbent
