= Liam Hodgins =

Galway hurler

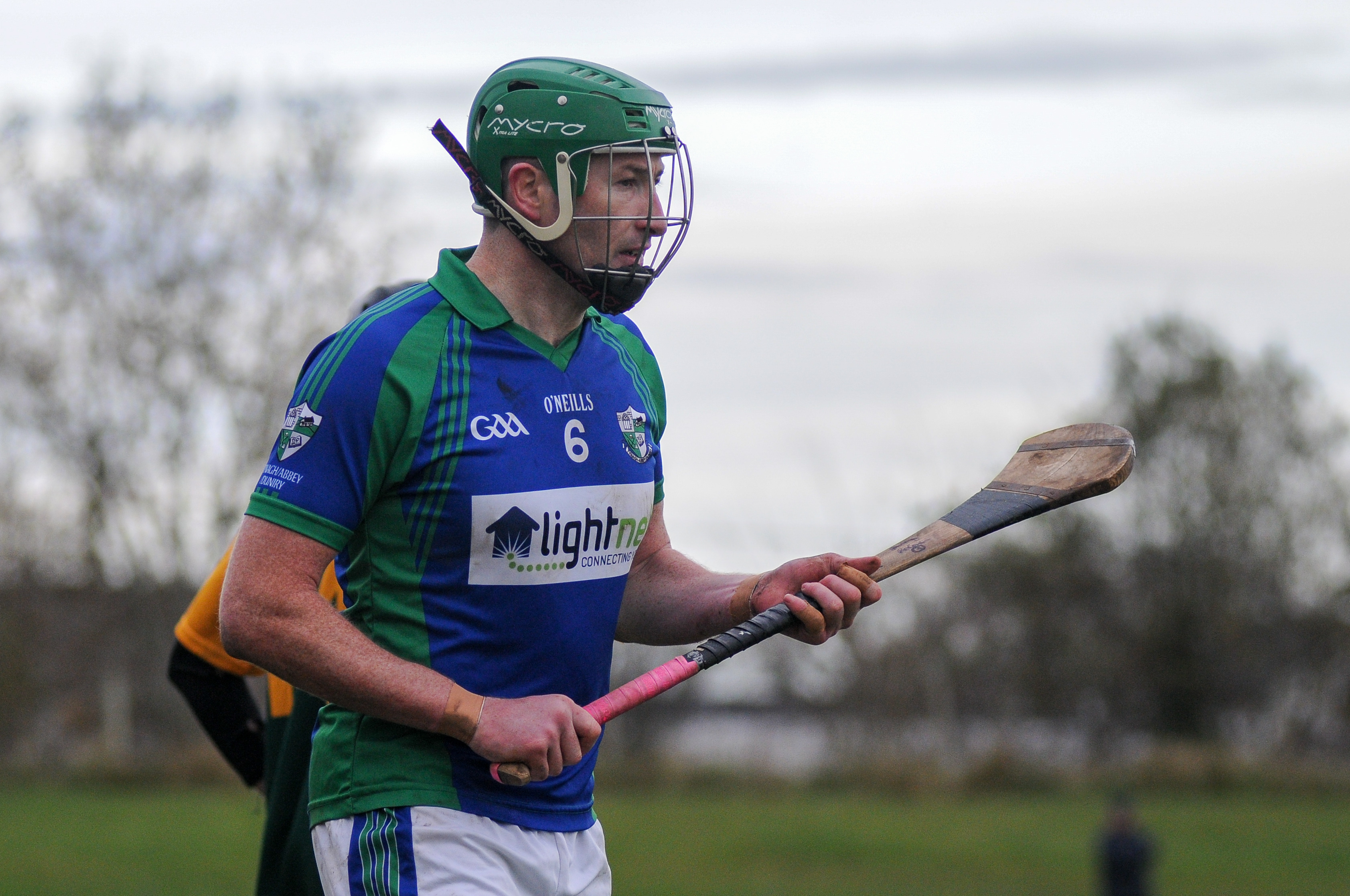

Personal information
- Born: Duniry, County Galway

Sport
- Sport: Hurling
- Position: Centre back
Club
- Years: Club
- Tynagh-Abbey/Duniry
Inter-county
- Years: County
- ?–2005: Galway
Inter-county titles
- All Stars: 1

Liam Hodgins is a three-time captain of the Galway senior hurling team. He won an All Star award in 2001, the same year Tipperary narrowly defeated Galway in the 2001 All-Ireland SHC final. Hodgins played at centre back that day.

He continues to play for his club Tynagh-Abbey/Duniry. Hodgins is one of the senior members of that team.

Sporting positions
| Preceded by Joe Rabbitte | Galway Senior Hurling Captain; 2001–3 | Succeeded by Ollie Canning |
