= Seán O'Neill (hurler) =

Irish hurler (born 1972)

Personal information
- Native name: Seán Ó Néill (Irish)
- Born: 1972 (age 53–54) Murroe, County Limerick, Ireland
- Occupation: Teacher
- Height: 6 ft 0 in (183 cm)

Sport
- Sport: Hurling
- Position: Midfield
Club
- Years: Club
- 1980s-2000s: Murroe-Boher
Inter-county
- Years: County
- 1993-1997: Limerick
Inter-county titles
- Munster titles: 2
- All-Irelands: 0
- NHL: 1
- All Stars: 0

Seán O'Neill (born 1972 in Murroe, County Limerick, Ireland) is an Irish retired sportsperson. He played hurling with his local club Murroe-Boher and was a member at inter-county level of the Limerick senior team from 1993 until 1997.
