= Shane Kavanagh =

Galway hurler

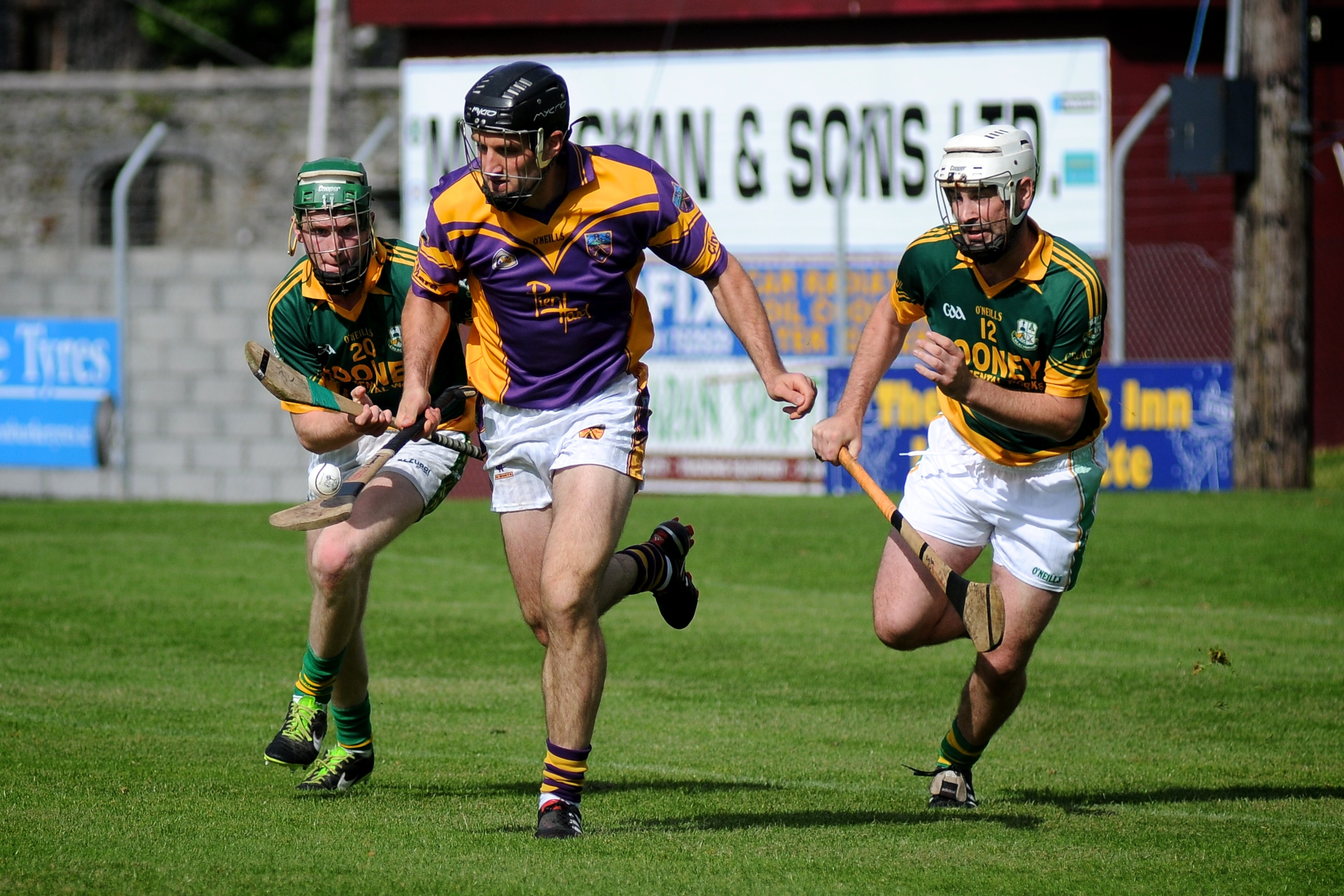
- Shane Kavanagh in action for Kinvara in 2013

Personal information
- Native name: Seán Caomhánach (Irish)
- Born: 1983 (age 42–43) Kinvara, County Galway
- Height: 6 ft 1 in (185 cm)

Sport
- Sport: Hurling
- Position: Full Back
Club
- Years: Club
- 2000–: Kinvara
Inter-county
Years	County	Apps (scores)
2004–2014	Galway	21 (0–1)
Inter-county titles
- NHL: 2

Shane Kavanagh (born 1983 in Kinvara, County Galway) is an Irish sportsman. He plays hurling with his local club Kinvara and was a member of the Galway senior inter-county team. Kavanagh was captain of the Galway county team that won the 2010 National Hurling League title.

Sporting positions
Preceded by Ollie Canning	Galway Senior Hurling Captain; 2010	Succeeded by Damien Joyce
Achievements
Preceded by Henry Shefflin (Kilkenny)	National Hurling League Final (Div 1) winning captain 2010	Succeeded by John McCaffrey (Dublin)
