= 2001 All-Ireland Senior Hurling Championship =

Championship details
- Dates: 15 April - 9 September 2001
- Teams: 21

All-Ireland champions
- Winning team: Tipperary (25th win)
- Captain: Tommy Dunne
- Manager: Nicky English

All-Ireland Finalists
- Losing team: Galway
- Captain: Liam Hodgins
- Manager: Noel Lane

Provincial champions
- Munster: Tipperary
- Leinster: Kilkenny
- Ulster: Derry
- Connacht: Not Played

Championship statistics
- No. matches played: 19
- Top Scorer: Eugene Cloonan (5–25)
- Player of the Year: Tommy Dunne
- All-Star Team: See here

The 2001 All-Ireland Senior Hurling Championship was the 114th staging of Ireland's premier hurling knock-out competition. Tipperary won the championship, beating Galway 2–18 to 2–15 in the final at Croke Park, Dublin.

== Calendar ==
Round	Date
Leinster Round One	Monday 7 May 2001
Ulster Quarter-Final	Tuesday May 15, 2001
Leinster Quarter-Final	Sunday 20 May 2001
Munster Quarter-Final	Sunday 27 May 2001
Munster Semi-Finals	Sunday 3 June 2001; Sunday 10 June 2001
Leinster Semi-Finals	Sunday 10 June 2001
Ulster Semi-Finals	Sunday 1 July 2001
Munster Final	Sunday 1 July 2001
Leinster Final	Sunday 8 July 2001
Ulster Final	Sunday 15 July 2001
All-Ireland Quarter-Finals	Sunday 29 July 2001
All-Ireland Semi-Finals	Sunday 12 August 2001; Sunday 19 August 2001
All-Ireland Final	Sunday 9 September 2001

== Format ==
The All-Ireland Senior Hurling Championship was run on a provincial basis as usual. All games were played on a knockout basis whereby once a team lost they were eliminated from the championship. The format for the All-Ireland series of games ran as follows:

- The winners of the Munster Championship advanced directly to one of the All-Ireland semi-finals.
- The winners of the Leinster Championship advanced directly to the second All-Ireland semi-final.
- The winners of the Ulster Championship advanced directly to one of the All-Ireland quarter-finals where they were drawn to play Galway. The winners of this game would later play the Leinster champions in the All-Ireland semi-final.
- The Munster runners-up were drawn to play the Leinster runners-up in the second All-Ireland quarter-final. The winners of this game would later play the Munster champions in the All-Ireland semi-final.

== Team changes ==
=== To Championship ===
Promoted from the All-Ireland Intermediate Hurling Championship

- Kildare
- Meath
- Wicklow

=== From Championship ===
Regraded to the All-Ireland Intermediate Hurling Championship

- Kerry

== Teams ==
=== General information ===
Twenty-one counties will compete in the All-Ireland Senior Hurling Championship: one team in the Connacht Senior Hurling Championship, ten teams in the Leinster Senior Hurling Championship, five teams in the Munster Senior Hurling Championship and five teams in the Ulster Senior Hurling Championship.

County	Last provincial title	Last championship title	Position in 2000 Championship
Antrim	1999	—	Runners-up (Ulster Senior Hurling Championship)
Carlow	—	—	Group Stage (Leinster Senior Hurling Championship)
Clare	1998	1997	Semi-finals (Munster Senior Hurling Championship)
Cork	2000	1999	Semi-finals
Derry	2000	—	Quarter-finals
Down	1997	—	Semi-finals (Ulster Senior Hurling Championship)
Dublin	1961	1938	Semi-finals (Leinster Senior Hurling Championship)
Galway	1999	1988	Semi-finals
Kildare	—	—	—
Kilkenny	2000	2000	Champions
Laois	1949	1915	Quarter-finals (Leinster Senior Hurling Championship)
Limerick	1996	1973	Semi-finals (Munster Senior Hurling Championship)
London	—	1901	Semi-finals (Ulster Senior Hurling Championship)
Meath	—	—	—
New York	—	—	Quarter-finals (Ulster Senior Hurling Championship)
Offaly	1995	1998	Runners-up
Tipperary	1993	1991	Quarter-finals
Waterford	1963	1959	Quarter-finals (Munster Senior Hurling Championship)
Westmeath	—	—	Group Stage (Leinster Senior Hurling Championship)
Wexford	1997	1996	Semi-finals (Leinster Senior Hurling Championship)
Wicklow	—	—	—

== Provincial championships ==
=== Leinster Senior Hurling Championship ===
April 15, 2001
First preliminary round

Wicklow	2–16 – 5–11	Kildare
J. Keogh (0–8), D. Hyland (1–2), W. O'Gorman (1–0), Michael Moran (0–1), C. O'Brien (0–1), J. Murphy (0–1), M. J. O'Neill (0–1), J. O'Toole (0–1), J. Berkery (0–1).		T. Carew (1–8), T. Spain (2–2), J. Dempsey (2–0), J. Brennan (0–1).

Pearse Park, Arklow
Referee: T. McIntyre (Antrim)

April 15, 2001
First preliminary round

Carlow	2–13 – 0–14	Westmeath
T. Walsh (1–3), J. Kavanagh (1–3), D. Murphy (0–4), D. Roberts (0–1), M. Farrell (0–1), J. Hickey (0–1).		A. Mitchell (0–11), B. Kennedy (0–1), N. Gavin (0–1), B. Williams (0–1).

Dr. Cullen Park, Carlow
Referee: J. Sexton (Limerick)

April 29, 2001
Second preliminary round

Carlow	1–4 – 2–17	Laois
D Murphy (1–0), J Nevin (0–1), D Roberts (0–1), T Walsh (0–1), J Kavanagh (0–1).		D Conroy (1–2), D Rooney (1–2), D Cuddy (0–4, three frees), O Dowling (0–3), P Phelan (0–2), F O'Sullivan (0–1), J Phelan (0–1), C Cuddy (0–1), J O'Sullivan (0–1).

Dr. Cullen Park, Carlow
Referee: G. Devlin (Armagh)

April 29, 2001
Second preliminary round

Kildare	2–24 – 2–25 (AET)	Meath
T Carew (0–16, 15 frees), C Sheridan (1–1), C Buggy (0–4), A McAndrew (1–0), N O'Callaghan (0–2), J Dempsey (0–1).		N Horan (2–15, one penalty and 12 frees), N Reilly (0–2), P Potterton (0–2), F McMahon (0–2), C Keena (0–1), P Donnelly (0–1), T Reilly (0–1, a 65), J Canty (0–1).

Conneff Park, Clane
Referee: S. Roche (Tipperary)

May 7, 2001
First Round

Laois	3–16 – 1–7	Meath
D. Cuddy (1–5), F. O'Sullivan (0–5), J. Young (1–1), D. Culleton (1–0), D. Rooney (0–2), D. Conroy (0–1), N. Lacey (0–1), J. O'Sullivan (0–1).		N. Horan (0–6), N. Reilly (1–0), P. Potterton (0–1).

O'Connor Park, Tullamore
Attendance: 1,500
Referee: D. Kirwan (Cork)

May 20, 2001
Quarter-Final

Laois	1–15 – 2–11	Dublin
D. Cuddy (0–10), P. Cuddy (1–0), D. Conroy (0–2), F. O'Sullivan (0–1), D. Culleton (0–1), D. Rooney (0–1).		T. McGrane (0–5), S. Martin (1–1), G. Ennis (1–0), K. Flynn (0–3), D. Sweeney (0–2).

Nowlan Park, Kilkenny
Attendance: 3,250
Referee: G. Harrington (Cork)

June 10, 2001
Semi-Final

Wexford	0–17 – 0–10	Laois
P. Codd (0–10), R. McCarthy (0–2), D. Ruth (0–1), M. Jordan (0–1), G. Laffan (0–1), B. Goff (0–1), A. Fenlon (0–1).		D. Cuddy (0–4), D. Rooney (0–2), J. Young (0–1), J. Phelan (0–1), P. Cuddy (0–1), D. Culleton (0–1).

Croke Park, Dublin
Attendance: 45,475
Referee: A. Mac Suibhne (Dublin)

June 10, 2001
Semi-Final

Kilkenny	3–21 – 0–18	Offaly
H. Shefflin (1–6), C. Carter (0–6), E. Brennan (1–2), J. Hoyne (1–0), J. Power (0–2), E. Kennedy (0–2), P. Larkin (0–1), D. J. Carey (0–1), A. Comerford (0–1).		J. Dooley (0–9), B. Murphy (0–2), R. Hanniffy (0–2), J. Troy (0–2), G. Hanniffy (0–1), C. Cassidy (0–1), J. Errity (0–1).

Croke Park, Dublin
Attendance: 45,475
Referee: M. Wadding (Waterford)

July 8, 2001
Final

Kilkenny	2–19 – 0–12	Wexford
C. Carter (0–7), B. McEvoy (0–4), H. Shefflin (0–4), D. J. Carey (1–0), E. Brennan (1–0), C. Brennan (0–2), J. Hoyne (0–1), S. Grehan (0–1).		P. Codd (0–5), D. Stamp (0–2), L. Murphy (0–1), B. Goff (0–1), T. Kelly (0–1), M. Jordan (0–1), R. Quigley (0–1).

Croke Park, Dublin
Attendance: 41,146
Referee: P. O'Connor (Limerick)

=== Munster Senior Hurling Championship ===
May 27, 2001
Quarter-Final

Cork	1–15 – 1–16	Limerick
J. Deane (0–4), A. Browne (1–3), M. Landers (0–2), S. McGrath (0–2), B. O'Connor (0–2), P. Ryan (0–1), J. O'Connor (0–1), D. O'Sullivan (0–1).	(Report)	P. O'Grady (0–5), B. Foley (0–4), J. Butler (1–1), O. Moran (0–3), B. Begley (0–3).

Páirc Uí Chaoimh, Cork
Attendance: 37,792
Referee: P. Horan (Offaly)

June 3, 2001
Semi-Final

Tipperary	0–15 – 0–14	Clare
E. Kelly (0–7), E. Enright (0–2), T. Dunne (0–2), B. O'Meara (0–1), L. Corbett (0–1), D. Ryan (0–1), P. Kelly (0–1).	(Report)	J. O'Connor (0–7), D. Forde (0–4), S. McMahon (0–3).

Páirc Uí Chaoimh, Cork
Attendance: 42,063
Referee: D. Murphy (Wexford)

June 10, 2001
Semi-Final

Limerick	4–11 – 2–14	Waterford
P. O'Grady (0–7), B. Begley (2–0), O. Moran (1–1), J. Butler (1–0), J. Foley (0–2), MJ Moran (0–1).	(Report)	P. Flynn (1–4), K. McGrath (0–4), S. Prendergast (1–0), T. Browne (0–2), D. Shanahan (0–1), F. Hartley (0–1), J. Mullane (0–1), M. White (0–1).

Páirc Uí Chaoimh, Cork
Attendance: 40,673
Referee: P. Horan (Offaly)

July 1, 2001
Final

Tipperary	2–16 – 1–17	Limerick
D. Ryan (1–1), L. Corbett (1–1), M. O'Leary (0–3), B. O'Meara (0–2), E. Enright (0–2), T. Dunne (0–2), E. Kelly (0–2), P. Kelly (0–1), E. O'Neill (0–1), J. O'Brien (0–1).	(Report)	S. O'Connor (1–3), P. O'Grady (0–5), M. Foley (0–2), C. Carey (0–1), M. O'Brien (0–1), J. Foley (0–1), O. Moran (0–1), J. Butler (0–1), B. Begley (0–1), B. Foley (0–1).

Páirc Uí Chaoimh, Cork
Attendance: 43,500
Referee: P. Horan (Offaly)

=== Ulster Senior Hurling Championship ===
Despite the Foot and Mouth and London withdraw from the football championship they remained in the Hurling championship at the time.

May 15, 2001
Quarter-Final

New York	2–12 – 1–16	Down
B. Kennedy (0–6), T. Moylan (1–2), J. Madden (1–0), B. McCabe (0–2), V. Norton (0–1), T. Simms (0–1).		T. Coulter (1–4), N. Sands (0–9), M. Coulter (0–2), J. McGrattan (0–1).

Gaelic Park, New York City
Referee: P. O'Connor (Limerick)

July 1, 2001
Semi-Final

Derry	1–24 – 0–12	London
O. Collins (0–6), G. McGonigle (0–6), J. O'Dwyer (1–2), Gregory Biggs (0–3), Gary Biggs (0–3), M. Collins (0–2), R. Kennedy (0–1), R. McCloskey (0–1).		E. Kinlon (0–5), B. Keane (0–3), S. Linnane (0–3), I. Rocks (0–1).

Casement Park, Belfast
Referee: E. Morris (Dublin)

July 1, 2001
Semi-Final

Antrim	1–10 – 2–14	Down
Graham O'Kane (1–1), Conor MacCambridge (0–4), J. McIntosh (0–1), J. Connolly (0–1), B. McFall (0–1), Ciarán MacCambridge (0–1), A. Delargy (0–1).		N. Sands (0–4), P. Braniff (0–4), P. Mallon (1–0), M. Coulter (1–0), T. Coulter (0–3), G. McGrattan (0–1), G. Adair (0–1).

Casement Park, Belfast
Referee: P. Dunphy (Kilkenny)

July 15, 2001
Final

Derry	1–17 – 3–10	Down
G. McGonigle (1–8), J. O'Dwyer (0–3), Greg Biggs (0–2), O. Collins (0–2), R. McCloskey (0–1), Gary Biggs (0–1).		N. Sands (2–0), T. Coulter (0–5), P. Braniff (0–3), B. Coulter (1–0), G. McGrattan (0–1), G. Adair (0–1).

Casement Park, Belfast
Attendance: 4,000
Referee: P. Aherne (Carlow)

== All-Ireland Senior Hurling Championship ==
=== Bracket ===
Quarter-Finals; July 29
Wexford	4–10
Limerick	2–15
Galway	4–23
Derry*	1–11

Semi-Finals; August 12 / 18 / 19
Tipperary*	1–16, 3–12
Wexford	3–10, 0–10
Kilkenny*	1–13
Galway	2–15

Final; September 9
Tipperary*	2–18
Galway	2–15

Note: * = Provincial Champion

=== All-Ireland quarter-finals ===
July 29, 2001
Quarter-Final

Wexford	4–10 – 2–15	Limerick
D. Fitzhenry (2–0), P. Codd (1–2), R. McCarthy (1–0), M. Jordan (0–2), L. Murphy (0–2), L. Dunne (0–1), G. Laffan (0–1), A. Fenlon (0–1), N. Lambert (0–1).		P. O'Grady (0–8), B. Foley (2–0), B. Begley (0–2), M. Foley (0–1), C. Carey (0–1), O. Moran (0–1), J. Moran (0–1), D. Reale (0–1).

Croke Park, Dublin
Attendance: 36,850
Referee: M. Wadding (Waterford))

July 29, 2001
Quarter-Final

Galway	4–23 – 1–11	Derry
E. Cloonan (2–11), K. Broderick (2–3), A. Kerins (0–2), F. Healy (0–2), J. Rabbitte (0–2), R. Nurray (0–1), D. Shaughnessy (0–1), L. Hodgins (0–1).	(report)	O. Collins (1–1), G. McGonigle (0–3), G. Biggs (0–3), J. O'Dwyer (0–1), D. McGrellis (0–1), R. Kennedy (0–1), M. Conway (0–1).

Croke Park, Dublin
Attendance: 36,850
Referee: B. Kelly (Westmeath)

=== All-Ireland semi-finals ===
August 12, 2001
Semi-Final

Wexford	1–16 – 3–10	Tipperary
L. O'Gorman (2–0), M. Jordan (0–4), P. Codd (0–4), R. McCarthy (1–0), A. Fenlon (0–2).	(report)	E. Kelly (0–5), J. Carroll (1–1), M. O'Leary (0–4), T. Dunne (0–2), E. Enright (0–1), B. O'Meara (0–1), M. Ryan (0–1), L. Corbett (0–1).

Croke Park, Dublin
Attendance: 50,274
Referee: P. O'Connor (Limerick)

August 18, 2001
Semi-Final
Replay

Tipperary	3–12 – 0–10	Wexford
E. Kelly (0–9), E. O'Neill (2–1), J. Carroll (1–0), M. O'Leary (0–2).	(report)	P. Codd (0–7), L. Murphy (0–1), M. Jordan (0–1), B. Goff (0–1).

Croke Park, Dublin
Attendance: 39,125
Referee: P. Horan (Offaly)

August 19, 2001
Semi-Final

Galway	2–15 – 1–13	Kilkenny
E. Cloonan (2–9), K. Broderick (0–2), M. Kerins (0–1), R. Murray (0–1), J. Rabbitte (0–1), B. Higgins (0–1).	(report)	H. Shefflin (0–9), D. J. Carey (1–1), J. Power (0–2), C. Carter (0–1).

Croke Park, Dublin
Attendance: 34,801
Referee: P. O'Connor (Limerick)

=== All-Ireland Final ===
September 9, 2001
Final

Tipperary	2–18 – 2–15	Galway
M. O'Leary (2–1), E. Kelly (0–7), T. Dunne (0–5), L. Corbett (0–2), J. Carroll (0–1), D. Ryan (0–1), P. O'Brien (0–1).	(report)	E. Cloonan (1–5), F. Healy (1–2), K. Broderick (0–5), M. Kerins (0–2), J. Rabbitte (0–1).

Croke Park, Dublin
Attendance: 68,515
Referee: P. O'Connor (Limerick)

Tipperary	Galway

== Championship statistics ==
=== Top scorers ===
==== Overall ====
Rank	Player	County	Tally	Total	Matches	Average
1	Eugene Cloonan	Galway	5–25	40	3	13.33
2	Eoin Kelly	Tipperary	0–30	30	5	6.00
3	Nicky Horan	Meath	2–21	27	2	13.50
4	Paul O'Grady	Limerick	0–25	25	4	6.25
5	Paul Codd	Wexford	1–21	24	4	6.00
6	Henry Shefflin	Kilkenny	1–19	22	3	7.33
6	David Cuddy	Laois	1–19	22	3	7.33
8	Geoffrey McGonigle	Derry	1–17	20	3	6.66
9	Noel Sands	Derry	2–13	19	3	6.66
10	Kevin Broderick	Galway	2–10	16	3	5.33

==== Single game ====
Rank	Player	County	Tally	Total	Opposition
1	Nicky Horan	Meath	2–15	21	Kildare
2	Eugene Cloonan	Galway	2–11	17	Derry
3	Eugene Cloonan	Galway	2–9	15	Kilkenny
4	Geoffrey McGonagle	Derry	1–8	11	Down
5	David Cuddy	Laois	0–10	10	Dublin
5	Paul Codd	Wexford	0–10	10	Laois
6	Henry Shefflin	Kilkenny	1–6	9	Offaly
6	Johnny Dooley	Offaly	0–9	9	Kilkenny
6	Kevin Broderick	Galway	2–3	9	Derry
6	Eoin Kelly	Tipperary	0–9	9	Wexford
6	Henry Shefflin	Kilkenny	0–9	9	Galway

== Miscellaneous ==
- Tipperary won their first All-Ireland since 1991.
- Despite on London's withdraw from the football championship due to Foot and Mouth crisis in England they decided to stay in the Hurling championship.
