= Pat Mulcahy (Cork hurler) =

Irish hurler (born 1975)

Personal information
- Native name: Pádraig Ó Maolcathaigh (Irish)
- Born: 25 August 1975 (age 51) Newtownshandrum, County Cork, Ireland
- Occupation: Network analyst
- Height: 6 ft 1 in (185 cm)

Sport
- Sport: Hurling
- Position: Full Back
Clubs
- Years: Club
- Newtownshandrum; Avondhu
Club titles
- Cork titles: 5
- Munster titles: 3
- All-Ireland Titles: 1
Inter-county
Years	County	Apps (scores)
1997-2006	Cork	18 (0-00)
Inter-county titles
- Munster titles: 4
- All-Irelands: 2
- NHL: 1
- All Stars: 1

Pat Mulcahy (born 25 August 1975) is an Irish hurler who played as a Full back for the Cork senior team.

Mulcahy made his first appearance for the team during the 1997 championship and was a regular member of the starting fifteen until his retirement almost a decade later. During that time he won two All-Ireland winners' medal, four Munster winners' medals and one All-Star award. He ended up as an All-Ireland runner-up on two occasions.

At club level Mulcahy is an All-Ireland medalist with Newtownshandrum. In addition to this he has also won three Munster winners' medals and five county club championship winners' medals.

In retirement from inter-county hurling Mulcahy became involved in team management and coaching. In 2011 he was appointed manager of the Cork Institute of Technology senior hurling team.

== Playing career ==
=== Club ===
Mulcahy plays his club hurling with Newtownshandrum and has enjoyed much success in a lengthy career.

He tasted his first major success with the club in 1996 when he won a county intermediate championship medal following a 0-12 to 0-9 defeat of Cloyne. As a result of this victory Newtown joined the top tier of club hurling in Cork for the first time in history.

That same year Mulcahy lined out with the Avondhu divisional team that reached the final of the county senior championship. Neighbouring division Imokilly provided the opposition, however, a 1-12 apiece draw was the result. Avondhu won the replay by two points giving Mulcahy his first county senior championship medal.

Four years later in 2000, Mulcahy enjoyed the ultimate success with Newtownshandrum. A 0-14 to 0-11 defeat of Erin's Own gave him his second county senior championship medal.

After a few seasons out of the spotlight Newtownshandrum were back in 2003. A 0-17 to 0-9 defeat of three-in-a-row hopefuls Blackrock gave Mulcahy his third county senior championship medal. Newtown later represented Cork in the provincial series and even reached the final. A 2-18 to 2-9 defeat of Patrickswell gave Mulcahy his first Munster winners' medal. Newtownshandrum subsequently reached the All-Ireland final where Dunloy were the opponents. The northerners provided little opposition and a one-sided contest resulted in a 0-17 to 1-6 victory for Newtownshandrum. It was Mulcahy's first All-Ireland medal.

After surrendering their titles in 2004, Newtownshandrum were back in the county championship decider again the following year. A 0-15 to 0-9 defeat of Cloyne gave Mulcahy his fourth county senior championship medal. He later added a second Munster medal to his collection following a narrow 0-16 to 1-12 defeat of Ballygunner. Newtown subsequently reached the All-Ireland decider again where Portumna provided the opposition. A masterclass by Joe Canning and his brother Ollie resulted in a defeat for Mulcahy's side by 2-8 to 1-6.

While many expected Newtownshandrum to go into decline, the team bounced back in 2009 to reach another county championship final. A 3-22 to 1-12 thrashing of reigning champions Sarsfield's gave Mulcahy a fifth county senior championship medal. He later won a third Munster medal following a 2-11 to 2-9 defeat of Ballygunner.

=== Inter-county ===
Mulcahy first played for Cork as a member of the under-21 hurling team in 1995. He enjoyed little success in this grade.

Two years later in 1997 Mulcahy was captain of the Cork intermediate hurling team. He won a Munster medal in this grade that year following a 1-15 to 1-12 defeat of Limerick. Cork later qualified for the All-Ireland decider. A 2-11 to 1-12 defeat of Galway gave Mulcahy an All-Ireland medal.

Mulcahy made his senior debut for Cork in their opening championship game against Kerry in 2000. He remained on the periphery of the team until 2003 when he secured a regular place on the starting fifteen. He won his second Munster medal that year following a 3-16 to 3-12 defeat of Waterford. Cork later reached the All-Ireland decider where Kilkenny provided the opposition. A close game developed, however, a Martin Comerford goal secured the title for "the Cats" on a score line of 1-14 to 1-11.

In 2004, because of a car accident he missed most of Cork's successful championship campaign, however, he returned at corner-back the following year. He won a second provincial medal in Cork's Munster final triumph over Tipperary. Later championship victories set up an All-Ireland final showdown with Galway. A Ben O'Connor goal on that occasion helped Cork to a 1-21 to 1-16 victory and a first All-Ireland medal for Mulcahy. He was later honoured with an All-Star award.

Mulcahy was appointed captain of the Cork senior hurling team in 2006 as Cork continued their winning ways. He won his third Munster medal that year as Tipperary were accounted for in the provincial decider once again. Cork later reached the All-Ireland final where they were in search of their third consecutive championship. Kilkenny stood in their way and secured the victory courtesy of an Aidan Fogarty goal.

Mulcahy retired from inter county hurling at the end of 2006.

=== Inter-provincial ===
Mulcahy also lined out with Munster in the inter-provincial championship. He won his sole Railway Cup medal in 2005 as Munster defeated Leinster by 1-21 to 2-14 in Boston.

== Managerial career ==
=== Cork Institute of Technology ===
Mulcahy was appointed manager of the Cork Institute of Technology senior hurling team in 2011. He led them to the final of the 2011 Cork Senior Hurling Championship where they had a surprise loss to Carrigtwohill.

== Honours ==
=== Team ===
Newtownshandrum

- All-Ireland Senior Club Hurling Championship (1): 2004
- Munster Senior Club Hurling Championship (3): 2003, 2005, 2009
- Cork Senior Club Hurling Championship (4): 2000, 2003, 2005, 2009

Avondhu

- Cork Senior Club Hurling Championship (1): 1996

Cork

- All-Ireland Senior Hurling Championship (2): 2004, 2005
- Munster Senior Hurling Championship (3): 2003, 2005, 2006 (c)

Munster

- Railway Cup (1): 2005

Sporting positions
Preceded by No championship	Cork Intermediate Hurling Captain; 1997	Succeeded by Maurice Cahill
Preceded by Seán Óg Ó hAilpín	Cork Senior Hurling Captain; 2006	Succeeded by Kieran Murphy
Achievements
Suspended	All-Ireland Intermediate Hurling Final winning captain 1997	Succeeded by John Cormican (Limerick)
