= Liam Donoghue =

Galway hurling goalkeeper (born 1974)

Personal information
- Native name: Liam Ó Donnchú (Irish)
- Born: 7 September 1974 (age 52) Clarinbridge, County Galway
- Height: 5 ft 10 in (178 cm)

Sport
- Sport: Hurling
- Position: Goalkeeper
Club
- Years: Club
- 1992–2012: Clarinbridge
Club titles
- Galway titles: 2
- Connacht titles: 1
- All-Ireland Titles: 1
Inter-county
Years	County	Apps (scores)
2001–2006	Galway	14 (0–0)

Liam Donoghue (born September 1974) is an Irish sportsman who plays hurling with his local club Clarinbridge. He played at senior level for the Galway county team from 2003 until 2006.

== Early life ==
Liam Donoghue was born in Clarinbridge, County Galway in 1974. Educated at Killeeneen National School and Athenry Vocational School.

== Playing career ==
=== Club ===
Donoghue plays his club hurling with Clarinbridge. He won numerous underage titles at club level, an All Ireland Minor medal in 1992 and was sub goalkeeper on the U-21 All Ireland winning team of 1993. Captained Clarinbridge in their inaugural Senior County Final appearance in 1997, and was man of the match when they won their first ever Galway Senior Hurling Championship title against Athenry in 2001. Later that year Donoghue won a Connacht club hurling title, however, his side were defeated by Birr in the All-Ireland club final. All-Ireland glory finally arrived in 2011 when Clarinbridge won county and club All-Ireland honours, defeating Oloughlin Gaels on St. Patricks in Croke Park.

=== Inter-county ===
After his involvement in the successful minor and U-21 teams of the early 1990s, it was expected that he would be an automatic choice to join the Galway senior team. However, the goalkeeping position went to Morgan Darcy. Donoghue turned to association football after this. He played with Kiltulla F.C. and helped the team reach the quarter-finals of the FAI Junior Cup. Over the course of the whole season Donoghue scored a remarkable forty goals. He later joined Galway United and, although he never played in the League of Ireland, he regularly lined out in the Connacht Senior League.

In 2001, Donoghue joined the Galway senior hurling panel, and was sub goalkeeper when Tipperary defeated Galway in the All-Ireland SHC final of that year. In 2003, Donoghue returned to the Galway senior team as the first-choice goalkeeper. He Won a National League Title in 2004, and was appointed captain in 2005, steering his native-county to an All-Ireland SHC final showdown with Cork; however, Galway lost the game by four points. He was named team captain again for the 2006 team.

New manager Ger Loughnane dropped Donoghue from the Galway panel in 2007.

He was joint manager with Liam Coleman of the county's camogie team for the 2008 All-Ireland Senior Camogie Championship final.

Preceded by Ollie Canning	Galway Senior Hurling Captain; 2005–2006	Succeeded by David Collins
