= Niall Healy =

Galway hurler

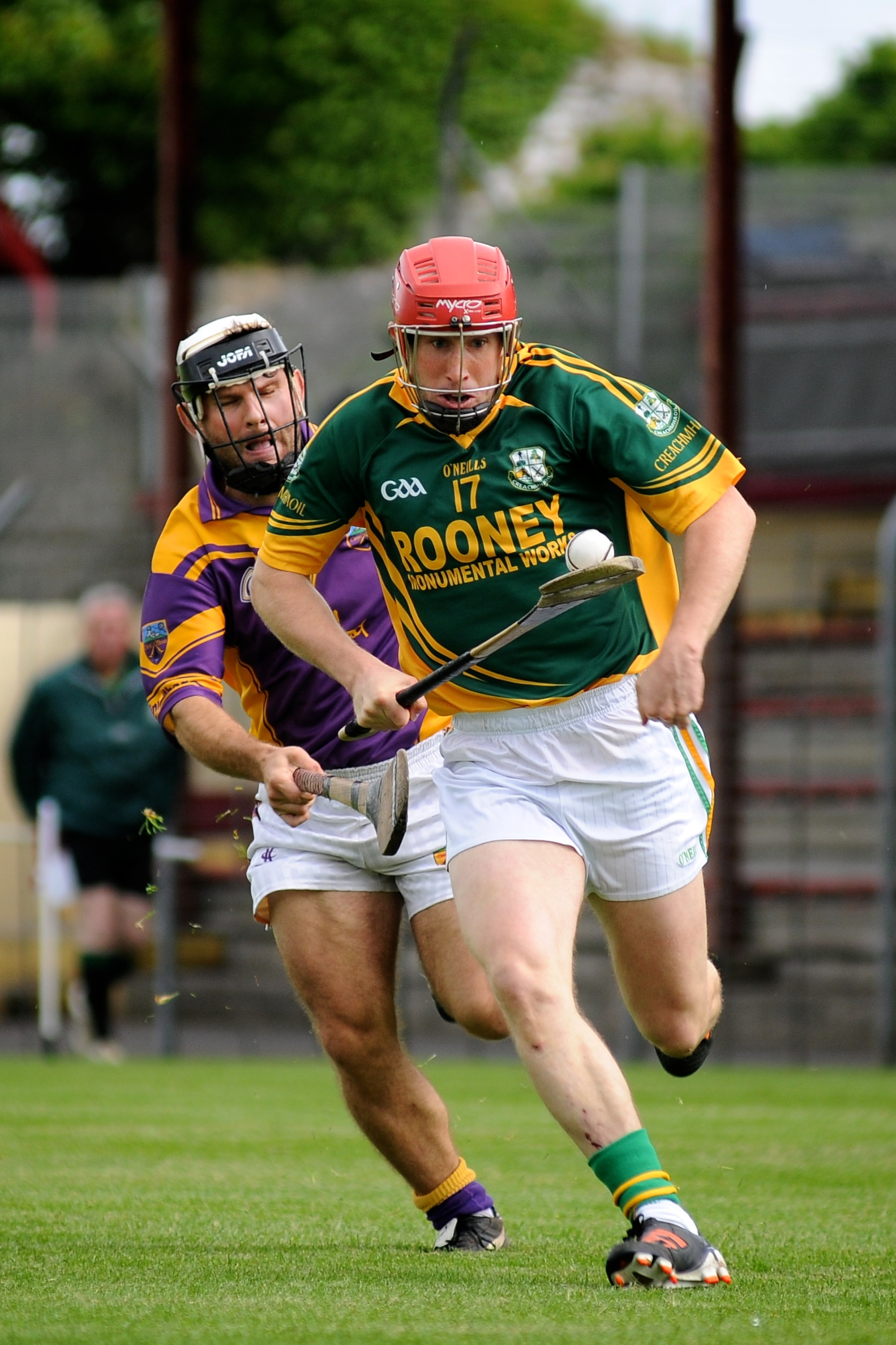
- Healy (right) in action for Craughwell in 2013

Personal information
- Native name: Niall Ó hÉilí (Irish)
- Born: 14 April 1985 (age 41) Galway, Ireland
- Occupation: Manufacturing operations
- Height: 1.78 m (5 ft 10 in)

Sport
- Sport: Hurling
- Position: Left corner-forward
Club
- Years: Club
- Craughwell
Club titles
- Galway titles: 0
College
- Years: College
- Limerick Institute of Technology
College titles
- Fitzgibbon titles: 1
Inter-county
Years	County	Apps (scores)
2005–2015	Galway	23 (12–29)
Inter-county titles
- Leinster titles: 1
- All-Irelands: 0
- NHL: 1

Niall Healy (born 14 April 1985) is an Irish sportsperson. He plays hurling with his local club Craughwell and, from 2005, was involved at senior level with the Galway county team. Healy was top scorer in the 2015 galway senior hurling championship, scoring a total of 8–75 over 9 games. Healy damaged his cruciate ligament playing for his club Craughwell in May 2014 and would in turn miss the rest of the season.

== Career statistics ==
Team	Year	National League			Leinster		All-Ireland		Total	
Team	Year	Division	Apps	Score	Apps	Score	Apps	Score	Apps	Score
Galway	2005	Division 1A	5	1-02	—		5	4-04	10	5-06
Galway	2006	Division 1A	5	0-09	—		3	1-04	8	1-13
Galway	2007	Division 1A	6	1-11	—		3	1-07	9	2-18
Galway	2008	Division 1A	6	3-09	—		2	0-01	8	3-10
Galway	2009	Division 1	7	3-19	2	4-06	3	1-03	12	8-28
Galway	2010	Division 1	6	3-15	2	0-01	1	0-00	9	3-16
Galway	2011	Division 1	4	0-04	0	0-00	0	0-00	4	0-04
Galway	2012	Division 1A	1	0-01	0	0-00	0	0-00	1	0-01
Galway	2013	Division 1A	3	1-02	0	0-00	1	1-00	4	2-02
Galway	2014	Division 1A	6	1-14	0	0-00	0	0-00	6	1-14
Galway	2015	Division 1A	1	0-00	3	0-02	1	0-01	5	0-03
Career total			50	13-86	7	4-09	19	8-20	76	25-115

== Honours ==
Limerick Institute of Technology

- Fitzgibbon Cup: 2007

Galway

- Leinster Senior Hurling Championship: 2012
- National Hurling League: 2010
- All-Ireland Under-21 Hurling Championship: 2005
