= Damien Joyce =

Irish hurler

Personal information
- Native name: Damien Seoige (Irish)
- Nickname: DJ
- Born: 1980 (age 45–46) Ballinasloe, Ireland

Sport
- Sport: Hurling
- Position: Right Corner Back
Club
- Years: Club
- 1998-: Cappataggle
Inter-county
| Years | County | Apps (scores) |
| 2002-2011 | Galway | 25 (0-2) |
Inter-county titles
- NHL: 2

Damien Joyce (born 1980) is an Irish sportsperson. He played with the Galway senior inter-county hurling team, captaining them in 2011. He plays for his local club Cappataggle.

Sporting positions
| Preceded by Shane Kavanagh | Galway Senior Hurling Captain; 2011 | Succeeded by Fergal Moore |
