= David Hoey (hurler) =

Irish hurler

Sport
- Sport: Hurling
- Position: Half-Back
Club
- Years: Club
- St Joseph's Doora-Barefield
Club titles
- Clare titles: 3
- Munster titles: 2
- All-Ireland Titles: 1
Inter-county
- Years: County
- 2000 - 2007: Clare
Inter-county titles
- Munster titles: 0
- All-Irelands: 0
- NHL: 0
- All Stars: 0

David Hoey is a retired Irish hurler who played as a defender for the Clare senior team. At club level Hoey played with St Joseph's Doora-Barefield. Hoey won an All-Ireland Senior Club Hurling Championship with St Joseph's Doora-Barefield in 1999 when they defeated Rathnure by 2-14 to 0-8 in the final at Croke Park.

Hoey was part of the Clare team that reached the 2002 All-Ireland Final, starting at right half back in a 2-20 to 0-19 defeat to Kilkenny.
