= David Forde (Galway hurler) =

Irish hurler

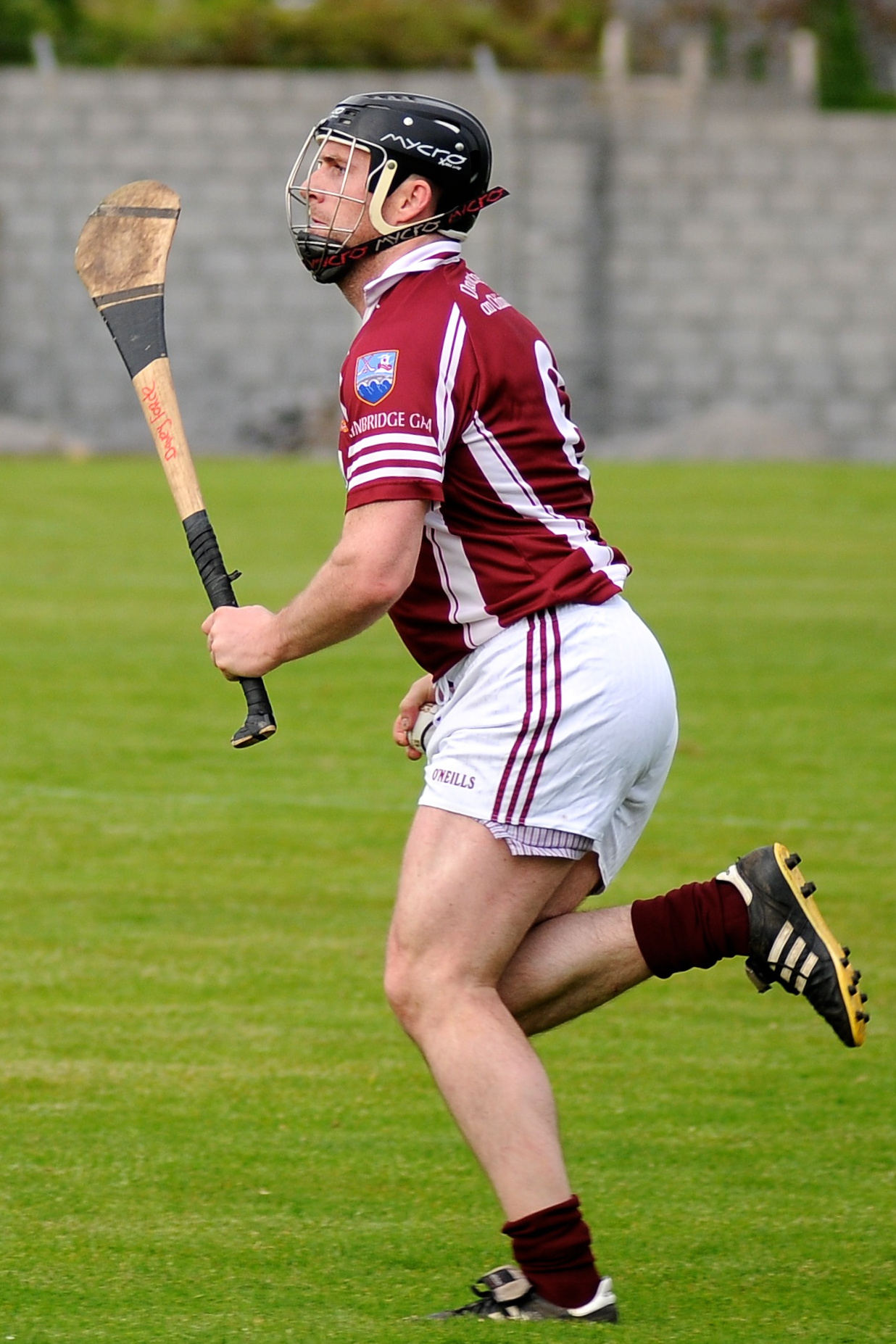
- David Forde in action for Clarinbridge in 2013

Personal information
- Born: 1981 (age 44–45) Clarinbridge, County Galway

Sport
- Sport: Hurling
- Position: Centre Forward
Club
- Years: Club
- Clarinbridge
Club titles
- Galway titles: 2
- Connacht titles: 1
- All-Ireland Titles: 1
Inter-county
- Years: County
- 2000-: Galway

David Forde (born 1981) is an Irish sportsperson. He plays hurling with his local club Clarinbridge and is a member of the Galway senior team.
