= Derek Hardiman =

Irish sportsman

Personal information
- Born: 19 September 1980 (age 46) Ballinasloe, Ireland
- Height: 6 ft 0 in (183 cm)

Sport
- Sport: Hurling
- Position: Right half back
Club
- Years: Club
- 1999-: Mullagh
Inter-county
- Years: County
- 2001-2008: Galway
Inter-county titles
- NHL: 1
- All Stars: 1

Derek Hardiman (born 1981) is an Irish sportsman. He plays in the right wing-back position on the Galway senior hurling team.

Derek Hardiman hails from the Mullagh Gaelic Athletic Association club in County Galway. He has been playing senior hurling with Galway for several years now and has won a National Hurling League title with the side in 2004. Hardiman played in the 2005 All-Ireland Hurling Final against Cork, but only ended up with a runners-up medal. He was named on the All-Stars team in the same year.
