= David Tierney =

Galway hurler and Gaelic footballer

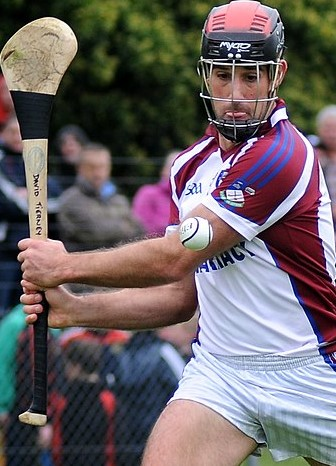
- David Tierney in action for Kilnadeema–Leitrim in 2013

Personal information
- Native name: Daithí Ó Tiarna (Irish)
- Born: 21 October 1979 (age 47) Ballinasloe, Ireland
- Height: 6 ft 2 in (188 cm)

Sport
- Football Position: Midfield
- Hurling Position: Midfield
Clubs
- Years: Club
- Kilnadeema–Leitrim (H); St Grellan's (F); Loughrea (F); Salthill–Knocknacarra (F)
Club titles
	Football	Hurling
Galway titles	1	
Inter-county
Years	County	Apps (scores)
1999–2009 2000	Galway (H); Galway (F)	? (4–21)
Inter-county titles
	Football	Hurling
League titles		2

David John Tierney (born 21 October 1979) is an Irish sportsman. He plays hurling with his local club Kilnadeema–Leitrim and at senior level for the Galway county team.

== Football ==
He also had a brief stint with the Galway county football squad in 2000 and played his club football with St Grellan's.

He began playing football for Salthill–Knocknacarra in 2012, when he won a County final against Tuam Stars.
