= Richie Murray =

Irish hurler

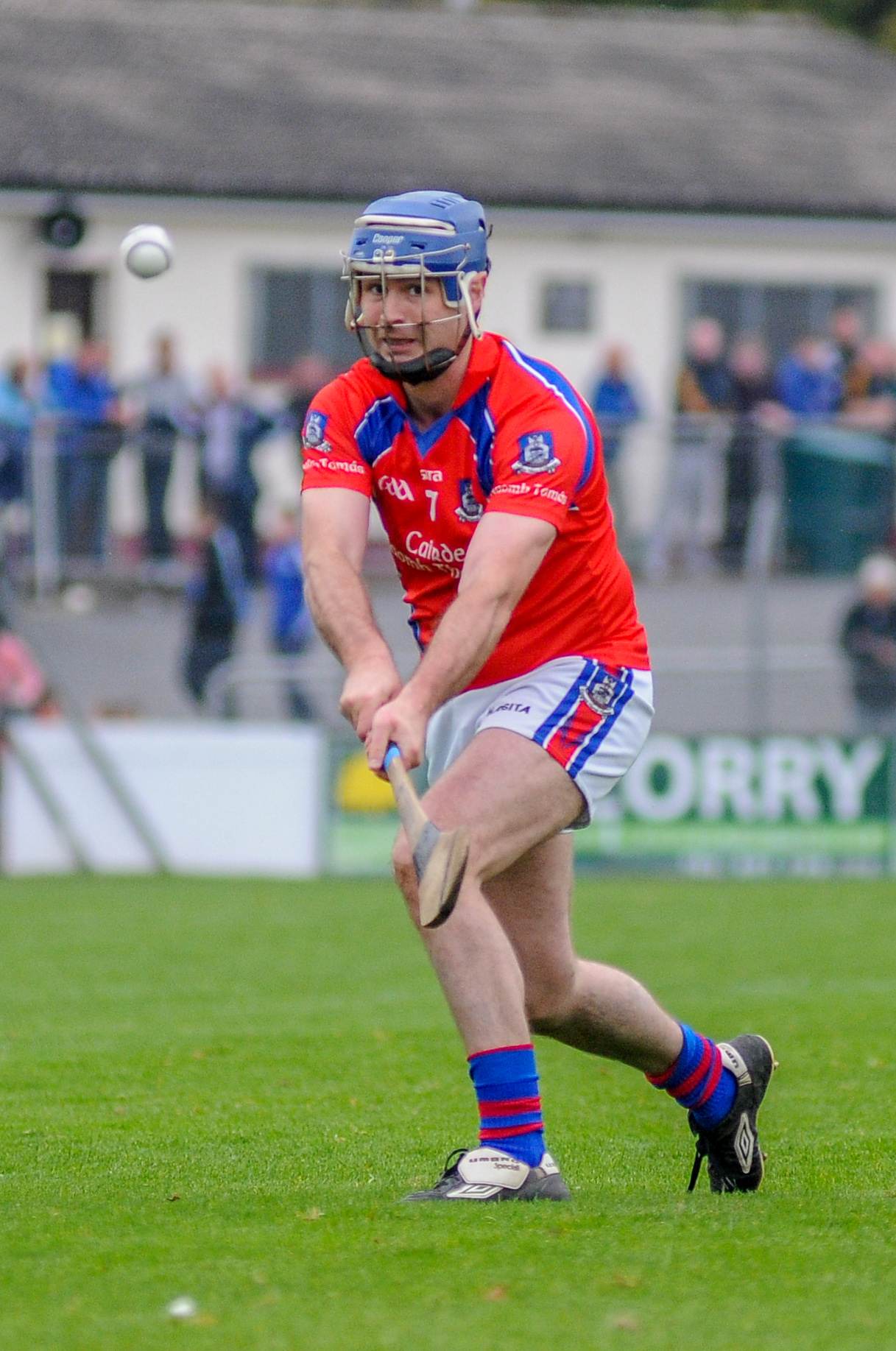
- Richie Murray in 2015

Personal information
- Native name: Risteard Ó Muirí (Irish)
- Born: 1982 (age 43–44) Ballinasloe, Ireland
- Occupation: Financial Advisor
- Height: 6 ft 1 in (185 cm)

Sport
- Sport: Hurling
- Position: Midfield
Club
- Years: Club
- 1999-2014: St Thomas'
Club titles
- Galway titles: 1
- Connacht titles: 1
- All-Ireland Titles: 1
Inter-county
Years	County	Apps (scores)
2001-2009	Galway	24 (3-25)
Inter-county titles
- NHL: 1

Richie Murray (born 1982 in Ballinasloe) is an Irish sportsperson. He plays hurling with his local club St Thomas' and with the Galway senior inter-county team. He has won 2 All-Ireland minor hurling medals with Galway, captaining the winning team in 2000.
