= Alan Kerins =

Irish sportsman, humanitarian, social entrepreneur and philanthropist

Personal information
- Born: 1977 (age 48–49) Galway, Ireland
- Height: 1.78 m (5 ft 10 in)

Sport
- Football Position: Right corner-forward
- Hurling Position: Left half-forward
Clubs
- Years: Club
- Clarinbridge; Salthill–Knocknacarra
Club titles
| | Football | Hurling |
| Galway titles | 2 | 2 |
| Connacht titles | 1 | 1 |
| All-Ireland titles | 1 | 1 |
Inter-county
| Years | County | Apps (scores) |
| 1997–2011 2001–2003 | Galway (H); Galway (F) | ? (12-78); 16 (4–9) |
Inter-county titles
| | Football | Hurling |
| Connacht Titles | 2 | 3 |
| All-Ireland Titles | 1 | 0 |
| League titles | 0 | 3 |
| All-Stars | 0 | 2 |

Alan Kerins (born 1977) is an Irish sportsman, humanitarian, social entrepreneur and philanthropist.

Kerins was a dual player for Galway, a hurler between 1997 and 2011 and a footballer between 2001 and 2004. He played with the senior inter-county team until 2011. Kerins played hurling with his local club Clarinbridge and football with Salthill–Knocknacarra. He is also founder and CEO of The Inner Winner Institute, a personal development training company.

== Early life ==
Kerins's mother runs a B&B in Clarinbridge. His father Monty was a significant presence as a coach of hurling in Galway and was a selector for the county's minor and senior teams.

Kerins studied physiotherapy at Trinity College Dublin.

== Playing career ==
Kerins has the distinction of winning All-Ireland medals in both Gaelic games codes (football and hurling) with his county and his club teams – a feat rarely achieved.

He holds the unique distinction of having won All-Ireland Club medals in both hurling and football and is the only man to ever do so with different clubs. Until 2025, the eleven other players to have achieved this before him all played for St Finbarr's of Cork, at which point all twelve were joined by Dublin's Con O'Callaghan who did so with Cuala.

=== Club ===
Kerins played his club football with Salthill–Knocknacarra. He won an All-Ireland Senior Club Football Championship with Salthill–Knocknacarra in March 2006; he played at right half-forward.

Kerins played his club hurling with Clarinbridge. He won an All-Ireland Senior Club Hurling Championship with Clarinbridge in 2011.

=== Inter-county ===
Kerins won an All-Ireland Senior Football Championship medal with Galway in 2001. He was named AIB Connacht Footballer of the Year in 2005.

He played senior inter-county hurling for Galway between 1997 and 2011.

== Coaching career ==
In September 2019, he took up a performance and coaching role with the Westmeath senior hurlers.

== Other activities ==
Kerins is also performance consultant, executive coach, public speaker and chartered physiotherapist. He holds a diploma in Child and Family Support and has collaborated with UNESCO on several global development initiatives.

=== Inner Winner Institute ===
Kerins founded the Inner Winner Institute, a training company that offers leadership, personal and professional development courses in USA, Africa, India and Ireland.

=== Charity work ===
Kerins founded The Alan Kerins Projects in 2005, raising 20 million directly and several more million euro indirectly for many vital and life-saving projects and programmes for communities all over the world.

Taking three months unpaid leave from his job in the mid-2000s, Kerins started working on an outreach programme with the Presentation Sisters at the Cheshire Home in Mongu, the main township of Western Province in Zambia. The project was called the Alan Kerins Zambia Fund.

In the 2010s, the Alan Kerins Projects partnered with Self Help Africa. Self Help Africa supports rural poor communities across sub-Saharan Africa to grow and earn more from their small farms.

=== Warriors for Humanity ===
Kerins founded a global citizen movement called Warriors for Humanity a platform that creates a cultural and societal legacy by facilitating and supporting citizens to make a real and meaningful difference and leave truly lasting legacies.

=== Plant the Planet Games ===
Kerins founded Plant the Planet Games, which saw the first inter-county GAA match played in Kenya, in November 2022. The players raised €10,000 each, and reached their target of raising enough money to plant one million trees across several African countries.

=== Legacy Forest ===
Kerins founded Legact Forest Legacy Letters in 2023 where he hopes to plant millions of trees in countries all over the world and to honor the legacies of their citizens. The trees planted will have a Significant impact on the environment while also helping to create self-sustaining communities.

== Personal life ==
Kerins is married. He and his wife have two sons and one daughter. Kerins addressed the crowd at Croke Park during the World Meeting of Families 2018. He told the crowd of how his spirituality, family, community and friends had sustained him and his wife when their son Ruadhan was critically ill.

== Awards and honours ==
=== Inter-county ===
- 1 All-Ireland Senior Football Championship (2001)
- 1 All-Ireland Under-21 Hurling Championship (1996)
- 1 All-Ireland Minor Hurling Championship (1994)

=== Club ===
- 1 All-Ireland Senior Club Football Championship (2006)
- 1 All-Ireland Senior Club Hurling Championship (2011)

=== Individual ===
- AIB Connacht Footballer of the Year (2005)

In addition, Kerins has received many awards & acknowledgements for his work in Africa, Asia and Haiti. In 2006, Kerins received an ESB Rehab People of the Year Award and Galway Person of the Year Award, while he was also awarded Ireland's most outstanding young person.
