= Cathal Moore =

Irish hurler

Personal information
- Native name: Cathal Ó Mórdha (Irish)
- Born: 26 July 1975 (age 51) Galway, Ireland
- Occupation: Secondary school principal
- Height: 6 ft 2 in (188 cm)

Sport
- Sport: Hurling
- Position: Centre-back
Club
- Years: Club
- Turloughmore
Club titles
- Galway titles: 0
Inter-county
Years	County	Apps (scores)
1995-2003	Galway	15 (1-08)
Inter-county titles
- Connacht titles: 3
- All-Irelands: 0
- NHL: 2

Cathal Moore (born 26 July 1975) is an Irish sportsperson. He played hurling with his local club Turloughmore and was a member of the Galway senior inter-county team from the 1990s until the 2000s where he played centre-forward and centre-back. Moore currently works as a hurling analyst with TG4 and is principal in Presentation College, Athenry.
