= Kevin Broderick =

Irish hurler

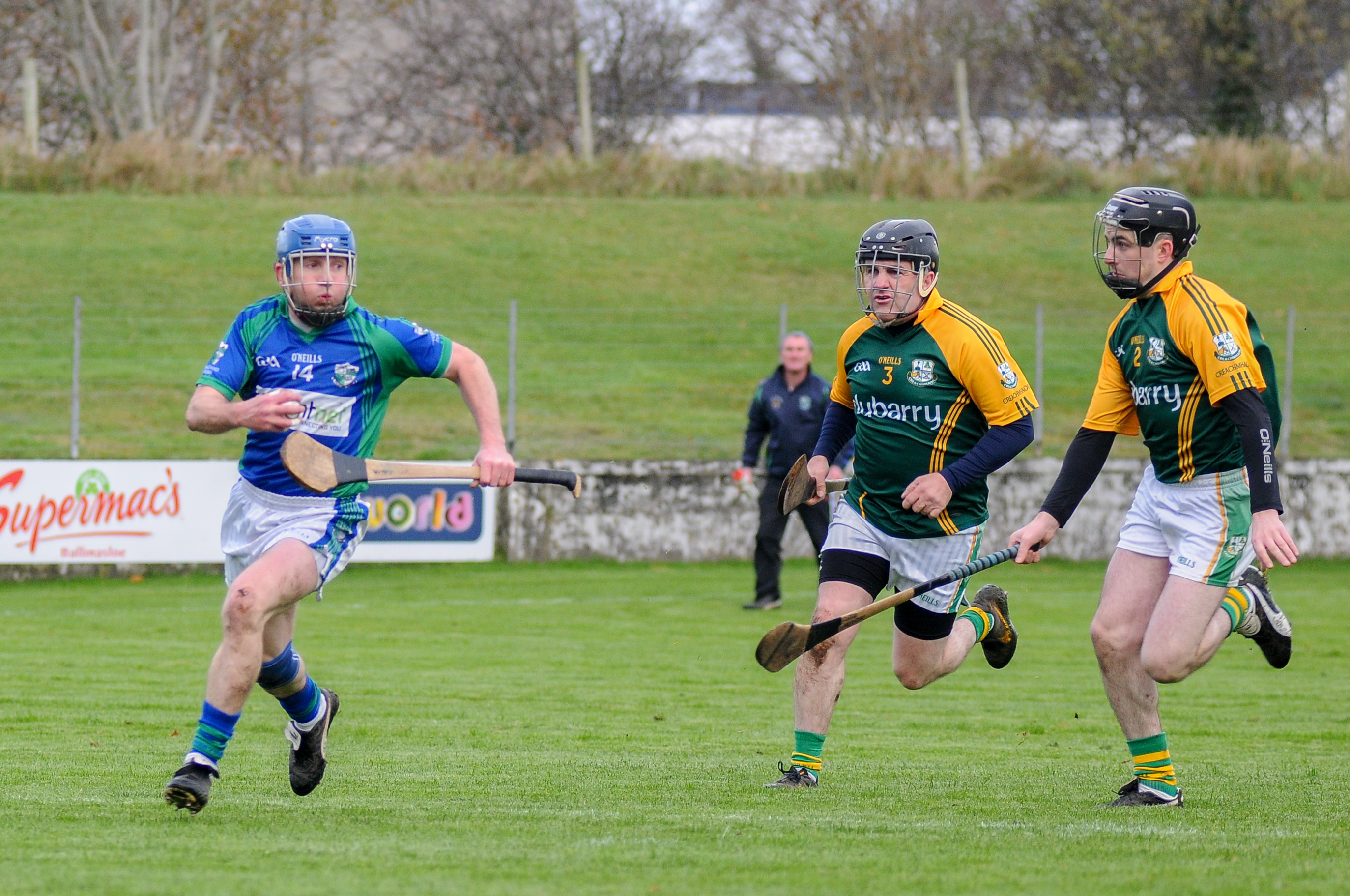
- Kevin Broderick (first from left) in 2015

Personal information
- Native name: Caoimhín Ó Bruadau (Irish)
- Born: 20 May 1977 (age 49) Duniry, County Galway

Sport
- Sport: Hurling
- Position: Wing Forward
Clubs
- Years: Club
- 1990s-2004 2004–2015: Abbey/Duniry; Tynagh-Abbey/Duniry
Inter-county
Years	County	Apps (scores)
1996–2007	Galway	? (10-40)
Inter-county titles
- Connacht titles: 4
- All-Irelands: 0
- NHL: 2
- All Stars: 2

Kevin Broderick (born 20 May 1977) is an Irish hurler. He plays for his local club Tynagh-Abbey/Duniry and with the Galway senior inter-county team.
