= Joe Rabbitte =

Irish hurler

Personal information
- Native name: Seosamh Ó Coinín (Irish)
- Born: 22 April 1970 (age 56) Athenry, County Galway, Ireland
- Height: 6 ft 4 in (193 cm)

Sport
- Sport: Hurling
- Position: Full-forward
Club
- Years: Club
- 1987-2007: Athenry
Club titles
- Galway titles: 8
- Connacht titles: 8
- All-Ireland Titles: 3
Inter-county
Years	County	Apps (scores)
1990-2002	Galway	25 (2-28)
Inter-county titles
- Connacht titles: 5
- All-Irelands: 0
- NHL: 2
- All Stars: 2

Joe Rabbitte (born 22 April 1970) is an Irish former hurler. He played for his local club Athenry, and was a member of the Galway senior hurling team from 1990 until 2002.

Rabbitte won his second GAA All-Stars Award in 2000.

Achievements
Preceded by Liam Hassett (St. Joseph's Doora-Barefield)	All-Ireland Club Hurling Final winning captain 2000; 2001	Succeeded by Simon Whelahan (Birr)
