= Ollie Canning =

Irish hurler

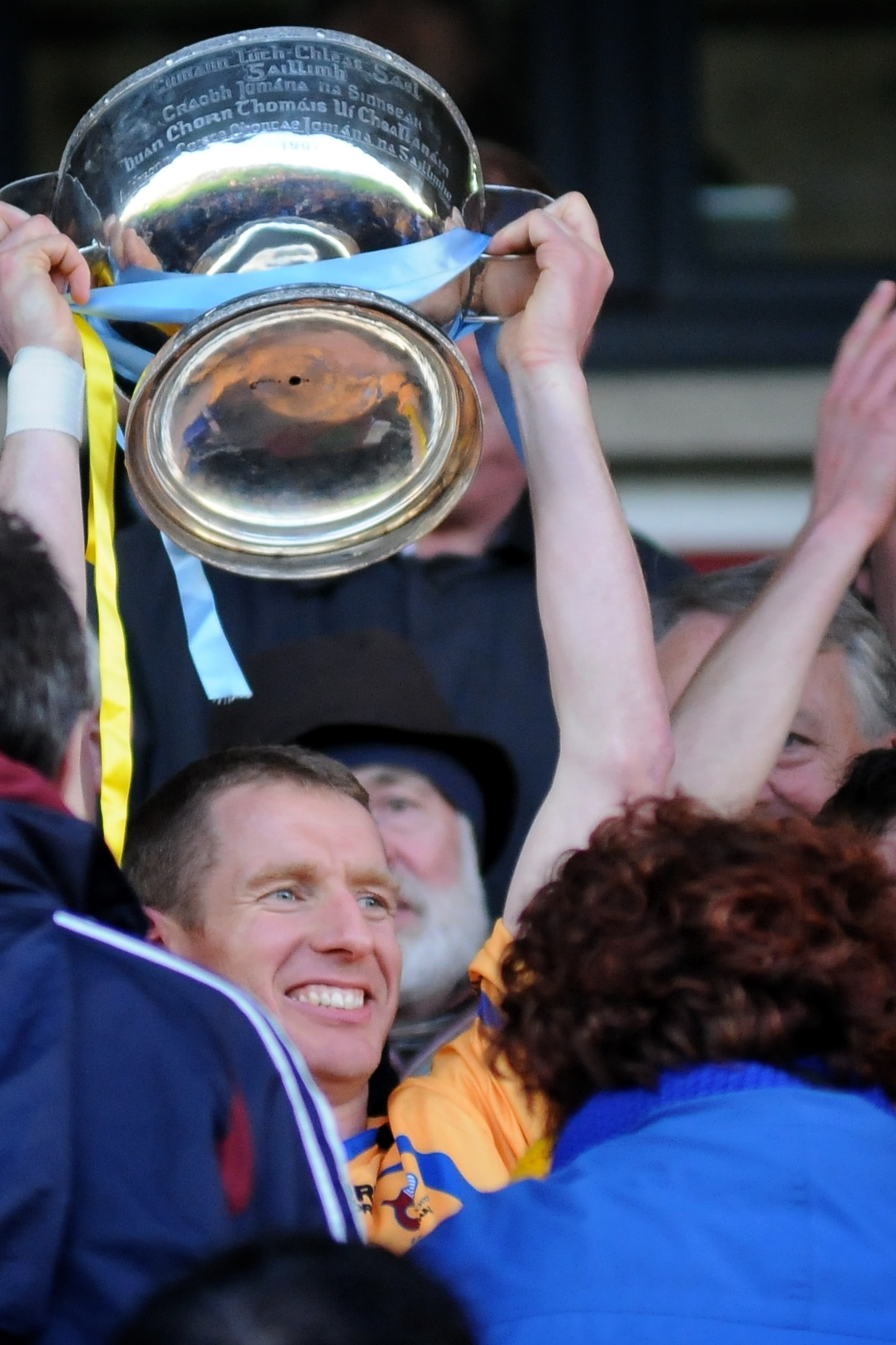
- Canning holding the 2013 Galway Senior Hurling Championship trophy on behalf of Portumna at Pearse Stadium, Galway

Personal information
- Native name: Oilibhéar Ó Cainín (Irish)
- Born: 9 July 1976 (age 50) Ballinasloe, Ireland
- Height: 1.75 m (5 ft 9 in)

Sport
- Sport: Hurling
- Position: Left Corner Back
Club
- Years: Club
- 1992–2019: Portumna
Club titles
- Galway titles: 6
- Connacht titles: 3
- All-Ireland Titles: 4
Inter-county*
| Years | County | Apps (scores) |
| 1996–2010 | Galway | 34 (1–5) |
Inter-county titles
- Connacht titles: 3
- All-Irelands: 0
- NHL: 4
- All Stars: 4
- *Inter County team apps and scores correct as of 23:04, 17 March 2014.

Oliver Canning (born 9 July 1976) is an Irish retired hurler who played as a left corner-back for the Galway senior team.

Born in Ballinasloe, County Galway, Canning first arrived on the inter-county scene at the age of fourteen when he first linked up with the Galway minor team, before later joining the under-21 team. He made his senior debut during the 1996 championship. Canning went on to play a key role for Galway for the next fifteen years, and won three Connacht medals and four National Hurling League medals. He was an All-Ireland runner-up on two occasions.

As a member of the Connacht inter-provincial team at various times throughout his career, Canning won two Railway Cup medals. At club level he is a four-time All-Ireland medallist with Portumna. In addition to this he has also won three Connacht medals and six championship medals.

Throughout his career Canning made 34 championship appearances for Galway. His announced his retirement from inter-county hurling on 27 July 2010.

== Early and private life ==
Ollie Canning was born in Ballinasloe, County Galway in 1976. He was educated locally and from an early age he showed a great interest in hurling. Canning later attended the Dublin Institute of Technology (DIT) where he studied mechanical engineering. Here he played on the college hurling team, winning a Fitzgibbon Cup title in the mid-1990s. Canning currently works as a Business Development Manager with Kirby Group Engineering in Galway. Ollie is an elder brother of 2017 Hurler of the year and former hurler Joe Canning.

== Playing career ==
=== Club ===
Canning plays his club hurling with his local Portumna team. He enjoyed some success at underage level and won a senior county championship medal in 2003. It was the club's first county triumph. This was later converted into a Connacht club hurling title. Two years later in 2005 Canning won his second county championship title before once again claiming a provincial club medal. On St. Patrick's Day, 2006 Portumna defeated Newstownshandrum to win the All-Ireland club final. A third set of county and provincial medals followed in 2007 and he received the Tommy Moore cup as captain of the club side when they were successful again in the All-Ireland club championship of 2008. Portumna defeated Offaly champions Birr on that occasion.

=== Inter-county ===
In the early 1990s Canning's hurling talent was spotted and he quickly joined the Galway minor hurling panel. He played in the All-Ireland minor final in 1993, however, Galway were defeated on that occasion by Kilkenny. The following year Canning's side bounced back and defeated Cork to capture the All-Ireland title. Two years later Canning was a member of the GAlway under-21 panel as the county captured the All-Ireland title in that grade.

That same year Canning earned a call up to the Galway senior team. He was a member of the panel as the county won the National Hurling League. Later that summer he made his senior championship debut as a substitute against Wexford in the All-Ireland semi-final. Canning played as a forward for a number of years before moving to the corner-back position in 2000. That year he won his first National League medal on the field of play. In 2001 Galway reached the All-Ireland final for the first time in eight years. Tipperary provided the opposition on that occasion, however, Galway were unable to withstand the Tipp attack and lost the game by three points. In spite of this Canning's performance in the championship earned him his first All-Star award. Galway's hurlers faced a lean period following this, however, Canning's performances earned him a second All-Star award in 2003. Two years later in 2005 Galway were back on top. The team defeated Kilkenny in a thrilling All-Ireland semi-final before later meeting Cork in the All-Ireland final. Unfortunately Canning ended up on the losing side in an All-Ireland final for the second time, however, he did win a third All-Star award. Following Galway's exit from the 2006 championship Canning decided to retire from inter-county hurling.

In the 2008 National League Canning's brother, Joe, made his long-awaited senior debut. Shortly after this Ollie Canning announced that he was coming out of retirement to rejoin the Galway senior hurling team. He captained the Galway team in 2008 and 2009, and won a fourth All Star in 2009.

In July 2010, following Galway's elimination from the All Ireland Championship with a defeat to Tipperary, Canning retired from inter-county hurling but continues to line out for his club Portumna.

=== Inter-provincial ===
Canning also lined out for Connacht in the inter-provincial hurling competition. He captured two Railway Cup medals in 1999 and 2004.

== Media work ==
Canning has worked as an analyst for Sky Sports.

Sporting positions
| Preceded by Liam Hodgins | Galway Senior Hurling Captain; 2004 | Succeeded by Liam Donoghue |
| Preceded by David Collins | Galway Senior Hurling Captain; 2008-2009 | Succeeded by Shane Kavanagh |
Achievements
| Preceded by Tom Coogan | All-Ireland Senior Club Hurling Final winning captain 2008-2009 | Succeeded by Eamon Walsh |
| Preceded by Robert Murray | All-Ireland Senior Club Hurling Final winning captain 2014 | Succeeded by T. J. Reid |
