= List of All-Ireland Senior Hurling Championship scorers by season =

== 2003 ==
Rank	Player	County	Tally	Total	Matches	Average
1	Joe Deane	Cork	4-29	41	5	8.20
2	Brian McFall	Antrim	5-25	40	4	10.00
2	Paul Codd	Wexford	2-34	40	6	6.67
4	Paul Flynn	Waterford	6-19	37	5	7.40
5	Tomás McGrane	Dublin	2-30	36	5	7.20
5	Eoin Kelly	Tipperary	2-30	36	5	7.20
7	James Young	Laois	0-35	35	5	7.00
8	Henry Shefflin	Kilkenny	3-25	34	4	8.50
9	Mike Slattery	Kerry	3-23	32	5	6.40
10	Ollie Collins	Derry	0-28	28	3	9.33

== 2004 ==
Rank	Player	County	Tally	Total	Matches	Average
1	Henry Shefflin	Kilkenny	6-45	63	7	9.00
2	Joe Deane	Cork	1-36	39	7	5.57
3	Eugene Cloonan	Galway	4-14	26	2	13.00
3	Eoin Kelly	Tipperary	2-20	26	3	8.66
5	Paul Flynn	Waterford	1-22	25	4	6.25

== 2005 ==
Rank	Player	County	Tally	Total	Matches	Average
1	Ger Farragher	Galway	3-57	66	6	11.00
2	James Young	Laois	2-53	59	7	8.43
3	Henry Shefflin	Kilkenny	3-37	46	4	11.50
4	T. J. Ryan	Limerick	3-36	45	6	7.50
5	Martin Coulter	Down	6-20	38	4	9.50
5	Eoin Kelly	Tipperary	1-35	38	5	7.60
7	Paul Flynn	Waterford	3-26	35	5	7.00
8	Niall Gilligan	Clare	0-33	33	6	5.50
9	Bran Carroll	Offaly	1-29	32	5	6.40
10	Ben O'Connor	Cork	1-26	29	5	5.80

== 2006 ==
Rank	Player	County	Tally	Total	Matches	Average
1	Henry Shefflin	Kilkenny	2-47	53	5	10.60
2	Eoin Kelly	Tipperary	3-38	47	4	11.75
3	James Young	Laois	1-33	36	4	9.00
4	Niall Gilligan	Clare	3-26	35	6	5.83
5	David Curtin	Dublin	0-34	34	5	6.80
6	Joe Deane	Cork	0-32	32	5	6.40
7	Andrew Mitchell	Westmeath	0-30	30	6	5.00
8	Dave Bennett	Waterford	0-27	27	5	5.40

== 2007 ==
Rank	Player	County	Tally	Total	Matches	Average
1	Andrew O'Shaughnessy	Limerick	2-46	52	7	7.42
2	Henry Shefflin	Kilkenny	1-45	48	5	9.60
3	Damien Murray	Offaly	3-38	47	5	9.40

== 2008 ==
Rank	Player	County	Tally	Total	Matches	Average
1	Eoin Kelly	Waterford	7-43	64	5	12.8
2	David O'Callaghan	Dublin	2-33	39	4	9.75
2	Joe Canning	Galway	4-27	39	3	13.0
4	Henry Shefflin	Kilkenny	1-35	38	4	9.5
5	Brian Carroll	Offaly	0-37	37	4	9.25
6	Ben O'Connor	Cork	1-32	35	5	7.0
7	Martin Finn	London	1-29	32	3	10.67
8	John Mullane	Waterford	2-21	27	5	5.4
10	Eddie Brennan	Kilkenny	4-12	24	4	6.0
10	Niall Gilligan	Clare	1-21	24	4	6.0

== 2009 ==
Rank	Player	County	Tally	Total	Matches	Average
1	Joe Canning	Galway	3-46	55	5	11.00
2	Eoin Kelly	Waterford	2-46	52	5	10.40
3	Henry Shefflin	Kilkenny	2-38	44	4	11.00
4	Alan McCrabbe	Dublin	1-39	42	4	10.50
5	Eoin Kelly	Tipperary	2-30	36	5	7.20
6	Diarmuid Lyng	Wexford	1-31	34	4	8.50
7	Lar Corbett	Tipperary	6-11	29	5	5.80
8	Niall Healy	Galway	5-9	24	5	4.80
9	Ben O'Connor	Cork	0-24	24	3	8.00
10	Andrew O'Shaughnessy	Limerick	1-20	23	6	3.83

== 2010 ==
Rank	Player	County	Tally	Total	Matches	Average
1	Eoin Kelly	Tipperary	3-44	53	6	8.83
2	Shane Dooley	Offaly	3-39	48	5	9.60
3	Ben O'Connor	Cork	1-34	37	6	6.14
4	Ger Farragher	Galway	1-30	33	5	6.60
5	Eoin Kelly	Waterford	1-27	30	4	7.50
6	Joe Canning	Galway	4-18	30	5	6.00
7	Richie Power	Kilkenny	3-20	29	4	7.25
7	Lar Corbett	Tipperary	6-11	29	6	4.83
7	Neil McManus	Antrim	1-26	29	4	7.25
10	Alan McCrabbe	Dublin	0-28	28	4	7.00

== 2011 ==
Rank	Player	County	Tally	Total	Matches	Average
1	Paul Ryan	Dublin	2-47	53	5	10.60
2	Patrick Horgan	Cork	3-38	47	4	11.75
3	Eoin Kelly	Tipperary	4-30	42	5	8.40
3	Neil McManus	Antrim	0-42	42	5	8.40
5	Joe Canning	Galway	3-31	40	5	7.40
6	Henry Shefflin	Kilkenny	1-32	35	4	8.75
7	Lar Corbett	Tipperary	7-9	30	4	7.50
8	Shane Dooley	Offaly	2-22	28	2	14.00
8	Declan Hannon	Limerick	0-28	28	3	9.33
10	Pauric Mahony	Waterford	0-27	27	3	9.00

== 2012 ==
Rank	Player	County	Tally	Total	Matches	Average
1	Henry Shefflin	Kilkenny	3–56	65	6	10.83
2	Joe Canning	Galway	2–50	56	5	11.20
3	Shane Dowling	Limerick	4–37	49	5	9.80
4	Patrick Horgan	Cork	1–42	45	5	9.00
5	Pa Bourke	Tipperary	2–30	36	4	9.00
6	Shane Dooley	Offaly	4–21	33	3	11.00
7	Willie Hyland	Laois	1–26	29	3	9.66
8	Diarmuid Lyng	Wexford	1–25	28	4	7.00
9	Niall O'Brien	Westmeath	2–20	26	3	8.66
10	Maurice Shanahan	Waterford	0–24	24	3	8.00

== 2013 ==
Rank	Player	County	Tally	Total	Matches	Average
1	Colin Ryan	Clare	0-70	70	8	8.75
2	Patrick Horgan	Cork	1-49	52	6	8.7
3	Eoin Larkin	Kilkenny	0-50	50	6	8.33
4	Jack Guiney	Wexford	2-39	45	5	9.00
5	Paul Ryan	Dublin	3-32	41	6	6.83
6	Maurice Shanahan	Waterford	1-29	32	4	8.00
7	Joe Canning	Galway	1-25	28	3	9.33
8	Tony Kenny	Galway	0-22	22	8	2.75
8	Derek McNicholas	Westmeath	0-22	22	3	7.33
10	Neil McManus	Antrim	2-15	21	3	7.0001
