= Waterford county hurling team records and statistics =

Waterford county hurling team records

The following is a list of All-Ireland Senior Hurling Championship matches in which Waterford has competed from the 1989 Championship to present.

All-Ireland Senior Hurling Championship 1987
#	Date	Venue	Opponent	Result	Competition	Match report
	24/05/1987	Semple Stadium, Thurles	Limerick	1-14 : 2–15	Munster Quarter-Final	Irish Times
All-Ireland Senior Hurling Championship 1988
#	Date	Venue	Opponent	Result	Competition	Match report
	22/05/1988	Semple Stadium, Thurles	Clare	3-10 : 3–12	Munster Quarter-Final	Irish Times
All-Ireland Senior Hurling Championship 1989
#	Date	Venue	Opponent	Result	Competition	Match report
	22/05/1989	Semple Stadium, Thurles	Clare	5-13 : 1–10	Munster Quarter-Final	Irish Times
	04/06/1989	Semple Stadium, Thurles	Cork	0-18 : 0–18	Munster Semi-Final	Irish Times
	18/06/1989	Semple Stadium, Thurles	Cork	5-16 : 4–17	Munster Semi-Final Replay	Irish Times
	02/06/1989	Páirc Uí Chaoimh, Cork	Tipperary	2-08 : 0-26	Munster Final	Irish Times
All-Ireland Senior Hurling Championship 1990
#	Date	Venue	Opponent	Result	Competition	Match report
	03/06/1990	Semple Stadium, Thurles	Cork	1-08 : 4–15	Munster Semi-Final	Irish Times
All-Ireland Senior Hurling Championship 1991
#	Date	Venue	Opponent	Result	Competition	Match report
	19/05/1991	Walsh Park, Waterford	Kerry	2-15 : 1–12	Munster Quarter-Final
	02/06/1991	Semple Stadium, Thurles	Cork	0-13 : 2–10	Munster Semi-Final	Irish Times
All-Ireland Senior Hurling Championship 1992
#	Date	Venue	Opponent	Result	Competition	Match report
	31/05/1992	Semple Stadium, Thurles	Clare	2-13 : 3–10	Munster Quarter-Final	Irish Times
	24/05/1992	Semple Stadium, Thurles	Clare	0-16 : 0–14	Munster Quarter-Final Replay	Irish Times
	14/06/1992	Semple Stadium, Thurles	Limerick	1-13 : 2–13	Munster Semi-Final	Irish Times
All-Ireland Senior Hurling Championship 1993
#	Date	Venue	Opponent	Result	Competition	Match report
	23/05/1993	Walsh Park, Waterford	Kerry	3-13 : 4–13	Munster Quarter-Final	Irish Times
All-Ireland Senior Hurling Championship 1994
#	Date	Venue	Opponent	Result	Competition	Match report
	19/06/1994	Semple Stadium, Thurles	Limerick	2-12 : 2–14	Munster Semi-Final	Irish Times
All-Ireland Senior Hurling Championship 1995
#	Date	Venue	Opponent	Result	Competition	Match report
	21/05/1995	Páirc Uí Chaoimh, Cork	Tipperary	1-11 : 4-23	Munster Quarter-Final	Irish Times
All-Ireland Senior Hurling Championship 1996
#	Date	Venue	Opponent	Result	Competition	Match report
	02/06/1996	Walsh Park, Waterford	Tipperary	1-14 : 1–11	Munster Quarter-Final	Irish Times
All-Ireland Senior Hurling Championship 1997
#	Date	Venue	Opponent	Result	Competition	Match report
	25/05/1997	Semple Stadium, Thurles	Limerick	1-17 : 2-20	Munster Quarter-Final	Irish Times
All-Ireland Senior Hurling Championship 1998
#	Date	Venue	Opponent	Result	Competition	Match report
	24/05/1998	Austin Stack Park, Tralee	Kerry	0-20 : 1-09	Munster Quarter-Final	Irish Independent
	07/06/1998	Páirc Uí Chaoimh, Cork	Tipperary	0-21 : 2–12	Munster Semi-Final	Irish Independent
	12/07/1998	Semple Stadium, Thurles	Clare	3-10 : 1–16	Munster Final	Irish Independent
	19/07/1998	Semple Stadium, Thurles	Clare	0-10 : 2–16	Munster Final Replay	Irish Independent
	26/07/1998	Croke Park, Dublin	Galway	1-20 : 1–10	All-Ireland Quarter-Final	Irish Independent
	16/08/1998	Croke Park, Dublin	Kilkenny	1-10 : 1–11	All-Ireland Semi-Final	Irish Independent
All-Ireland Senior Hurling Championship 1999
#	Date	Venue	Opponent	Result	Competition	Match report
	30/05/1999	Semple Stadium, Thurles	Limerick	1-16 : 1–15	Munster Quarter-Final	Irish Examiner
	13/06/1999	Semple Stadium, Thurles	Cork	1-15 : 0-24	Munster Semi-Final	Irish Examiner
All-Ireland Senior Hurling Championship 2000
#	Date	Venue	Opponent	Result	Competition	Match report
	28/06/2000	Páirc Uí Chaoimh, Cork	Tipperary	0-14 : 0–17	Munster Quarter-Final	Irish Independent
All-Ireland Senior Hurling Championship 2001
#	Date	Venue	Opponent	Result	Competition	Match report
	10/06/2001	Páirc Uí Chaoimh, Cork	Limerick	2-14 : 4–11	Munster Semi-Final	Irish Independent
All-Ireland Senior Hurling Championship 2002
#	Date	Venue	Opponent	Result	Competition	Match report
	26/05/2002	Semple Stadium, Thurles	Cork	1-16 : 1–15	Munster Semi-Final	Irish Independent
	30/06/2002	Páirc Uí Chaoimh, Thurles	Tipperary	2-23 : 3–12	Munster Final	Irish Examiner
	11/08/2002	Croke Park, Dublin	Clare	1-13 : 1–16	All-Ireland Semi-Final	Irish Independent
All-Ireland Senior Hurling Championship 2003
#	Date	Venue	Opponent	Result	Competition	Match report
	11/05/2003	Walsh Park, Waterford	Kerry	2-26 : 1–12	Munster Quarter-Final	Anfearrua
	01/06/2003	Semple Stadium, Thurles	Limerick	4-13 : 4–13	Munster Semi-Final	Irish Examiner
	08/06/2003	Semple Stadium, Thurles	Limerick	1-12 : 0–13	Munster Semi-Final Replay	Irish Examiner
	29/06/2003	Semple Stadium, Thurles	Cork	3-12 : 3–16	Munster Final	Irish Examiner
	20/07/2003	Nowlan Park, Kilkenny	Wexford	0-18 : 1-20	3rd round qualifier	Irish Independent
All-Ireland Senior Hurling Championship 2004
#	Date	Venue	Opponent	Result	Competition	Match report
	16/05/2004	Semple Stadium, Thurles	Clare	3-21 : 1–8	Munster Quarter-Final	Irish Examiner
	06/06/2004	Páirc Uí Chaoimh, Cork	Tipperary	4-10 : 3–12	Munster Semi-Final	Irish Examiner
	27/06/2004	Semple Stadium, Thurles	Cork	3-16 : 1-21	Munster Final	Irish Examiner
	08/08/2004	Croke Park, Dublin	Kilkenny	3-12 : 0–18	All-Ireland Semi-Final	Irish Independent
All-Ireland Senior Hurling Championship 2005
#	Date	Venue	Opponent	Result	Competition	Match report
	22/05/2005	Semple Stadium, Thurles	Cork	2-15 : 2–17	Munster Semi-Final	Irish Examiner
	18/06/2005	Dr. Cullen Park, Carlow	Offaly	1-26 : 1–15	Group Stage Qualifier	Irish Independent
	02/07/2005	Walsh Park, Waterford	Dublin	4-17 : 1–3	Group Stage Qualifier	Irish Independent
	09/07/2005	Cusack Park, Ennis	Clare	0-21 : 4–14	Group Stage Qualifier	Irish Independent
	24/07/2005	Croke Park, Dublin	Cork	1-13 : 1–18	All-Ireland Quarter-Final	Irish Examiner
All-Ireland Senior Hurling Championship 2006
#	Date	Venue	Opponent	Result	Competition	Match report
	04/06/2006	Páirc Uí Chaoimh, Cork	Tipperary	1-12 : 3–14	Munster Semi-Final	RTE Sport
	18/06/2006	Cusack Park, Mullingar	Westmeath	3-22 : 1–14	Group Stage Qualifier	Irish Independent
	02/07/2006	Walsh Park, Waterford	Galway	1-25 : 2-20	Group Stage Qualifier	RTE Sport
	08/07/2006	O'Moore Park, Portlaoise	Laois	2-17 : 1–13	Group Stage Qualifier	Irish Independent
	23/07/2006	Croke Park, Dublin	Tipperary	1-22 : 3–13	All-Ireland Quarter-Final	RTE Sport
	06/08/2006	Croke Park, Dublin	Cork	1-15 : 1–16	All-Ireland Semi-Final	RTE Sport
All-Ireland Senior Hurling Championship 2007
#	Date	Venue	Opponent	Result	Competition	Match report
	17/06/2007	Semple Stadium, Thurles	Cork	5-15 : 3–18	Munster Semi-Final	Irish Independent
	08/07/2007	Semple Stadium, Thurles	Limerick	3-17 : 1–14	Munster Final	Irish Independent
	29/07/2007	Croke Park, Dublin	Cork	3-16 : 3–16	All-Ireland Quarter-Final	Irish Independent
	05/08/2007	Croke Park, Dublin	Cork	2-17 : 0-20	All-Ireland Quarter-Final Replay	Irish Independent
	12/08/2007	Croke Park, Dublin	Limerick	2-15 : 5–11	All-Ireland Semi-Final	Irish Independent
All-Ireland Senior Hurling Championship 2008
#	Date	Venue	Opponent	Result	Competition	Match report
	01/06/2008	Gaelic Grounds, Limerick	Clare	0-23 : 2-26	Munster Quarter-Final	Irish Examiner
	05/07/2008	Walsh Park, Waterford	Antrim	6-18 : 0–15	2nd round qualifier	Irish Independent
	19/07/2008	Semple Stadium, Thurles	Offaly	2-18 : 0–18	4th round qualifier	Irish Independent
	27/07/2008	Semple Stadium, Thurles	Wexford	2-19 : 3–15	All-Ireland Quarter-Final	RTE Sport
	17/08/2008	Croke Park, Dublin	Tipperary	1-20 : 1–18	All-Ireland Semi-Final	RTE Sport
All-Ireland Senior Hurling Championship 2009
#	Date	Venue	Opponent	Result	Competition	Match report
	14 June 2009	Semple Stadium, Thurles	Limerick	0-11 : 1-08	Munster Semi-Final	RTE Sport
	20 June 2009	Semple Stadium, Thurles	Limerick	0-25 : 0–17	Munster Semi-Final Replay	RTE Sport
	12/07/2009	Semple Stadium, Thurles	Tipperary	2-16 : 4–14	Munster Final	RTE Sport
