= 2008 National Hurling League =

77th season of the National Hurling League

League details
- Dates: 10 February – 20 April 2008
- Teams: 34

League champions
- Winners: Tipperary (19th win)
- Captain: Eoin Kelly
- Manager: Liam Sheedy

League runners-up
- Runners-up: Galway
- Captain: Ollie Canning
- Manager: Ger Loughnane

Other division winners
- Division 2: Westmeath
- Division 3: Louth
- Division 4: Monaghan

The 2008 National Hurling League, known for sponsorship reasons as the Allianz National Hurling League, was the 77th edition of the National Hurling League (NHL), an annual hurling competition for the GAA county teams. Tipperary won the league, beating Galway in the final. The tournament saw the first appearance of Fingal and South Down as "county" teams in the NHL.

== Format ==
The 2008 format of the National Hurling League was a new system consisting of four divisions. There are thirty-four teams competing: Divisions One and Two have twelve teams in each, and there are five teams in Divisions Three and Four.

=== Division One ===
Division One is made up of two groups of six teams. Each team plays all the others in their group once. The two group winners receive a semi-final spot; second and third in each group play in the quarter-finals. The winners of the final are the 2008 NHL champions.

=== Division Two ===
Division Two is made up of two groups of six teams. Each team plays all the others in their group once. The top two in each group enter the semi-finals.

=== Division Three ===
Five teams play in Division Three. Each team plays all the others once. The top two teams contest the Division Three final.

=== Division Four ===
Five teams play in Division Four. Each team plays all the others once. The top two teams contest the Division Four final.

Promotion and relegation for 2008
	Promoted	Relegated
Division 1	-	4
Division 2	0	8
Division 3	0	1
Division 4	0	-

== Division 1A ==
National Hurling League Division 1
- Season: 2008
- Champions: Tipperary; 19th National League title Captain: Eoin Kelly; Manager: Liam Sheedy
- Matches: 36
- Top goalscorer: Ger Farragher (4-53)
- Best goalkeeper: Brendan Cummins; James Skehill (3 clean sheets)
- Biggest home win: Kilkenny 3-22 - 1-8 Antrim (23 March 2008)
- Biggest away win: Laois 0-8 - 6-26 Galway (16 March 2008)
- Highest scoring: Waterford 3-29 - 3-10 Antrim (9 March 2008)
- All statistics correct as of 19 February 2016.

Waterford came into the season as defending champions of the 2007 season. Laois entered Division 1 as the promoted team.

On 20 April 2008, Tipperary won the title after a 3-18 to 3-16 win over Galway. It was their first league title since 2001 and their 19th National League title overall.

Wexford, Antrim, Laois and Offaly were the bottom-placed teams of their respective groups and were relegated to a newly-structured Division 2 for the 2009 league.

Galway's Ger Farragher was the Division 1 top scorer with 4-53. Tipperary's Brendan Cummins and Galway's James Skehill were the top goalkeepers having kept 3 clean sheets.

=== Structure ===
A total of 12 teams contested the top division of the league, including 11 sides from the 2006 season and one promoted from the 2006 National League Division 2. On 29 April 2007, Laois earned promotion from the 2007 National League Division 2 after a one-year absence from the top flight. They were crowned Division 2 champions after beating Wicklow. They replaced Down who were relegated to Division 2 at the end of the previous season.

The 12 teams in Division 1 were divided into two groups of six team - 1A and 1B. Each team played all the others in its group once, earning 2 points for a win and 1 for a draw. The first-placed teams in 1A and 1B advanced to the league semi-finals. The second and third-placed teams in 1A and 1B advanced to the league quarter-finals.

=== Division 1A table ===
Pos	Team	Pld	W	D	L	Diff	Pts	Notes
1	Kilkenny	5	5	0	0	+54	10	
2	Cork	5	3	0	2	+24	6	
3	Waterford	5	3	0	2	+14	6	
4	Dublin	5	1	1	3	–13	3	
5	Wexford	5	1	1	3	–23	3	Relegated to Division 2
6	Antrim	5	1	0	4	–56	2	Relegated to Division 2

Group stage

10 February 2008 Round 1	Waterford	3-8 - 2-12	Wexford	Walsh Park
	S Casey 1-1, D Shanahan 1-1, E Kelly 1-1, J Mullane 0-2, S Walsh 0-1, S O'Sullivan 0-1, S Prendergast 0-1.		S Nolan 1-3, E Quigley 1-2, R Jacob 0-4, R Kehoe 0-1, J O'Connor 0-1, J Breen 0-1.	Referee: J Sexton (Cork)

10 February 2008 Round 1	Dublin	0-22 - 0-15	Antrim	Parnell Park
	S Mullen 0-12, D O'Callaghan 0-3, D Qualter 0-2, R O'Carroll 0-2, K Flynn 0-1, J Boland 0-1, P O'Driscoll 0-1.		L Watson 0-9, N McManus 0-3, E McCloskey 0-1, P McGill 0-1, S McCrory 0-1.	Referee: J McGrath (Westmeath)

10 February 2008 Round 1	Kilkenny	w/o - scr.	Cork

17 February 2008 Round 2	Antrim	3-11 - 1-10	Wexford	Pearse Park
	K Stewart 2-0, L Watson 0-6, C Herron 1-0, N McManus 0-1, D McNaughton 0-1, B Quinn 0-1, P McGill 0-1, S McCrory 0-1.	Report	E Quigley 1-2, S Nolan 0-4, M Jacob 0-2, D O'Connor 0-1, PJ Nolan 0-1.	Referee: B Sweeney (Cavan)

17 February 2008 Round 2	Kilkenny	1-21 - 2-10	Dublin	Nowlan Park
	E Brennan 0-6, R Hogan 1-2, R Power 0-3, J Fitzpatrick 0-2, W O'Dwyer 0-2, A Fogarty 0-2, E Reid 0-2, TJ Reid 0-1, M Comerford 0-1,		S Mullen 0-6, K Flynn 1-1, P Carton 1-0, J McCaffrey 0-1, S Lambert 0-1, R O'Carroll 0-1.	Referee: B Gavin (Offaly)

17 February 2008 Round 2	Waterford	w/o - scr.	Cork

9 March 2008 Round 3	Waterford	3-29 - 3-10	Antrim	Fraher Field
	E Kelly 1-6, D Shanahan 2-2, S Prendergast 0-6, K McGrath 0-4, M Walsh 0-3, S Walsh 0-3, D Prendergast 0-2, E McGrath 0-2, J Mullane 0-1.		L Watson 0-5, P Richmond 1-1, S McCrory 1-0, K Stewart 1-0, P McGill 0-1, D McNaughton 0-1, C Donnelly 0-1, B Quinn 0-1.

9 March 2008 Round 3	Dublin	2-16 - 3-18	Cork	Parnell Park
	S Mullen 0-7, D O'Callaghan 0-5, K Flynn 1-0, P Kelly 1-0, D O'Dwyer 0-2, R O'Carroll 0-1, J McCaffrey 0-1.		N Ronan 2-4, F O'Leary 1-0, T Kenny 0-3, J Gardiner 0-3, P Horgan 0-2, P Cronin 0-2, B Corry 0-2, T McCarthy 0-1, K McGann 0-1.	Referee: S Whelan (Wexcford)

9 March 2008 Round 3	Wexford	1-5 - 0-23	Kilkenny	Wexford Park
	R Jacob 1-0, S Nolan 0-3, D Redmond 0-1, J O'Connor 0-1.		R Power 0-7, M Rice 0-4, E Brennan 0-4, A Fogarty 0-3, E Reid 0-3, M Comerford 0-2.	Referee: B Kelly (Westmeath)

16 March 2008 Round 4	Antrim	1-7 - 1-24	Cork	Casement Park
	L Watson 1-1, K McKeegan 0-2, P McGill 0-1, K Stewart 0-1, P Shiels 0-1, B Quinn 0-1.		P Cronin 0-6, K Canty 0-5, B Corry 1-0, B O'Connor 0-3, J Gardiner 0-3, T Kenny 0-2, C Naughton 0-2, T McCarthy 0-1, L Desmond 0-1, K Hackett 0-1.	Referee: T Stapleton (Laois)

16 March 2008 Round 4	Kilkenny	0-25 - 0-14	Waterford	Nowlan Park
	R Hogan 0-7, M Rice 0-4, M Comerford 0-4, A Fogarty 0-3, J Fitzpatrick 0-3, M Fennelly 0-2, E Brennan 0-2.		E Kelly 0-8, B Phelan 0-2, E McGrath 0-1, S Molumphy 0-1, D Prendergast 0-1, S O'Sullivan 0-1.	Referee: M Haverty (Galway)

16 March 2008 Round 4	Wexford	2-9 - 0-15	Dublin	Wexford Park
	S Nolan 1-4, C Farrell 1-0, R Jacob 0-3, D Redmond 0-2.		S Mullen 0-7, J McCaffrey 0-2, P Carton 0-2, D O'Callaghan 0-2, K Flynn 0-1, S Lambert 0-1.	Referee: D Connolly (Kilkenny)

23 March 2008 Round 5	Kilkenny	3-22 - 1-8	Antrim	Nowlan Park
	R Hogan 0-7, A Fogarty 1-3, D Fogarty 1-3, M Comerford 1-2, E Brennan 0-2, J Fitzpatrick 0-2, J Ryall 0-1, E Reid 0-1, TJ Reid 0-1.		L Watson 0-5, P Richmond 1-1, K Stewart 0-2.

23 March 2008 Round 5	Waterford	3-18 - 1-17	Dublin	Walsh Park
	J Mullane 3-4, E Kelly 0-9, S Prendergast 0-2, M Walsh 0-1, E McGrath 0-1, D Shanahan 0-1.		D O'Callaghan 0-8, D O'Dwyer 1-1, J McCaffrey 0-2, P Kelly 0-1, P Ryan 0-1, K Flynn 0-1, S Lambert 0-1, S Mullen 0-1, J Burke 0-1.	Referee: S McMahon (Clare)

23 March 2008 Round 5	Cork	0-22 - 1-17	Wexford	Páirc Uí Chaoimh
	N Ronan 0-10, C Naughton 0-3, J Gardiner 0-3, T McCarthy 0-2, S O'Neill 0-1, B Corry 0-1, P Horgan 0-1, K Canty 0-1.		R Jacob 1-4, S Nolan 0-4, D Stamp 0-3, PJ Nolan 0-2, C Farrell 0-1, T Dwyer 0-1, D Lyng 0-1, S Doyle 0-1.	Referee: G Hoey (Clare)

== Division 1B ==
=== Division 1B table ===
Pos	Team	Pld	W	D	L	Diff	Pts	Notes
1	Galway	5	3	2	0	+51	8	Division 1 runners-up
2	Tipperary	5	3	2	0	+42	8	Division 1 champions
3	Limerick	5	3	0	2	+16	6	
4	Clare	5	2	1	2	–1	5	
5	Laois	5	1	0	4	–74	2	Relegated to Division 2
6	Offaly	5	0	1	4	–34	1	Relegated to Division 2

Group stage

10 February 2008 Round 1	Limerick	3-23 - 2-11	Laois	Gaelic Grounds
	A O'Shaughnessy 2-6, P Tobin 1-7, O Moran 0-2, S O'Connor 0-2, P O'Dwyer 0-2, D O'Grady 0-1, K Tobin 0-1, M Fitzgerald 0-1, W McNamara 0-1.		J Young 0-5, W Hyland 1-0, J Brophy 1-0, Z Keenan 0-3, T Fitzgerald 0-2, P Russell 0-1.	Referee: M Wadding (Waterford)

10 February 2008 Round 1	Galway	2-24 - 3-17	Clare	Pearse Stadium
	G Farragher 1-11, A Cullinane 1-2, N Healy 0-3, I Tannian 0-5, A Callanan 0-2, K Hynes 0-1.		M Flaherty 3-8, N Gilligan 0-3, D O'Rourke 0-3, J Clancy 0-2, G Quinn 0-1.	Referee: S Roche (Tipperary)

10 February 2008 Round 1	Tipperary	2-25 - 2-8	Offaly	Semple Stadium
	E Kelly 1-10, P Kerwick 1-1, L Corbett 0-3, P Bourke 0-3, S Callinan 0-3, S Butler 0-2, R O'Dwyer 0-1, J O'Brien 0-1, W Ryan 0-1.		D Molloy 1-1, D Murray 1-0, S Dooley 0-3, J Rigney 0-2, B Carroll 0-1, C Mahon 0-1.	Referee: J Owens (Wexford)

17 February 2008 Round 2	Clare	1-25 - 1-15	Laois	Scariff GAA Ground
	M Flaherty 1-12, C Lynch 0-3, T Carmody 0-3, F Lynch 0-3, B Nugent 0-2, M Murphy 0-1, C Lafferty 0-1.		J Young 1-10, Z Keenan 0-2, W Hyland 0-1, J Brophy 0-1, T Fitzgerald 0-1.	Referee: M Haverty (Galway)

17 February 2008 Round 2	Offaly	3-9 - 0-18	Galway	O'Connor Park
	B Carroll 1-4, D Franks 1-2, G Healion 1-0, G Oakley 0-1, F Kerrigan 0-1, J Rigney 0-1.		G Farragher 0-10, K Wade 0-2, D Forde 0-2, A Cullinane 0-1, K Hynes 0-1, A Kerins 0-1, A Callanan 0-1.	Referee: D Murphy (Wexford)

17 February 2008 Round 2	Tipperary	2-20 - 2-9	Limerick	Semple Stadium
	E Kelly 1-12, S Callinan 1-1, C O'Mahony 0-2, S McGrath 0-2, S Butler 0-1, R O'Dwyer 0-1, J Woodlock 0-1.		A O'Shaughnessy 2-3, P Tobin 0-3, H Flavin 0-1, P O'Dwyer 0-1, A O'Connor 0-1.	Referee: D Kirwan (Cork)

9 March 2008 Round 3	Clare	0-12 - 2-15	Limerick	Cusack Park
	M Flaherty 0-3, N Gilligan 0-3, J Clancy 0-2, T Carmody 0-2, D Barrett 0-1, C Lynch 0-1.		A O'Shaughnessy 1-2, S O'Connor 1-1, P O'Dwyer 0-2, N Moran 0-2, M Foley 0-2, O Moran 0-1, M Fitzgerald 0-1, W McNamara 0-1, D Ryan 0-1, B Foley 0-1, D O'Grady 0-1.

9 March 2008 Round 3	Galway	0-16 - 0-16	Tipperary	Pearse Stadium
	K Wade 0-6, G Farragher 0-3, N Healy 0-2, A Cullinane 0-1, A Callanan 0-1, D Forde 0-1, K Hynes 0-1, G Mahon 0-1.		C O'Mahony 0-5, E Kelly 0-4, S McGrath 0-2, J O'Brien 0-2, S Butler 0-1, H Moloney 0-1, P Kerwick 0-1.	Referee: É Morris (Dublin)

9 March 2008 Round 3	Laois	1-17 - 2-13	Offaly	O'Moore Park
	J Young 0-6, E Holohan 1-2, T Fitzgerald 0-3, Z Keenan 0-3, J Dooley 0-1, C Coonan 0-1, J Fitzpatrick 0-1.		G Oakley 2-1, B Carroll 0-5, J Bergin 0-3, S Dooley 0-2, J Rigney 0-1, D Franks 0-1.	Referee: C McAllister (Cork)

16 March 2008 Round 4	Clare	0-17 - 1-14	Tipperary	Cusack Park
	M Flaherty 0-10, F Lynch 0-2, D O'Rourke 0-2, C Lynch 0-1, J Clancy 0-1, D Barrett 0-1.		E Kelly 0-6, T Fitzgerald 1-0, J Woodlock 0-3, S McGrath 0-1, D Egan 0-1, J O'Brien 0-1, S Butler 0-1, W Ryan 0-1.	Referee: M Wadding (Waterford)

16 March 2008 Round 4	Offaly	1-17 - 5-19	Limerick	O'Connor Park
	B Carroll 0-6, G Healion 1-1, G Oalkey 0-3, J Gorman 0-2, D Molloy 0-1, D Horan 0-1, C Flannery 0-1, S Dooley 0-1, A Egan 0-1.		D Ryan 2-2, A O'Shaughnessy 2-2, D O'Grady 0-4, S O'Connor 0-4, O Moran 1-0, N Moran 0-2, K Tobin 0-2, P O'Dwyer 0-1, M Foley 0-1, D Cosgrove 0-1	Referee: J Ryan (Tipperary)

16 March 2008 Round 4	Laois	0-8 - 6-26	Galway	O'Moore Park
	J Young 0-6, Z Keenan 0-1, N Holmes 0-1.		G Farragher 2-12, N Healy 3-0, I Tannian 1-2, F Healy 0-5, A Cullinane 0-3, R Murray 0-2, A Callahan 0-2.

23 March 2008 Round 5	Tipperary	4-17 - 1-12	Laois	Leahy Park
	L Corbett 3-2, T Fitzgerald 1-0, P Bourke 0-3, P Kerwick 0-3, S Butler 0-3, C O'Mahony 0-1, S Maher 0-1, J Woodlock 0-1, J Ceaser 0-1, D Hickey 0-1, S McGrath 0-1.		J Young 0-5, T Fitzgerald 1-0, Z Keenan 0-3, W Hyland 0-2, J Rowney 0-1, M Whelan 0-1.

23 March 2008 Round 5	Limerick	1-16 - 2-24	Galway	Gaelic Grounds
	K Tobin 0-5, A O'Connor 1-1, D O'Grady 0-3, D Ryan 0-2, P Tobin 0-2, N Moran 0-1, B Foley 0-1, Mike O'Brien 0-1.		G Farragher 0-11, I Tannian 1-3, K Wade 1-2, F Healy 0-4, C Dervan 0-1, K Hynes 0-1, D Forde 0-1, N Healy 0-1.	Referee: B Kelly (Westmeath)

23 March 2008 Round 5	Offaly	2-13 - 1-18	Clare	O'Connor Park
	B Carroll 1-7, J Gorman 1-1, J Bergin 0-4, G Healion 0-1.		M Flaherty 1-9, D O'Rourke 0-4, N Gilligan 0-2, F Lynch 0-1, B Buglar 0-1, B Nugent 0-1.	Referee: J Ryan (Tipperary)

== Division 1 Knockout ==
Play-off

31 March 2008 Play-off	Waterford	1-19 - 2-17	Cork	Walsh Park, Waterford
	S Prendergast (1-3), J Mullane (0-5), E Kelly (0-5, four frees), M Walsh (0-2), S O'Sullivan (0-2), E McGrath (0-2).	Report	B O'Connor (0-10, eight frees), L Desmond (0-4), C Naughton (1-0), F O'Leary (1-0), P Horgan (0-2, frees), S White (0-1).	Referee: J Ryan (Tipperary)

Quarter-finals

6 April 2008 Quarter-final	Limerick	0-8 - 0-13	Cork	Gaelic Grounds, Limerick
	A O'Shaughnessy (0-4, three frees), D O'Grady (0-1), N Moran (0-1), S O'Connor (0-1), P Tobin (0-1).	Report	B O'Connor (0-5, five frees), B Corry (0-3), C Naughton (0-2), J Gardiner (0-2, free and 65), S Óg Ó hAilpín (0-1).	Referee: B Kelly (Westmeath)

6 April 2008 Quarter-final	Tipperary	1-16 - 0-14	Waterford	Nowlan Park, Kilkenny
	E Kelly (0-10, seven frees, one 65), S Butler (1-1), E Corcoran (0-1, line ball), C O'Mahony (0-1, free), S McGrath (0-1), L Corbett (0-1), S Callinan 0-1.	Report	D Bennett (0-8, six frees), E McGrath (0-1), K McGrath (0-1, free), S Prendergast (0-1), S O'Sullivan (0-1), J Mullane (0-1), S Casey (0-1).	Referee: B Gavin (Offaly)

Semi-finals

13 April 2008 Semi-Final	Galway	2-22 – 0-24	Cork	Gaelic Grounds, Limerick
	G Farragher (1-5, four frees), I Tannian (1-2), J Canning (0-4, one sideline), D Hayes (0-4), N Healy (0-3), A Cullinane (0-1), K Hynes (0-1), R Murray (0-1), E Lynch (0-1).	Report	B O'Connor (0-8, six frees, one sideline), P O'Sullivan (0-4), P Cronin (0-4), J Gardiner (0-3), T Kenny (0-3), C Naughton (0-2).	Referee: J Owens (Wexford)

13 April 2008 Semi-Final	Kilkenny	1-10 – 1-15	Tipperary	Nowlan Park, Kilkenny
	M Fennelly; R Power (0-6, four frees), E Brennan (1-0), J Fitzpatrick (0-1, free), M Rice (0-1), R Hogan (0-1), A Fogarty (0-1).	Report	E Kelly (0-7, four frees, one 65), L Corbett (1-0), T Fitzgerald (0-2), S Callinan (0-2), E Corcoran (0-1), S McGrath (0-1), S Butler (0-1), R O'Dwyer (0-1).	Referee: M Wadding (Waterford)

Final

20 April 2008 Final	Tipperary	3-18 – 3-16	Galway	Gaelic Grounds, Limerick
4:15 p.m.	E Kelly 0-7 (0-5 frees); L Corbett 1-3; S Butler 0-6; W Ryan 1-1; B Dunne 1-0; S McGrath 0-1.	Report	J Canning 1-6 (0-4 frees); F Healy and A Callinan 1-0 each; D Hayes 0-4; K Hynes 0-3; R Murray, J Skehill (free) and G Farragher (free) 0-1 each.	Attendance: 16,315; Referee: B Kelly (Westmeath)

=== Top scorers ===
Overall

Rank	Player	County	Tally	Total	Matches	Average
1	Ger Farragher	Galway	4-53	65	7	9.2
2	Eoin Kelly	Tipperary	2-56	62		
3	Mark Flaherty	Clare	5-42	57	5	11.40
4	Andrew O'Shaughnessy	Limerick	7-17	38	5	7.60
5	Eoin Kelly	Waterford	2-29	35	6	5.83
5	James Young	Laois	1-32	35	5	7.00
7	Stuart Mullen	Dublin	0-33	33	5	6.60
8	Brian Carroll	Offaly	2-23	29	5	5.80
8	Liam Watson	Antrim	1-26	29	5	5.80

Single game

Rank	Player	County	Tally	Total	Opposition
1	Ger Farragher	Galway	2-12	18	Laois
2	Mark Flaherty	Clare	3-8	17	Galway
3	Mark Flaherty	Clare	1-12	15	Laois
3	Eoin Kelly	Tipperary	1-12	15	Limerick
5	Ger Farragher	Galway	1-11	14	Clare
6	John Mullane	Waterford	3-4	13	Dublin
6	Eoin Kelly	Tipperary	1-10	13	Offaly
6	James Young	Laois	1-10	13	Clare
9	Andrew O'Shaughnessy	Limerick	2-6	12	Laois
9	Mark Flaherty	Clare	1-9	12	Offaly
9	Stuart Mullen	Dublin	0-12	12	Antrim

Clean sheets

Rank	Goalkeeper	Team	Clean sheets
1	Brendan Cummins	Tipperary	3
1	James Skehill	Galway	3
3	Gary Maguire	Dublin	2
3	Brian Murray	Limerick	2
5	Damien Fitzhenry	Wexford	1
5	Shane O'Connor	Offaly	1
5	Donal Óg Cusack	Cork	1
5	Ryan McGarry	Antrim	1
5	P. J. Ryan	Kilkenny	1
5	James McGarry	Kilkenny	1

== Division 2 ==
=== Division 2A ===
Pos	Team	Pld	W	D	L	Diff	Pts	Notes
1	Westmeath	5	4	0	1	+35	8	Division 2 champions
2	Kerry	5	4	0	1	+26	8	
3	Kildare	5	3	0	2	-3	6	Relegated to Division 3
4	Mayo	5	2	0	3	+9	4	Relegated to Division 3
5	Wicklow	5	2	0	3	–24	4	Relegated to Division 3
6	Roscommon	5	0	0	5	–43	0	Relegated to Division 3

=== Division 2B ===
Pos	Team	Pld	W	D	L	Diff	Pts	Notes
1	Carlow	5	4	1	0	+29	9	Division 2 runners-up
2	Down	5	3	1	1	+25	7	
3	Meath	5	3	0	2	+35	6	Relegated to Division 3
4	Derry	5	3	0	2	–14	6	Relegated to Division 3
5	Armagh	5	1	0	4	–25	2	Relegated to Division 3
6	London	5	0	1	4	–50	0	Relegated to Division 3

=== Results ===
10 February 2008 Round 1	Kildare	2-12 - 0-11	Roscommon

10 February 2008 Round 1	Westmeath	0-17 - 1-11	Kerry

10 February 2008 Round 1	Wicklow	1-16 - 0-17	Mayo

10 February 2008 Round 1	Meath	1-25 - 0-8	Derry

10 February 2008 Round 1	Armagh	1-14 - 0-8	London

10 February 2008 Round 1	Down	1-11 - 0-14	Carlow

16 February 2008 Round 2	Westmeath	3-19 - 1-13	Roscommon

17 February 2008 Round 2	Kildare	1-15 - 1-14	Mayo

17 February 2008 Round 2	Kerry	4-7 - 1-11	Wicklow

17 February 2008 Round 2	Down	2-22 - 0-12	Armagh

17 February 2008 Round 2	Carlow	2-15 - 1-13	Meath

17 February 2008 Round 2	Derry	3-11 - 0-9	London

=== Knock-out stage ===
13 April 2008 Semi-Final	Carlow	1-16 – 3-4	Kerry

13 April 2008 Semi-Final	Westmeath	2-24 – 2-15	Down

20 April 2008 Final	Westmeath	2-12 – 0-12	Carlow	Gaelic Grounds
		Report		Attendance: 16,364; Referee: D Kirwan (Cork)

== Division 3 ==
=== Division 3 ===
Pos	Team	Pld	W	D	L	Diff	Pts	Notes
1	Donegal	4	4	0	0	+23	8	Division 3 runners-up
2	Louth	4	3	0	1	+16	6	Division 3 champions
3	Longford	3	1	0	2	+11	2	
4	Tyrone	3	1	1	2	–5	2	
5	Sligo	4	0	0	4	–45	0	Relegated to Division 4

=== Knock-out stage ===
13 April 2008 Final	Louth	1-16 – 0-11	Donegal	Roosky
		Report

== Division 4 ==
=== Division 4 ===
Pos	Team	Pld	W	D	L	Diff	Pts	Notes
1	South Down	4	3	0	1	+41	6	Division 3 runners-up
2	Monaghan	4	3	0	1	+27	6	Division 3 champions
3	Fermanagh	4	3	0	1	-11	6	
4	Cavan	4	1	0	3	–28	2	
5	Leitrim	4	0	0	4	–29	0	

=== Knock-out stage ===
13 April 2008 Final	South Down	5-14 – 1-27	Monaghan	Breffni Park, Cavan
		Report		Referee: John Devlin (Tyrone)

== 2009 structure ==
- Division One (8 teams) to consist of the top four teams in each of 1A and 1B in 2008.
- Division Two (8 teams) to consist of the fifth- and sixth-placed in each of 1A and 1B, and the top two teams in each of 2A and 2B, in 2008.
- Division Three (12 teams) to consist of the 3rd-6th teams in each of 2A and 2B, and the top four in Division 3, in 2008.
- Division Four (6 teams) to consist of fifth-placed team in Division 3, and all teams in Division 4
