= 2007 All-Ireland Senior Hurling Championship =

Championship details
- Dates: 27 May – 2 September 2007
- Teams: 12

All-Ireland champions
- Winning team: Kilkenny (30th win)
- Captain: Henry Shefflin
- Manager: Brian Cody

All-Ireland Finalists
- Losing team: Limerick
- Captain: Damien Reale
- Manager: Richie Bennis

Provincial champions
- Munster: Waterford
- Leinster: Kilkenny
- Ulster: Not Played
- Connacht: Not Played

Championship statistics
- No. matches played: 30
- Goals total: 95 (3.16 per game)
- Points total: 1013 (33.76 per game)
- Top Scorer: Andrew O'Shaughnessy (2–46)
- Player of the Year: Dan Shanahan
- All-Star Team: See here

The 2007 All-Ireland Senior Hurling Championship was the 121st staging of the All-Ireland hurling championship since its establishment by the Gaelic Athletic Association in 1887. The championship began on 22 May 2007 and ended on 2 September 2007.

Kilkenny were the defending champions, and successfully retained their All-Ireland crown following a 2–19 to 1–15 defeat of Limerick. This put them on level terms with Cork on 30 titles.

== Team changes ==
=== To Championship ===
Promoted from the Christy Ring Cup

- Antrim

=== From Championship ===
Relegated to the Christy Ring Cup

- Westmeath

== Teams ==
=== General information ===
Twelve counties will compete in the All-Ireland Senior Hurling Championship: one team in the Connacht Senior Hurling Championship, five teams in the Leinster Senior Hurling Championship, five teams in the Munster Senior Hurling Championship and one team in the Ulster Senior Hurling Championship.

County	Last provincial title	Last championship title	Position in 2006 Championship	Appearance
Antrim	2006	—	Champions (Christy Ring Cup)	
Clare	1998	1997	Semi-finals	
Cork	2006	2005	Runners-up	
Dublin	1961	1938	Qualifier Group B	
Galway	1999	1988	Quarter-finals	
Kilkenny	2006	2006	Champions	
Laois	1949	1915	Qualifier Group A	
Limerick	1996	1973	Quarter-finals	
Offaly	1995	1998	Qualifier Group B	
Tipperary	2001	2001	Quarter-finals	
Waterford	2004	1959	Semi-finals	
Wexford	2004	1996	Quarter-finals	

A total of twelve teams contested the championship, including eleven teams from the 2006 championship and new entrant. Westmeath were relegated in 2006 and contested the 2007 Christy Ring Cup, while Antrim, winners of the 2006 Christy Ring Cup, gained automatic promotion back to hurling's top tier.

=== Team summaries ===
==== Personnel and kits ====
Team	Colours	Sponsor	Captain(s)	Manager(s)
Antrim	Saffron and white	Creagh Concrete	Seán Delargy	Terence McNaughton; Dominic McKinley
Clare	Saffron and blue	Pat O'Donnell	Frank Lohan	Tony Considine
Cork	Red and white	O2	Kieran Murphy	Gerald McCarthy
Dublin	Navy and blue	Arnotts	Philip Brennan	Tommy Naughton
Galway	Maroon and white	Supermac's	David Collins	Ger Loughnane
Kilkenny	Black and amber	Glanbia	Henry Shefflin	Brian Cody
Laois	Blue and white	Heritage Hotel	Joe Fitzpatrick	Damien Fox
Limerick	Green and white	Sporting Limerick	James O'Brien; Damien Reale	Richie Bennis
Offaly	Green, white and gold	Carroll Cuisine	Rory Hanniffy	John McIntyre
Tipperary	Blue and gold	Enfer	Benny Dunne	Michael "Babs" Keating
Waterford	White and blue	Yoplait Essence	Michael Walsh	Justin McCarthy
Wexford	Purple and Gold	Wexford Cheddar	Damien Fitzhenry	John Meyler

== Leinster Senior Hurling Championship ==
Quarter-Finals
Offaly	1–26
Laois	0–10

Semi-Finals
Wexford	2–14
Dublin	3–10
Kilkenny	1–27
Offaly	1–13

Final
Wexford	1–12
Kilkenny	2–24

=== Quarter-final ===
27 May 2007 Quarter-final	Offaly	1–26 – 0–10	Laois	O'Connor Park
	D Murray 1–12 (9f, 2 '65s'); R Hanniffy 0–5 (1 sideline), B Carroll 0–3, G Hanniffy, J Bergin 0–2 each, B Murphy, M Cordial 0–1 each.	Report	J Young 0–8 (8f), J Fitzpatrick, Joe Phelan 0–1 each.	Attendance: 6,000; Referee: M Haverty (Galway))

=== Semi-finals ===
3 June 2007 Semi-final	Wexford	2–14 – 3–10	Dublin	Nowlan Park
	R Jacob 1–2, B Lamber 0–4 (0–3), N Higgins 1–0, P Carley (0-1f), M Jacob, D Stamp 0–2 each, E Quigley, D O'Connor 0–1 each.		J Kelly 1–2, R O'Carroll 1–1, D Curtin 0–4 (0-3f), K Flynn 1–0, S Mullen 0–2, R Fallon 0–1 (0-1f).	Attendance: 10,000; Referee: J Sexton (Cork)

10 June 2007 Semi-final	Kilkenny	1–27 – 1–13	Offaly	O'Moore Park
	H Shefflin (0–12, 9f, 1 '65'), M Comerford, J Fitzpatrick (0–3 each), E Larkin (1–0), E Brennan, A Fogarty (0–2 each), T Walsh, JJ Delaney, D Lyng, M Fennelly, E Reid (0–1 each).		D Murray (1–8, 8f, 1pen), B Murphy (0–2), B Carroll, M Cordial, G Hanniffy (0–1 each).	Attendance: 11,490; Referee: M Wadding (Waterford)

=== Final ===
1 July 2007 Final	Wexford	1–12 – 2–24	Kilkenny	Croke Park
	S Nolan (1–5 3f, 1 '65), R Jacob (0–3), R Kehoe (0–2, 1f), E Quigley (0–1), D Stamp (0–1).	Report	W O'Dwyer (2–3), H Shefflin (0–9, 4f), M Comerford (0–5), J Fitzpatrick (0–2, 1f), E Larkin (0–2), B Hogan (0–1), E Brennan (0–1).	Attendance: 34,872; Referee: P O'Connor (Limerick)

== Munster Senior Hurling Championship ==
Quarter-Finals
Cork	1–18
Clare	1–11

Semi-Finals
Limerick	1–19, 1–24 (aet), 0–22 (aet)
Tipperary	1–19, 2–21 (aet), 2–13 (aet)
Waterford	5–15
Cork	3–18

Final
Limerick	1–14
Waterford	3–17

=== Quarter-final ===
27 May 2007 Quarter-final	Cork	1–18 – 1–11	Clare	Semple Stadium
	B. O’Connor 0–5 (0–4 frees); P. Cronin 1–1; J. Deane 0–3 frees; K. Murphy (Sarsfields) and N. McCarthy 0–2 each; K. Murphy, T. Kenny, J. O’Connor, J. Gardiner (free) and S. Óg Ó hAilpín 0–1 each.	Report	N. Gilligan 1–1 (0–1 free); B. Nugent 0–4; A. Quinn 0–2; J. Clancy, D. O’Rourke, B. Gaffney (free) and A. Markham (’65) 0–1 each.	Attendance: 23,300; Referee: P O'Connor (Limerick)

=== Semi-finals ===
10 June 2007 Semi-final	Limerick	1–19 – 1–19	Tipperary	Gaelic Grounds
	A O’Shaughnessy 0–6 (0–4 frees); O Moran 0–5; P Tobin 1–1; B Foley 0–3; N Moran 0–2; M O’Brien 0–2; M Fitzgerald 0–1.	Report	W Ryan 0–7 (0–6 frees); J Carroll 1–1; D Egan 0–3; J Woodlock 0–2; E Kelly 0–2; L Corbett 0–2; R O’Dwyer, S McGrath, 0–1 each.	Attendance: 36,246; Referee: D Kirwan (Cork)

16 June 2007 Semi-final replay	Tipperary	2–21 – 1–24 (AET)	Limerick	Semple Stadium
	E. Kelly 0–9 (0–6 frees); S. Butler 1–3; D. Egan 1–2; L. Corbett 0–3; B. Dunne 0–2; J. Woodlock, E. Corcoran (S/L), 0–1 each.	Report	M. Fitzgerald 1–3; A. O’Shaughnessy 0–6 (0–5 frees 0–1 65); O. Moran 0–5; N. Moran 0–3; K. Tobin 0–2; J. O’Brien 0–2; B. Geary 0–2 (frees); M. Foley 0–1.	Attendance: 27,117; Referee: B Gavin (Offaly)

17 June 2007 Semi-final	Waterford	5–15 – 3–18	Cork	Semple Stadium
	E. Kelly 1–5 (0–4 frees); J. Mullane 1–4; D. Shanahan 2–1; P. Flynn 1–1 (1–0 free); K. McGrath 0–2 (frees); T. Browne 0–2.	Report	K. Murphy (Sars 2–0); B. O’Connor 0–6 (0–2 frees, 0–1 S/L, 0–1 65); J. Deane 0–5 (0–2 frees); P. Cronin 1–0; J. O’Connor 0–2; N. McCarthy 0–2; T. Kenny 0–2; C. Naughton 0–1.	Attendance: 36,352; Referee: B Kelly (Westmeath)

24 June 2007 Semi-final 2nd replay	Limerick	0–22 – 2–13 (AET)	Tipperary	Gaelic Grounds
	A. O’Shaughnessy 0–6 (0–3 frees 0–1 65); N. Moran 0–5; B. Geary 0–3 (0–1 free 0–1 65); O. Moran 0–3; M. Fitzgerald 0–2; K. Tobin 0–2; D. O’Grady 0–1.	Report	E. Kelly 0–9 (0–7 frees); D. Egan 1–0; W. Ryan 1–0; S. Butler 0–2; S. McGrath, P. Bourke, 0–1 each.	Attendance: 30,608; Referee: S McMahon (Clare)

=== Final ===
8 July 2007 Final	Waterford	3–17 – 1–14	Limerick	Semple Stadium
	D Shanahan 3–3; E Kelly 0–4 (2f); J Mullane 0–3; S Molumphy, P Flynn (1f) 0–2 each; S Prendergast, K McGrath (f), E McGrath 0–1 each.	Report	B Begley 1–2; M Fitzgerald, A O'Shaughnessy (2 '65's, 1f) 0–3 each; K Tobin 0–2; D O'Grady, P Tobin, O Moran, M O'Brien 0–1 each.	Attendance: 48,371; Referee: S Roche (Tipperary)

== Ulster Senior Hurling Championship ==
Quarter-finals
Derry	1–14
Armagh	0–16

Semi-finals
Antrim	4–16
London	3–08
Down	1–13, 5–16
Derry	0–16, 1–15

Final
Antrim	2–24
Down	0–04

== Cup competitions ==
=== Christy Ring Cup (Tier 2) ===
==== Group 2A ====
Teams	Pld	W	D	L	F	A	+/-	Pts	Qualification
Meath	4	3	1	0	6-80	5-51	+32	7	Advance to Knockout Stage
Westmeath	4	3	1	0	6-60	4-53	+13	7	Advance to Knockout Stage
Kerry	4	2	0	2	4-63	5-53	+7	4	
Down	4	1	0	3	7-57	7-66	-9	2	
Mayo	4	0	0	4	3-43	7-74	-43	0	Advance to Relegation Playoff

==== Group 2B ====
Team	Pld	W	D	L	F	A	+/-	Pts	Qualification
Carlow	4	4	0	0	8-59	7-42	+20	8	Advance to Knockout Stage
Kildare	4	3	0	1	4-77	5-54	+20	6	Advance to Knockout Stage
Derry	4	2	0	2	8-56	9-57	-4	4	
Wicklow	4	1	0	3	6-59	7-62	-6	2	
London	4	0	0	4	7-40	5-76	-30	0	Advance to Relegation Playoff

==== Knockout stage ====
Semi-Finals
Meath	1–13
Kildare	1–14
Carlow	2–15
Westmeath	4–11

Final
Kildare	0–13
Westmeath	2–15

== All-Ireland Qualifiers ==
=== Group 1A ===
Pos	Team	Pld	W	D	L	F	A	Diff	Pts	Qualification
1	Clare	3	3	0	0	7–45	3–40	+17	6	Advance to All-Ireland Quarter Finals
2	Galway	3	2	0	1	5–65	4–33	+35	4	Advance to All-Ireland Quarter Finals
3	Antrim	3	1	0	2	4–47	6–65	−24	2	
4	Laois	3	0	0	3	3–38	6–57	−28	0	

30 June Round 1	Antrim	2–15 – 3–21	Clare	Casement Park
	K McKeegan 0–4 (4f), N McManus, M Herron 1–1 each, P McGill 0–3, S McNaughton 0–2, J McIntosh, P Shields, S McCrory, A Graffin 0–1 each.	Report	N Gilligan 1–6 (3f, 1 '45'), D O'Connell 1–3, D McMahon 0–5 (1 sideline), D Quinn 1–2, B O'Connell 0–2, J McInerney, D O'Rourke, C McMahon 0–1 each.	Referee: T Mahon (Fermanagh)

30 June Round 1	Laois	1–14 – 3–20	Galway	O'Moore Park
	J Young 1–8 (1-6f); J Fitzpatrick 0–3; P Mullaney 0–2 (2f); T Fitzgerald 0–1.	Report	E Cloonan 0–10 (6f); D Hayes 2–1; N Healy 1–0; I Tannain 0–3; A Kerins, G Mahon 0–2 each; E Lynch, K Broderick 0–1 each.	Referee: D Connolly (Kilkenny)

7 July Round 2	Antrim	1–23 – 1–13	Laois	Casement Park
	K McKeegan 1–3 (2f); P McGill 0–5 (2f); C Herron 0–3; N McManus, M Herron, K Stewart, P Shiels, J McIntosh 0–2 each; McCambridge, K Kelly 0–1 each.	Report	J Young 0–9 (7f); J Brophy 1–1; M Whelan, JJ McHugh, T Fitzgerald 0–1 each.	Referee: F Smith (Meath)

7 July Round 2	Clare	2–10 – 0–14	Galway	Cusack Park
	N Gilligan 1–4, D O'Rourke 1–1, G Quinn, C Lynch 0–2 each, D Mcahon 0–1.	Report	E Cloonan 0–5, R Murray 0–3, K Wade 0–2, D Forde, I Tannian, D Tierney and E Lynch 0–1 each.	Attendance: 14,551; Referee: D Murphy (Wexford)

14 July Round 3	Laois	1–11 – 2–14	Clare	O'Moore Park
	J Young 1–7, J Brophy 0–2, J Fitzpatrick and M Whelan 0–1 each.	Report	B Nugent 1–3, D McMahon 0–5, C Lynch 1–0, D Quinn 0–3, J McInerney, D O'Rourke and B O'Connell 0–1 each.	Referee: J Ryan (Tipperary)

14 July Round 3	Galway	2–31 – 1–9	Antrim	Pearse Stadium
	K Wade 0–11 (6f, one 65), A Kerins 0–8, K Broderick 1–2, N Healy, I Tannian 0–4 each, D Hayes 1–0, F Healy, A Callanan 0–1 each.	Report	K McKeegan 0–6 (5f, one 65), P McGill 0–3 (2f), K Kelly 1–0.	Referee: D Richardson (Limerick)

=== Group 1B ===
Pos	Team	Pld	W	D	L	F	A	Diff	Pts	Qualification
1	Tipperary	3	3	0	0	5–53	4–42	+14	6	Advance to All-Ireland Quarter-Finals
2	Cork	3	2	0	1	5–65	2–42	+32	4	Advance to All-Ireland Quarter-Finals
3	Offaly	3	1	0	2	4–49	5–57	−11	2	
4	Dublin	3	0	0	3	3–39	6–65	−35	0	

30 June Round 1	Dublin	0–15 – 3–20	Cork	Parnell Park
	D Curtin 0–4 (4f), R O'Carroll 0–2, K Dunne 0–2, A McCrabbe 0–2 (1f), P Carton 0–2, J Boland 0–1, D Qualter 0–1, J Kelly 0–1, P O'Driscoll 0–1.		K Murphy 2–2, J Deane 0–6, P Cronin 1–2, J O'Connor 0–4 (3f), K Hartnett 0–2, B O'Connor 0–2, N Ronan 0–2.	Referee: Seamus Roche (Tipperary)

30 June Round 1	Tipperary	2–17 – 2–13	Offaly	Semple Stadium
	E Kelly (1–12, 1-10f), L Corbett (1–1), F Devanney (0–2), S Butler (0–2).	Report	D Murray (1–5, 1-4f, 0–1 ‘65'), S Ryan (1–2), G Hanniffy (0–2), P Cleary (0-1f), B Carroll (0–1); J Bergin (0–1), R Hanniffy (0–1).	Attendance: 7,533; Referee: M Haverty (Galway)

7 July Round 2	Dublin	1–11 – 1–20	Tipperary	Parnell Park
	P Carton 1–1, K Dunne 0–3, A McCrabbe 0–2 (0-1f), R O'Carroll, D Qualter, J Kelly, D Curtin (0-1f), S Mullen 0–1 each.	Report	W Ryan 0–10 (0–6), L Corbett 1–1, E Kelly 0–3 (0-1f), S Butler 0–2, B Dunne, F Devanney, D Egan, S McGrath 0–1.	Referee: D Connolly (Kilkenny)

7 July Round 2	Cork	1–27 – 0–11	Offaly	Páirc Uí Chaoimh
	N Ronan (1-05, 2f), J Deane (0-08, 5f), B O'Connor (0-07, 2f, 0-01 '65'), K Murphy (0-02), P Cronin (0-02).		D Murray (0-08, 6f, 1 '65'), B Murphy (0-01), M Cordial (0-01, 1f).	Attendance: 15,000; Referee: É Morris (Dublin)

14 July Round 3	Offaly	2–25 – 2–13	Dublin	O'Connor Park
	B Carroll (1–7), D Murray (0–5, 4f), M Cordial (1–2), B Murphy (0-03), E Bevans (0–3, 1sl), R Hanniffy (0–2), B Teehan, G Hanniffy (0–1 each), K Brady (0–1, 1f).		D Curtin (0–6, 6f), L Ryan (1–2), S O'Connor (1–0), G Bennett (0–2); M Carton, R Donnelly, D Qualter (0–1 each).	Referee: J Owens (Wexford)

14 July Round 3	Tipperary	2–16 – 1–18	Cork	Semple Stadium
	W Ryan 2–3, L Corbett, B Dunne 0–3 each, S Butler, H Moloney 0–2 each, D Hickey, J Carroll, D Egan 0–1 each.	Report	N Ronan 1–2, J Deane 0–5, J O'Connor 0–3, K Hartnett, K Murphy (Erin's Own), P Cronin 0–2 each, B O'Connor, K Murphy (Sarsfield's) 0–1 each.	Attendance: 12,902; Referee: B Kelly (Westmeath)

== All-Ireland Senior Hurling Championship ==
=== Bracket ===
Quarter-Finals
Wexford	3–10
Tipperary	1–14
Kilkenny	3–22
Galway	1–18
Limerick	1–23
Clare	1–16
Waterford	3–16, 2–17
Cork	3–16, 0–20

Semi-Finals
Wexford	1–10
Kilkenny	0–23
Limerick	5–11
Waterford	2–15

Final
Kilkenny	2–19
Limerick	1–15

=== All-Ireland quarter-finals ===
28 July 2007 Quarter-final	Wexford	3–10 – 1–14	Tipperary	Croke Park
	B Lambert (1–2, 1f), R Kehoe (1–0), D Fitzhenry (1–0, 1f), R Jacob, D O'Connor (0–2 each), S Nolan (0–2, 1 '65'), R McCarthy, E Quigley (0–1 each).	Report	L Corbett (1–1), D Hickey (0–4), E Kelly (0–3, 2f), B Dunne, H Maloney (0–2 each), J Carroll, S McGrath (0–1 each).	Attendance: 42,364; Referee: J McGrath (Westmeath)

28 July 2007 Quarter-final	Kilkenny	3–22 – 1–18	Galway	Croke Park
	D Lyng (0–2), J Fitzpatrick (0–3, free), E Brennan (2–2), H Shefflin (0–8, 8 frees), E Larkin (0–2), W O’Dwyer (0–1), M Comerford (0–2), A Fogarty (0–1), R Power (1–1).	Report	C Callanan (0–1, free), F Healy (0–2), A Kerins (0–4), R Murray (1–0), I Tannian (0–1), K Wade (0–7, 6 frees, 1 ’65’), N Healy (0–3).	Attendance: 42,364; Referee: D Murphy (Wexford)

29 July 2007 Quarter-final	Limerick	1–23 – 1–16	Clare	Croke Park
	A O'Shaughnessy (0–11, 6f), M Fitzgerald (0–4), D Ryan (1–2), K Tobin (0–2), O Moran, D O'Grady, J O'Brien, B Foley (0–1 each)	Report	N Gilligan (0–5, 5f), D McMahon (1–1), D O'Rourke, J Clancy (0–3 each), B Bugler, C Lynch (0–2 each)	Attendance: 72,426; Referee: M Wadding (Waterford)

29 July 2007 Quarter-final	Waterford	3–16 – 3–16	Cork	Croke Park
	D Shanahan (1–3), P Flynn, S Molumphy (1–2 each), E Kelly (0–4), K McGrath, J Mullane (0–2), S Prendergast (0–1).	Report	N Ronan (2–2), J Deane (0–5), K Murphy (1–0), B O’Connor (0–3), S Óg Ó hAilpín (0–2) K Hartnett, J O’Connor, T Kenny, J Gardiner (0–1).	Attendance: 72,426; Referee: B Gavin (Offaly)

5 August 2007 Quarter-final replay	Waterford	2–17 – 0–20	Cork	Croke Park
	D Shanahan (2–1), E Kelly (0–4, 1f), P Flynn (0–3, 3f), M Walsh, J Mullane, E McGrath (0–2 each), S Molumphy, S Prendergast (0–1 each), K McGrath (0–1, 1f).	Report	B O'Connor (0–9, 6f), T Kenny, J O'Connor, N Ronan, K Murphy (0–2 each), J Deane (0–2, 2f), T McCarthy (0–1).	Attendance: 54,924; Referee: B Kelly (Westmeath)

=== All-Ireland semi-finals ===
5 August 2007 Semi-final	Wexford	1–10 – 0–23	Kilkenny	Croke Park
	B Lambert (0–5, 2f), D Stamp, M Jacob, PJ Nolan, D O'Connor, R McCarthy (0–1 each).	Report	H Shefflin (capt) (0–14, 9f, 1 '65'), E Larkin, M Comerford, J Fitzpatrick (0–2 each), W O'Dwyer, A Fogarty, R Power (0–1 each).	Attendance: 54,924; Referee: M Haverty (Galway)

12 August 2007 Semi-final	Limerick	5–11 – 2–15	Waterford	Croke Park
	A O'Shaughnessy (2–7), D Ryan (2–0), B Begley (1–0), O Moran (0–2), M O'Brien, J O'Brien (0–1 each)	Report	P Flynn (0-04f), D Shanahan (0-04), S Molumphy (1-00), E McGrath (1-00), E Kelly (0-03, 1f), T Browne (0-01), K McGrath (0-01f), S Prendergast (0-01), J Kennedy (0-01).	Attendance: 80,546; Referee: S Roche (Tipperary)

=== All-Ireland Final ===
2 September 2007 Final	Kilkenny	2–19 – 1–15	Limerick	Croke Park
	E Brennan (1–5), H Shefflin (1–2), E Larkin, R Power (0–4 each), T Walsh (0–2), J Fitzpatrick, A Fogarty (0–1 each).	Report	A O'Shaughnessy (0–7), O Moran (1–3), D O'Grady (0–2), O'Connor, M Fitzgerald, N Moran (0–1 each).	Attendance: 82,127; Referee: D Kirwan (Cork)

== Championship statistics ==
=== Top scorers ===
==== Overall ====
Rank	Player	County	Tally	Total	Matches	Average
1	Andrew O'Shaughnessy	Limerick	2–46	52	7	7.42
2	Henry Shefflin	Kilkenny	1–45	48	5	9.60
3	Damien Murray	Offaly	3–38	47	5	9.40
4	Eoin Kelly	Tipperary	1–38	41	6	6.83
5	James Young	Laois	2–32	38	4	9.50
6	Dan Shanahan	Waterford	8–12	36	5	7.20
7	Joe Deane	Cork	0–34	34	7	4.85
8	Ben O'Connor	Cork	0–33	33	7	4.71
9	Neil Ronan	Cork	4–13	25	6	4.16
9	Niall Gilligan	Clare	3–16	25	5	5.00

==== Single game ====
Rank	Player	County	Tally	Total	Opposition
1	Damien Murray	Offaly	1–12	15	Laois
1	Eoin Kelly	Tipperary	1–12	15	Offaly
3	Henry Shefflin	Kilkenny	0–14	14	Wexford
4	Andrew O'Shaughnessy	Limerick	2–7	13	Waterford
5	Dan Shanahan	Waterford	3–3	12	Limerick
5	Henry Shefflin	Kilkenny	0–12	12	Offaly
7	Damien Murray	Offaly	1–8	11	Kilkenny
7	James Young	Laois	1–8	11	Galway
7	Andrew O'Shaughnessy	Limerick	0–11	11	Clare
7	Kerril Wade	Galway	0–11	11	Antrim

=== Scoring events ===
- Widest winning margin: 25 points
  - Galway 2–31 – 1-09 Antrim (Qualifier round 3)
- Most goals in a match: 8
  - Waterford 5–15 – 3–18 Cork (Munster semi-final)
- Most points in a match: 40
  - Kilkenny 1–27 – 1–13 Offaly (Leinster semi-final)
  - Galway 2–31 – 1-09 Antrim (Qualifier round 3)
- Most goals by one team in a match: 5
  - Waterford 5–15 – 3–18 Cork (Munster semi-final)
  - Limerick 5–11 – 2–15 Waterford (Semi-final)
- Most points by one team in a match: 31
  - Galway 2–31 – 1-09 Antrim (Qualifier round 3)
- Highest aggregate score: 57 points
  - Waterford 5–15 – 3–18 Cork (Munster semi-final)
- Lowest aggregate score: 30 points
  - Clare 2–10 – 0–14 Galway (Qualifier round 2)

== Miscellaneous ==
- In winning the All-Ireland title, Kilkenny claim their 30th championship and draw level with Cork at the top of the all-time roll of honour.
- For the first time since 1998, neither Cork nor Tipperary reached the Munster final.
- The Munster final meeting of Limerick and Waterford is their first meeting in a provincial decider since 1934.
- Limerick qualify for the All-Ireland final for the first time since 1996. It is also their first meeting with Kilkenny in a championship decider since 1974.

== See also ==
- 2007 Ulster Senior Hurling Championship
- 2007 Christy Ring Cup
- 2007 Nicky Rackard Cup
