= 2005 All-Ireland Senior Hurling Championship =

Championship details
- Dates: 15 May - 11 September 2005
- Teams: 12

All-Ireland champions
- Winning team: Cork (30th win)
- Captain: Seán Óg Ó hAilpín
- Manager: John Allen

All-Ireland Finalists
- Losing team: Galway
- Captain: Liam Donoghue
- Manager: Conor Hayes

Provincial champions
- Munster: Cork
- Leinster: Kilkenny
- Ulster: Antrim
- Connacht: Not Played

Championship statistics
- No. matches played: 36
- Top Scorer: Ger Farragher (3–57)
- Player of the Year: Jerry O'Connor
- All-Star Team: See here

The 2005 All-Ireland Senior Hurling Championship was the 119th staging of the All-Ireland Senior Hurling Championship, the Gaelic Athletic Association's premier inter-county hurling tournament, since its establishment in 1887. The draw for the provincial fixtures took place on 17 October 2004. The championship began on 15 May 2005 and ended on 11 September 2005.

Cork entered the championship as defending champions.

On 11 September 2005, Cork won the championship after a 1–21 to 1–16 defeat of Galway in the All-Ireland final at Croke Park. This was their 30th All-Ireland title overall and their second title in succession.

Galway's Ger Farragher was the championship's top scorer with 3–57.

== New Format ==
On 17 April 2004, the Hurling Development Committee's proposal to restructure the entire championship system was endorsed by Congress. The new format resulted in a three-tier championship. In the top grade 12 teams would compete for the Liam MacCarthy Cup, with the first round losers and beaten semi-finalists from Leinster and Munster joining Antrim and Galway in a league section split into two groups. The group winners would re-enter the championship at the All-Ireland quarter-final stage, meeting the losing provincial finalists. The runners-up in each group would face the Leinster and Munster champions in the last eight. The new format provided two additional quarter-finals, a minimum of three games for each team and four for the vast majority. In the league section, matches would be played on a home and away basis. The bottom-placed teams in both groups would contest the relegation section with the eventual loser being relegated to the Christy Ring Cup.

== Team changes ==
=== From Championship ===
Relegated to the Christy Ring Cup

- Carlow
- Down
- Derry
- Kerry
- Kildare
- Meath
- Westmeath
- Wicklow

Relegated to the Nicky Rackard Cup

- London

Withdrew from Championship

- New York

== Teams ==
=== General information ===
Twelve counties will compete in the All-Ireland Senior Hurling Championship: one team in the Connacht Senior Hurling Championship, five teams in the Leinster Senior Hurling Championship, five teams in the Munster Senior Hurling Championship and one team in the Ulster Senior Hurling Championship.

County	Last provincial title	Last championship title	Position in 2004 Championship	Appearance
Antrim	2004	—	Quarter-finals	
Clare	1998	1997	Quarter-finals	
Cork	2003	2004	Champions	
Dublin	1961	1938	Round 1	
Galway	1999	1988	Round 2	
Kilkenny	2003	2003	Runners-up	
Laois	1949	1915	Round 1	
Limerick	1996	1973	Round 1	
Offaly	1995	1998	Round 2	
Tipperary	2001	2001	Round 2	
Waterford	2004	1959	Semi-finals	
Wexford	2004	1996	Semi-finals	

=== Overview ===
Twelve teams participated in hurling's top tier in 2005. These were the same 12 teams who competed in Division 1 of the National Hurling League. The provincial championships in Leinster and Munster featured five teams each, while Antrim and Galway entered the championship at the group stage.

=== Personnel and general information ===
Team	Colours	Manager(s)	Captain(s)	Sponsor
Antrim		Dinny Cahill	Jim Connolly	Bushmills
Cork		Dónal O'Grady	Ben O'Connor	O2
Clare		Anthony Daly	Seánie McMahon	Pat O'Donnell
Dublin		Tommy Naughton	David Curtin	Arnotts
Galway		Liam Donoghue	Conor Hayes	Supermacs
Kilkenny		Brian Cody	Peter Barry	Avonmore
Laois		Paudie Butler	Joe Phelan	The Heritage
Limerick		Joe McKenna	Ollie Moran	Sporting Limerick
Offaly		John McIntyre	Barry Teehan	Carroll Cuisine
Tipperary		Ken Hogan	Benny Dunne	Enfer
Waterford		Justin McCarthy	Eoin Kelly	Gain Feeds
Wexford		Séamus Murphy	Keith Rossiter	Wexford Creamery

== Provincial championships ==
=== Leinster Senior Hurling Championship ===
==== Bracket ====
Quarter-finals
Laois	4–14
Dublin	0–14

Semi-finals
Wexford	0–24
Laois	1–10
Offaly	0–15
Kilkenny	6–28

Leinster final
Wexford	1–16
Kilkenny	0–22

==== Quarter-final ====
22 May 2005 Quarter-final	Laois	4–14 – 0–14	Dublin	Nowlan Park, Kilkenny
	J Young 1–9 (1–0 pen, 6f); D Culleton 2–1; L Tynan 1–1; S Dwyer, P Russell, E Meagher 0–1 each.	Report	E Carroll, D Cortin (2f, 2 '65) 0–4 each; D Sweeney 0–2; T Moore, S Mullen, A de Paor, R Fallon (65) 0–1 each.	Referee: T McIntyre (Antrim)

==== Semi-finals ====
12 June 2005 Semi-final	Wexford	0–24 – 1–10	Laois	Croke Park, Dublin
	R Jacob 0–7 (5f), D Ruth 0–4 (3f, 1'65'), D Mythen 0–3, R McCarthy, E Quigley, M Jordan, N Higgins 0–2 each, A Fenlon, P Carley 0–1 each.	Report	J Young 0–7 (3f, 2'65'), D Culleton 1–0, T Fitzgerald 0–1.	Referee: J Sexton (Limerick)

12 June 2005 Semi-final	Kilkenny	6–28 – 0–15	Offaly	Croke Park, Dublin
	H Shefflin 2–11 (4f, 1 pen), M Comerford 1–3, R Power 0–5, DJ Carey 1–2, R Power and E McCormack 1–1, D Lyng 0–2, C Phelan and R Mullally 0–1 each, B Barry 0–1 (65).	Report	D Murray 0–7 (7f), B Carroll 0–3 (1f), G Hanniffy 0–2, R Hanniffy, D Hayden and C Parlon 0–1 each.	Referee: M Haverty (Galway)

==== Final ====
3 July 2005 Final	Kilkenny	0–22 – 1–16	Wexford	Croke Park, Dublin
	H Shefflin 0–8 (7f 1'65'), T Walsh 0–4, E Larkin, R Power 0–3 each, E Brennan 0–2, C Phelan, R Mullally 0–1 each.	Report	R Jacob 0–5 (5f), D Mythen 1–1, M Jordan, E Quigley, R McCarthy 0–2 each, P Carley, M Jacob, D Ruth, R Barry 0–1 each.	Referee: S Roche (Tipperary)

=== Munster Senior Hurling Championship ===
==== Quarter-finals ====
15 May 2005 Quarter-final	Tipperary	2–14 – 2–14	Limerick	Semple Stadium, Thurles
	E Kelly 0–7 (5f), P Kelly 0–4 (4f), G O'Grady, J Devane 1–0 each, T Dunne, L Corbett 0–1, C Morrissey 0–1 each.	Report	TJ Ryan 1–7 (1–0 pen, 0-5f), D Sheehan 1–0, N Moran 0–3, P Tobin 0–2, C Fitzgerald, P O'Grady 0–1 each.	Referee: D Kirwan (Cork)

21 May 2005 Quarter-final replay	Limerick	0–18 – 2–13 (aet)	Tipperary	Gaelic Grounds, Limerick
	TJ Ryan 0–8 (all fs); D O'Grady 0–2; P Lawlor 0–1 (f); P O'Grady, C Fitzgerald, N Moran, A O'Shaughnessy, D Sheehan, K Tobin, D Ryan 0–1 each.	Report	E Kelly 0–7 (0–6 fs); G O'Grady, E Sweeney 1–0 each; T Dunne 0–4, P Kelly, L Corbett 0–1 each.	Referee: A Mac Suibhne (Dublin)

==== Semi-finals ====
22 May 2005 Semi-final	Cork	2–17 – 2–15	Waterford	Semple Stadium, Thurles
	P Flynn 1–6 (6f), E Kelly 0–6, D Shanahan 1–0, S Prendergast 0–2, T Browne 0–1.	Report	J Deane 1–3 (0-1f), B Corcoran 1–2, N McCarthy, B O'Connor (2f, 1'65') 0–4 each, J O'Connor 0–2, Kieran Murphy (Sarsfields), D O'Sullivan (pen) 0–1 each.	Referee: S Roche (Tipperary)

5 June 2005 Semi-final	Tipperary	2–14 – 0–14	Clare	Gaelic Grounds, Limerick
	E Kelly 0–7 (4f); L Corbett 1–1; M Webster 1–0; E Sweeney, F Devaney 0–2 each; B Dunne, P Kelly 0–1 each.	Report	N Gilligan 0–5 (3f); D McMahon, S McMahon (2f), B Nugent, T Griffin 0–2 each; T Carmody 0–1.	Referee: P O'Connor (Limerick)

==== Final ====
26 June 2005 Final	Cork	1–21 – 1–16	Tipperary	Páirc Uí Chaoimh, Cork
	B O'Connor 0–6 (6f), J Deane 0–5 (3f), Kieran Murphy (Sarsfields) 1–2, N Ronan 0–3, J O'Connor 0–2, B Corcoran, N McCarthy, Kieran Murphy (Erin's Own) 0–1 each.	Report	P Kelly 0–7 (2f 1'65'), E Kelly 0–6 (2f), T Dunne 1–0, J Devane 0–2, J Carroll 0–1.	Referee: B Kelly (Westmeath)

== Cup competitions ==
=== Christy Ring Cup (Tier 2) ===
==== Group A ====
Pos	Team	Pld	W	D	L	SF	SA	Diff	Pts	Qualification
1	Westmeath	4	3	0	1	10–64	8–49	+21	6	Advance to Knockout Stage
2	Down	4	3	0	1	14–72	9–57	+30	6	Advance to Knockout Stage
3	Meath	4	2	1	1	9–67	7–52	+21	5	
4	Roscommon	4	1	0	3	4–46	13–83	−64	2	Advance to Relegation Playoffs
5	Derry	4	0	1	3	7–49	7–57	−8	1	Advance to Relegation Playoffs

==== Group B ====
Pos	Team	Pld	W	D	L	SF	SA	Diff	Pts	Qualification
1	Carlow	4	3	0	1	5–50	5–53	−3	6	Advance to Knockout Stage
2	Kildare	4	3	0	1	11–54	7–50	+16	6	Advance to Knockout Stage
3	Kerry	4	2	1	1	12–59	8–46	+25	5	
4	Wicklow	4	1	1	2	8–55	10–49	+0	3	Advance to Relegation Playoffs
5	Mayo	4	0	0	4	7–41	13–61	−38	0	Advance to Relegation Playoffs

==== Knockout stage ====
Semi-Finals
1A	Westmeath	7–14
2B	Kildare	1–12
1B	Carlow	1–11
2A	Down	4–23

Final
1A	Westmeath	1–23
1B	Down	2–18

=== Nicky Rackard Cup (Tier 3) ===
==== Group A ====
Pos	Team	Pld	W	D	L	SF	SA	Diff	Pts	Qualification
1	Donegal	3	3	0	0	14-43	5-25	45	6	Advance to Semi-Finals
2	Tyrone	3	2	0	1	8-44	10-30	8	4	Advance to Quarter-Final
3	Sligo	3	1	0	2	10-27	10-44	-17	2	
4	Fermanagh	3	0	0	3	5-30	12-45	-36	0	

==== Group B ====
Pos	Team	Pld	W	D	L	SF	SA	Diff	Pts	Qualification
1	Louth	3	3	0	0	9-51	4-28	38	6	Advance to Semi-Finals
2	Armagh	3	2	0	1	12-42	6-26	34	4	Advance to Quarter-Final playoff
3	Cavan	2	0	0	2	3-13	5-37	-30	0	
4	Leitrim	2	0	0	2	3-21	12-36	-42	0	

==== Group C ====
Pos	Team	Pld	W	D	L	SF	SA	Diff	Pts	Qualification
1	London	3	3	0	0	2-64	5-29	26	6	Advance to Semi-Finals
2	Longford	3	2	0	1	6-38	4-36	8	4	Advance to Quarter-Final playoff
3	Monaghan	3	1	0	2	4-36	5-42	-9	2	
4	Warwickshire	3	0	0	3	4-24	2-55	-25	0	

==== Knockout stage ====
Quarter-final playoffs
Longford	2–14
Armagh	1–14

Quarter-finals
Tyrone	3–14
Longford	3–13

Semi-finals
London	3–13
Donegal	1–10
Louth	3–10
Tyrone	1–08

Final
London	5–08
Louth	1–05

== All-Ireland qualifiers ==
=== Group A ===
==== Table ====
Pos	Team	Pld	W	D	L	SF	SA	Diff	Pts	Qualification
1	Galway	3	3	0	0	6–69	4–35	+40	6	Advance to All Ireland Quarter-finals
2	Limerick	3	2	0	1	8–54	3–36	+33	4	Advance to All Ireland Quarter-finals
3	Laois	3	1	0	2	3–41	5–53	−18	2	Advance to Relegation playoffs
4	Antrim	3	0	0	3	2–35	7–75	−55	0	Advance to Relegation playoffs

==== Results ====
18 June 2005 Round 1	Laois	2–11 – 2–22	Galway	O'Moore Park, Portlaoise
	J Young 0–6 (4f, 1 65), L Tynan 1–1, D Culleton 1–0, T Fitgerald 0–2, C Healy, J Walsh 0–1 each.	Report	G Farragher 1–11 (1-10f), T Óg Regan 0–5 (3f), K Hayes 1–1, R Murray 0–3, D Tierney, N Healy 0–1 each.	Referee: M Wadding (Waterford)

25 June 2005 Round 1	Antrim	1–09 – 4–25	Limerick	Casement Park, Belfast
	J Connolly 1–0; K McKeegan 0–3 (3f); B McFall 0–2 (1f); M McCambridge, P Richmond, J McIntosh, K Stewart 0–1 each.	Report	TJ Ryan 1–5 (4f); D Ryan 2–1; N Moran 0–6; A O'Shaughnessy 1–1; P Lawlor 0–3 (0-1f, 0–1 '65'); D Sheahan, P Kirby 0–2 each; A O'Connor 0–2 (0-1f); P O'Grady, P Tobin, Conor Fitzgerald 0–1 each.	Referee: S McGrath (Westmeath)

1 July 2005 Round 2	Laois	1–09 – 2–15	Limerick	O'Moore Park, Portlaoise
	J Young 1–5 (1-4f), J Phelan, J Rowney, T Fitzgerald, M Rooney 0–1 each.	Report	TJ Ryan 0–8 (0–6), N Moran 0–3, O Moran, P Kirby 1–0 each, A O'Shaughnessy 0–2, D O'Grady, D Ryan 0–1 each.	Referee: E Morris (Dublin)

2 July 2005 Round 2	Galway	3–29 – 0–10	Antrim	Pearse Stadium, Galway
	G Farragher 0–12 (7f, 1 '65'), D Tierney 2–2, D Hayes 0–6, N Healy 1–1, R Murray 0–3, K Hayes, F Healy 0–2 each, A Smyth 0–1.	Report	C Herron, J Connolly, C McGuckian 0–2 each, P Richmond, A Delargy, J McIntosh (f), J Campbell (f) 0–1 each.	Referee: J Guinan (Kilkenny)

9 July 2005 Round 3	Limerick	2–14 – 1–18	Galway	Gaelic Grounds, Limerick
	TJ Ryan 1–2 (1-1f), P Kirby 0–6 (5f), D Ryan 1–0, N Moran 0–2, P O'Grady 0–2, P Tobin, O Moran 0–1 each.	Report	G Farragher 0–8 (6f), D Hayes 1–3, R Murray 0–2, T Óg Regan, O Canning, D Tierney, F Healy, A Kearns 0–1 each.	Referee: B Gavin (Offaly)

9 July 2005 Round 3	Antrim	1–16 – 0–21	Laois	Casement Park, Belfast
	J McIntosh 1–7 (3f), K McKeegan 0–3 (3 '65s'), J Connolly, M Herron, P Richmond, A Delargy, B Quinn, J Scullion 0–1 each.	Report	J Young 0–8 (6f, 1 '65'), L Tynan 0–3, M Rooney, J Walsh, J Rowney 0–2 each, T Fitzgerald, E Meagher, C Brophy, J Phelan 0–1 each.	Referee: P Greene (Galway)

=== Group B ===
==== Table ====
Pos	Team	Pld	W	D	L	SF	SA	Diff	Pts	Qualification
1	Clare	3	3	0	0	6–49	1–41	+23	6	Advance to All Ireland Quarter-finals
2	Waterford	3	2	0	1	5–64	6–32	+29	4	Advance to All Ireland Quarter-finals
3	Offaly	3	1	0	2	4–41	4–52	−11	2	Advance to Relegation playoffs
4	Dublin	3	0	0	3	3–26	7–55	−41	0	Advance to Relegation playoffs

==== Results ====
18 June 2005 Round 1	Waterford	1–26 – 1–15	Offaly	Dr. Cullen Park, Carlow
	K McGrath 0–5 (2f 1 65), M Walsh 0–3, E McGrath 0–1, J Mullane 0–8, S Prendergast 0–1, P Flynn 1–8 (1-6f)	Report	M Cordial 0–2, D Hayden 0–1, G Hanniffy 0–2, B Murphy 0–2, B Carroll 0–5 (1f), D Murray 0–3 (3f); A Hanrahan 1–0.

18 June 2005 Round 1	Dublin	0–09 – 1–23	Clare	Parnell Park, Dublin
	D Curtin 0–5 (5f), K Flynn 0–2 (1f), R Fallon (f), P Carton 0–1 each.	Report	N Gilligan 0–6 (3f), T Carmody 0–5, D McMahon 0–4, D O'Connell 1–0, T Griffin, D Forde 0–2 each, D Clancy, D O'Rourke, B O'Connell, S McMahon (f) 0–1 each.	Referee: D Murphy (Wexford)

2 July 2005 Round 2	Clare	1–12 – 1–11	Offaly	O'Moore Park, Portlaoise
	N Gilligan 0–7 (5f), T Griffin 1–0, S MacMahon 0–2 (2f), C Lynch, A Markham and D Hoey 0–1 each.	Report	B Carroll 0–5 (4f), D Hayden 1–0, A Hanrahan 0–2, B Mullins, G Hanniffy, B Murphy and S Brown 0–1 each.	Referee: G Harrington (Cork)

2 July 2005 Round 2	Waterford	4–17 – 1-03	Dublin	Walsh Park, Waterford
	P Flynn 1–3 (0-3f), J Mullane, S Prendergast 1–2, E Kelly 0–4, P O'Brien 1–0, K McGrath (1 '65'), E McGrath 0–2 each, T Browne, J Kennedy 0–1 each.	Report	J Kingston 1–0, D Curtin 0–2 (2f), T McGrane 0–1	Referee: B White (Tipperary)

9 July 2005 Round 3	Dublin	2–14 – 2–15	Offaly	Parnell Park, Dublin
	E Carroll 0–5 (1f), S McDonald 1–1, P Carton 1–0, D Sweeney (1 sline), K Flynn 0–2 (2f), M Carton, D Russell, C Meehan, R Fallon (1 '65') 0–1 each.	Report	B Carroll 0–8 (4f), D Hayden, M Cordial 1–0 each, A Hanrahan 0–2, M O‘Hara, B Whelahan (1f), S Brown, B Murphy, D Murphy 0–1 each.	Referee: J McDonnell (Tipperary)

9 July 2005 Round 3	Clare	4–14 – 0–21	Waterford	Cusack Park, Ennis
	N Gilligan 0–6 (5f), A Markham 2–0, T Griffin 1–2, D McMahon 1–1, S McMahon 0–2 (1 '65'), B O'Connell, F Lohan, D O'Rourke 0–1 each.	Report	K McGrath 0–5 (4f), J Mullane 0–4, P Flynn 0–4 (4f), D Shanahan 0–3, E Kelly 0–2, T Browne, M Walsh, E McGrath 0–1 each.	Referee: M Haverty (Galway)

=== Relegation Section ===
23 July 2005 Semi-final	Dublin	3–13 – 1–10	Laois	Dr. Cullen Park, Carlow
	D Curtin 1–8 (1-5f, 2 '65s); E Carroll, K Flynn 1–0 each; D Sweeney 0–2; C Meehan, L Ryan, D Russell 0–1 each.	Report	J Young 0–7 (4f, 2 linecuts); P Russell 1–0; T Fitzgerald, M McEvoy, S Dwyer 0–1 each.	Referee: B White (Tipperary)

23 July 2005 Semi-final	Offaly	5–17 – 0–18	Antrim	Croke Park, Dubin
	B Carroll 1–8 (4f); M Cordial 2–3; B Murphy 1–3; J Brady 1–0; M O'Hara, G Hanniffy, D Murray 0–1 each.	Report	B McCall 0–7 (5f); J McIntosh 0–5 (2f, 1 '65); M Scullion, J Connelly, B Herron, C Hammill, K McKee ('65), C Herron 0–1 each.	Referee: J Sexton (Limerick)

30 July 2005 Final	Laois	1–23 – 1–15	Antrim	Páirc Tailteann, Navan
	J Young 0–11 9 frees, P Russell 1 free, L Tynan 0–4, J Rowney 0–3, M Rooney 0–2.	Report	P Richmond 1–2, B McFall 0–5, J Connelly 0–3, C Hamill 0–2, C Cunning, K McKeegan, M Herron 0–1 each.	Referee: M Wadding (Waterford)

== All-Ireland Senior Hurling Championship ==
=== Bracket ===
Teams in bold advanced to the next round. The provincial champions are marked by an asterisk.

**Quarter-finals**; 24 / 31 July
**Cork***	**1–18**
Waterford	1–13
Wexford	0–12
**Clare**	**1–20**
**Kilkenny** *	**0–18**
Limerick	0–13
Tipperary	2–18
**Galway**	**2–20**

**Semi-finals**; 14 / 21 August
**Cork***	**0–16**
Clare	0–15
Kilkenny*	4–18
**Galway**	**5–18**

**Final**; 11 September
**Cork***	**1–21**
Galway	1–16

=== All-Ireland quarter-finals ===
24 July 2005 Quarter-final	**Clare**	**1–20 – 0–12**	**Wexford**	Croke Park, Dublin
	N Gilligan 0–5 (4f), D McMahon 0–4, A Markham 1–1, T Griffin, T Carmody 0–3 each, S McMahon (1 '65') 0–2, C Lynch, B O'Connell 0–1 each.	Report	D Mythen, R Jacob (3f) 0–3 each, M Jacob 0–2, A Fenlon, D Ruth (f), D Lyng ('65'), R Barry 0–1 each.	Attendance: 55,857; Referee: B Gavin (Offaly)

24 July 2005 Quarter-final	**Cork**	**1–18 – 1–13**	**Waterford**	Croke Park, Dublin
	J Deane 0–5 (4f), B Corcoran 1–1, B O'Connor 0–4 (2f, 1 '65'), J Gardiner 0–3, J O'Connor, T Kenny, S Ó hAilpín, N Ronan, Kieran Murphy (Sarsfields) 0–1 each.	Report	P Flynn 0–5 (5f), S Prendergast 0–4, D Shanahan 1–0, T Browne, D Bennett, J Mullane, K McGrath (f) 0–1 each.	Attendance: 55,857; Referee: B Kelly (Westmeath)

31 July 2005 Quarter-final	**Galway**	**2–20 – 2–18**	**Tipperary**	Croke Park, Dublin
	G Farragher 0–9, D Hayes 1–0, D Forde 1–0, R Murray 0–3, F Healy 0–2, D Tierney 0–2, A Kerins 0–2, N Healy 0–1, S Kavanagh 0–1.	Report	E Kelly 1–9, T Dunne 1–1, P Kelly 0–4, G O'Grady 0–1, M Webster 0–1, B Dunne 0–1, D Fitzgerald 0–1.	Attendance: 44,438; Referee: A Mac Suibhne (Dublin)

31 July 2005 Quarter-final	**Kilkenny**	**0–18 – 0–13**	**Limerick**	Croke Park, Dublin
	H Shefflin (0–9, seven frees), DJ Carey (0–3, one penalty), T Walsh (0–2), M Comerford (0–2), P Barry (0–1, a free), D Lyng (0–1).	Report	TJ Ryan (0–6, five frees), P Lawlor (0–3, one free, one 65), N Moran (0–1), J O'Brien (0–1), P O'Grady (0–1), A O'Suaghnessy (0–1).	Attendance: 44,438; Referee: G Harrington (Cork)

=== All-Ireland semi-finals ===
14 August 2005 Semi-final	**Cork**	**0–16 – 0–15**	**Clare**	Croke Park, Dublin
	B O'Connor 0–5, J Gardiner 0–2, J O'Connor 0–2, J Deane 0–2, N Ronan 0–1, K Murphy 0–1, N McCarthy 0–1, T McCarthy 0–1, S Óg Ó hAilpín 0–1.	Report	T Carmody 0–4, N Gilligan 0–4, T GRiffin 0–3, A Quinn 0–2, S McMahon 0–1, B O'Connell 0–1.	Attendance: 50,596; Referee: D Murphy (Wexford)

21 August 2005 Semi-final	**Galway**	**5–18 – 4–18**	**Kilkenny**	Croke Park, Dublin
	G Farragher (2–9, 8 frees), N Healy (3–0), R Murray (0–2), D Forde (0–2), D Tierney (0–2), D Hayes (0–1), F Healy (0–1), K Broderick (0–1).	Report	H Shefflin (1–9, 7 frees, 1 '65), E Brennan (2–4), J Hoyne (1–0), R Power (0–2), T Walsh (0–1), M Comerford (0–1), E Larkin (0–1).	Attendance: 39,975; Referee: S Roche (Tipperary)

=== All-Ireland final ===
11 September 2005 Final	**Cork**	**1–21 – 1–16**	**Galway**	Croke Park, Dublin
	B O’Connor 1–7 (0–2 frees); T Kenny 0–3; J Deane 0–3 frees; B Corcoran, J O’Connor and T McCarthy 0–2 each; N McCarthy and J Gardiner 0–1 each.	Report	G Farragher 0–8 (0–6 frees); D Hayes 1–0; A Kerins 0–3; F Healy 0–2; N Healy, D Hardiman and D Tierney 0–1 each.	Attendance: 81,136; Referee: S Roche (Tipperary)

== Championship statistics ==
=== Top scorers ===
==== Overall ====
Rank	Player	County	Tally	Total	Matches	Average
1	Ger Farragher	Galway	3–57	66	6	11.00
2	James Young	Laois	2–53	59	7	8.43
3	Henry Shefflin	Kilkenny	3–37	46	4	11.50
4	T. J. Ryan	Limerick	3–36	45	6	7.50
5	Eoin Kelly	Tipperary	1–36	39	5	7.80
6	Paul Flynn	Waterford	3–26	35	5	7.00
7	Niall Gilligan	Clare	0–33	33	6	5.50
8	Brian Carroll	Offaly	1–29	32	5	6.40
9	Ben O'Connor	Cork	1–26	29	5	5.80
10	Joe Deane	Cork	1–18	21	5	4.20

==== In a single game ====
Rank	Player	County	Tally	Total	Opposition
1	Henry Shefflin	Kilkenny	2–11	17	Offaly
2	Ger Farragher	Galway	2-09	15	Kilkenny
3	Ger Farragher	Galway	1–11	14	Laois
4	Henry Shefflin	Kilkenny	1-09	12	Galway
4	Eoin Kelly	Tipperary	1-09	12	Galway
4	James Young	Laois	1-09	12	Dublin
4	Ger Farragher	Galway	0–12	12	Antrim
5	Paul Flynn	Waterford	1-08	11	Offaly
5	Brian Carroll	Offaly	1-08	11	Antrim
5	David Curtin	Dublin	1-08	11	Laois
5	James Young	Laois	0–11	11	Antrim

== Miscellaneous ==
- The attendance of 81,136 at the All-Ireland final was the biggest since 1956 when 83,096 saw Wexford defeat Cork.

== See also ==
- 2005 Christy Ring Cup (Tier 2)
- 2005 Nicky Rackard Cup (Tier 3)
