= 2004 All-Ireland Senior Hurling Championship =

Championship details
- Dates: 2 May – 12 September 2004
- Teams: 22

All-Ireland champions
- Winning team: Cork (29th win)
- Captain: Ben O'Connor
- Manager: Dónal O'Grady

All-Ireland Finalists
- Losing team: Kilkenny
- Captain: Martin Comerford
- Manager: Brian Cody

Provincial champions
- Munster: Waterford
- Leinster: Wexford
- Ulster: Antrim
- Connacht: Not Played

Championship statistics
- No. matches played: 32
- Goals total: 108 (3.375 per game)
- Points total: 915 (28.5 per game)
- Top Scorer: Henry Shefflin (6–45)
- Player of the Year: Seán Óg Ó hAilpín
- All-Star Team: See here

The 2004 All-Ireland Senior Hurling Championship was the 118th staging of Ireland's premier hurling knock-out competition. Cork won the championship, beating Kilkenny 0–17 to 0–9 in the final at Croke Park, Dublin.

== Format ==
=== Connacht Championship ===
Participating counties (1): Galway

Galway were unopposed in the Connacht championship and advanced to the All-Ireland qualifiers round 1.

=== Leinster Championship ===
Participating counties (10): Carlow, Dublin, Kildare, Kilkenny, Laois, Meath, Offaly, Westmeath, Wexford, Wicklow

Preliminary round: (2 matches): These are three matches between the first four teams drawn from the province of Leinster. Two teams are eliminated at this stage while the winners advance to the first round.

First round: (2 matches): The winners of the preliminary round matches join the two Leinster teams to make up the first round pairings. Two teams are eliminated at this stage while the winners advance to the quarter-finals.

Quarter-finals: (1 match): The winners of the two first round matches join two Leinster teams to make up the first round pairings. One team is eliminated at this stage while the winners advance to the semi-finals.

Semi-finals (2 matches): The winners of the quarter-finals join two teams to make up the semi-final pairings. Two teams are eliminated at this stage while the winners advance to the final.

Final: (1 match) The winners of the two semi-finals contest this game. One team is eliminated at this stage while the winners advance to the All-Ireland semi-finals.

=== Munster Championship ===
Participating counties (6): Clare, Cork, Kerry, Limerick, Tipperary, Waterford

Quarter-final (2 matches): These are two matches between the first four teams drawn from the province of Munster. Two teams are eliminated at this stage while the winners advance to the semi-finals.

Semi-finals (2 matches): The winners of the quarter-finals join the other two teams to make up the semi-final pairings. Two teams are eliminated at this stage while the winners advance to the final.

Final (1 match): The winner of the two semi-finals contest this game. One team is eliminated at this stage while the winners advance to the All-Ireland semi-finals.

=== Ulster Championship ===
Participating counties (5): Antrim, Derry, Down, London, New York

Quarter-final (1 match): This is a single match between the first two teams drawn from the province of Ulster and overseas teams. One team is eliminated at this stage while the winners advance to the semi-finals.

Semi-finals (2 matches): The winner of the lone quarter-final joins the other three Ulster teams to make up the semi-final pairings. Two teams are eliminated at this stage while the winners advance to the final.

Final (1 match): The winner of the two semi-finals contest this game. One team is eliminated at this stage while the winners advance to the All-Ireland quarter-finals.

=== All-Ireland Championship ===
Qualifiers round 1 (4 matches): The Ulster runners-up, Galway and the six other teams who failed to reach a provincial final to make up the qualifiers round 1 pairings. Four teams are eliminated at this stage while the winners advance to the qualifiers round 2.

Qualifiers round 2 (3 matches): The winners of the qualifiers round 1 join the Leinster and Munster runners-up to make up the qualifier round 2 pairings. Three teams are eliminated at this stage while the winners advance to the quarter-finals.

Quarter-finals (2 matches): The winners of the qualifiers round 2 join the Ulster champions to make up the quarter-final pairings. Teams who may have already met in the provincial championships are kept apart in separate quarter-finals. Two teams are eliminated at this stage while the winners advance to the semi-finals.

Semi-finals (2 matches): The winners of the quarter-finals join the Leinster and Munster champions to make up the semi-final pairings. Teams who have met in the provincial finals are kept apart in separate semi-finals. Two teams are eliminated at this stage while the winners advance to the final.

Final (1 match): The two winners of the semi-finals contest this game.

== Teams ==
=== General information ===
Twenty two counties will compete in the All-Ireland Senior Hurling Championship: one team in the Connacht Senior Hurling Championship, ten teams in the Leinster Senior Hurling Championship, six teams in the Munster Senior Hurling Championship and five teams in the Ulster Senior Hurling Championship.

County	Last provincial title	Last championship title	Position in 2003 Championship	Current championship
Antrim	2003	—	Quarter-finals	Ulster Senior Hurling Championship
Carlow	—	—	Qualifiers preliminary round	Leinster Senior Hurling Championship
Clare	1998	1997	Qualifiers round 1	Munster Senior Hurling Championship
Cork	2003	1999	Runners-up	Munster Senior Hurling Championship
Derry	2001	—	Qualifiers preliminary round	Ulster Senior Hurling Championship
Down	1997	—	Semi-finals (Ulster Senior Hurling Championship)	Ulster Senior Hurling Championship
Dublin	1961	1938	Qualifiers round 1	Leinster Senior Hurling Championship
Galway	1999	1988	Qualifiers round 2	Connacht Senior Hurling Championship
Kerry	1891	1891	Qualifiers round 1	Munster Senior Hurling Championship
Kildare	—	—	Preliminary quarter-finals (Leinster Senior Hurling Championship)	Leinster Senior Hurling Championship
Kilkenny	2003	2003	Champions	Leinster Senior Hurling Championship
Laois	1949	1915	Qualifiers round 1	Leinster Senior Hurling Championship
Limerick	1996	1973	Qualifiers round 2	Munster Senior Hurling Championship
London	—	1901	Quarter-finals (Ulster Senior Hurling Championship)	Ulster Senior Hurling Championship
Meath	—	—	Preliminary quarter-finals (Leinster Senior Hurling Championship)	Leinster Senior Hurling Championship
New York	—	—	Semi-finals (Ulster Senior Hurling Championship)	Ulster Senior Hurling Championship
Offaly	1995	1998	Quarter-finals	Leinster Senior Hurling Championship
Tipperary	2001	2001	Semi-finals	Munster Senior Hurling Championship
Waterford	2002	1959	Qualifiers round 2	Munster Senior Hurling Championship
Westmeath	—	—	Qualifiers preliminary round	Leinster Senior Hurling Championship
Wexford	1997	1996	Semi-finals	Leinster Senior Hurling Championship
Wicklow	—	—	Preliminary quarter-finals (Leinster Senior Hurling Championship)	Leinster Senior Hurling Championship

=== Calendar ===
Round	Date
Leinster Preliminary Round	Sunday 2 May 2004
Ulster Final	Sunday 6 June 2004
Ulster Final Replay	Sunday 13 June 2004
Munster Final	Sunday 27 June 2004
Leinster Final	Sunday 4 July 2004
All-Ireland Quarter-Finals	Sunday 25 July 2004
All-Ireland Quarter-Final Replay	Sunday 31 July 2004
All-Ireland Semi-Final	Sunday 8 August 2004
All-Ireland Semi-Final	Sunday 15 August 2004
All-Ireland Final	Sunday 12 September 2004

== Leinster Senior Hurling Championship ==
Preliminary round
Carlow	0–08
Laois	4–19
Westmeath	6–14
Wicklow	1–13

First round
Meath	0–08
Laois	1–13
Kildare	1–06
Westmeath	1–18

Quarter-finals
Offaly	2–23
Laois	1–15
Dublin	2–14
Westmeath	0–11

Semi-finals
Offaly	2–25
Dublin	1–13
Wexford	2–15
Kilkenny	1–16

Leinster final
Offaly	1–11
Wexford	2–12

=== Matches ===
2004-05-02
Preliminary Round

Carlow	0–8 – 4–19	Laois
Pat Coady 0–4 (3f); K English 0–2 (1f); F Foley 0–1 (pen); S M Murphy 0–1.	(report)	T Fitzgerald 1–3; Paul Cuddy 0–5 (4f, 1 '65); D Culleton, E Browne, E Jackman 1–0 each; E Meagher 0–3; D Rooney, F Keenan, D Walsh 0–2 each; J Fitzpatrick, J Walsh 0–1 each.

Dr. Cullen Park, Carlow
Referee: É. Morris (Dublin).

2004-05-02
Preliminary Round

Westmeath	6–14 – 1–13	Wicklow
A Mitchell 1–7 (0-5f), J Shaw 2–1 (0-1f), R Whelan 1–2, V Bateman 1–0, F Shaw 1–0, D Gallagher 0–1, B Kennedy 0–1, B Connaughton 0–1.	(report)	J O'Neill 1–11 (1–10 frees), T McGrath 0–1, G Doran 0–1.

Cusack Park, Mullingar
Referee: F Smith (Meath).

2004-05-15
1st Round

Westmeath	1–18 – 1–6	Kildare
D. McCormack 0–2, O. Devine 0–2, A. Mitchell 0–9 6fs, B. Kennedy 0–3, J. Forbes 1–2.	(report)	C. Divilly 0–1, J. Dempsey 1–1, A. Quinn 0–1, T. Carew 0-3fs

Cusack Park, Mullingar
Referee: J. Guinan (Kilkenny).

2004-05-16
1st Round

Laois	1–13 – 0–8	Meath
Paul Cuddy (0-1f), R Jones (0–4), J Young (1–6, 5f), E Meagher (0–1); T Fitzgerald (0–1).	(report)	S Reilly (0-1f), E Lynam (0–2), S Clynch (0–1), M Gannon (0–1), M Cole (0–3, 1f).

O'Moore Park, Portlaoise
Referee: J. Kelly (Wexford).

2004-05-29
Quarter-final

Offaly	2–23 – 1–15	Laois
C Cassidy (0–3 65s); M Cordial (0–1), G Hanniffy (0–1), B Murphy (1–2); B Carroll (1–4), J Brady (0–1), D Murray (0–10, 8f), S Whelahan (0–1).	(report)	J Fitzpatrick (0–1), D Cuddy (0–1), C Coonan (1–0), J Young (0–11, 9f, 1 65), R Jones (0–1), D Culleton (0–1).

O'Connor Park, Tullamore
Referee: S McMahon (Clare).

2004-06-13
Quarter-final

Dublin	2–14 – 0–11	Westmeath
C Keaney(1–2, 1 pen, 1 free), D O'Callaghan(1–1), D Curtain(0–3, 2 frees), L Ryan, P Fleury(0–2 each), M Carton, K Flynn, J McGurk, S O'Shea(0–1 each).	(report)	A Mitchell(0–5, 4 frees), E Loughlin(0–2), J Shaw, K Cosgrove, V Bateman, R Whelan(0–1 each).

Croke Park, Dublin
Referee: D. Kirwan (Cork).

2004-06-13
Semi-final

Wexford	2–15 – 1–16	Kilkenny
M. Jacob 1–2; R. Jacob 1–1; B. Lambert 0–4 (0–3 frees); M. Jordan 0–3; P. Carley 0–3 (0–2 frees); E. Quigley, A. Fenlon (sideline) 0–1 each.	(report)	H. Shefflin 0–5 (all frees); E. Brennan 1–1; T. Walsh 0–2; M. Comerford 0–2; S. Dowling, P. Barry (free), P. Tennyson, J. Hoyne, J. Coogan, DJ Carey, 0–1 each.

Croke Park, Dublin
Referee: B. Kelly (Westmeath).

2004-06-20
Semi-final

Offaly	2–25 – 1–13	Dublin
B. Murphy 2–5; D. Murray 0–8 (0–3 frees); B. Carroll 0–4; R. Hanniffy 0–3; M. Cordial 0–3; C. Cassidy 0–2 (frees).	(report)	D. O'Callaghan 0–5; M. Carton 1–0; K. Flynn 0–2; A. De Paor 0–2 (0–1 65); L. Ryan 0–2; D. Kirwan, D. Sweeney, 0–1 each.

Croke Park, Dublin
Referee: P. Ahern (Carlow).

2004-07-04
Final

Wexford	2–12 – 1–11	Offaly
P. Carley 1–1 (0–1 free); M. Jacob 1–0; E. Quigley 0–3; B. Lambert 0–3 frees; R. Jacob and P. Codd 0–2 each; A. Fenlon 0–1.	(report)	D. Murray 0–4 (0–3 frees); G. Hanniffy 1–0; B. Carroll 0–2; R. Hanniffy, M. Cordial, C. Cassidy (free), B. Murphy and Barry Whelahan 0–1 each.

Croke Park, Dublin
Referee: G. Harrington (Cork).

== Munster Senior Hurling Championship ==
Quarter-finals
Waterford	3–21
Clare	1–08
Cork	4–19
Kerry	1–07

Semi-finals
Waterford	4–10
Tipperary	3–12
Limerick	2–12
Cork	1–18

Final
Waterford	3–16
Cork	1–21

=== Matches ===
2004-05-16
Quarter-final

Waterford	3–21 – 1–8	Clare
D. Shanahan 3–1; E. Kelly 0–8 (0–4 frees) D. Bennett 0–5 frees; J. Mullane 0–4; P. Flynn, S. Prendergast, M. Walsh 0–1.	(report)	T. Griffin 1–0; N. Gilligan 0–4 (0–1 free); F. Lohan 0–3; C. Lynch 0–1.

Semple Stadium, Thurles
Referee: G. Harrington (Cork).

2004-05-16
Quarter-final

Cork	4–19 – 1–7	Kerry
J. Deane 1–4 (0–2 from frees); B. O'Connor 1–1 (0–1 from free); J. Gardiner 1–1; B. Corcoran 1–1; J. O'Connor 0–3; J. O'Callaghan 0–2; N. McCarthy 0–2; M. O'Connell 0–2 (0–1 from 65); T. McCarthy, J. Anderson and R. Curran (penalty) 0–1 each.	(report)	E. Tuohy 1–1; P. O'Connell 0–2 (0–1 from free); S. Brick 0–2 (0–2 from frees); J. Egan and J. McCarthy (free) 0–1 each.

Páirc Uí Chaoimh, Cork
Referee: B. Kelly (Westmeath).

2004-05-30
Semi-final

Limerick	2–12 – 1–18	Cork
N. Moran 0–7 (0–3 frees); S. O'Connor 2–0; P. Tobin 0–2; D. Sheehan, J.P. Sheahan and M. McKenna 0–1 each.	(report)	B. O'Connor 1–7 (1–6 frees, 0–1 65); J. Deane 0–4 (0–3 frees); N. McCarthy 0–3; T. McCarthy, M. O'Connell, J. O'Connor and B. Corcoran 0–1 each.

Gaelic Grounds, Limerick
Referee: S. Roche (Tipperary).

2004-06-06
Semi-final

Tipperary	3–12 – 4–10	Waterford
E. Kelly 2–8 (0–4 frees); C. Morrissey 1–1; P. Kelly (seventy), T. Dunne and S. Butler 0–1 each.	(report)	D. Shanahan 2–0; J. Mullane and P. O'Brien 1–0 each; S. Prendergast, D. Bennett (0–1 seventy), P. Flynn (0–1 free) and E. Kelly (0–1 free), 0–2 each; M. Walsh and E. McGrath 0–1 each.

Páirc Uí Chaoimh, Cork
Referee: G. Kirwan (Offaly).

2004-06-27
Final

Cork	1–21 – 3–16	Waterford
J. Deane 0–9 (0–6 frees); G. McCarthy 1–0; B. O'Connor 0–4 (0–1 free, 0–1 seventy); T. Kenny 0–3; B. Corcoran and J. O'Connor 0–2 each; R. Curran 0–1.	(report)	P. Flynn 1–7 (1–3 frees); D. Shanahan 1–3; E. Kelly 1–1; J. Mullane 0–2; D. Bennett (free), K. McGrath and S. Prendergast 0–1 each.

Semple Stadium, Thurles
Referee: S. McMahon (Clare).

== Ulster Senior Hurling Championship ==
Quarter-finals
London	0–12
Derry	2–14

Semi-finals
New York	1–09
Down	1–19
Antrim	2–14
Derry	0–12

Final
Down	1–19, 0–18
Antrim	1–19, 3–14

2004-05-16
Quarter-final

London	0–12 – 2–14	Derry
D Bourke 0–8 (0-8f), F McMahon, T Ó hAilpín, M Hayes (f), E Kinlon 0–1 each.	(report)	G McGonigle 1–4 (1-4f), K Hinphey 1–0, G Biggs (0–1 free), D McGrellis 0–3 each, G Biggs 0–2, P Kelly 0–1.

Emerald GAA Grounds, London
Referee: J. Sexton (Limerick

2004-05-23
Semi-final

New York	1–9 – 1–19	Down
B Kennedy 1–2 (1-0f, 0–1 sideline), V Norton, D Sims (both frees), T Moylan 0–2, S Quirke 0–1.	(report)	P Braniff 0–9 (0-1f), G Johnson 1–1, B McGourty 0–2, G Adare 0–2, M Coulter 0–2, S Wilson, G McGratton, M Braniff 0–1 each.

Gaelic Park, New York City

2004-05-23
Semi-final

Antrim	2–14 – 0–12	Derry
J Connolly 1–2, L Watson 0–4 (4f), B McFall 0–4 (3f), P Richmond 1–0, K McKeegan, L Richmond, C McGuickian, M Herron 0–1.	(report)	Greg Biggs 0–5 (3f), G McGonagle 0–3 (3f), K Hinphey 0–2, P Doherty, Gary Biggs 0–1.

Casement Park, Belfast
Referee: B. Gavin (Offaly).

2004-06-06
Final

Antrim	1–19 – 1–19	Down
B McFall 0–5 (0-2f), D Quinn 0–4, M Herron 1–1, P Richmond 0–3, K McKeegan 0–1 (0-1f), C McGuickian 0–1.	(report)	G Johnson 0–4 (0-2f), M Coulter 1–1 (1–0 pen), B McGourty 0–2, S Clarke 0–2 (0-2f), J Convery 0–1, G McGrattan 0–1, G Adair 0–1, A Savage 0–1.

Casement Park, Belfast
Referee: M. Haverty (Galway).

2004-06-13
Final
Replay

Antrim	3–14 – 0–18	Down
P Richmond 2–3, B McFall 1–3, L Watson 0–2, M Herron 0–2, C Herron, J Connolly, L Richmond, B Herron O-1 each.	(report)	S Clarke 0–6, B McGourty 0–4, J Convery, G Johnson 0–2 each, G Adair, A Savage, M Coulter, S Wilson 0–1 each.

Casement Park, Belfast
Referee: É. Morris (Dublin).

== All-Ireland qualifiers ==
=== Round 1 ===
2004-06-26
Round 1

Tipperary	3–10 – 2–12	Limerick
S. Butler 1–3; T. Dunne 1–1 (0–1 free); J. Carroll 1–0; C. Morrissey 0–2; E. Kelly 0–3 (0–2 frees); B. Dunne 0–1.	(report)	A. O'Shaughnessy 2–1; N. Moran 0–7 (0–4 frees, 0–2 65's); M. Foley, J. O'Brien, P. Tobin, D. O'Grady, 0–1 each.

Gaelic Grounds, Limerick
Attendance: 26,600
Referee: A. Mac Suibhne (Dublin)

2004-06-26
Round 1

Clare	7–19 – 2–15	Laois
T Griffin 4–1, N Gilligan 2–10 (0-5f), T Carmody 1–0, D Forde 0–3, B Murphy 0–2, G Quinn S McMahon, F Lohan 0–1 each.	(report)	J Young 0–6 (5f), T Fitzgerald 1–2, R Coonan 1–0, D Cuddy 0–3, P Mahon, C Cuddy, J Dunne, R Jones 0–1 each.

Gaelic Grounds, Limerick
Referee: M. Haverty (Galway)

2004-06-26
Round 1

Kilkenny	4–22 – 0–8	Dublin
D Lyng (0–1), M Comerford (0–2), J Coogan (1–2), E Brennan (1–3); DJ Carey (0–4; 1f, 1 65), H Shefflin (2–8; 0-6f), J Fitzpatrick (0–1), J Maher (0–1).	(report)	R Fallon (0–1), A de Paor (0–3; 0-2f, 1 65), S O'Shea (0–1), D O'Callaghan (0–2; 0-2f), G O'Mara (0–1).

Dr. Cullen Park, Carlow
Referee: S. Roche (Tipperary)

2004-06-26
Round 1

Down	1–14 – 5–19	Galway
S Clarke 0–5 (4f), M Coulter 1–2 (0-1f), A Savage, B McGourty, G Johnson (1f) 0–2 each, G McGrattan 0–1.	(report)	E Cloonan (4–7, 1-4f), A Kerins 1–2, D Forde 0–3, D Tierney (1f), Damien Hayes, David Hayes 0–2 each, K Broderick, M Kerins 0–1 each.

McKenna Park, Ballycran
Referee: P. Horan (Offaly)

=== Round 2 ===
2004-07-10
Round 2

Cork	2–19 – 1–16	Tipperary
J. Deane 0–7 (0–6 frees); N. McCarthy 1–2; T. McCarthy 1–1; B. O'Connor 0–4 (0–2 frees); K. Murphy 0–2; J. O'Connor, J. Gardiner and M. O'Connell 0–1 each.	(report)	E. Kelly 0–9 (0–6 frees); P. Kelly 1–0; B. Dunne 0–3; C. Gleeson, C. Morrissey, J. Carroll and M. O'Leary 0–1 each.

FitzGerald Stadium, Killarney
Referee: B. Kelly (Westmeath)

2004-07-11
Round 2

Kilkenny	4–20 – 1–10	Galway
H. Shefflin 2–11 (1–9 frees); E. Brennan 1–3; J. Hoyne 1–0; M. Comerford 0–2; D.J. Carey (free), R. Mullally, D. Lyng and C. Phelan 0–1 each.	(report)	E. Cloonan 0–7 (0–5 frees, 0–1 '65); D. Hayes 1–2; K. Broderick 0–1.

Semple Stadium, Thurles
Referee: D. Kirwan (Cork)

2004-07-17
Round 2

Clare	3–16 – 2–10	Offaly
N Gilligan 2–7 (1–4 frees), T Griffin 1–2, A Quinn, D Forde 0–2 each, D O'Connell, C Lynch, T Carmody 0–1 each.	(report)	R Hanniffy 1–2, D Murray 1–3 (1–3 frees), B Murphy, G Hanniffy, B Whelahan, D Hayden, M Cordial 0–1 each.

Gaelic Grounds, Limerick
Referee: P. O'Connor (Limerick)

== All-Ireland Senior Hurling Championship ==
=== Bracket ===
Teams in bold advanced to the next round. The provincial champions are marked by an asterisk.

**Quarter-finals**; 25 / 31 July
**Cork**	**2–26**
Antrim*	0–10
**Kilkenny**	1–13, **1–11**
Clare	1–13, 0–09

**Semi-finals**; 8 / 15 August
Wexford*	0–12
**Cork**	**1–27**
Waterford*	0–18
**Kilkenny**	**3–12**

**All-Ireland final** 12 September
**Cork**	**0–17**
Kilkenny	0–09

=== All-Ireland quarter-finals ===
July 25
Quarter-final

Cork	2–26 – 0–10	Antrim
B. Corcoran 2–1, J. O'Connor, J. O'Callaghan, J. Deane (0–3 frees) 0–4 each, B. O'Connor 0–3 (0–2 frees), T. McCarthy, M. O'Connell, N. McCarthy, J. Anderson 0–2 each, K. Murphy, J. Gardiner (65) 0–1 each.	Report	B. McFall 0–4 (0–2 from sideline cuts; 0–1 free), P. Richmond 0–3, M. McCambridge, C. McGuckian, D. Quinn 0–1 each.

Croke Park, Dublin
Referee: A. Mac Suibhne (Dublin)

July 25
Quarter-final

Kilkenny	1–13 – 1–13	Clare
H. Shefflin 0–9 (0–7 frees); J. Hoyne 1–0; P. Tennyson, J. Coogan, D.J. Carey (free) and S. Dowling 0–1 each.	Report	N. Gilligan 1–7 (1–5 frees); S. McMahon 0–3 (0–2 seventies); A. Quinn, D. McMahon and J. O’Connor 0–1 each.

Croke Park, Dublin
Referee: G Harrington

July 31
Quarter-final replay

Kilkenny	1–11 – 0–09	Clare
E. Brennan 1–2; D.J. Carey 0–3 (0–1 free, 0–1 seventy; H. Shefflin 0–3 frees; M. Comerford 0–2; J. Hoyne 0–1.	Report	N. Gilligan 0–3 frees; J. O'Connor 0–2; S. McMahon 0–2 frees; T. Griffin and D. Forde 0–1 each.

Semple Stadium, Thurles
Referee: P. Horan (Offaly)

=== All-Ireland semi-finals ===
August 8
Semi-final

Kilkenny	3–12 – 0–18	Waterford
H. Shefflin 2–4 (0–4 frees); E. Brennan 1–1; M. Comerford 0–3; D.J. Carey 0–2 (0–1 free); K. Coogan and C. Fitzpatrick 0–1 each.	Report	P. Flynn 0–13 (0–8 frees, 0–1 '65); J. Kennedy 0–3; E. Kelly and M. Walsh 0–1 each.

Croke Park, Dublin
Attendance: 51,263
Referee: A. Mac Suibhne (Dublin)

August 15
Semi-final

Cork	1–27 – 0–12	Wexford
B. O’Connor 0–8 (0–5 frees, 0–1 ’65); J. O’Connor 0–6; T. Kenny 1–1; J. Deane 0–4 (0–1 free); N. McCarthy, T. McCarthy and J. O’Callaghan 0–2 each; K. Murphy and M. O’Connell 0–1 each.	Report	T. Mahon, P. Codd, M. Jordan, D. Ruth (0–1 free, 0–1 ’65), P. Carley (0–2 frees), 0–2 each; E. Quigley and M. Travers 0–1 each.

Croke Park, Dublin
Attendance: 63,223
Referee: B. Kelly (Westmeath)

=== All-Ireland final ===
September 12
Final

Cork	0–17 – 0–09	Kilkenny
J. Deane (0–5), B. O'Connor (0–3), N. McCarthy (0–3), K. Murphy (0–2), B. Corcoran (0–2), T. Kenny (0–1), J. O'Connor (0–1).	Report	H. Shefflin (0–5), M. Comerford (0–2), D. Lyng (0–1), J. Fitzpatrick (0–1).

Croke Park, Dublin
Attendance: 78,212
Referee: A. Mac Suibhne (Dublin)

== Championship statistics ==
=== Scoring ===
- First goal of the championship: Damien Culleton for Laois against Carlow (Leinster preliminary round)
- Last goal of the championship: Tom Kenny for Cork against Wexford (All-Ireland semi-final)
- First hat-trick of the championship: Dan Shanahan for Waterford against Clare (Munster quarter-final)
- Most goals in a match: 9
  - Clare 7–19 – 2–15 Laois (All-Ireland qualifier)
- Most points in a match: 39
  - Cork 1–27 – 0–12 Wexford (All-Ireland semi-final)
- Most goals by one team in a match: 7
  - Clare 7–19 – 2–15 Laois (All-Ireland qualifier)
- Most points by one team in a match: 27
  - Cork 1–27 – 0–12 Wexford (All-Ireland semi-final)
- Most goals scored by a losing team: 3
  - Tipperary 3–12 – 4–10 Waterford (Munster semi-final)
- Most points scored by a losing team: 21
  - Cork 1–21 – 3–16 Waterford (Munster final)

== Miscellaneous ==
- The round one qualifier between Galway and Down was the first ever championship meeting between these two teams.
- The round one qualifier between Clare and Laois was the first championship meeting between these two teams since the All-Ireland final of 1914. Clare were the winners on both occasions.
- The All-Ireland final was, for the first time, contested by two teams, neither of which were their respective provincial champions. Cork were defeated in the Munster final while Kilkenny were defeated in the Leinster semi-final.
- The All-Ireland final was decided for only the second time in history with both sides failing to score a goal, the first being in the 1999 final.

== See also ==
- 2004 All-Ireland Senior B Hurling Championship
- 2004 All-Ireland Intermediate Hurling Championship
- 2004 All-Ireland Junior Hurling Championship

== Top scorers ==
=== Season ===
Rank	Player	County	Tally	Total	Matches	Average
1	Henry Shefflin	Kilkenny	6–45	63	7	9.00
2	Niall Gilligan	Clare	5–31	46	5	9.20
3	Joe Deane	Cork	1–36	39	7	5.57
4	Ben O'Connor	Cork	2–30	36	7	5.14
5	Eugene Cloonan	Galway	4–14	26	2	13.00
5	Eoin Kelly	Tipperary	2–20	26	3	8.66
5	Paul Flynn	Waterford	1–23	26	4	6.50

=== Single game ===
Rank	Player	County	Tally	Total	Opposition
1	Eugene Cloonan	Galway	4–7	19	Down
2	Henry Shefflin	Kilkenny	2–11	17	Galway
3	Niall Gilligan	Clare	2–10	16	Laois
4	Henry Shefflin	Kilkenny	2–8	14	Dublin
4	Eoin Kelly	Tipperary	2–8	14	Waterford
4	Jonathan O'Neill	Wicklow	1–11	14	Westmeath
7	Tony Griffin	Clare	4–1	13	Laois
7	Niall Gilligan	Clare	2–7	13	Offaly
7	Paul Flynn	Waterford	0–13	13	Kilkenny
10	Brendan Murphy	Offaly	2–5	11	Dublin
10	James Young	Laois	0–11	11	Offaly
12	Dan Shanahan	Waterford	3–1	10	Clare
12	Henry Shefflin	Kilkenny	2–4	10	Waterford
12	Paul Flynn	Waterford	1–7	10	Cork
12	Andrew Mitchell	Westmeath	1–7	10	Wicklow
12	Niall Gilligan	Clare	1–7	10	Kilkenny
12	Ben O'Connor	Cork	1–7	10	Limerick
18	Paddy Richmond	Antrim	2–3	9	Down
18	James Young	Laois	1–6	9	Meath
18	Joe Deane	Cork	0–9	9	Waterford
18	Andrew Mitchell	Westmeath	0–9	9	Kildare
18	Paul Braniff	Down	0–9	9	New York
18	Eoin Kelly	Tipperary	0–9	9	Cork
18	Henry Shefflin	Kilkenny	0–9	9	Clare
