= James Young (hurler) =

Irish hurler

Personal information
- Born: Ireland

Sport
- Sport: Hurling
- Position: Forward
Club
- Years: Club
- ? -?: Clonaslee–St Manman's
Inter-county*
Years	County	Apps (scores)
2000–2009	Laois	31 (8-187)
- *Inter County team apps and scores correct as of 13 August 2010.

James Young is an Irish hurler from County Laois.

He plays for the Clonaslee–St Manman's club and was a regular on the senior Laois county team, for whom he was regularly one of the highest scoring players in the country.

In 2006, James received a nomination for an All-Star award.

In 2007, he was nominated for the Vodafone GAA Hurling All Stars awards.

In 2009, he announced his retirement from the sport.

== Championship appearances ==
#	Date	Venue	Opponent	Score	Result	Competition	Match report
1	7 May 2000	Cusack Park, Mullingar	Westmeath	1–3	3-18 : 2–8	Leinster Round Robin	Irish Independent
2	17 May 2000	Dr. Cullen Park, Carlow	Carlow	0–1	2-16 : 1–10	Leinster Round Robin	Irish Independent
3	28 May 2000	Nowlan Park, Kilkenny	Dublin	0–1	0-18 : 0–18	Leinster Round Robin play-off	Irish Independent
4	5 June 2000	O'Connor Park, Tullamore	Dublin	0–1	1-14 : 2–15	Leinster Round Robin play-off replay	Irish Independent
5	7 May 2001	O'Connor Park, Tullamore	Meath	1–1	3-16 : 1–7	Leinster First Round	Irish Independent
6	20 May 2001	Nowlan Park, Kilkenny	Dublin	0–0	1-15 : 2–11	Leinster Quarter-final	Irish Independent
7	10 June 2001	Croke Park, Dublin	Wexford	0–1	0-17 : 0–10	Leinster Semi-final	Irish Independent
8	5 May 2003	O'Moore Park, Portlaoise	Wicklow	0–7	2-22 : 0–10	Leinster Preliminary Round Quarter-final	Irish Independent
9	10 May 2003	O'Moore Park, Portlaoise	Carlow	0–4	5-15 : 1–10	Leinster Preliminary Round Semi-final	Irish Independent
10	24 May 2003	Nowlan Park, Kilkenny	Dublin	0–11	2-15 : 1–18	Leinster Preliminary Round Final	Irish Independent
11	31 May 2003	O'Moore Park, Portlaoise	Dublin	0–8	0-15 : 3–11	Leinster Preliminary Round Final Replay	Irish Independent
12	14 June 2003	O'Moore Park, Portlaoise	Tipperary	0–5	0-13 : 3-28	All-Ireland Qualifiers	Irish Independent
13	16 May 2004	O'Moore Park, Portlaoise	Meath	1–6	1-13 : 0–8	Leinster Preliminary Round	Irish Independent
14	29 May 2004	O'Connor Park, Offaly	Offaly	0–11	1-15 : 2-23	Leinster Quarter-final	Irish Independent
15	26 June 2004	Gaelic Grounds, Limerick	Clare	0–6	2-15 : 7–19	Qualifiers	Irish Independent
16	22 May 2005	Nowlan Park, Kilkenny	Dublin	1–9	4-14 : 0–14	Leinster Quarter-final	Irish Independent
17	12 June 2005	Croke Park, Dublin	Wexford	0–7	1-10 : 0-24	Leinster Semi-final	Irish Independent
18	18 June 2005	O'Moore Park, Portlaoise	Galway	0–6	2-11 : 2-22	Qualifier	Irish Independent
19	1 July 2005	O'Moore Park, Portlaoise	Limerick	1–5	1-9 : 2–15	Qualifier	Irish Independent
20	9 July 2005	Casement Park, Belfast	Antrim	0–8	0-21 : 1–16	Qualifiers	Irish Independent
21	23 July 2005	Dr. Cullen Park, Carlow	Dublin	0–7	1-10 : 3–13	Relegation Semi-final	Irish Independent
22	30 July 2005	Páirc Tailteann, Navan	Antrim	0–11	1-23 : 1–15	Relegation Final	Irish Independent
23	21 May 2006	O'Moore Park, Portlaoise	Offaly	0–4	0-8 : 2–12	Leinster First Round	Irish Independent
24	17 June 2006	O'Moore Park, Portlaoise	Galway	0–8	2-13 : 7-28	Qualifiers	Irish Independent
25	1 July 2006	Cusack Park, Mullingar	Westmeath	1–13	2-15 : 2–9	Qualifiers	Irish Independent
26	8 July 2006	O'Moore Park, Portlaoise	Waterford	0–8	1-13 : 2–17	Qualifiers	Irish Independent
27	27 May 2007	O'Connor Park, Tullamore	Offaly	0–8	0-10 : 1-26	Leinster First Round	Irish Independent
28	30 June 2007	O'Moore Park, Portlaoise	Galway	1–8	1-14 : 3-20	Qualifiers	Irish Independent
29	7 July 2007	Casement Park, Belfast	Antrim	0–9	1-13 : 1-23	Qualifiers	Irish Independent
30	14 July 2007	O'Moore Park, Portlaoise	Clare	1–7	1-11 : 2–14	Qualifiers	Irish Independent
31	31 May 2009	O'Moore Park, Portlaoise	Galway	0–3	0-17: 5-29	Leinster Quarter-final	Irish Independent
