= Ger Farragher =

Galway hurler

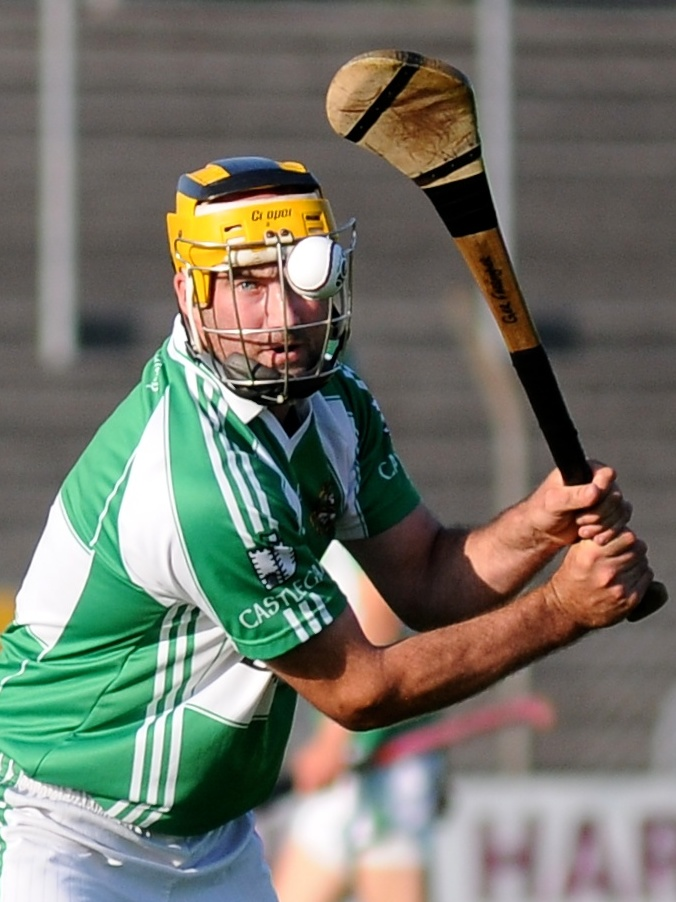

Personal information
- Born: 10 June 1983 (age 43) Galway, Ireland
- Height: 1.8 m (5 ft 11 in)

Sport
- Sport: Hurling
- Position: Midfield
Club
- Years: Club
- 1999–: Castlegar
Inter-county
Years	County	Apps (scores)
2002–2011	Galway	33 (6–127)
Inter-county titles
- NHL: 1
- All Stars: 1

Ger Farragher (born 10 June 1983) is an Irish sportsman. A hurler, he played at senior level in the forward line on the Galway county team. He plays his club hurling with Castlegar.

Farragher was born in Galway in 1983 and has had much success in the game of hurling. At inter-county level he has won 2 back-to-back minor All-Ireland medals in 1999 and 2000. In 2002 he made his senior championship debut and has gone on to be one of the game's most prolific scorers. Farragher also has an All-Ireland senior hurling runner-up medal from 2005 when he was the top-scorer in the championship. He has also played on Institute of Technology, Sligo's Ryan Cup team. In 2005 Farragher claimed his first All-Star Award.

In 2010, Farragher was named Opel GPA player of the League for his performance in the National Hurling League that year.

Farragher also played soccer with Oranbay 90 (now incorporated in Maree Oranmore FC) in the Galway FA leagues. Farragher usually operated as a winger for the Maree Oranmore outfit

== Career statistics ==
Team	Year	National League			Leinster		All-Ireland		Total	
Team	Year	Division	Apps	Score	Apps	Score	Apps	Score	Apps	Score
Galway	2002	Division 1A	0	0-00	0	0-00	2	0-01	2	0-01
Galway	2003	Division 1A	2	0-00	0	0-00	0	0-00	2	0-00
Galway	2004	Division 1A	0	0-00	0	0-00	0	0-00	0	0-00
Galway	2005	Division 1A	7	2-54	0	0-00	6	3-57	13	5-111
Galway	2006	Division 1B	5	2-31	0	0-00	4	1-22	9	3-53
Galway	2007	Division 1B	4	0-00	0	0-00	0	0-00	4	0-00
Galway	2008	Division 1B	7	4-53	0	0-00	2	0-04	9	4-57
Galway	2009	Division 1	4	0-10	0	0-00	3	0-03	7	0-13
Galway	2010	Division 1	7	0-44	4	1-28	1	0-02	12	1-74
Galway	2011	Division 1	6	0-44	0	0-00	3	0-10	9	0-54
Total			42	8-236	4	1-28	21	4-99	67	13-363
