= Niall Gilligan =

Irish hurler

Personal information
- Native name: Niall Mac Giollagáin (Irish)
- Nickname: Gilly
- Born: 12 August 1976 (age 50) Sixmilebridge, County Clare, Ireland
- Occupation: Auctioneer
- Height: 6 ft 1 in (185 cm)

Sport
- Sport: Hurling
- Position: Left corner-forward
Club
- Years: Club
- 1996–2019: Sixmilebridge
Club titles
- Clare titles: 7
- Munster titles: 2
- All-Ireland Titles: 1
Inter-county*
Years	County	Apps (scores)
1997–2009	Clare	56 (21–197)
Inter-county titles
- Munster titles: 2
- All-Irelands: 1
- NHL: 0
- All Stars: 1
- *Inter County team apps and scores correct as of 03:04, 9 June 2017.

Niall Gilligan (born 12 August 1976) is an Irish hurler who usually played as a right corner-forward for the Clare senior team.

Born in Sixmilebridge, County Clare, Gilligan first played competitive hurling whilst at school in St. Flannan's College. He arrived on the inter-county scene when he first linked up with the Clare under-21 team. He made his senior debut in the 1997 championship. Gilligan went on to play a key part for Clare for fourteen seasons, and won one All-Ireland medal and two Munster medals. He was an All-Ireland runner-up on one occasion.

As a member of the Munster inter-provincial team on a number of occasions, Gilligan won four Railway Cup medals. At club level he won one All-Ireland medal, one Munster medal and three championship medals with Sixmilebridge.

Gilligan's career tally of 20 goals and 197 points marks him out as Clare's top championship scorer.

Throughout his career Gilligan made 56 championship appearances, marking him out as Clare's most "capped" player of all time. He announced his retirement from inter-county hurling on 5 January 2010.

Even during his playing days Gilligan became involved in team management and coaching. He has been a selector with the Sixmilebridge senior, under-21 and under-15 teams, while he was manager of the Sixmilebridge under-21 team that claimed championship honours in 2013.

Gilligan retired from hurling on 3 November 2019, as Sixmilebridge were defeated by Ballygunner in the 2019 Munster Senior Club Hurling Championship.

== Playing career ==
=== Club ===
Gilligan plays for Sixmilebridge. He helped the club to an All Ireland Club title in 1996, where he appeared as a substitute. He won further Clare titles in 2000 and 2002, and a Munster Senior Club Hurling title in 2002. In 2013 after and 11-year gap he added a 4th title to his collection. In 2015, he won his 5th county title after a 1–21 to 0–15 win against Clonlara in the final.

=== Inter-county ===
Gilligan made his debut for Clare in 1997, helping Clare to their 3rd All Ireland title. He won another Munster medal in 1998, and contested the Munster final in 1999 and 2008. He also won an All Star in 1999. In January 2010, Gilligan announced his retirement from inter-county hurling.

In 2011, Gillgan played with the Clare Intermediate team in the Munster Intermediate Hurling Championship where he scored 1–5 against Cork in the semi-final. He later helped Clare to their first ever Munster title when they beat Limerick in the final. In the semi-final Clare overcame Galway helped by 0–08 from Gilligan. They went on to win a first All-Ireland Intermediate Hurling Championship when they beat Kilkenny in the final, he scored 0–03 in the game.

== Career statistics ==
Team	Year	National League			Munster		All-Ireland		Total	
Team	Year	Division	Apps	Score	Apps	Score	Apps	Score	Apps	Score
Clare	1997	Division 1	5	2–12	2	0–05	2	0–05	9	2–22
Clare	1998	Division 1A	6	1–16	3	1–05	3	0–01	12	2–22
Clare	1999	Division 1A	6	1–11	3	0–05	3	3–07	12	4–23
Clare	2000	Division 1A	3	2–04	1	0–02	0	0–00	4	2–06
Clare	2001	Division 1A	4	2–17	1	0–00	0	0–00	5	2–17
Clare	2002	Division 1A	3	0–05	1	0–01	5	3–11	9	3–17
Clare	2003	Division 1A	8	5–45	2	0–10	1	0–06	11	5–61
Clare	2004	Division 1A	7	5–33	1	0–04	4	5–27	12	10–64
Clare	2005	Division 1A	8	4–47	1	0–05	5	0–28	0	0–00
Clare	2006	Division 1A	4	1–18	1	0–06	5	3–20	10	4–44
Clare	2007	Division 1A	5	0–13	1	1–01	4	2–15	10	3–29
Clare	2008	Division 1B	5	0–08	3	1–13	1	0–08	9	1–29
Clare	2009	Division 1	5	0–12	1	0–00	2	1–12	8	1–24
Total			69	23–241	21	3–57	35	17–140	125	43–438

== Honours ==
Clare

- All-Ireland Senior Hurling Championship (1) : 1997
- Munster Senior Hurling Championship (2) : 1997, 1998
- Munster Intermediate Hurling Championship (1) : 2011
- All-Ireland Intermediate Hurling Championship (1) : 2011

Interprocincial

- Interprovincial Championship (3): 1997, 2005, 2007

Sixmilebridge

- Clare Senior Hurling Championship (7) : 1995, 2000, 2002, 2013, 2015, 2017, 2019
- Munster Senior Club Championship (2) : 1995, 2000
- All-Ireland Senior Club Hurling Championship (1); 1996
- Clare County Hurling Leagues (4): 2000, 2004, 2010, 2013

== Individual ==
Awards

- All-Star Award (1) : 1999
