= 2009 Inter-Provincial Hurling Championship =

- Dates: 21 February – 14 March 2009
- Teams: Connacht; Leinster; Munster; Ulster
- Champions: Leinster (27th title)

Tournament statistics
- Matches played: 3
- Top scorer(s): Niall Healy (1–13)

The 2009 Interprovincial Hurling Championship, known as the 2009 M Donnelly Hurling Interprovincial Championship due to the tournament's sponsorship by businessman Martin Donnelly, was the 82nd series of the Interprovincial Championship. The annual hurling championship between the four historic provinces of Ireland was contested by Connacht, Leinster, Munster and Ulster. The championship was won by Leinster.

== Participants ==
The teams involved are:

Province	Manager
Connacht	John McIntyre
Leinster	John Conran
Muntser	Len Gaynor
Ulster	Dominic McKinley; Terence McNaughton

== Results ==
=== Interprovincial Championship ===
21 February
Semi-final

Connacht	2–20 – 2–18	Munster
N Healy (1–6); A Callanan (1–2); K Hynes (0–2); C Donnellan (0–2); A Coen (0–2); M Ryan (0–1); B Burke (0–1); A Cullinane (0–1); K Raymond (0–1); K Hooban (0–1); J Gantley (0–1)	Report	A O’Shaughnessy (0–6); P Kelly (1–2); K McGrath (1–1); S Prendergast (0–3); T Griffin (0–3); S McGrath (0–1); S Molumphy (0–1); J Clancy (0–1)

Pearse Stadium, Galway
Referee: F Smith (Meath)

GK	1	Eric Ward
RCB	2	Martin Ryan
FB	3	Damien McClearn
LCB	4	Fergal Moore
RWB	5	Andy Coen
CB	6	Brian Costello
LWB	7	Brian Burke
MD	8	Adrian Cullinane
MD	9	Keith Raymond	(substituted off) 58'
RWF	10	Mark Kerins	(substituted off) 43'
CF	11	Paul Killilea	(substituted off) 37'
LWF	12	Kevin Hooban	(substituted off) 50'
RCF	13	Niall Healy
CF	14	Joe Gantley
LCF	15	Aonghus Callanan
Substitutes used:
		Kevin Hynes	(substituted in) 37'
		Cyril Donnellan	(substituted in) 43'
		Richie Murray	(substituted in) 50'
		Fergal Healy	(substituted in) 58'

GK	1	Brendan Cummins
RCB	2	Conor O'Brien
FB	3	Declan Prendergast
LCB	4	Eoin Murphy	(substituted off) 29'
RWB	5	Benny Dunne
CB	6	Michael Walsh
LWB	7	Séamus Hickey
MD	8	Shane McGrath	(substituted off) 52'
MD	9	Donal O'Grady	(substituted off) 35'
RWF	10	Séamus Prendergast
CF	11	Ken McGrath
LWF	12	Tony Griffin
RCF	13	Andrew O'Shaughnessy
CF	14	Stephen Molumphy
LCF	15	Paul Kelly	(substituted off) 50'
Substitutes used:
		Diarmaid FitzGerald	(substituted in) 29'
		James Woodlock	(substituted in) 35'
		Jonathan Clancy	(substituted in) 50'
		Shane O'Sullivan	(substituted in) 52'

21 February
Semi-final

Ulster	0–8 – 4–14	Leinster
P Shiels (0–4); B McGourtey (0–2); K Hinphey (0–1); K Stewart (0–1)	Report	E Brennan (2–0); A Fogarty (1–3); J Bergin (1–2); D Lyng (0–4); M Rice (0–2); R Hanniffy (0–1); E Quigley (0–1); B Carroll (0–1)

Casement Park, Belfast
Referee: D Richardson (Limerick)

GK	1	Ryan McGarry
RCB	2	Kieran McGourty
FB	3	Neil McGarry
LCB	4	Mark Craig
RWB	5	Ciaran Herron
CB	6	Liam Hinphey
LWB	7	Johnny Campbell
MD	8	Andy Savage
MD	9	Benny Herron
RWF	10	Kevin Hinphey
CF	11	Brian McGourty
LWF	12	Paul Braniff
RCF	13	P. J. O'Connell
CF	14	Karl Stewart
LCF	15	Paul Shiels
Substitutes used:
		Eddie McCloskey
		Neil McAuley
		Ruairí Convery

GK	1	P. J. Ryan
RCB	2	David Franks
FB	3	David Kenny
LCB	4	Jackie Tyrrell
RWB	5	Tommy Walsh
CB	6	J. J. Delaney
LWB	7	Michael Jacob
MD	8	Rory Hanniffy
MD	9	Colm Farrell
RWF	10	Alan McCrabbe
CF	11	Eoin Quigley
LWF	12	Derek Lyng
RCF	13	Aidan Fogarty
CF	14	Joe Bergin
LCF	15	Eddie Brennan
Substitutes used:
		Michael Rice
		Stephen Clynch
		Stephen Hiney
		David O'Callaghan
		Brian Carroll

14 March
Final

Leinster	3–18 – 1–17	Connacht
H Shefflin (1–6); D Lyng (1–2); J Bergin (1–1); E Brennan (0–3); D O'Callaghan (0–2); E Quigley (0–2); A Fogarty (0–1); R Hanniffy (0–1).	Report	N Healy (0–7); R Murray (1–1); A Callanan (0–2); A Cullinane (0–2); K Holohan (0–2); C Donnellan (0–1); J Gantley (0–1); K Raymond (0–1)

Ghantoot Racing and Polo Club, Abu Dhabi
Referee: M. Wadding (Waterford)

GK	1	P. J. Ryan
RCB	2	David Franks
FB	3	David Kenny
LCB	4	Jackie Tyrrell
RWB	5	Tommy Walsh
CB	6	J. J. Delaney (c)
LWB	7	Michael Jacob
MD	8	Rory Hanniffy	(substituted off) 54'
MD	9	Eoin Quigley
RWF	10	Michael Rice	(substituted off) 60'
CF	11	Henry Shefflin
LWF	12	Derek Lyng	(substituted off) 60'
RCF	13	David O'Callaghan	(substituted off) 45'
CF	14	Joe Bergin
LCF	15	Eddie Brennan
Substitutes used:
		Aidan Fogarty	(substituted in) 45'
		Colm Farrell	(substituted in) 54'
		Alan McCrabbe	(substituted in) 60'
		Stephen Clynch	(substituted in) 60'

GK	1	Colm Callanan
RCB	2	Martin Ryan
FB	3	Damien McClearn
LCB	4	Ciarán O'Donovan	(substituted off) 26'
RWB	5	Andy Coen (c)	(substituted off) 59'
CB	6	Brian Costello
LWB	7	Ger Mahon
MD	8	Adrian Cullinane
MD	9	Keith Raymond	(substituted off) 41'
RWF	10	Paul Killilea	(substituted off) 38'
CF	11	Mark Kerins
LWF	12	Kevin Hooban	(substituted off) 47'
RCF	13	Niall Healy
FF	14	Richie Murray
LCF	15	Aonghus Callanan
Substitutes used:
		Brian Burke	(substituted in) 26'
		Cyril Donnellan	(substituted in) 38'
		Fergal Healy	(substituted in) 41'
		Joe Gantley	(substituted in) 47'
		Mike Keaveney	(substituted in) 59'

== Top scorers ==
=== Championship ===
Rank	Player	County	Tally	Total	Matches	Average
1	Niall Healy	Connacht	1–13	16	2	8.00
2	Eddie Brennan	Leinster	2–3	9	2	4.50
2	Henry Shefflin	Leinster	1–6	9	1	9.00

=== Single game ===
Rank	Player	County	Tally	Total	Opposition
1	Niall Healy	Connacht	1–6	9	Munster
1	Henry Shefflin	Leinster	1–6	9	Connacht
3	Niall Healy	Connacht	0–7	7	Leinster
4	Eddie Brennan	Leinster	2–0	6	Ulster
4	Aidan Fogarty	Leinster	1–3	6	Ulster
4	Andrew O'Shaughnessy	Munster	0–6	6	Connacht
7	Aonghus Callanan	Connacht	1–2	5	Munster
7	Joe Bergin	Leinster	1–2	5	Ulster
7	Derek Lyng	Leinster	1–2	5	Connacht
7	Paul Kelly	Munster	1–2	5	Connacht

== Sources ==
- Donegan, Des, The Complete Handbook of Gaelic Games (DBA Publications Limited, 2005).
