= 2006 Inter-Provincial Hurling Championship =

2006 Interprovincial Hurling Championship
- Dates: 14 October – 28 October 2006
- Teams: Connacht; Leinster; Munster; Ulster
- Champions: Leinster

Tournament statistics
- Matches played: 3
- Goals scored: 6 (2 per match)
- Points scored: 104 (34.67 per match)
- Top scorer(s): Eugene Cloonan (2-15)

The 2006 Interprovincial Hurling Championship, known as the 2006 M Donnelly Hurling Interprovincial Championship due to the tournament's sponsorship by businessman Martin Donnelly, was the 79th series of the Interprovincial Championship. The annual hurling championship between the four historic provinces of Ireland was contested by Connacht, Leinster, Munster and Ulster. The championship was won by Leinster.

== Results ==
=== Inter provincial Championship ===
October 14
Semi-final

Leinster	2-19 - 0-12	Ulster
D Franks (0-6); A Fogarty (1-2); R Power (0-4); J Bergin (1-0); R McCarthy (0-3); J McCaffrey (0-2); Diarmuid Lyng (0-1); E Brennan (0-1)	Report	J McIntosh (0-10); S McBride (0-1); R Convery (0-1)

Parnell Park, Dublin
Referee: M Haverty (Galway)

October 15
Semi-final

Munster	1-16 - 2-17	Connacht
E Kelly (1-6); P Kelly (0-3); N Gilligan (0-2); T Carmody (0-2); A O'Shaughnessy (0-1); M Walsh (0-1); N Moran (0-1)	Report	E Cloonan (2-6); R Murray (0-3); D Tierney (0-2); G Farragher (0-1); K Broderick (0-1); T Óg Regan (0-1); A Kerins (0-1); D Collins (0-1); F Healy (0-1)

Cusack Park, Ennis
Referee: B Gavin (Offaly)

October 28
Final

Connacht	0-17 - 1-23	Leinster
E Cloonan (0-9); I Tannian (0-3); F Healy (0-2); M Kerins (0-1); R Murray (0-1); D Tierney (0-1)	Report	R Power (0-7); E Brennan (0-6); J Bergin (1-3); A Fogarty (0-4); E Larkin (0-2); Derek Lyng (0-1)

Pearse Stadium, Galway
Referee: S Roche (Tipperary)

GK	1	Liam Donoghue
RCB	2	Damien Joyce
FB	3	Ger Mahon	(substituted off) 47'
LCB	4	Tony Óg Regan
RWB	5	David Collins
CB	6	Diarmuid Cloonan
LWB	7	John Lee
MD	8	Richie Murray	(substituted off) 60'
MD	9	David Tierney
RWF	10	Iarla Tannian
CF	11	Mark Kerins
LWF	12	Alan Kerins	(substituted off) 44'
RCF	13	Kenneth Burke	(substituted off) 25'
FF	14	Eugene Cloonan
LCF	15	Fergal Healy
Substitutes:
		Damien Hayes	(substituted on) 25'
		Niall Healy	(substituted on) 44'
		M. J. Quinn	(substituted on) 47'
		Ger Farragher	(substituted on) 60'

GK	1	Brian Mullins
RCB	2	Richie Mullally	(substituted off) 48'
FB	3	John Tennyson
LCB	4	James Ryall
RWB	5	Tommy Walsh
CB	6	Rory Hanniffy
LWB	7	Diarmuid Lyng	(substituted off) 67'
MD	8	Derek Lyng	(substituted off) 59'
MD	9	Gary Hanniffy
RWF	10	Eoin Larkin	(substituted off) 67'
CF	11	Richie Power
LWF	12	David Franks	(substituted off) 29'
RCF	13	Eddie Brennan (c)
FF	14	Joe Bergin
LCF	15	Aidan Fogarty
Substitutes:
		Michael Jacob	(substituted on) 29'
		Malachy Travers	(substituted on) 48'
		James Young	(substituted on) 59'
		Darren McCormack	(substituted on) 67'
		John McCaffrey	(substituted on) 67'

== Top scorers ==
=== Championship ===
Rank	Player	County	Tally	Total	Matches	Average
1	Eugene Cloonan	Connacht	2–15	21	2	10.50

=== Single game ===
Rank	Player	County	Tally	Total	Opposition
1	Eugene Cloonan	Connacht	2-6	10	Munster
1	Johnny McIntosh	Ulster	0-10	10	Leinster
1	Eoin Kelly	Munster	1-6	9	Connacht
1	Eugene Cloonan	Connacht	0-9	10	Leinster
