= 1984–85 National Hurling League =

54th season of the National Hurling League

League details
- Dates: 7 October 1984 – 30 June 1985

League champions
- Winners: Limerick (9 win)

Other division winners
- Division 2: Clare
- Division 3: Meath
- Division 4: Louth

The 1984–85 National Hurling League was the 54th season of the National Hurling League (NHL), an annual hurling competition for the GAA county teams. It was won by Limerick for the second year in a row.

== Division 1 ==
Limerick came into the season as defending champions of the 1983-84 season. Offaly and Tipperary entered Division 1 as the promoted teams.

On 14 April 1985, Limerick won the title following a 3-12 to 1-7 win over Clare in the final. It was their second league title in succession and their 9th National League title overall.

Tipperary and Wexford were relegated from Division 1.

Laois's Eugene Fennelly was the Division 1 top scorer with 2-44.

=== Table ===
Pos	Team	Pld	W	D	L	Pts	Notes
1	Galway	7	5	1	1	11	
2	Limerick	7	4	0	3	8	National Hurling League champions
3	Offaly	7	4	0	3	8	
4	Kilkenny	7	3	1	3	7	
5	Cork	7	3	0	4	6	
6	Laois	7	3	0	4	6	
7	Wexford	7	3	0	4	6	Relegated to Division 2
8	Tipperary	7	2	0	5	4	Relegated to Division 2

=== Group stage ===
7 October 1984	Cork	3-20 - 4-11	Laois	Páirc Uí Chaoimh, Cork
	T Finn 1-5, T O'Sullivan 0-7, B Óg Murphy 1-2, K Hennessy 1-0, P Hartnett 0-3, T Cashman 0-2, J Hartnett 0-1.		P Cleary 2-1, M Walsh 0-5, PJ Cuddy 1-1, L Bergin 1-0, E Fennelly 0-2, M Cuddy 0-1.	Referee: P Long (Kilkenny)

7 October 1984	Offaly	2-17 - 0-13	Wexford	St. Brendan's Park, Birr
	P Horan 1-7, B Keeshan 1-2, J Dooley 0-3, T Conneely 0-2, D Owens 0-1, P Delaney 0-1, J Kelly 0-1.		B Byrne 0-3, J Holohan 0-3, G O'Connor 0-2, M Fitzhenry 0-2, E Cleary 0-1, P Courtney 0-1, J McDonald 0-1.	Referee: C Foley (Dublin)

7 October 1984	Kilkenny	1-18 - 5-8	Limerick	Nowlan Park, Kilkenny
	K Brennan 0-5, F Cummins 1-1, G Henderson 0-3, P Walsh 0-3, H Ryan 0-2, N Brennan 0-1, L McCarthy 0-1, J Lawlor 0-1, J Brennan 0-1.		P McCarthy 3-0, P Kelly 1-3, T Quaid 1-3, A Garvey 0-1, D Fitzgerald 0-1.	Referee: J Moore (Waterford)

7 October 1984	Galway	2-12 - 3-7	Tipperary	Ballinasloe Sportsfield, Ballinasloe
	M O'Shea 0-10, J Connolly 1-0, N Lane 1-0, M Haverty 0-1, M McGrath 0-1.		N O'Dwyer 1-1, P Dooley 1-1, L Maher 1-0, P McGrath 0-3, N English 0-2.	Referee: N Duggan (Limerick)

28 October 1984	Cork	4-18 - 3-8	Tipperary	Páirc Uí Chaoimh, Cork
	B Óg Murphy 2-1, D Walsh 0-7, D Buckley 1-2, K Hennessy 0-4, T Finn 1-0, J Hartnett 0-2, P Hartnett 0-2.		S Power 2-0, P McGrath 0-5, N O'Dwyer 1-0, P Dooley 0-1, P Kennedy 0-1, L Maher 0-1.

28 October 1984	Galway	1-16 - 3-8	Laois	Ballinasloe Sportsfield, Ballinasloe
	A Cunningham 1-4, T Kilkenny 0-2, M O'Shea 0-2, J Cooney 0-2, M McGrath 0-2, M Connolly 0-1, N Lane 0-1, B Lynskey 0-1, S Linnane 0-1.		E Fennelly 0-7, P Cleary 2-0, M O'Sullivan 1-0, J Dollard 0-1.

28 October 1984	Kilkenny	2-14 - 0-13	Wexford	John Locke Park, Callan
	K Brennan 0-6, R Power 1-1, R Heffernan 1-0, H Ryan 0-3, J Brennan 0-2, L McCarthy 0-1, N Brennan 0-1.		J Holohan 0-6, G O'Connor 0-3, M Fitzhenry 0-2, J McDonnell 0-1, B Byrne 0-1.

28 October 1984	Offaly	0-18 - 5-6	Limerick	St. Brendan's Park, Birr
	J Dooley 0-5, P Corrigan 0-4, T Conneely 0-3, P Carroll 0-2, P Delaney 0-1, B Keeshan 0-1, D Owens 0-1, D Fogarty 0-1.		P Kelly 2-4, P McCarthy 2-0, R Sampson 1-0, J Carroll 0-2.

4 November 1984	Wexford	2-17 - 2-6	Cork	Wexford Park, Wexford
	J Holohan 1-8, J McDonald 0-4, J O'Connor 0-2, F Fenlon 0-1, T Harrington 0-1, M Fitzhenry 0-1.		T Finn 1-0, T Mulcahy 1-0, D Walsh 0-3, P Hartnett 0-1, J Hartnett 0-1, B Murphy 0-1.	Referee: P Long (Kilkenny)

4 November 1984	Tipperary	3-7 - 1-12	Offaly	Semple Stadium, Thurles
	S Power 1-5, G Ryan 1-1, L Maher 1-0, P Kennedy 0-1.		P Corrigan 0-6, P Horan 1-0, P Delaney 0-2, G Coughlan 0-2, P Carroll 0-1, D Owens 0-1.	Referee: S O'Grady (Limerick)

4 November 1984	Limerick	0-9 - 1-18	Galway	Gaelic Grounds, Limerick
	O O'Connor 0-3, P McCarthy 0-2, D Fitzgerald 0-2, J Carroll 0-1, T Quaid 0-1.		M Haverty 0-9, J Cooney 1-1, M Lane 0-3, A Kilkenny 0-2, B Lynskey 0-2, A Cunningham 0-1.	Referee: W Horgan (Cork)

4 November 1984	Laois	1-8 - 1-15	Kilkenny	Kelly Daly Park, Rathdowney
	PJ Cuddy 1-0, P O'Brien 0-3, E Fennelly 0-3, M Walsh 0-1, M Cuddy 0-1.		L McCarthy 1-0, K Brennan 0-4, C Heffernan 0-3, G Henderson 0-2, J Brennan 0-2, G Fennelly 0-2, Ray Heffernan 0-1, R Power 0-1.	Referee: N O'Donoghue (Dublin)

18 November 1984	Offaly	3-21 - 0-11	Cork	St. Brendan's Park, Birr
	P Corrigan 0-11, P Carroll 1-2, J Kelly 1-2, P Horan 1-0, B Keeshan 0-3, P Delaney 0-1, J Mooney 0-1, D Fogarty 0-1.		J Fenton 0-9, T Finn 0-1, T Mulcahy 0-1.	Referee: N O'Donoghue (Dublin)

18 November 1984	Galway	0-8 - 1-5	Kilkenny	Pearse Stadium, Salthill
	J Cooney 0-4, M McGrath 0-2, M Haverty 0-1, N Lane 0-1.		R Power 1-0, K Brennan 0-3, R Heffernan 0-2.	Referee: N Duggan (Limerick)

18 November 1984	Limerick	0-12 - 1-7	Tipperary	Gaelic Grounds, Limerick
	T Quaid 0-3, D Fitzgerald 0-3, P McCarthy 0-2, R Sampson 0-2, M Carroll 0-1, J Carroll 0-1.		S Power 1-3, D O'Connell 0-2, G Ryan 0-1, L Maher 0-1.	Referee: W Horgan (Cork)

18 November 1984	Laois	2-18 - 2-9	Wexford	Kelly Daly Park, Rathdowney
	E Fennelly 0-10, J Keenan 1-3, P O'Brien 1-0, P Critchley 0-2, M Cuddy 0-1, M O'Sullivan 0-1, P Cleary 0-1.		J Holohan 1-5, T Byrne 1-0, J O'Connor 0-1, R Murphy 0-1, J O'Connell 0-1, J McDonald 0-1.	Referee: J Moloney (Tipperary)

9 December 1984	Limerick	1-8 - 0-6	Cork	Gaelic Grounds, Limerick
	D Fitzgerald 1-2, P Kelly 0-2, T Quaid 0-1, M Rea 0-1, O O'Connor 0-1, P McCarthy 0-1.		J Hartnett 0-4, T O'Sullivan 0-2.	Referee: G Ryan (Tipperary)

9 December 1984	Wexford	3-9 - 2-15	Galway	Enniscorthy
	M Fitzhenry 1-2, J Holohan 0-5, T Byrne 1-0, J McDonald 1-0, G O'Connor 0-1, T Dempsey 0-1.		M Haverty 0-7, N Lane 0-5, M McGrath 1-0, J Cooney 1-0, B Lynskey 0-2, T Kilkenny 0-1.	Referee: JJ Landers (Waterford)

9 December 1984	Tipperary	1-14 - 0-7	Kilkenny	Semple Stadium, Thurles
	S Power 0-8, L Maher 1-0, G O'Neill 0-3, P Kennedy 0-2, K Fox 0-1.		R Heffernan 0-6, C Heffernan 0-1.	Referee: N Duggan (Limerick)

9 December 1984	Laois	1-10 - 1-11	Offaly	Kelly Daly Park, Rathdowney
	E Fennelly 0-6, P CLeary 1-1, PJ Cuddy 0-2, P Critchley 0-1.		D Fogarty 1-1, P Corrigan 0-4, B Keeshan 0-2, P Carroll 0-2, J Kelly 0-1.	Referee: P Long (Kilkenny)

3 February 1985	Cork	1-7 - 1-10	Galway	Clonmult Memorial Park, Midleton
	K Hennessy 1-3, T O'Sullivan 0-3, D Walsh 0-1.		M Haverty 0-8, J Cooney 1-0, M McGrath 0-1, N Lane 0-1.

3 February 1985	Tipperary	1-12 - 4-5	Laois	Semple Stadium, Thurles
	S Power 1-4, G O'Neill 0-3, P Kennedy 0-2, P Dooley 0-1, N English 0-1, T O'Connell 0-1.		T Cleary 3-0, E Fennelly 1-3, M Walsh 0-2.	Referee: B Duggan (Limerick)

3 February 1985	Kilkenny	2-15 - 1-11	Offaly	John Locke Park, Callan
	B Fitzpatrick 1-5, L Fennelly 1-2, R Power 0-3, C Heffernan 0-3, J Brennan 0-2.		D Owens 1-0, P Corrigan 0-4, P Cleary 0-2, J Dooley 0-2, B Keeshan 0-1, D Fogarty 0-1, M Coughlan 0-1.	Referee: N O'Donoghue (Dublin)

3 February 1985	Wexford	3-13 - 1-10	Limerick	O'Kennedy Park, New Ross
	T Dempsey 1-5, B Byrne 1-3, J McDonald 1-1, J Holohan 0-2, G O'Connor 0-1, R Murphy 0-1.		L O'Donoghue 1-0, D Fitzgerald 0-3, P Kelly 0-3, O O'Connor 0-2, P McCarthy 0-1, R Samspon 0-1.	Referee: J Moore (Waterford)

10 February 1985	Laois	1-12 - 0-12	Limerick	Kelly Daly Park, Rathdowney
	E Fennelly 0-7, P Cleary 1-1, P O'Brien 0-1, J Taylor 0-1, PJ Cuddy 0-1, P Critchley 0-1.		J Carroll 0-2, P Kelly 0-2, B Carroll 0-2, O O'Connor 0-2, L O'Donoghue 0-2, D Fitzgerald 0-1, P McCarthy 0-1.	Referee: J Denton (Wexford)

10 February 1985	Kilkenny	4-5 - 2-14	Cork	John Locke Park, Callan
	L Fennelly 2-0, C Heffernan 1-2, K Brennan 1-1, B Fitzpatrick 0-2.		K Hennessy 1-4, T O'Sullivan 1-3, P Horgan 0-2, T Cashman 0-1, J Hartnett 0-1, J Fenton 0-1, D Walsh 0-1, J Barry-Murphy 0-1.	Referee: G Ryan (Tipperary)

10 February 1985	Tipperary	0-6 - 4-7	Wexford	Davin Park, Carrick-on-Suir
	S Power 0-3, P Dooley 0-2, D O'Connell 0-1.		R Murphy 2-1, J Holohan 1-2, M Fitzhenry 1-0, T Dempsey 0-2, E Cleary 0-1, J McDonald 0-1.	Referee: P Long (Kilkenny)

10 February 1985	Offaly	1-14 - 0-10	Galway	St. Brendan's Park, Birr
	P Corrigan 0-9, D Fogarty 1-0, P Cleary 0-2, J Lyons 0-1, B Keeshan 0-1, M Cashin 0-1.		M Haverty 0-8, O Kilkenny 0-1, M McGrath 0-1.	Referee: N Duggan (Limerick)

=== Play-offs ===
24 February 1985	Cork	3-15 - 2-4	Laois	Semple Stadium, Thurles
	K Hennessy 1-3, D Walsh 1-2, T Mulcahy 1-1, P Crowley 0-4, T O'Sullivan 0-2, J Hartnett 0-2, P Horgan 0-1.		P Cleary 1-0, PJ Cuddy 1-0, E Fennelly 0-2, P Critchley 0-1, C Jones 0-1.	Referee: J O'Grady (Limerick)

3 March 1985	Laois	1-8 - 1-4	Wexford	Geraldine Park, Athy
	E Fennelly 1-4, PJ Cuddy 0-2, M Aherne 0-1, M O'Sullivan 0-1.		T Dempsey 1-1, M Fitzhenry 0-1, E Cleary 0-1, J Holohan 0-1.	Referee: J Moore (Waterford)

=== Knock-out stage ===
Quarter-finals

10 March 1985 Quarter-final	Clare	0-13 - 1-10	Kilkenny	Semple Stadium, Thurles
	C Lyons 0-5, J Shanahan 0-3, M Guilfoyle 0-3, S Dolan 0-1, PJ Deasy 0-1.		K Brennan 0-6, C Heffernan 1-0, R Power 0-2, H Ryan 0-2.	Referee: G Ryan (Tipperary)

10 March 1985 Quarter-final	Limerick	4-12 - 2-9	Dublin	Semple Stadium, Thurles
	P Kelly 1-7, D Fitzgerald 1-3, S Fitzgibbon 1-0, P McCarthy 1-0, O O'Connor 0-2.		P Carton 1-7, E O'Shea 1-1, M Hurley 0-1.	Referee: G Rayn (Tipperary)

24 March 1985 Quarter-final replay	Clare	1-12 - 1-7	Kilkenny	Semple Stadium, Thurles
	C Lyons 0-7, S Dolan 1-0, M Guilfoyle 0-2, P Deasy 0-1, J Callinan 0-1, J Shanahan 0-1.		K Brennan 0-4, G Henderson 1-0, H Ryan 0-1, B Fitzpatrick 0-1, R Heffernan 0-1.	Attendance: 7,766; Referee: JJ Landers (Waterford)

Semi-finals

31 March 1985 Semi-final	Limerick	0-15 – 1-9	Offaly	Semple Stadium, Thurles
	P Kelly 0-6, O O'Connor 0-3, D Fitzgerald 0-3, R Sampson 0-2, J Carroll 0-1.		P Corrigan 1-4, J Dooley 0-2, P Cleary 0-1, J Kelly 0-1, P Carroll 0-1.	Referee: G Ryan (Tipperary)

31 March 1985 Semi-final	Clare	1-14 – 0-11	Galway	Semple Stadium, Thurles
	C Lyons 0-6, J Shanahan 1-1, M Guilfoyle 0-2, A Cunningham 0-2, J Callinan 0-1, P Morey 0-1, S Stack 0-1.		S Mahon 0-2, M Haverty 0-2, J Cooney 0-2, M McGrath 0-2, N Lane 0-2, T Kilkenny 0-1.	Referee: N Duggan (Limerick)

Final

14 April 1985 Final	Limerick	3-12 – 1-7	Clare	Semple Stadium, Thurles
	P McCarthy 2-1, S Fitzgibbon 1-3, P Kelly 0-5, J Carroll 0-1, D Fitzgerald 0-1, O O'Connor 0-1.		C Lyons 1-4, P Morey 0-1, A Nugent 0-1, S Dolan 0-1.	Attendance: 20,700; Referee: J Moore (Waterford)

=== Scoring statistics ===
Rank	Player	Team	Tally	Total	Matches	Average
1	Eugene Fennelly	Laois	2-44	50	9	5.55
2	Paddy Corrigan	Offaly	1-42	45	7	6.42
3	Paddy Kelly	Limerick	4-32	44	9	4.88
4	John Holohan	Wexford	3-32	41	8	5.12
5	Séamus Power	Tipperary	5-23	38	6	6.33
6	Michael Haverty	Galway	0-36	36	7	5.14
7	Pat Cleary	Laois	10-04	34	9	3.77
8	Pat McCarthy	Limerick	8-07	32	9	3.55
8	Kieran Brennan	Kilkenny	1-29	32	9	3.55
10	Kevin Hennessy	Cork	4-14	26	5	5.20

Top scorers in a single game

Rank	Player	Team	Tally	Total	Opposition
1	John Holohan	Wexford	1-08	11	Cork
1	Paddy Corrigan	Offaly	0-11	11	Cork
3	Paddy Kelly	Limerick	2-04	10	Offaly
3	Pádraig Horan	Offaly	1-07	10	Wexford
3	Paddy Kelly	Limerick	1-07	10	Dublin
3	Peadar Carton	Dublin	1-07	10	Limerick
3	Martin O'Shea	Galway	0-10	10	Tipperary
3	Eugene Fennelly	Laois	0-10	10	Wexford
9	Pat McCarthy	Limerick	3-00	10	Kilkenny
9	Pat Cleary	Laois	3-00	10	Tipperary
9	Michael Haverty	Galway	0-09	9	Limerick
9	John Fenton	Cork	0-09	9	Offaly
9	Paddy Corrigan	Offaly	0-09	9	Galway

== Division 2 ==
=== Table ===
Pos	Team	Pld	W	D	L	Pts	Notes
1	Clare	7	7	0	0	14	Promoted to Division 1
2	Dublin	7	4	1	2	9	Promoted to Division 1
3	Westmeath	7	4	0	3	8	
4	Roscommon	7	4	0	3	8	
5	Kerry	7	2	2	3	6	
6	Antrim	7	3	0	4	6	
7	Waterford	7	2	0	5	4	Relegated to Division 3
8	Kildare	7	0	1	6	1	Relegated to Division 3

== Division 3 ==
=== Table ===
Pos	Team	Pld	W	D	L	Pts	Notes
1	Meath	7	7	0	0	14	Promoted to Division 2
2	Down	7	6	0	1	12	Promoted to Division 2
3	Carlow	7	4	0	3	8	
4	Wicklow	7	4	0	3	8	
5	Armagh	7	4	0	3	8	
6	Derry	7	2	0	5	4	
7	Mayo	7	0	1	6	1	
8	Longford	7	0	1	6	1	Relegated to Division 4

== Division 4 ==
=== Knock-out stage ===
Final

30 June 1985 Final	Louth	3-12 - 3-5	Sligo	Pearse Park, Longford
