= 1985 Railway Cup Hurling Championship =

Gaelic football and hurling competition

- Dates: 27 January 1985 - 18 March 1985
- Teams: 4
- Champions: Munster (37th title); Ger Cunningham (captain)
- Runners-up: Connacht; Noel Lane (captain)

Tournament statistics
- Matches played: 3
- Goals scored: 12 (4 per match)
- Points scored: 57 (19 per match)
- Top scorer(s): Michael Haverty (1-10)

The 1985 Railway Cup Hurling Championship was the 59th staging of the Railway Cup since its establishment by the Gaelic Athletic Association in 1927. The cup began on 27 January 1985 and ended on 18 March 1985.

Munster were the defending champions.

On 18 March 1985, Munster won the cup after a 3-06 to 1-11 defeat of Connacht in the final at Semple Stadium. This was their 37th Railway Cup title overall and their second title in succession.

== Results ==
=== Semi-finals ===
27 January 1985 Semi-final	Leinster	2-06 - 1-12	Connacht	St. Brendan's Park, Birr
	P Corrigan 1-4, PJ Cuddy 1-0, C Heffernan 0-1, P Carroll 0-1.		M Haverty 1-5, J Cooney 0-3, N Lane 0-1, B Lynskey 0-1, M Connolly 0-1, T Kilkenny 0-1.	Referee: G Ryan (Tipperary)

27 January 1985 Semi-final	Ulster	2-06 - 3-16	Munster	St. Patrick's Park, Newcastle
	C Donnelly 2-2, C Mageean 0-1, B Donnelly 0-1, B Coulter 0-1, E Donnelly 0-1.		P Kelly 0-6, S Power 1-1, T O'Sullivan 0-4, G McInerney 1-0, N English 1-0, P Hartnett 0-2, J Fenton 0-2, S Stack 0-1.

=== Final ===
18 March 1985 Final	Munster	3-06 - 1-11	Connacht	Semple Stadium, Thurles
	N English 2-0, T Mulcahy 1-0, J Fenton 0-3, J Carroll 0-1, S Power 0-1, K Hennessy 0-1.		N Lane 1-2, M Haverty 0-5, S Mahon 0-3, A Cunningham 0-1.	Referee: N O'Donoghue (Dublin)

== Scoring statistics ==
Top scorers overall

Rank	Player	Club	Tally	Total	Matches	Average
1	Michael Haverty	Connacht	1-10	13	2	6.50
2	Nicky English	Munster	3-00	9	2	4.50
3	Colin Donnelly	Ulster	2-02	8	1	8.00

== Bibliography ==
- Donegan, Des, The Complete Handbook of Gaelic Games (DBA Publications Limited, 2005).
