= Brian Costello =

Brian Costello may refer to:

- Brian Costello (hurler) (born 1984), Irish hurler
- Brian Costello (wrestler) (born 1963), American professional wrestler
- Brian J. Costello (born 1966), American historian, author, archivist and humanitarian
- Brian Costello (politician), American politician
