= John Carroll (hurler) =

Irish sportsman

Personal information
- Native name: Seán Ó Cearrbhall (Irish)
- Born: 16 January 1978 (age 48) Roscrea, Ireland
- Occupation: Publican
- Height: 1.85 m (6 ft 1 in)

Sport
- Sport: Hurling
- Position: Centre forward
Club
- Years: Club
- Roscrea
Inter-county
Years	County	Apps (scores)
1997-2007	Tipperary	29 (7-18)
Inter-county titles
- Munster titles: 1
- All-Irelands: 1
- NHL: 1
- All Stars: 1

John Carroll (born 16 January 1978) is an Irish sportsman. He played hurling with his local club Roscrea and with the Tipperary senior inter-county team. He won an All-Ireland Senior hurling medal (2001) and an All-Star award (2000). He usually played in the half-forward line or full-forward line later in his career, but operated as a defender in his earlier career.

== Early life ==
John Carroll was born in Roscrea, County Tipperary in 1978. He was educated locally and later became a star at club and inter-county hurling.

== Playing career ==
Carroll played his club hurling with his native Roscrea with whom he won a North Tipperary Senior Hurling medal in 2004.

Carroll first tasted inter-county success when he captained the Tipperary Under-16 team to the 'Nenagh Co-Op All-Ireland' title in 1994. Since then he has played for Tipperary at minor and Under-21 level, winning an All-Ireland minor medal in 1996 and a Munster Under-21 medal in 1999. Carroll made his competitive debut for the Tipperary senior hurlers in the 1997 National League semi-final against Galway.

Carroll made his Championship debut against Waterford in the Munster Championship in 2000. He won his first All-Star that year. 2001 proved to be a good year for Carroll as a hurler. He was a key member of the panel when Tipp won the National League, the Munster Championship and the All-Ireland Championship. Carroll also won a Railway Cup medal with Munster in 2001.

Carroll was one of the most versatile players on the Tipperary team. Although his best position was centre-back, he played as a full back when he made his debut in 1997. Similarly, he has won an All-Star award at wing-back while playing in the centre-forward position the following year. Carroll has also played Gaelic football with the Tipperary senior team. Coached Colt GAA club, Co. Laois successfully in 2008/09 and 2009/10 keeping them in the club Senior hurling ranks.

== Honours ==
Tipperary

- Munster Minor Hurling Championship (1): 1996
- All-Ireland Minor Hurling Championship (1): 1996
- Munster Under-21 Hurling Championship (1): 1999
- Munster Senior Hurling Championship (1): 2001
- National Hurling League (1): 2001
- All-Ireland Senior Hurling Championship (1): 2001

Munster

- Railway Cup (1): 2001

Individual

- GAA GPA All Stars Awards (1): 2000

== See also ==
- Tipperary Player Profiles
