= Tipperary county hurling team results (2000–2009) =

This article contains the results of the Tipperary county hurling team in the Championship during the 2000s.

Tipperary played 48 Championship games during the decade, winning 28, losing 16 and drawing 4. They won 3 Munster titles in 2001, 2008, and 2009 and won 1 All Ireland title in 2001.

== 2000 ==
2000-05-28
Quarter-Final

Tipperary	0-17 – 0-14	Waterford
T Dunne 0-5 (5f), J Leahy 0-3, D Ryan, P Shelley, M O'Leary 0-2 each, B O'Meara, P Ryan, P O'Brien 0-1 each.	(report)	K McGrath, P Flynn (2f) 0-3 each, P Queally, D Bennett 0-2 each, F Hartley (f), B O'Sullivan, T Browne, D Shanahan 0-1 each.

Páirc Uí Chaoimh, Cork
Referee: D. Murphy (Wexford)

2000-06-11
Semi-Final

Tipperary	2-19 – 1-14	Clare
E. O'Neill (0-7), D. Ryan (1-1), P. Shelly (1-0), J. Leahy (0-3), B. O'Meara (0-3), M. O'Leary (0-3), T. Dunne (0-1), P. O'Brien (0-1).	(Report)	D. Forde (1-1), J. O'Connor (0-3), N. Gilligan (0-2), S. McMahon (0-2), G. Quinn (0-1), B. Quinn (0-1), A. Daly (0-1), E. Flannery (0-1), K. Ralph (0-1), B. Murphy (0-1).

Páirc Uí Chaoimh, Cork
Referee: P. O'Connor (Limerick)

2000-07-02
Final

Cork	0-23 – 3-12	Tipperary
J Deane 0-10 (7f), B O'Connor, S McGrath, A Browne 0-3 each, P Ryan 0-2 (1f), D Barrett, K Murray 0-1 each.	(report)	E O'Neill 1-5 (4f), T Dunne 2-0, B O'Meara, E Enright 0-2 each, J Leahy, P Kelly, L Cahill 0-1 each.

Semple Stadium, Thurles
Referee: P. Horan (Offaly)

23 July
All Ireland Quarter-Final

Galway	1-14 – 0-15	Tipperary
E Cloonan 1-4 (1-1 frees), R Gantley 0-5 (2f, 2'65's), D Canning, A Kerins, O Fahy, J Rabbitte, K Broderick 0-1 each.	(report); Full Match	J Leahy 0-4 (3f), E O'Neill 0-3 (2f), B O'Meara, M O'Leary 0-2 each, P Shelley, E Enright, P Kelly, E Kelly 0-1 each.

Croke Park, Dublin
Referee: D. Murphy (Wexford)

== 2001 ==
3 June
Semi-Final

Tipperary	0-15 – 0-14	Clare
E. Kelly (0-7), E. Enright (0-2), T. Dunne (0-2), B. O'Meara (0-1), L. Corbett (0-1), D. Ryan (0-1), P. Kelly (0-1).	(Report)	J. O'Connor (0-7), D. Forde (0-4), S. McMahon (0-3).

Páirc Uí Chaoimh, Cork
Attendance: 42,063
Referee: D. Murphy (Wexford)

1 July
Munster Final

Tipperary	2-16 – 1-17	Limerick
D. Ryan (1-1), L. Corbett (1-1), M. O'Leary (0-3), B. O'Meara (0-2), E. Enright (0-2), T. Dunne (0-2), E. Kelly (0-2), P. Kelly (0-1), E. O'Neill (0-1), J. O'Brien (0-1).	(Report)	S. O'Connor (1-3), P. O'Grady (0-5), M. Foley (0-2), C. Carey (0-1), M. O'Brien (0-1), J. Foley (0-1), O. Moran (0-1), J. Butler (0-1), B. Begley (0-1), B. Foley (0-1).

Páirc Uí Chaoimh, Cork
Attendance: 43,500
Referee: P. Horan (Offaly)

12 August
All Ireland Semi-Final

Wexford	1-16 – 3-10	Tipperary
E. Kelly (0-5), J. Carroll (1-1), M. O'Leary (0-4), T. Dunne (0-2), E. Enright (0-1), B. O'Meara (0-1), M. Ryan (0-1), L. Corbett (0-1).	(report)	L. O'Gorman (2-0), M. Jordan (0-4), P. Codd (0-4), R. McCarthy (1-0), A. Fenlon (0-2).

Croke Park, Dublin
Attendance: 50,274
Referee: P. O'Connor (Limerick)

18 August
All Ireland Semi-Final
Replay

Tipperary	3-12 – 0-10	Wexford
E. Kelly (0-9), E. O'Neill (2-1), J. Carroll (1-0), M. O'Leary (0-2).	(report)	P. Codd (0-7), L. Murphy (0-1), M. Jordan (0-1), B. Goff (0-1).

Croke Park, Dublin
Attendance: 39,125
Referee: P. Horan (Offaly)

9 September
Final

Tipperary	2-18 - 2-15	Galway
M. O'Leary (2-1), E. Kelly (0-7), T. Dunne (0-5), L. Corbett (0-2), J. Carroll (0-1), D. Ryan (0-1), P. O'Brien (0-1).	Report; Full Match	E. Cloonan (1-5), F. Healy (1-2), K. Broderick (0-5), M. Kerins (0-2), J. Rabbitte (0-1).

Croke Park, Dublin
Attendance: 68,515
Referee: P. O'Connor (Limerick)

== 2002 ==
19 May
Quarter-Final

Tipperary	1-18 - 2-13	Clare
E. Kelly (1-8), C. Gleeson (0-2), N. Morris (0-2), T. Dunne (0-2), B. O'Meara (0-1), J. O'Brien (0-1), E. O'Neill (0-1), B. Dunne (0-1).	Report	D. Forde (2-0), T. Griffin (0-6), J. Reddan (0-3), J. O'Connor (0-2), T. Carmody (0-1), N. Gilligan (0-1).

Páirc Uí Chaoimh, Cork
Referee: M. Healy (Cork))

2 June
Semi-Final

Tipperary	1-20 - 1-13	Limerick
E. Kelly (0-12), J. Carroll (1-2), B. Dunne (0-2), T. Dunne (0-1), N. Morris (0-1), B. O'Meara (0-1), C. Gleeson (0-1).	Report	M. Keane (0-8), O. Moran (1-0), P. Lawlor (0-2), O. O'Neill (0-1), J. Butler (0-1), B. Foley (0-1).

Páirc Uí Chaoimh, Cork
Referee: A. Mac Suibhne (Dublin))

30 June
Final

Waterford	2-23 - 3-12	Tipperary
P. Flynn (1-6), K. McGrath (0-7), J. Mullane (0-4), T. Browne (1-0), E. Kelly (0-3), D. Bennett (0-1), E. McGrath (0-1), S. Prendergast (0-1).	Report	B. Dunne (2-2), E. Kelly (1-4), T. Dunne (0-2), L. Corbett (0-1), C. Gleeson (0-1), J. Carroll (0-1), B. O’Meara (0-1).

Páirc Uí Chaoimh, Cork
Referee: A. Mac Suibhne (Dublin))

13 July
Qualifier Round 2

Tipperary	2-19 - 1-9	Offaly
B. O'Meara (1-2), J. Carroll (1-1), M. O'Leary (0-4), E. Kelly (0-4), P. Kelly (0-3), T. Dunne (0-2), B. Dunne (0-2), E. O'Neill (0-1).	Report	S. Brown (1-1), S. Whelehan (0-4), R. Hanniffy (0-1), Barry Whelehan (0-1), K. Martin (0-1), B. Carroll (0-1).

O'Moore Park, Portlaoise
Attendance: 20,000
Referee: M. Wadding (Waterford)
28 July
All Ireland Quarter-final

Tipperary	1-25 - 2-12	Antrim
E. Kelly (0-7), P. Kelly (0-5 (0-1), E. O'Neill (1-1), T. Dunne (0-3), B. Dunne (0-3), J. Carroll (0-2), B. O'Meara (0-2), L. Corbett (0-1), N. Morris (0-1).	Report	L. Watson (1-6), L. Richmond (1-1), P. Richmond (0-2), G. O'Kane (0-2), B. McFall (0-1).

Croke Park, Dublin
Attendance: 41,619
Referee: P. Ahern (Carlow)

18 August
Semi-final

Kilkenny	1-20 - 1-16	Tipperary
H. Shefflin (0-7), J. Coogan (1-1), D. J. Carey (0-4), D. Lyng (0-2), A. Comerford (0-2), M. Comerford (0-1), J. Hoyne (0-1), E. Brennan (0-1), C. Carter (0-1).	Report	E. Kelly (0-4), J. Carroll (1-0), M. O'Leary (0-3), P. Kelly (0-3), E. O'Neill (0-2), T. Dunne (0-1), B. O'Meara (0-1), L. Corbett (0-1), E. Corcoran (0-1).

Croke Park, Dublin
Attendance: 53,385
Referee: A. Mac Suibhne (Dublin)

== 2003 ==
18 May
Quarter-final

Clare	2-17 - 0-14	Tipperary
N. Gilligan 0-6 (0-3 frees); A. Quinn 1-2; J. O'Connor 1-1; C. Lynch 0-2; A. Markham 0-2; T. Carmody, T. Griffin, D. McMahon, S. McMahon (free), 0-1 each		E. Kelly 0-7 (0-4 frees); B. O'Meara 0-3; T. Dunne, C. Gleeson, L. Cahill, J. Carroll, 0-1 each

Páirc Uí Chaoimh, Cork
Referee: A. Mac Suibhne (Dublin)

14 June
Qualifiers Round 1

Tipperary	3-28 - 0-13	Laois
P Kelly (0-3, 165, 1f), M O’Leary (0-3), C Gleeson (0-3), G O’Grady (0-2)), J Carroll (0-1), E Kelly (2-8), D Byrne (0-6, 2f), B O’Meara (1-1), L Corbett (0-1))		C Coonan (0-1)), J Young (0-5, 1pen, 165, 2f), J Phelan (0-1), E Maher (0-2)), L Tynan (0-1), B McCormack (0-2), D Cuddy (0-1)

O'Moore Park, Portlaoise
Referee: T. McIntyre (Antrim)

13 July
Qualifiers Round 2

Galway	1-17 - 1-18	Tipperary
R. Gantley 0-7 (0-5 frees); D. Hayes 1-1; K. Broderick 0-2; D. Tierney 0-2; A. Kerins 0-2; O. Canning, R. Murray, O. Fahy, 0-1 each		L. Corbett 0-4; B. Dunne 1-1; M. O'Leary 0-3; B. O'Meara 0-2; J. Carroll 0-2; E. Kelly 0-2 (frees); P. Kelly, G. O'Grady, C. Gleeson, E. Enright, 0-1 each

Pearse Stadium, Galway
Referee: D Murphy (Wexford)

27 July
All Ireland Quarter-final

Tipperary	2-16 - 2-11	Offaly
E. Kelly 0-5 (0-3 frees); J. Carroll, B. O'Meara 1-0 each; P. Kelly 0-3 (0-1 free); T. Dunne 0-3 (0-2 '65's); B. Dunne, M. O'Leary, L. Corbett, E. Corcoran, C. Gleeson 0-1 each		G. Hanniffy 1-2; N. Coughlan 1-1; B. Carroll 0-2 frees; R. Hanniffy 0-2 (0-1 free); B. Murphy, C Cassidy, M. Cordial, S. Whelahan 0-1 each

Croke Park, Dublin
Referee: G Harrington (Cork) Match Report

17 August
Semi-final

Kilkenny	3-18 - 0-15	Tipperary
H. Shefflin 1-7 (0-5 frees); E. Brennan 1-4; T. Walsh 1-0; D.J. Carey 0-3 seventies; D. Lyng 0-2; J. Hoyne and J. Coogan 0-1 each		E. Kelly 0-8 (0-6 frees); C. Gleeson 0-2; P. Kelly, J. Carroll, P. O'Meara, E. Enright and P. O'Brien 0-1 each

Croke Park, Dublin
Referee: P. O'Connor (Limerick) Match Report
Highlights

== 2004 ==
2004-06-06
Semi-final

Tipperary	3-12 – 4-10	Waterford
E. Kelly 2-8 (0-4 frees); C. Morrissey 1-1; P. Kelly (seventy), T. Dunne and S. Butler 0-1 each.	(report)	D. Shanahan 2-0; J. Mullane and P. O'Brien 1-0 each; S. Prendergast, D. Bennett (0-1 seventy), P. Flynn (0-1 free) and E. Kelly (0-1 free), 0-2 each; M. Walsh and E. McGrath 0-1 each.

Páirc Uí Chaoimh, Cork
Referee: G. Kirwan (Offaly).

2004-06-26
Qualifiers Round 1

Tipperary	3-10 – 2-12	Limerick
S. Butler 1-3; T. Dunne 1-1 (0-1 free); J. Carroll 1-0; C. Morrissey 0-2; E. Kelly 0-3 (0-2 frees); B. Dunne 0-1.	(report)	A. O'Shaughnessy 2-1; N. Moran 0-7 (0-4 frees, 0-2 65's); M. Foley, J. O'Brien, P. Tobin, D. O'Grady, 0-1 each.

Gaelic Grounds, Limerick
Attendance: 26,600
Referee: A. Mac Suibhne (Dublin)

2004-07-10
Round 2

Cork	2-19 – 1-16	Tipperary
J. Deane 0-7 (0-6 frees); N. McCarthy 1-2; T. McCarthy 1-1; B. O'Connor 0-4 (0-2 frees); K. Murphy 0-2; J. O'Connor, J. Gardiner and M. O'Connell 0-1 each.	(report)	E. Kelly 0-9 (0-6 frees); P. Kelly 1-0; B. Dunne 0-3; C. Gleeson, C. Morrissey, J. Carroll and M. O'Leary 0-1 each.

FitzGerald Stadium, Killarney
Referee: B. Kelly (Westmeath)

== 2005 ==
15 May
Quarter-final

Tipperary	2-14 – 2-14	Limerick
E Kelly 0-7 (5f), P Kelly 0-4 (4f), G O'Grady, J Devane 1-0 each, T Dunne, L Corbett 0-1, C Morrissey 0-1 each.	Report	TJ Ryan 1-7 (1-0 pen, 0-5f), D Sheehan 1-0, N Moran 0-3, P Tobin 0-2, C Fitzgerald, P O'Grady 0-1 each.

Semple Stadium, Thurles
Referee: D Kirwan (Cork)

21 May
Quarter-final replay

Limerick	0-18 – 2-13 (aet)	Tipperary
TJ Ryan 0-8 (all fs); D O'Grady 0-2; P Lawlor 0-1 (f); P O'Grady, C Fitzgerald, N Moran, A O'Shaughnessy, D Sheehan, K Tobin, D Ryan 0-1 each.	Report	E Kelly 0-7 (0-6 fs); G O'Grady, E Sweeney 1-0 each; T Dunne 0-4, P Kelly, L Corbett 0-1 each.

Gaelic Grounds, Limerick
Referee: A Mac Suibhne (Dublin)

5 June
Semi-final

Tipperary	2-14 – 0-14	Clare
E Kelly 0-7 (4f); L Corbett 1-1; M Webster 1-0; E Sweeney, F Devaney 0-2 each; B Dunne, P Kelly 0-1 each.	Report	N Gilligan 0-5 (3f); D McMahon, S McMahon (2f), B Nugent, T Griffin 0-2 each; T Carmody 0-1.

Gaelic Grounds, Limerick
Referee: P O'Connor (Limerick)

26 June
Final

Cork	1-21 – 1-16	Tipperary
B O'Connor 0-6 (6f), J Deane 0-5 (3f), Kieran Murphy (Sarsfields) 1-2, N Ronan 0-3, J O'Connor 0-2, B Corcoran, N McCarthy, Kieran Murphy (Erin's Own) 0-1 each.	Report	P Kelly 0-7 (2f 1'65'), E Kelly 0-6 (2f), T Dunne 1-0, J Devane 0-2, J Carroll 0-1.

Páirc Uí Chaoimh, Cork
Referee: B Kelly (Westmeath)

31 July
All Ireland Quarter-final

Galway	2-20 - 2-18	Tipperary
G Farragher 0-9, D Hayes 1-0, D Forde 1-0, R Murray 0-3, F Healy 0-2, D Tierney 0-2, A Kerins 0-2, N Healy 0-1, S Kavanagh 0-1.	Report	E Kelly 1-9, T Dunne 1-1, P Kelly 0-4, G O'Grady 0-1, M Webster 0-1, B Dunne 0-1, D Fitzgerald 0-1.

Croke Park, Dublin
Referee: A Mac Suibhne (Dublin)

== 2006 ==
14 May 2006 Quarter-final	Tipperary	0-22 - 2-12	Limerick	Semple Stadium
14:00	E. Kelly 0-14 (0-4 frees, 0-1 65); J. O’Brien 0-2; K. Dunne 0-2; M. Webster, G. O’Grady, J. Carroll, D. Egan, 0-1 each.	Report	M. Keane 0-5 (all frees); B. Begley 1-1; A. O’Shaughnessy 1-1; S. Lucey 0-2; B. Foley 0-2 (frees); C. Fitzgerald 0-1.	Attendance: 26,494; Referee: M Haverty (Galway)

4 June 2006 Semi-final	Tipperary	3-14 - 1-12	Waterford	Páirc Uí Chaoimh
14:00	E. Kelly 2-9 (0-4 frees, 0-2 ‘65’s); L. Corbett 1-0; J. O’Brien 0-2; J. Carroll, G. O’Grady and M. Webster 0-1 each.	Report	P. Flynn 0-5 (0-4 frees); D. Shanahan 1-0; K. McGrath 0-3; E. McGrath, J. Kennedy, D. Bennett (free) and J. Mullane 0-1 each.	Attendance: 27,680; Referee: J Sexton (Cork)

25 June 2006 Final	Cork	2-14 - 1-14	Tipperary	Semple Stadium
16:00	J. Deane 0-8 (0-5 frees); B. O’Connor and B. Corcoran 1-1 each; J. Gardiner 0-2 (0-1 free); J. O’Connor and K. Murphy 0-1 each.	Report	E. Kelly 0-7 (0-4 frees), 0-2 (‘65’s); L. Corbett 1-1; J. O’Brien and J. Carroll 0-2 each; P. Kelly and B. Dunne 0-1 each.	Attendance: 53,286; Referee: D Murphy (Wexford)

23 July 2006 Quarter-final	Waterford	1-22 - 3-13	Tipperary	Croke Park
16:00	D. Shanahan 1-5; D. Bennett 0-6 frees; E. McGrath, P. Flynn (0-2 frees) and J. Mullane 0-3 each; K. McGrath (free) and M. Walsh 0-1 each.	Report	E. Kelly 1-8 (1-3 frees, 0-2 65’s); J. Carroll 2-0; L. Corbett 0-2; P. Kelly, J. O’Brien and W. Ryan 0-1 each.	Attendance: 45,928; Referee: B Kelly (Westmeath)

== 2007 ==
10 June Semi-final	Limerick	1-19 - 1-19	Tipperary	Gaelic Grounds
	A O’Shaughnessy 0-6 (0-4 frees); O Moran 0-5; P Tobin 1-1; B Foley 0-3; N Moran 0-2; M O’Brien 0-2; M Fitzgerald 0-1.	Report	W Ryan 0-7 (0-6 frees); J Carroll 1-1; D Egan 0-3; J Woodlock 0-2; E Kelly 0-2; L Corbett 0-2; R O’Dwyer, S McGrath, 0-1 each.	Attendance: 36,246; Referee: D Kirwan (Cork)

16 June Semi-final replay	Tipperary	2-21 - 1-24 (AET)	Limerick	Semple Stadium
	E. Kelly 0-9 (0-6 frees); S. Butler 1-3; D. Egan 1-2; L. Corbett 0-3; B. Dunne 0-2; J. Woodlock, E. Corcoran (S/L), 0-1 each.	Report	M. Fitzgerald 1-3; A. O’Shaughnessy 0-6 (0-5 frees 0-1 65); O. Moran 0-5; N. Moran 0-3; K. Tobin 0-2; J. O’Brien 0-2; B. Geary 0-2 (frees); M. Foley 0-1.	Attendance: 27,117; Referee: B Gavin (Offaly)

24 June Semi-final 2nd replay	Limerick	0-22 - 2-13 (AET)	Tipperary	Gaelic Grounds
	A. O’Shaughnessy 0-6 (0-3 frees 0-1 65); N. Moran 0-5; B. Geary 0-3 (0-1 free 0-1 65); O. Moran 0-3; M. Fitzgerald 0-2; K. Tobin 0-2; D. O’Grady 0-1.	Report	E. Kelly 0-9 (0-7 frees); D. Egan 1-0; W. Ryan 1-0; S. Butler 0-2; S. McGrath, P. Bourke, 0-1 each.	Attendance: 30,608; Referee: S McMahon (Clare)

30 June Round 1	Tipperary	2-17 - 2-13	Offaly	Semple Stadium
	E Kelly (1-12, 1-10f), L Corbett (1-1), F Devanney (0-2), S Butler (0-2).		D Murray (1-5, 1-4f, 0-1 ‘65'), S Ryan (1-2), G Hanniffy (0-2), P Cleary (0-1f), B Carroll (0-1); J Bergin (0-1), R Hanniffy (0-1).	Attendance: 7,533; Referee: M Haverty (Galway)

7 July Round 2	Dublin	1-11 - 1-20	Tipperary	Parnell Park
	P Carton 1-1, K Dunne 0-3, A McCrabbe 0-2 (0-1f), R O'Carroll, D Qualter, J Kelly, D Curtin (0-1f), S Mullen 0-1 each.		W Ryan 0-10 (0-6), L Corbett 1-1, E Kelly 0-3 (0-1f), S Butler 0-2, B Dunne, F Devanney, D Egan, S McGrath 0-1.	Referee: D Connolly (Kilkenny)

14 July Round 3	Tipperary	2-16 - 1-18	Cork	Semple Stadium
	W Ryan 2-3, L Corbett, B Dunne 0-3 each, S Butler, H Moloney 0-2 each, D Hickey, J Carroll, D Egan 0-1 each.	Report	N Ronan 1-2, J Deane 0-5, J O'Connor 0-3, K Hartnett, K Murphy (Erin's Own), P Cronin 0-2 each, B O'Connor, K Murphy (Sarsfield's) 0-1 each.	Attendance: 12,902; Referee: B Kelly (Westmeath)

28 July All Ireland Quarter-final	Wexford	3-10 - 1-14	Tipperary	Croke Park
	B Lambert (1-2, 1f), R Kehoe (1-0), D Fitzhenry (1-0, 1f), R Jacob, D O'Connor (0-2 each), S Nolan (0-2, 1 '65'), R McCarthy, E Quigley (0-1 each).	Report	L Corbett (1-1), D Hickey (0-4), E Kelly (0-3, 2f), B Dunne, H Maloney (0-2 each), J Carroll, S McGrath (0-1 each).	Referee: J McGrath (Westmeath)

== 2008 ==
8 June
Semi-final

Cork	1-13 - 1-19	Tipperary
B O'Connor 1-3 (2f), C Naughton 0-4, J O'Connor 0-2, S Óg Ó hAilpín, P O'Sullivan, T Kenny, B Corry 0-1 each.		E Kelly 1-7 (5f), L Corbett 0-4, S Callinan 0-3, E Corcoran (sl), W Ryan, S McGrath, P Kerwick, M Webster 0-1 each.

Páirc Uí Chaoimh, Cork
Referee: B Kelly (Westmeath)

13 July
Final

Tipperary	2-21 - 0-19	Clare
J O'Brien 1-4, S Callinan 1-3, E Kelly 0-6 (2f), S McGrath 0-3, L Corbett 0-2, J Woodlock, P Kerwick, H Maloney 0-1 each.		N Gilligan 0-8 (5f), M Flaherty (3f), C Lynch 0-3 each, T Carmody 0-2, J Clancy, G Quinn, D McMahon 0-1 each.

Gaelic Grounds, Limerick
Attendance: 48,077
Referee: D Kirwan (Cork)
17 August
All Ireland Semi-final

Tipperary	1-18 - 1-20	Waterford
E Kelly 0-8 (6f), S Callinan 1-3, S McGrath 0-3, C O’Mahony (1f), L Corbett, P Kerwick, S Maher 0-1 each.		E Kelly 1-10 (8f), J Mullane 0-3, E McGrath, S Molumphy, M Walsh 0-2 each, J Kennedy 0-1.

Croke Park, Dublin
Attendance: 53,635
Referee: D Kirwan (Cork)

== 2009 ==
31 May
Quarter-final

Tipperary	1-19 - 0-19	Cork
S Callanan 1-3, E Kelly 0-5, N McGrath, L Corbett 0-3 each, B Dunne, S McGrath 0-2 each, J O'Brien 0-1	(Report)	B O'Connor 0-11, J Gardiner 0-3, P Cronin 0-2, N McCarthy, T Kenny, A Ó hAilpín 0-1 each

Semple Stadium, Thurles
Referee: B Kelly (Westmeath)

21 June
Semi-final

Tipperary	3-18 - 1-22	Clare
N McGrath 0-7, J O'Brien 1-2, L Corbett 1-1, S Callanan 1-0, P Kerwick, E Kelly 0-3 each, D Fanning, J Woodlock 0-1 each	(Report)	C Ryan 0-12, D McMahon 1-2, T Griffin, J Clancy, T Carmody 0-2 each, J Conlon, D Barrett 0-1 each

Gaelic Grounds, Limerick
Referee: J Owens (Wexford)

12 July
Final

Tipperary	4-14 - 2-16	Waterford
L Corbett 2-2, E Kelly 1-3, S Callanan 1-1, N McGrath 0-3, P Kerwick, C O'Mahony, S McGrath, J O'Brien, B Dunne 0-1 each	(Report)	E Kelly 1-7, J Mullane 1-5, S Molumphy 0-2, D Shanahan, R Foley 0-1 each

Semple Stadium, Thurles
Referee: J Sexton (Cork)
16 August
Semi-final

Tipperary	6-19 - 2-07	Limerick
L Corbett 3-1, E Kelly 1-6, N McGrath 1-3, P Kerwick 1-2, S Callanan, C O'Mahony 0-3 each, J O'Brien 0-1	(Report)	B O'Sullivan 1-1, B Murray 1-0, G O'Mahony 0-2, S Hickey, N Moran, D Breen, A O'Shaughnessy 0-1 each

Croke Park, Dublin
Referee: B Gavin (Offaly)

6 September
Final

Kilkenny	2-22 - 0-23	Tipperary
H Shefflin 1-8, E Larkin, E Brennan 0-3 each, M Comerford 1-0, R Hogan 0-2, J Tyrrell, T Walsh, D Lyng, R Power, TJ Reid, M Fennelly 0-1 each	(Report)	E. Kelly 0-13, L Corbett 0-4, S Callinan 0-3, N McGrath 0-2, S McGrath 0-1

Croke Park, Dublin
Referee: D Kirwan (Cork)
