= Michael Healy (hurler) =

Irish hurler (born 1978)

Personal information
- Native name: Mícheál Ó hÉilí (Irish)
- Born: 3 January 1978 (age 48) Castlegar, County Galway, Ireland
- Height: 5 ft 11 in (180 cm)

Sport
- Sport: Hurling
- Position: Full-back
Club
- Years: Club
- Castlegar
Club titles
- Galway titles: 0
Inter-county
- Years: County
- 1997-2002: Galway
Inter-county titles
- Connacht titles: 3
- All-Irelands: 0
- NHL: 0
- All Stars: 0

Michael Healy (born 3 January 1978) is an Irish hurler who played as a full-back for the Galway senior team.

Healy made his first appearance for the team during the 1997 championship and was a regular member of the starting fifteen until his retirement after the 2000 championship. During that time he won three successive Connacht winners' medals. Healy was an All-Ireland runner-up on one occasion.

At club level Healy plays with the Castlegar.

Sporting positions
Preceded by Vinnie Maher	Galway minor hurling team captain 1996	Succeeded by Eoin McDonagh
