= 1983–84 National Hurling League =

53rd season of the National Hurling League

League details
- Dates: 2 October 1983 – 8 April 1984

League champions
- Winners: Limerick (8th win)

Other division winners
- Division 2: Tipperary
- Division 3: Roscommon
- Division 4: Longford

The 1983–84 National Hurling League was the 53rd season of the National Hurling League.

== Division 1 ==
National Hurling League Division 1
- Season: 1983-84
- Champions: Limerick; 8th National League title Captain: Leonard Enright; Manager: Michael O'Grady
- Relegated: Clare; Waterford
- Matches played: 36
- Top goalscorer: Billy Fitzpatrick
- All statistics correct as of 6 March 2017.

Kilkenny came into the season as defending champions of the 1982-83 season.

On 8 April 1984, Limerick won the title after a 3-16 to 1-9 win over Wexford in the final. It was their 8th league title overall and their first since 1970-71.

=== Table ===
Pos	Team	Pld	W	D	L	Pts	Notes
1	Limerick	7	5	1	1	11	National League champions
2	Cork	7	5	0	2	10	
3	Wexford	7	4	0	3	8	
4	Laois	7	3	0	4	6	
5	Kilkenny	7	3	0	4	6	
6	Galway	6	3	0	3	6	
7	Waterford	7	3	0	4	6	Relegated to Division 2
8	Clare	6	0	1	5	1	Relegated to Division 2

=== Group stage ===
2 October 1983	Laois	3-7 - 1-11	Cork	O'Keeffe Park, Borris-in-Ossory
	M Walsh 1-1, P O'Brien 1-1, E Fennelly 1-0, B Bohane 0-3, PJ Cuddy 0-1, M Cuddy 0-1.		S O'Leary 0-4, T Mulcahy 1-0, E O'Donoghue 0-3, D McCurtain 0-1, F Collins 0-1, T Crowley 0-1, P Crowley.	Referee: J Kirwan (Offaly)

2 October 1983	Limerick	2-13 - 2-9	Kilkenny	Gaelic Grounds, Limerick
	J McKenna 2-2, P Kelly 0-4, D Fitzgerald 0-2, K O'Connor 0-2, T Henny 0-1, E Meskell 0-1, D Punch 0-1.		B Fitzpatrick 1-2, K Brennan 1-0, MJ Ryan 0-2, N Brennan 0-1, F Cummins 0-1, G Henderson 0-1, R Power 0-1.	Referee: G Ryan (Tipperary)

2 October 1983	Wexford	2-4 - 1-10	Waterford	St. Patrick's Park, Enniscorthy
	S Kinsella 1-1, J Walker 1-0, E Mythen 0-2, J McDonald 0-1.		P Bennett 0-7, T Larkin 1-2, S Breen 0-1.	Referee: P Long (Kilkenny)

16 October 1983	Cork	2-10 - 1-11	Limerick	Páirc Uí Chaoimh, Cork
	T Mulcahy 1-1, S O'Leary 1-0, J Fenton 0-2, T Cashman 0-2, D Walsh 0-2, B Óg Murphy 0-1, T Crowley 0-1, J Buckley 0-1.		O O'Connor 1-1, D Fitzgerald 0-3, P Kelly 0-2, E Meskell 0-2, T Kenny 0-1, J McKenna 0-1, B Carroll 0-1.	Referee: G Ryan (Tipperary)

16 October 1983	Waterford	0-9 - 2-13	Laois	Fraher Field, Dungarvan
	P Ryan 0-3, T Maher 0-3, S Ahearne 0-1, B Power 0-1, P Bennett 0-1.		PJ Cuddy 1-1, M Walsh 1-1, C Jones 0-4, E Fennelly 0-3, P O'Brien 0-2, M Brophy 0-1, P Critchley 0-1.

16 October 1983	Kilkenny	2-10 - 1-4	Clare	Nowlan Park, Kilkenny
	B Fitzpatrick 1-5, K Brennan 1-1, H Ryan 0-3, C Heffernan 0-1.		V Donnellan 1-1, G Sweeney 0-2, S Fitzpatrick 0-1.	Referee: N O'Donoghue (Dublin)

16 October 1983	Galway	2-11 - 2-14	Wexford	Duggan Park, Ballinasloe
	F Gantley 1-3, G Holland 1-1, PJ Molloy 0-4, B Forde 0-2.		T Harrington 1-6, J Walker 1-0, J Jordan 0-3, M Jordan 0-2, J McDonnell 0-1, J Conran 0-1, L Banville 0-1.	Referee: N Duggan (Limerick)

30 October 1983	Wexford	2-12 - 0-12	Kilkenny	Wexford Park, Wexford
	T Harrington 2-7, J Jordan 0-4, E Cleary 0-1.		B Fitzpatrick 0-8, C Heffernan 0-2, L Fennelly 0-1, G Henderson 0-1.

30 October 1983	Laois	1-9 - 4-8	Galway	O'Keeffe Park, Borris-in-Ossory
	B Bohane 0-6, M Walsh 1-1, E Fennelly 0-1, P Critchley 0-1.		PJ Molloy 1-2, B Forde 1-1, F Gantley 1-1, G Holland 1-0, B Lynskey 0-2, S Mahon 0-1, N Lane 0-1.

30 October 1983	Limerick	6-13 - 0-6	Waterford	Gaelic Grounds, Limerick
	O O'Connor 0-10, J McKenna 3-0, M Rea 1-1, D Fitzgerald 1-1, J Flanagan 1-0, J Mann 0-1.		P McGrath 0-5, L Power 0-1.

30 October 1983	Clare	0-7 - 1-13	Cork	Cusack Park, Ennis
	S Fitzpatrick 0-2, V Donnellan 0-2, T Nugent 0-1, J Shanahan 0-1, G McInerney 0-1.		D Walsh 1-4, J Fenton 0-3, D Boylan 0-3, J Buckley 0-1, S O'Leary 0-1, J Meyler 0-1.

13 November 1983	Galway	0-6 - 0-10	Limerick	Pearse Stadium, Galway
	S Linnane 0-2, S Mahon 0-1, O Kilkenny 0-1, M Connolly 0-1.		J McKenna 0-4, M Rea 0-1, P Foley 0-1, B Carroll 0-1, O O'Connor 0-1, E Mescall 0-1.	Referee: G Ryan (Tipperary)

13 November 1983	Kilkenny	3-13 - 1-10	Laois	Nowlan Park, Kilkenny
	B Fitzpatrick 0-6, L Fennelly 1-2, C Heffernan 1-1, H Ryan 1-1, K Brennan 0-2, F Cummins 0-1.		M Cuddy 1-1, B Bohane 0-4, L Bergin 0-3, PJ Cuddy 0-2.	Referee: N O'Donoghue (DUblin)

13 November 1983	Cork	2-11 - 1-9	Wexford	Clonmult Memorial Park, Midleton
	J Hartnett 1-2, J Fenton 1-1, E O'Donoghue 0-2, D Walsh 0-2, T Crowley 0-1, D Boylan 0-1, S O'Leary 0-1, F Collins 0-1.		J Jordan 0-7, T Harrington 1-0, G O'Connor 0-1, B Byrne 0-1.	Referee: K Walsh (Limerick)

13 November 1983	Waterford	1-10 - 0-10	Clare	Fraher Field, Dungarvan
	J Dalton 1-0, P Ryan 0-3, P Curran 0-2, M Walsh 0-2, L Power 0-2, McGrath 0-1.		C Lyons 0-7, A Nugent 0-2, M Nugent 0-1.	Referee: F Murphy (Cork)

27 November 1983	Kilkenny	1-9 - 1-13	Galway	Nowlan Park, Kilkenny
	B Fitzpatrick 0-6, L Fennelly 1-0, H Ryan 0-2, K Fennelly 0-1.		B Lynskey 1-1, F Gantley 0-4, PJ Molloy 0-4, J Holland 0-1, S Linnane 0-1, P Piggott 0-1, B Forde 0-1.	Referee: W Horgan (Cork)

27 November 1983	Wexford	3-7 - 2-6	Laois	Páirc Uí Shíocháin, Gorey
	T Harrington 1-4, E Mythen 1-1, M Quigley 1-0, J Murphy 0-1, G O'Connor 0-1.		M Walsh 1-0, M Cuddy 1-0, M Brophy 0-3, E Fennelly 0-1, PJ Cuddy 0-1, J Bohane 0-1.	Referee: P Long (Kilkenny)

27 November 1983	Cork	1-14 - 3-9	Waterford	Clonmult Memorial Park, Midleton
	D Walsh 0-5, T Mulcahy 1-0, B Óg Murphy 0-3, P Horgan 0-2, F Collins 0-1.		E Rockett 3-0, M Walsh 0-3, P Ryan 0-2, S Breen 0-2, T Maher 0-1, S Ahern 0-1.	Referee: K Walsh (Limerick)

27 November 1983	Clare	0-12 - 2-6	Limerick	Cusack Park, Ennis
	C Lyons 0-9, S Fitzpatrick 0-2, J Lynch 0-1.		D Murray 1-0, M Rea 1-0, O O'Connor 0-2, D Fitzgerald 0-2, P Foley 0-1, J Mann 0-1.	Referee: G Kirwan (Offaly)

12 February 1984	Waterford	0-11 - 2-13	Kilkenny	Walsh Park, Waterford
	M Walsh 0-5, S Breen 0-2, P Ryan 0-1, S Ahearne 0-1, T Maher 0-1, P McGrath 0-1.		B Fitzpatrick 1-9, C Heffernan 1-0, R Power 0-2, G Fennelly 0-1, H Ryan 0-1.	Referee: J Denton (Wexford)

12 February 1984	Laois	1-6 - 0-6	Clare	O'Keeffe Park, Borris-in-Ossory
	L Horgan 1-0, B Bohane 0-2, T Lannon 0-1, M walsh 0-1, E Fennelly 0-1, M Brophy 0-1.		C Lyons 0-5, S Fitzpatrick 0-1.	Referee: G Ryan (Tipperary)

12 February 1984	Limerick	2-6 - 1-7	Wexford	Gaelic Grounds, Limerick
	P Kelly 2-3, M Rea 0-2, J Carroll 0-1.		T Harrington 1-1, J Barron 0-2, M Quigley 0-1, P Courtney 0-1, J Conran 0-1, G O'Connor 0-1.	Referee: W Horgan (Cork)

12 February 1984	Galway	2-6 - 2-7	Cork	Duggan Park, Ballinasloe
	M Haverty 1-3, PJ Molloy 1-0, P Ryan 0-2, Joe Connolly 0-1, S Naughton 0-1.		S O'Leary 1-0, J Barry-Murphy 1-0, D Walsh 0-2, B Óg Murphy 0-1, J Fenton 0-1, K Hennessy 0-1, T Crowley 0-1, J Hartnett 0-1.	Referee: K Walsh (Limerick)

26 February 1984	Limerick	3-12 - 1-07	Laois	Gaelic Grounds, Limerick
	D Fitzgerald 1-2, L O'Donoghue 1-1, M Rea 1-1, P Kelly 0-3, O O'Connor 0-2, J McKenna 0-1, M Carroll 0-1, J Carroll 0-1.		E Fennelly 1-0, T Lennon 0-3, M Brophy 0-3, M Walsh 0-1.	Referee: W Horgan (Cork)

26 February 1984	Galway	5-14 - 1-02	Waterford	Pearse Stadium, Galway
	F Gantley 4-3, PJ Molloy 1-4, B Forde 0-2, C Hayes 0-1, M Connolly 0-1, A Staunton 0-1, J Connolly 0-1, J Boland 0-1.		T Maher 1-0, P Ryan 0-1, M Walsh 0-1.	Referee: N Duggan (Limerick)

26 February 1984	Cork	0-13 - 0-11	Kilkenny	Páirc Uí Chaoimh, Cork
	K Hennessy 0-5, J Fenton 0-2, C O'Neill 0-2, D Walsh 0-2, B Óg Murphy 0-1, J Barry-Murphy 0-1.		B Fitzpatrick 0-6, K Brennan 0-2, G Fennelly 0-1, P Lannon 0-1, C Heffernan 0-1.

26 February 1984	Wexford	4-11 - 0-08	Clare	O'Kennedy Park, New Ross
	J Jordan 1-5, M Quigley 2-1, T Harrington 1-0, J Barron 0-3, P Courtney 0-1, B Byrne 0-1.		C Lyons 0-6, D Coote 0-1, A Nugent 0-1.	Referee: P Langan (Kilkenny)

=== Play-offs ===
Semi-finals

4 March 1984 Semi-final	Laois	1-12 - 1-3	Waterford	Dr. Cullen Park, Carlow
	B Bohane 0-6, M Walsh 1-0, E Fennelly 0-2, PJ Cuddy 0-2, R Broderick 0-2.		C Curley 1-0, P Ryan 0-2, M Walsh 0-1.	Referee: G Ryan (Tipperary)

4 March 1984 Semi-final	Kilkenny	1-14 - 1-7	Galway	Gaelic Grounds, Limerick
	B Fitzpatrick 1-8, G Fennelly 0-3, K Brennan 0-1, R Heffernan 0-1, C Heffernan 0-1.		F Gantley 1-3, C Hayes 0-2, A Staunton 0-1, PJ Molloy 0-1.	Referee: W Horgan (Cork)

Final

11 March 1984 Final	Laois	2-14 - 2-12	Kilkenny	Croke Park, Dublin
	B Bohane 0-7, M Walsh 1-2, M Cuddy 1-0, M Cuddy 0-2, R Broderick 0-1, PJ Cuddy 0-1, T Lannon 0-1.		M Kelly 2-1, B Fitzpatrick 0-4, C Heffernan 0-3, K Brennan 0-2, R Power 0-1, S Fennelly 0-1.	Referee: S Ryan (Tipperary)

=== Relegation play-off ===
Relegation play-off	Galway	6-12 - 1-11	Waterford	Gaelic Grounds, Limerick
	F Gantley 3-5, J Connolly 3-3, B Lynskey 0-1, A Staunton 0-1, P Piggott 0-1, N Lane 0-1.		B McGrath 1-1, P Ryan 0-4, C Curley 0-3, S Ahern 0-1, K Ryan 0-1, P Bennett 0-1.	Referee: N Duggan (Limerick)

=== Knock-out stage ===
Quarter-finals

11 March 1984 Quarter-final	Wexford	0-14 - 0-12	Offaly	Croke Park, Dublin
	J Jordan 0-6, P Courtney 0-2, M Quigley 0-2, T Harrington 0-2, B Bynre 0-2.		P Corrigan 0-3, J Dooley 0-2, P Carroll 0-2, P Delaney 0-2, B Keeshan 0-1, M Corrigan 0-1, L Currams 0-1.	Referee: N O'Donoghue (Dublin)

25 March 1984 Quarter-final	Tipperary	1-14 - 0-9	Laois	Nowlan Park, Kilkenny
	P McGrath 0-8, S Power 1-2, N English 0-1, M Doyle 0-1, L Maher 0-1, J McIntyre 0-1.		B Bohane 0-4, G Phelan 0-2, PJ Cuddy 0-1, M Walsh 0-1, P Critchley 0-1.	Referee: P Long (Kilkenny)

Semi-finals

1 April 1984 Semi-final	Limerick	2-10 – 1-10	Tipperary	Semple Stadium, Thurles
	P Kelly 1-7, J McKenna 1-1, M Rea 0-1, L O'Donoghue 0-1.		P McGrath 0-8, T Waters 1-0, S Power 0-1, R Callaghan 0-1.	Referee: P Long (Kilkenny)

1 April 1984 Semi-final	Wexford	4-9 – 1-14	Cork	Semple Stadium, Thurles
	J McDonald 2-3, J Jordan 0-5, J O'Connor 1-0, J Walker 1-0, M Quigley 0-1.		J Fenton 1-9, J Barry-Murphy 1-0, D Walsh 0-3, C O'Neill 0-1, K Hennessy 0-1.	Referee: N O'Donoghue (Dublin)

Final

8 April 1984 Final	Limerick	3-16 – 1-9	Wexford	Semple Stadium, Thurles
	P Kelly 0-12, J McKenna 2-1, M Rea 1-0, J Flanagan 0-1, O O'Connor 0-1, D Fitzgerald 0-1.		J Jordan 0-5, T Harrington 1-1, J McDonald 0-1, J O'Connor 0-1, P Courtney 0-1.	Attendance: 19,445; Referee: G Ryan (Tipperary)

=== Scoring statistics ===
Top scorers overall

Rank	Player	Team	Tally	Total	Matches	Average
1	Billy Fitzpatrick	Kilkenny	4-54	66	9	7.33
2	Finbarr Gantley	Galway	10-19	49		
3	Tom Harrington	Wexford	8-21	45		
4	Paddy Kelly	Limerick	3-31	40		
5	John Jordan	Wexford	1-35	38		
6	John McKenna	Limerick	8-10	34	9	3.77
7	Billy Bohane	Laois	0-32	32		
8	Cyril Lyons	Laois	0-27	27		
9	Mick Walsh	Laois	6-08	26		
10	P. J. Molloy	Galway	3-15	24		
10	John Fenton	Cork	2-18	24		

Top scorers in a single game

Rank	Player	Team	Tally	Total	Opposition
1	Finbarr Gantley	Galway	4-03	15	Waterford
2	Finbarr Gantley	Galway	3-05	14	Waterford
3	Tom Harrington	Wexford	2-07	13	Kilkenny
4	Joe Connolly	Galway	3-03	12	Waterford
4	John Fenton	Cork	1-09	12	Wexford
4	Billy Fitzpatrick	Kilkenny	1-09	12	Waterford
4	Paddy Kelly	Limerick	0-12	12	Wexford
5	Billy Fitzpatrick	Kilkenny	1-08	11	Galway
6	Paddy Kelly	Limerick	1-07	10	Tipperary
6	Ollie O'Connor	Limerick	0-10	10	Waterford

== Division 2 ==
=== Table ===
Pos	Team	Pld	W	D	L	Pts	Notes
1	Tipperary	7	6	0	1	12	Division 2 champions
2	Offaly	7	6	0	1	12	Promoted to Division 1
3	Westmeath	7	5	1	1	11	
4	Kerry	7	3	1	3	7	
5	Dublin	7	3	0	4	6	
6	Antrim	7	2	0	5	4	
7	Kildare	7	2	0	5	4	
8	Wicklow	7	0	0	7	0	Relegated to Division 3

== Division 3 ==
=== Table ===
Pos	Team	Pld	W	D	L	Pts	Notes
1	Roscommon	7	7	0	0	14	Division 3 champions
2	Down	7	6	0	1	12	
3	Armagh	7	3	1	3	7	
4	Meath	7	3	1	3	7	
5	Carlow	6	1	2	3	4	
6	Derry	7	1	2	4	4	
7	Mayo	6	2	0	4	4	
8	Cavan	7	1	0	6	2	Relegated to Division 4
