= Finbarr Gantley =

Irish hurler (1950–2021)

Personal information
- Native name: Fionbarra Mag Sheanlaoich (Irish)
- Born: 1 September 1950 Shanaglish, County Galway, Ireland
- Died: 16 July 2021 (aged 70) Tubber, County Galway, Ireland
- Occupation: Farmer
- Height: 5 ft 8 in (173 cm)

Sport
- Sport: Hurling
- Position: Right wing-forward
Clubs
- Years: Club
- Seán McDermotts; Brothers Pearse; St. Gabriel's; Beagh
Club titles
- London titles: 6
Inter-county
Years	County	Apps (scores)
1977-1982	Galway	11 (3-10)
Inter-county titles
- All-Irelands: 1
- NHL: 0
- All Stars: 0

Finbarr Gantley (1 September 1950 – 16 July 2021) was an Irish hurler who played for a number of club sides, including St. Gabriel's and Beagh. He also lined out at inter-county level with the Warwickshire, London and Galway senior hurling teams.

== Career ==
Born near Shanaglish on the County Clare-Galway border, Gantley had an uncle, Paddy Gantley, who had played with the Galway senior hurling team in the 1940s and is regarded as one of their greatest ever players. After emigrating to the UK at the age of 16, Gantley won County Championship titles with the Brothers Pearse and St. Gabriel's clubs. He also lined out with Warwickshire and London, losing five All-Ireland finals across the junior, intermediate and senior B grades. After returning to Ireland Gantley joined the Beagh club and was drafted onto the Galway senior team. He lined out in three successive All-Ireland finals, coming on as a substitute for Galway's 1980 All-Ireland final defeat of Limerick.

== Personal life and death ==
Gantley's sons Finbarr Jnr, Rory, and Joe also hurled for the Galway senior team in the 1990s, 2000s, and 2010s. He died in Tubber, County Galway on 16 July 2021.

== Honours ==
Brothers Pearse

- London Senior Hurling Championship: 1968, 1972

St Gabriel's

- London Senior Hurling Championship: 1973, 1974, 1976, 1977

Beagh

- Galway Intermediate Hurling Championship: 1980

Galway

- All-Ireland Senior Hurling Championship: 1980
