= Thomas Costello (hurler) =

Irish hurler (born 1978)

Personal information
- Native name: Tomás Mac Coisteala (Irish)
- Born: 23 September 1978 (age 48) Cappawhite, County Tipperary, Ireland
- Occupation: Water caretaker
- Height: 6 ft 0 in (183 cm)

Sport
- Sport: Hurling
- Position: Left corner-back
Club
- Years: Club
- Cappawhite
Club titles
- Tipperary titles: 0
Inter-county*
Years	County	Apps (scores)
2001-2004	Tipperary	17 (0–00)
Inter-county titles
- Munster titles: 1
- All-Irelands: 1
- NHL: 1
- All Stars: 0
- *Inter County team apps and scores correct as of 16:47, 1 April 2015.

Thomas Costello (born 23 September 1978) is an Irish hurling coach and former player. At club level, he played with Cappawhite and at inter-county level with the Tipperary senior hurling team.

== Playing career ==
At club level, Costello first played with Cappawhite at juvenile and underage levels. He won several divisional minor and under-21 titles, as well as the Tipperary U21HC title as team captain in 1999. By that stage, Costello had progressed to adult level with Cappawhite and won three West Tipperary SHC titles between 2000 and 2005.

Costello first appeared on the inter-county scene with Tipperary at minor level. He won a Munster MHC medal, as well as being corner-back on the team that won the All-Ireland MHC title in 1996. His subsequent three seasons with the under-21 team ended with a Munster U21HC medal in 1999.

Costello made his senior team debut during the National Hurling League in 2001. He ended that competition with a winners' medal after Tipperary claimed the title after a 1–19 to 0–17 defeat of Clare in the final. Tipperary made a clean sweep of all the major hurling competitions that season, with Costello later winning a Munster SHC before Tipperary beat Galway in the 2001 All-Ireland final.

At inter-provincial level, Costello also earned selection to the Munster team and also won a Railway Cup medal in 2001 after a six-point defeat of Connacht. He left the inter-county scene in 2004.

== Coaching career ==
Costello became a selector as part of Brendan Cummins's Tipperary under-21 hurling management team in October 2022. During his tenure, the team won the Munster U20HC title before losing the 2024 All-Ireland under-20 final to Offaly.

== Honours ==
=== Player ===
Cappawhite

- West Tipperary Senior Hurling Championship (3): 2000, 2001, 2005
- Tipperary Under-21 Hurling Championship (1): 1999

Tipperary

- All-Ireland Senior Hurling Championship (1): 2001
- Munster Senior Hurling Championship (1): 2001
- National Hurling League (1): 2001
- Munster Under-21 Hurling Championship (1): 1999
- All-Ireland Minor Hurling Championship (1): 1996
- Munster Minor Hurling Championship (1): 1996

Munster

- Railway Cup (1): 2001

=== Management ===
Tipperary

- All-Ireland Under-20 Hurling Championship (1): 2025
- Munster Under-20 Hurling Championship (2): 2024, 2025
