= Donnacha Fahy =

Irish sportsperson

Personal information
- Native name: Donnacha Ó Fathaigh (Irish)
- Born: Clonmel, County Tipperary

Sport
- Sport: Hurling
- Position: Corner-back
Club
- Years: Club
- St Mary's (Tipperary)
Inter-county
- Years: County
- 1999-2002: Tipperary
Inter-county titles
- Munster titles: 0
- All-Irelands: 1
- NHL: 1

Donnacha Fahy (born 1979 in Clonmel, County Tipperary) is an Irish sportsperson. He plays hurling with his local club St. Mary's (Tipperary) and was a member of the Tipperary GAA senior inter-county team in the 1990s and 2000s, winning All-Ireland and National Hurling League honours with his native-county.
