= Joe Bergin (hurler) =

Irish hurler

Personal information
- Native name: Seosamh Ó Beirgin (Irish)
- Nickname: Chucky
- Born: 22 September 1987 (age 39) Tullamore, County Offaly, Ireland
- Occupation: Blocklayer
- Height: 1.93 m (6 ft 4 in)

Sport
- Sport: Hurling
- Position: Full-forward
Club
- Years: Club
- 2005-present: Seir Kieran
Club titles
- Offaly titles: 0
Inter-county*
Years	County	Apps (scores)
2006-2020	Offaly	47 (18-74)
Inter-county titles
- Leinster titles: 0
- All-Irelands: 0
- NHL: 0
- All Stars: 0
- *Inter County team apps and scores correct as of 22:42, 16 January 2020.

Joseph Bergin (born 22 September 1987) is an Irish hurler who plays for Offaly Championship club Seir Kieran. He was a member of the Offaly senior hurling team for 14 seasons, during which time he usually lined out as a full-forward.

== Playing career ==
=== Seir Kieran ===
Bergin joined the Seir Kieran club at a young age and played in all grades at juvenile and underage levels, enjoying championship success in the under-21 grade in 2008.

=== Offaly ===
==== Minor and under-21 ====
Bergin first played for Offaly as a member of the minor team during the 2004 Leinster Championship. He made his first appearance on 10 April when he came on as a 23rd-minute substitute for Colin O'Meara in a 0–14 to 1–10 defeat of Laois.

Bergin was again eligible for the minor team for the 2005 Leinster Championship. He progressed onto the Offaly under-21 team during the 2006 Leinster Championship. He made his first appearance on 21 June when he scored two points in 0–17 to 1–11 defeat by Dublin.

On 18 June 2007, Bergin lined out in the Leinster final. He scored 1-01 from full-forward in the 2–18 to 3–09 defeat by Dublin.

Bergin lined out at full-forward in a second consecutive Leinster final on 24 July 2008. He top scored for Offaly with 2–01 in the 2–21 to 2–09 defeat by Kilkenny. It was his last game in the grade.

==== Senior ====
Bergin was just 18-years-old when he was added to the Offaly senior team for the 2006 National League. He made his first appearance on 19 February and scored 1–01 in a 1–21 to 2–18 draw with Cork. Bergin made his first appearance in the Leinster Championship on 21 May. He scored 1-01 from full-forward in 2–12 to 0–08 defeat of Laois.

On 3 May 2009, Bergin lined out at full-forward when Offaly faced Wexford in the National League Division 2 final. In spite of being held scoreless he collected a winners' medal following the 1–13 to 0–13 victory.

On 15 January 2020, Bergin announced his retirement from inter-county hurling.

=== Leinster ===
Bergin was selected for the Leinster inter-provincial team for the first time during the 2007 Championship. He made his first appearance on 14 October and scored a goal in the 2–19 to 0–12 defeat of Ulster in the semi-final. Bergin was switched to full-forward for the final against Connacht on 28 October. He scored 1-03 from play and collected a Railway Cup winners' medal after the 1–23 to 0–17 victory.

On 1 November 2008, Bergin was an unused substitute when Leinster faced Munster in the 2008 Railway Cup final. He collected a winners' medal following the 1–15 to 1–12 victory.

Bergin returned to the Leinster starting fifteen during the 2009 Championship. On 14 March, he was at full-forward when Leinster faced Connacht in the final. Bergin scored 1-01 and collected a third winners' medal after the 3–18 to 1–17 victory.

After the championship's two-year absence, Bergin was again included on the Leinster team for the 2012 Championship. On 4 March, he scored two points from centre-forward when Leinster defeated Connacht by 2–19 to 1–15 to win the title.

On 1 March 2014, Bergin was included as a substitute on the Leinster team that faced Connacht in the Railway Cup final. He was introduced as a substitute for Jack Guiney and collected a fifth winners' medal following a 1–23 to 0–16 victory.

== Career statistics ==
As of match played 15 June 2019.

Team	Year	National League			McDonagh Cup		Leinster		All-Ireland		Total	
Team	Year	Division	Apps	Score	Apps	Score	Apps	Score	Apps	Score	Apps	Score
Offaly	2006	Division 1A	6	4-11	—		2	1-02	3	3-04	11	8-17
Offaly	2007	Division 1A	6	6-31	—		2	0-02	3	0-01	11	6-34
Offaly	2008	Division 1B	5	0-07	—		2	0-02	2	3-03	9	3-12
Offaly	2009	Division 2	8	0-15	—		1	0-02	2	0-04	11	0-21
Offaly	2010	Division 1	7	1-11	—		3	2-06	2	0-04	12	3-21
Offaly	2011	Division 1	7	2-14	—		1	0-03	1	0-01	9	2-18
Offaly	2012	Division 1B	5	0-13	—		2	1-03	1	0-03	8	1-19
Offaly	2013	Division 1B	3	1-06	—		1	2-00	1	0-02	5	3-08
Offaly	2014	Division 1B	6	1-29	—		1	0-01	2	0-08	9	1-38
Offaly	2015	Division 1B	6	0-14	—		1	0-01	1	0-01	8	0-16
Offaly	2016	Division 1B	6	2-06	—		5	4-07	1	0-01	12	6-14
Offaly	2017	Division 1B	—		—		2	0-01	1	0-03	3	0-04
Offaly	2018	Division 1B	5	1-17	—		4	2-09	—		9	3-26
Offaly	2019	Division 1B	4	4-25	4	1-26	—		—		8	5-51
Career total			74	22-199	4	1-26	27	12-39	20	6-35	125	41-299

== Honours ==
Seir Kieran

- Offaly Intermediate Hurling Championship (1): 2019
- Offaly Under-21 A Hurling Championship (1): 2008
- Offaly Senior Hurling League (Pat Carroll Cup) (2): 2011, 2016
- Offaly Senior 'B' Hurling Championship (1): 2019

Offaly

- National Hurling League Division 2 (1): 2009

Leinster

- Railway Cup (5): 2006, 2008, 2009, 2012, 2014

Ireland

- Shinty/Hurling International Series (2): 2009, 2011

Sporting positions
Preceded by David Kenny	Offaly Senior Hurling Captain; 2014	Succeeded by Dan Currams
