= Joe Gantley =

Joe Gantley is an Irish hurler who played his club hurling for Beagh, and also played at inter-county level with Galway.

== Career ==
Gantley was member of the Galway senior hurling panel from 2009 until 2011, and made his first championship start for Galway on 29 May 2010 in the 2010 Leinster Hurling Championship against Wexford.

== Personal life ==
Gantley is the son of former Galway hurler Finbarr Gantley who played in three successive All-Ireland finals, coming on as a substitute for Galway's 1980 All-Ireland final defeat of Limerick. He is also the brother of Finbarr Jnr and Rory who also played hurling for Galway.

== Honours ==
=== Galway ===
- National Hurling League (1): 2010
- Walsh Cup (1): 2010
- All-Ireland Intermediate Hurling Championship (1): 2002

=== Beagh ===
- Galway Intermediate Hurling Championship (1): 2002
