= Michael Haverty =

Irish hurler and referee

Personal information
- Native name: Mícheál Ó hAbhartaigh (Irish)
- Born: 1961 (age 64–65) Killimordaly, County Galway, Ireland

Sport
- Sport: Hurling
- Position: Midfield
Club
- Years: Club
- Killimordaly Loughrea
Club titles
- Galway titles: 2
- Connacht titles: 2
- All-Ireland Titles: 0
Inter-county
Years	County	Apps (scores)
1984-1985	Galway	1 (0-00)
Inter-county titles
- All-Irelands: 0
- NHL: 0
- All Stars: 0

Michael Haverty (born 1961) is an Irish former hurler and referee who played as a midfielder for the Galway senior team.

Haverty joined the team during the 1984-85 National League and was a regular member of the team for just one season. During that time he ended up as an All-Ireland runner-up.

At club level Haverty is a two-time Connacht medalist, the first with Killimordaly in 1986, and again in 2006 with Loughrea. In addition to this he has also won two county club championship medals.
