= Colm Farrell =

Irish sportsperson

Personal information
- Native name: Colm Ó Fearail (Irish)
- Born: Bunclody, County Wexford

Sport
- Sport: Hurling
- Position: Midfield
Club
- Years: Club
- 1965-present: HWH–Bunclody
Club titles
- Wexford titles: 0
Inter-county
- Years: County
- 2008-2017: Wexford
Inter-county titles
- Leinster titles: 0
- All-Irelands: 0
- NHL: 1 (Div 2)
- All Stars: 0

Colm Farrell is an Irish sportsperson. He plays hurling with his local club HWH–Bunclody and has been a member of the Wexford senior inter-county team since 2008.

== Playing career ==
Farrell made his championship debut against Dublin in the Leinster Semi-final which ended in a replay. He never featured in the 2009 Hurling Championship after he suffered a broken leg which ruled him out for the season. He however returned at the start of 2010 and claimed his first National Hurling league medal. But Wexford were soon early exited by Galway in Leinster and Tipperary in the qualifiers.
