= Diarmuid Cloonan =

Irish hurler

Personal information
- Native name: Diarmuid Ó Cluanáin (Irish)
- Born: 1980 (age 45–46) Athenry, County Galway, Ireland

Sport
- Sport: Hurling
- Position: Full Back
Club
- Years: Club
- 1998-2011: Athenry
Club titles
- Galway titles: 5
- Connacht titles: 5
- All-Ireland Titles: 2
Inter-county
- Years: County
- 2001-2007: Galway
Inter-county titles
- Connacht titles: 0
- All-Irelands: 0
- NHL: 1
- All Stars: 0

Diarmuid Cloonan (born 1980) is an Irish hurler who played as a full-back for the Galway senior team.

== Biography ==
Born in Athenry, County Galway, Cloonan first played competitive hurling whilst at school at Athenry Vocational School. He arrived on the inter-county scene at the age of seventeen when he first linked up with the Galway minor team, before later joining the under-21 side. He joined the senior panel for the 2001 championship. Cloonan went on to play a bit part for Galway for the next few years, and won one National Hurling League medal. He was an All-Ireland runner-up as a non-playing substitute on one occasion.

As a member of the Connacht inter-provincial team at various times, Cloonan won a Railway Cup runner-up on one occasion. At club level he is a two-time All-Ireland medallist with Athenry. In addition to this he also won four Connacht medals and four championship medals.

Cloonan's retirement came following the conclusion of the 2007 championship.

His brother, Eugene, also played at all levels with Galway, and is regarded as one of the county's greatest-ever forwards.

== Honours ==
=== Team ===
Athenry

- All-Ireland Senior Club Hurling Championship (2): 2000, 2001
- Connacht Senior Club Hurling Championship (5): 1998, 1999, 2000, 2002, 2004
- Galway Senior Club Hurling Championship (5): 1998, 1999, 2000, 2002, 2004

Galway

- National Hurling League (1): 2004
