= David Kenny (hurler) =

Irish hurler

Personal information
- Native name: Daithí Ó Cionnaith (Irish)
- Born: 1987 (age 38–39) Belmont, County Offaly, Ireland
- Occupation: Environmental manager

Sport
- Sport: Hurling
- Position: Full-back
Club
- Years: Club
- Belmont
Club titles
- Offaly titles: 0
College
- Years: College
- NUI Galway
College titles
- Fitzgibbon titles: 0
Inter-county*
Years	County	Apps (scores)
2007-2014	Offaly	25
Inter-county titles
- Leinster titles: 0
- All-Irelands: 0
- NHL: 0
- All Stars: 0
- *Inter County team apps and scores correct as of 21:57, 20 October 2021.

David Kenny (born 1987) is an Irish hurler who plays for Offaly Senior Championship club Belmont. He is a former player and selector at inter-county level with the Offaly senior hurling team.

== Career ==
Kenny made his first appearance for the team during the 2007 championship and has become a regular player over the last few seasons. During that time he has enjoyed little success, however, he has won a National League (Division 2) winners' medal and a Walsh Shield winners' medal.

At club level Kenny plays with Belmont.

Kenny played for NUI Galway in the Fitzgibbon Cup, and was part of the side that lost the 2007 final.

Sporting positions
Preceded by Shane Dooley	Offaly Senior Hurling Captain; 2012-2013	Succeeded by Joe Bergin
