= Paddy Gantley =

Irish hurler

Paddy Gantly
Personal information
- Native name: Pádraig Mag Sheanlaoich (Irish)
- Born: Ardrahan, County Galway

Sport
- Sport: Hurling
- Position: Midfield
Club
- Years: Club
- Ardrahan
Inter-county
- Years: County
- 1945-1949: Galway
Inter-county titles
- Connacht titles: 0
- All-Irelands: 0

Fr. Paddy Gantly (1919–2002) was an Irish sportsperson and priest. He played hurling at various times with his local clubs Ardrahan in Galway and St Finbarr's in Cork. Gantly also played at senior level for the Galway county team from 1945 until 1949. He is regarded as one of Galway’s greatest-ever players.
