= Paddy Corrigan =

Irish former hurler

Personal information
- Native name: Pádraig Ó Corragáin (Irish)
- Born: 27 January 1962 (age 64) Kinnitty, County Offaly
- Occupation: ESB clerk
- Height: 5 ft 9 in (175 cm)

Sport
- Sport: Hurling
- Position: Midfield
Club
- Years: Club
- 1970s-1990s: Kinnitty
Inter-county
Years	County	Apps (scores)
1983-1993	Offaly	18 (3-58)
Inter-county titles
- Leinster titles: 3
- All-Irelands: 1

Paddy Corrigan (born 24 August 1944) is an Irish former hurler. Born in Kinnitty, he played for his local club Kinnitty and was a member of the Offaly senior inter-county team from 1983 until 1993.
