= Ger Mahon =

Irish hurler

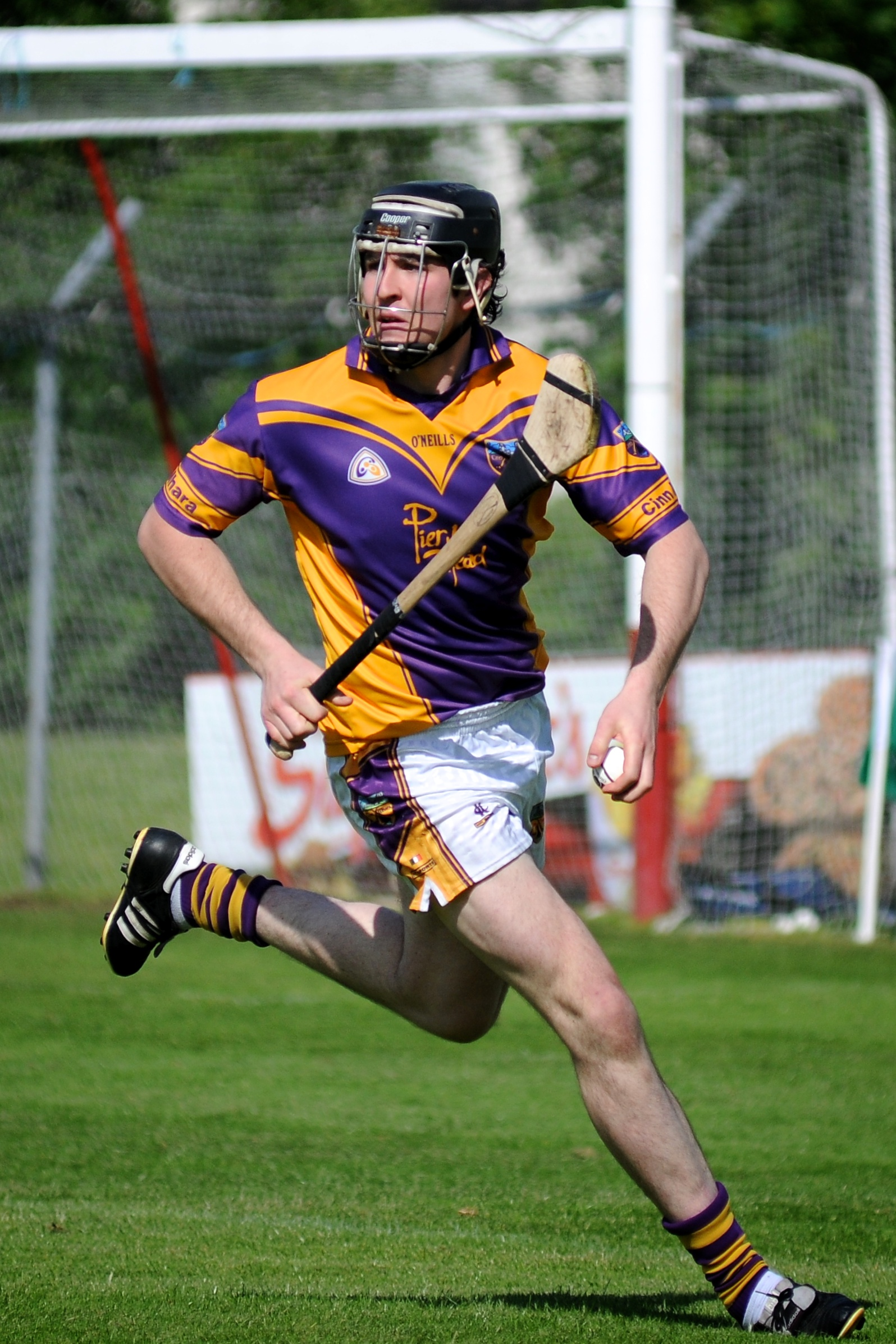
- Ger Mahon in action for Kinvara in 2013

Personal information
- Native name: Gearóid Mac Mathúna (Irish)
- Born: 1986 (age 39–40) Kinvara, County Galway, Ireland
- Height: 6 ft 3 in (191 cm)

Sport
- Sport: Hurling
- Position: Left wing-back
Club
- Years: Club
- Kinvara
Club titles
- Galway titles: 0
Inter-county
Years	County	Apps (scores)
2005-2010	Galway	11 (0-2)
Inter-county titles
- All-Irelands: 0
- NHL: 0
- All Stars: 0

Gerard "Ger" Mahon (born 1986) is an Irish hurler who played as a left wing-back for the Galway senior team.

Mahon joined the team during the 2005 championship and was a regular member of the team for six seasons. An All-Ireland medalist in the minor and under-21 grades, he enjoyed little success at senior level.

At club level Mahon plays with the Kinvara club.
