= Brian Costello (hurler) =

Irish hurler

Personal information
- Native name: Brian Mac Coisteala (Irish)
- Born: 1984 (age 41–42) Abbeyknockmoy, County Galway, Ireland
- Occupation: Carpenter

Sport
- Sport: Hurling
- Position: Full-back
Clubs
- Years: Club
- Abbeyknockmoy; St Gabriel's
Club titles
- London titles: 1
Inter-county
- Years: County
- 2011-present: London
Inter-county titles
- Connacht titles: 0
- All-Irelands: 3
- NHL: 0
- All Stars: 1

Brian Costello (born 1984) is an Irish hurler who plays as a full-back at senior level for the London county team.

Costello played inter-county hurling with Galway's minor, under-21, intermediate and senior teams, having captained the intermediate team in 2008 and was a member of the senior panel in 2009. Costello emigrated to London in 2011 where he linked up with the London senior hurling team. As an inter-county hurler he has won one under-21 all Ireland, one Christy Ring Cup winners' medal and one Nicky Rackard Cup winners' medal.

In 2012 Costello was named the Christy Ring Hurler of the Year in addition to being awarded a GPA All-Star for his contribution to the London Christy Ring winning team.

At club level Costello is a two-time county senior championship medalist with St Gabriel's. He previously played with Abbeyknockmoy.
