= Mark Kerins =

Irish hurler

Personal information
- Native name: Marc Ó Ceirín (Irish)
- Born: 1979 (age 46–47) Galway, Ireland
- Occupation: Novartis Market Access
- Height: 1.85 m (6 ft 1 in)

Sport
- Sport: Hurling
- Position: Centre forward
Club
- Years: Club
- Clarinbridge
Club titles
- Galway titles: 2
- Connacht titles: 1
- All-Ireland Titles: 1
Inter-county
Years	County	Apps (scores)
1999-2008	Galway	? (1-7)
Inter-county titles
- Connacht titles: 0
- All-Irelands: 0
- NHL: 1
- All Stars: 0

Mark Kerins (born 1979) is an Irish hurler who played as a centre-forward for the Galway senior team.

Born in Clarinbridge, County Galway, Kerins first arrived on the inter-county scene at the age of eighteen when he first linked up with the Galway minor team, before later joining the under-21 side. He joined the senior team for the 1999 championship. Kerins went on to play a bit part for Galway at various times for almost a decade, and won one National Hurling League medal. He was an All-Ireland runner-up on one occasion.

As a member of the Connacht inter-provincial team at various times, Kerins won two Railway Cup medals. At club level he is a one-time All-Ireland medallist with Clarinbridge. In addition to this he also won one Connacht medal and two championship medals.

His retirement came following the conclusion of the 2008 championship.

Kerins's brother, Alan, enjoyed a lengthy career as a dual player with Galway.

== Honours ==
=== Team ===
Clarinbridge

- All-Ireland Senior Club Hurling Championship (1): 2011
- Connacht Senior Club Hurling Championship (2): 2001
- Galway Senior Club Hurling Championship (2): 2001, 2010

Galway

- National Hurling League (1): 2000

Connacht

- Railway Cup (2): 1999, 2004
