= 1967–68 National Hurling League =

37th season of the National Hurling League

1967-68 National Hurling League
League details
- Dates: 8 October 1967 – 1 October 1968

League champions
- Winners: Tipperary (13th win)

Other division winners
- Division 2: Kerry
- Division 3: Louth

The 1967–68 National Hurling League was the 37th season of the National Hurling League.

== Division 1 ==
National Hurling League Division 1
- Season: 1967-68
- Champions: Tipperary; 13th National League title Captain: Mick Roche
- Matches played: 58
- Top goalscorer: Jimmy Doyle (4-50)
- Biggest home win: Tipperary 7-8 - 0-4 Laois (5 November 1967)
- Biggest away win: Galway 1-7 - 7-9 Clare (4 February 1968)
- All statistics correct as of 15 January 2017.

Wexford came into the season as defending champions of the 1966-67 season.

On 16 June 1968, Tipperary won the title following a 6–27 to 4–22 aggregate win over New York in the finals. It was their first league title since 1964-65 and their 12th National League title overall.

Tipperary's Jimmy Doyle was the Division 1 top scorer with 4-50.

=== Division 1A table ===
Pos	Team	Pld	W	D	L	Diff	Pts	Notes
1	Kilkenny	5	4	1	0	36	9	
2	Tipperary	5	3	1	1	26	7	Division 1 champions
3	Wexford	5	3	1	1	16	7	
4	Waterford	5	2	0	3	-12	4	
5	Offaly	5	1	1	3	-8	3	
6	Laois	5	0	0	5	-58	0	

=== Group stage ===
8 October 1967	Wexford	4-10 - 4-4	Laois	Páirc Uí Shíocháin, Gorey
	T Doran 2-0, S Whelan 1-1, P Lynch 0-4, J O'Brien 1-0, P Donoghue 0-3, M Gardiner 0-1, J Murphy 0-1.		S Cuddy 2-1, O Fennell 1-1, G Conroy 1-1, T Mahony 0-1.

8 October 1967	Tipperary	3-11 - 2-11	Offaly	Thurles Sportsfield, Thurles
	J Doyle 0-5, J McKenna 1-1, D Nealon 1-0, F Lowry 1-0, J Ryan 0-2, PJ Ryan 0-2, M Roche 0-1.		B Moylan 1-6, T Dooley 1-0, S Burke 0-2, J Flaherty 0-1, A Mulhaire 0-1, JJ Healion 0-1.

22 October 1967	Laois	2-9 - 8-10	Kilkenny	Kelly Daly Park, Rathdowney

22 October 1967	Offaly	3-13 - 5-7	Wexford	St. Brendan's Park, Birr
	B Moylan 1-5, P Mulhaire 1-1, P Spellman 1-0, P Molloy 0-3, JJ Healion 0-2, J Flaherty 0-2.		J O'Brien 3-0, P Lynch 2-3, P Wilson 0-2, P Donoghue 0-2.	Referee: J O'Brien (Westmeath)

22 October 1967	Waterford	1-6 - 2-12	Tipperary	Walsh Park, Waterford
	D Mahon 1-1, T Cheasty 0-2, N Power 0-2, V Connors 0-1.		M Keating 1-2, J Doyle 0-4, J McKenna 1-0, M Roche 0-3, J Flanagan 0-2, J O'Connor 0-1.	Referee: D O'Brien (Cork)

5 November 1967	Tipperary	7-8 - 0-4	Laois	Páirc Shíleáin, Templemore
	M Keating 4-0, J Doyle 2-3, D Nealon 1-1, PJ Ryan 1-1, D Connors 0-3.		PJ 0-2, D Conroy 0-1, J Cuddy 0-1.

19 November 1967	Waterford	4-7 - 3-8	Offaly	Fraher Field, Dungarvan
	D Mahon 2-2, W Walsh 2-0, J Foley 0-3, J Kirwan 0-1, V Connors 0-1.		P Molloy 2-4, P Spellman 1-0, P Mulhare 0-1, J Flaherty 0-1, B Moylan 0-1, G Burke 0-1.

26 November 1967	Kilkenny	2-11 - 1-6	Waterford	Nowlan Park, Kilkenny
	C Dunne 0-5, B Pehlan 1-1, D Blanchfield 1-0, M Brennan 0-2, J Bennett 0-1, S Cleere 0-1, P Moran 0-1.		T Cheasty 1-0, J Condon 0-2, J Kirwan 0-2, L Guinan 0-1, W Walsh 0-1.	Referee: P Brosnan (Wexford)

4 February 1968	Kilkenny	1-10 - 1-7	Wexford	Nowlan Park, Kilkenny
	C Dunne 0-5, J Lynch 1-0, J Bennett 0-2, M Brennan 0-1, S Cleere 0-1, B Phelan 0-1.		T Doran 1-1, D Quigley 0-2, P Lynch 0-2, P Wilson 0-1, S Whelan 0-1.	Referee: S Power (Waterford)

18 February 1968	Laois	1-8 - 2-10	Waterford	Fr. Breen Park, Abbeyleix
	J Lyons 1-2, B Delaney 0-2, D Conroy 0-2, P Dowling 0-1, S Bergin 0-1.		J Kirwan 1-1, N Power 1-1, V Connors 0-2, J Aherne 0-2, D Mahon 0-2, J Phelan 0-1, L Guinan 0-1.

18 February 1968	Wexford	3-12 - 0-10	Tipperary	O'Kennedy Park, New Ross
	P Lynch 1-8, J Berry 2-0, T Doran 0-2, P Wilson 0-1, P Donoghue 0-1.		J Doyle 0-4, PJ Ryan 0-2, D Nealon 0-1, M Roche 0-1, J Ryan 0-1, M Keating 0-1.	Referee: S Power (Waterford)

18 February 1968	Offaly	2-12 - 3-15	Kilkenny	St. Brendan's Park, Birr
	B Moylan 0-8, P Spellman 1-0, D Hanniffy 1-0, M Walshe 0-1, J Flaherty 0-1, PJ Whelehan 0-1, JJ Healion 0-1.		E Keher 0-8, J Bennett 1-3, B Phelan 1-1, M Brennan 1-0, F Cummins 0-2, M Coogan 0-1.	Referee: J O'Brien (Westmeath)

3 March 1968	Tipperary	0-12 - 2-6	Kilkenny	Thurles Sportsfield, Thurles
	J Doyle 0-5, D Nealon 0-2, M Keating 0-1, J McLoughlin 0-1, J Flanagan 0-1, J Ryan 0-1, PJ Ryan 0-1.		E Keher 1-3, C Dunne 1-0, B Phelan 0-2, F Cummins 0-1.	Referee: M Hayes (Clare)

3 March 1968	Waterford	2-9 - 3-8	Wexford	Fraher Field, Dungarvan
	L Guinan 1-2, C Mahon 1-1, F Whelan 0-1, S Hearne 0-1, F Walsh 0-1, V Connors 0-1, L Canning 0-1, J Geoghegan 0-1.		D Quigley 1-2, J Berry 1-1, T Doran 1-0, P Lynch 0-2, S Whelan 0-1, M Jacob 0-1, P Wilson 0-1.	Referee: D O'Brien (Cork)

3 March 1968	Laois	3-11 - 4-11	Offaly	St. Fintan's Park, Mountrath
	J Lyons 1-5, D Conroy 1-1, G Cuddy 1-1, P O'Mahony 0-2, G Conroy 0-1, S Bergin 0-1.		P Molloy 2-3, M Flaherty 2-0, J Flaherty 0-4, P Moylan 0-1, M Walsh 0-1, P Walsh 0-1, J Whelan 0-1.	Referee: P Ryan (Tipperary)

=== Division 1B table ===
Pos	Team	Pld	W	D	L	Diff	Pts	Notes
1	Limerick	4	0	1	3	-21	8	
2	Cork	4	3	1	0	16	7	
3	Clare	4	3	0	1	37	6	
4	Galway	4	2	0	2	-15	4	
5	Dublin	4	1	0	3	-17	2	

=== Group stage ===
22 October 1967	Cork	5-13 - 6-3	Galway	Cork Athletic Grounds, Cork
	C McCarthy 3-2, T Ryan 1-3, M Kenneally 1-1, J McCarthy 0-4, G McCarthy 0-2, C Sheehan 0-1.		D Coen 3-0, P Mitchell 1-2, J O'Mahony 1-0, B Lally 1-0, S Gohery 0-1.	Referee: G Fitzgerald (Limerick)

5 November 1967	Limerick	1-5 - 1-5	Cork	Gaelic Grounds, Limerick
	T Bluett 1-0, E Grimes 0-3, S Quaid 0-1, E Cregan 0-1.		G McCarthy 1-0, S Barry 0-2, C McCarthy 0-1, C Roche 0-1, J O'Halloran 0-1.

5 November 1967	Galway	0-12 - 0-8	Dublin	Ballinasloe
	D Coen 0-6, J Connolly 0-3, S Cohery 0-1, PJ Qualter 0-1, B Lally 0-1.		B Cooney 0-3, F Whelan 0-3, E Flynn 0-2.

26 November 1967	Clare	6-8 - 3-5	Limerick	Cusack Park, Ennis
	M Keane 3-0, P Cronin 1-3, P McNamara 1-1, L Danaher 1-0, N Pyne 0-3, P Henchy 0-1.		B Savage 1-1, L Grimes 1-0, E Cregan 0-2, E Grimes 0-2.	Referee: J Duggan (Galway)

4 February 1968	Galway	1-7 - 7-9	Clare	Ballinasloe
	J Connolly 0-6, S Coen 1-0, JJ Murphy 0-1.		M Arthur 2-1, P Cronin 1-4, P Henchy 1-2, M Keane 1-1, N Pyne 1-0, P McNamara 0-1.	Referee: E O'Brien (Westmeath)

4 February 1968	Dublin	1-9 - 1-14	Cork	Croke Park, Dublin
	H Dalton 0-4, E Flynn 0-4, A Boothman 1-0, N Kinsella 0-1.		S Barry 0-10, M Kenneally 1-0, G McCarthy 0-2, J McCarthy 0-1, C Sheehan 0-1.	Referee: T Ryall (Kilkenny)

18 February 1968	Cork	3-12 - 4-4	Clare	Cork Athletic Grounds, Cork
	S Barry 1-8, G McCarthy 1-3, C McCarthy 1-0, E O'Brien 0-1.		P Cronin 2-0, P Henchy 1-2, N Pyne 1-0, N Jordan 0-1, John Cullinane 0-1.	Referee: G Fitzgerald (Limerick)

18 February 1968	Dublin	2-9 - 1-11	Limerick	Croke Park, Dublin
	N Kinsella 1-2, F Whelan 1-0, B Grahim 0-2, E Flynn 0-2, E Davey 0-1, H Dalton 0-1, D Foley 0-1.		S Quaid 1-1, E Cregan 0-4, B Savage 0-2, T O'Brien 0-2, C Grimes 0-1, PJ Keane 0-1.	Referee: P Johnston (Kilkenny)

3 March 1968	Limerick	1-5 - 3-7	Galway	Gaelic Grounds, Limerick
	R Bennis 0-4, S Quaid 1-0, M Grace 0-1.		JJ O'Dea 2-0, F Glynn 1-0, J Connolly 0-5, M Regan 0-2	Referee: F Moloney (Tipperary)

3 March 1968	Clare	4-8 - 2-4	Dublin	Cusack Park, Ennis
	P Henchy 2-2, P Cronin 0-5, P McNamara 1-0, M Arthur 1-0, L Danaher 0-1.		E Flynn 2-0, A Boothman 0-3, B Galvin 0-1.	Referee: G Fitzgerald (Limerick)

=== Play-off ===
31 March 1968 Play-off	Tipperary	1-19 - 5-5	Wexford	Croke Park, Dublin
	J Doyle 0-11, D Nealon 1-3, M Burns 0-2, L Devaney 0-1, PJ Ryan 0-1, J Ryan 0-1.		P Lynch 3-2, J O'Brien 1-1, L Doran 1-0, V Staples 0-1, L Quigley 0-1.

=== Knock-out stage ===
Semi-finals

31 March 1968 Semi-final	Tipperary	1-15 - 2-7	Cork	Gaelic Grounds, Limerick
	D Nealon 1-5, M Keating 0-2, J McKenna 0-1, J Flanagan 0-1, J Ryan 0-1.		C McCarthy 1-1, E O'Brien 1-0, J McCarthy 0-3, G McCarthy 0-2, S Barry 0-1.	Referee: G Fitzgerald (Limerick)

7 April 1968 Semi-final	Clare	2-10 - 2-10	Kilkenny	Thurles Sportsfield, Thurles
	P Cronin 0-4, M Arthur 1-0, M Keane 1-0, T Ryan 0-2, N Jordan 0-1, J Dunne 0-1, N Pyne 0-1, L Danaher 0-1.		C Dunne 1-4, E Keher 1-4, F Cummins 0-1, M Brennan 0-1.	Referee: J Dowling (Offaly)

21 April 1968 Semi-final first replay	Kilkenny	3-8 - 3-8	Clare	Thurles Sportsfield, Thurles
	J Lynch 2-0, C Dunne 1-2, E Keher 0-3, M Brennan 0-2, B Phelan 0-1.		P Cronin 1-3, N Jordan 1-2, M Arthur 1-0, T Ryan 0-1, N Pyne 0-1, P Henchy 0-1.	Referee: J Hatton (Wicklow)

28 April 1968 Semi-final second replay	Kilkenny	1-11 - 1-7	Clare	Thurles Sportsfield, Thurles
	E Keher 0-6, M Brennan 1-0, J Lynch 0-2, J Kinsella 0-1, P Moran 0-1, C Dunne 0-1.		P Cronin 1-2, P Henchy 0-2, N Pyne 0-2, M Arthur 0-1.	Referee: J Duggan (Galway)

Home final

12 May 1968 Home final	Tipperary	3-9 - 1-13	Kilkenny	Croke Park, Dublin
	J Doyle 1-5, D Nealon 1-1, S McLoughlin 1-0, M Keating 0-1, M Burns 0-1, J Flanagan 0-1.		E Keher 0-9, C Dunne 1-1, J Lynch 0-1, J Bennett 0-1, P Moran 0-1.	Attendance: 27,892; Referee: J Fitzgerald (Limerick)

Finals

15 June 1968 First leg	New York	2-14 - 2-13	Tipperary	Gaelic Park, New York City
	J O'Donoghue 1-1, B Kelleher 0-4, P Egan 1-0, M Bermingham 0-3, P Dowling 0-2, H McCabe 0-2, B Hennessy 0-1, M Curtin 0-1.		J Doyle 0-7, J Ryan 1-1, S McLoughlin 1-0, M Keating 0-2, M Burns 0-1, M Keating 0-1, P Boland 0-1.	Referee: J Dowling (Offaly)

16 June 1968 Second leg	New York	2-8 - 4-14	Tipperary	Gaelic Park, New York City
	M Bermingham 0-5, M Mortell 1-0, P Kirby 1-0, D Long 0-1, P Dowling 0-1, M Curtin 0-1.		J Doyle 1-6, S McLoughlin 2-1, J Ryan 1-0, M Keating 0-2, P Lowry 0-2, PJ Ryan 0-1, S Flanagan 0-1, D Nealon 0-1.	Attendance: 8,000; Referee: J Dowling (Offaly)

=== Scoring statistics ===
Top scorers overall

Rank	Player	Team	Tally	Total	Matches	Average
1	Jimmy Doyle	Tipperary	4-50	62	9	6.88
2	Eddie Keher	Kilkenny	2-33	39	6	6.50
2	Paul Lynch	Wexford	6-21	39	6	6.50
2	Pat Cronin	Clare	6-21	39	7	5.57
5	Donie Nealon	Tipperary	5-14	29	8	3.62

Top scorers in a single game

Rank	Player	Team	Tally	Total	Opposition
1	Michael Keating	Tipperary	4-00	12	Laois
2	Charlie McCarthy	Cork	3-02	11	Galway
2	Paul Lynch	Wexford	3-02	11	Tipperary
2	Jimmy Doyle	Tipperary	0-11	11	Wexford
5	Paddy Molloy	Offaly	2-04	10	Waterford
5	Seánie Barry	Cork	0-10	10	Dublin
7	Jimmy O'Brien	Wexford	3-00	9	Offaly
7	Des Coen	Galway	3-00	9	Cork
7	Milo Keane	Clare	3-00	9	Limerick
7	Paul Lynch	Wexford	2-03	9	Offaly
7	Jimmy Doyle	Tipperary	2-03	9	Laois
7	Barney Moylan	Offaly	1-06	9	Tipperary
7	Jimmy Doyle	Tipperary	1-06	9	New York
7	Eddie Keher	Kilkenny	0-09	9	Tipperary

== Division 2 ==
National Hurling League Division 2
- Season: 1967-68
- Champions: Kerry; 4th Division 2 title
- All statistics correct as of 15 January 2017.

Kerry came into the season as defending champions of the 1966-67 season.

On 26 May 1968, Kerry won the title following a 2–11 to 1–9 win over Antrim in the finals. It was their fourth Division 2 title overall and their second league title in succession.

=== Knock-out stage ===
Semi-finals

21 April 1968 Semi-final	Antrim	2-11 - 2-5	Westmeath	Croke Park, Dublin

28 April 1968 Semi-final	Kerry	4-11 - 4-9	Wicklow	Croke Park, Dublin

Final

26 May 1968 Final	Kerry	2-11 - 1-9	Antrim	Croke Park, Dublin
	E O'Sullivan 1-0, T Kirby 1-0, T Nolan 0-3, D Lovett 0-3, E Digan 0-2, T McEnery 0-1, T Kenny 0-1, J Barry 0-1.		B McGarry 1-1, E Donnelly 0-2, S Burns 0-2, B Boylan 0-1, P McShane 0-1, S McMullan 0-1, L Richmond 0-1.	Referee: S Murphy (Kilkenny)

== Division 3 ==
National Hurling League Division 3
- Season: 1967-68
- Champions: Louth; 2nd Division 3 title
- All statistics correct as of 3 March 2017.

Louth came into the season as defending champions of the 1966-67 season.

On 5 May 1968, Louth won the title after a 2–2 to 1–2 win over Donegal in the final. It was their second league title overall and their second in succession.

=== Division 3A table ===
Pos	Team	Pld	W	D	L	Pts	Notes
1	Louth	3	3	0	0	6	Division 3 champions
2	Armagh	3	1	1	1	3	
3	Tyrone	3	1	0	2	2	
4	Monaghan	3	0	1	2	1	

=== Division 3B table ===
Pos	Team	Pld	W	D	L	Pts	Notes
1	Donegal	4	4	0	0	8	
2	Sligo	4	1	1	2	3	
3	Leitrim	4	0	1	3	1	

=== Knock-out stage ===
Final

5 May 1968 Final	Louth	2-2 - 1-2	Donegal	O'Neill Park, Dungannon
