= Tom O'Donoghue =

Irish hurler (1940–2020)

Personal information
- Native name: Tomás Ó Donnchú (Irish)
- Born: 1940 Mayfield, Cork, Ireland
- Died: 15 May 2020 (aged 79) Wilton, Cork, Ireland
- Height: 5 ft 9 in (175 cm)

Sport
- Sport: Hurling
- Position: Full-back
Clubs
- Years: Club
- Mayfield; Sarsfields
Club titles
- Cork titles: 0
Inter-county
Years	County	Apps (scores)
1964–1969	Cork	17 (0–00)
Inter-county titles
- Munster titles: 2
- All-Irelands: 1
- NHL: 1

Thomas O'Donoghue (1940 – 15 May 2020) was an Irish hurler. His career included stints with club sides Mayfield and Sarsfields, while he was also an All-Ireland Championship winner with the Cork senior hurling team in 1966.

After impressing at club level, O'Donoghue was drafted onto the Cork senior team in 1964. From his debut, he quickly became the team's first-choice full-back and made 17 championship appearances in a career that ended with his last game in 1969. During that time O'Donoghue was part of Cork's 1966 All-Ireland Championship-winning team. He also secured two Munster Championship medals and a National League title.

== Playing career ==
=== Sarsfields ===
O'Donoghue began hurling as a pupil at Mayfield National School before later lining out with Sullivan's Quay CBS in a number of underage and juvenile competitions. He joined the Mayfield club and competed in the City Junior Championship before transferring to the Sarsfields club after being courted by a number of city clubs.

=== Cork ===
O'Donoghue first played for Cork as a member of the minor team during the 1958 Munster Minor Championship. He lined out at left wing-back in the 2-15 to 3-07 defeat by Clare in what was Cork's only game of the championship.

After having no involvement with Cork at any grade after his sole year as a minor, O'Donoghue was drafted onto the senior team during the 1964 Oireachtas Cup. He made his debut for the team on 4 October 1964 when he was selected at full-back for the 3-11 to 1-02 defeat by Kilkenny. O'Donoghue was later included on Cork's panel for the 1964-65 National League before making his Munster Championship debut on 4 July 1965 in a 2-06 apiece draw with Waterford. He later lined out in his first Munster final, however, Cork were beaten by Tipperary by 4-11 to 0-05. O'Donoghue's arrival on the team was seen as solving Cork's problem position of full-back and he was described as being the best occupant of the number three jersey since John Lyons.

O'Donoghue lined out in a second successive provincial decider when Cork faced Waterford in the 1966 Munster final. He ended the game with his first winners' medal after the 4-09 to 2-09 victory. On 4 September 1966, O'Donoghue lined out in his first All-Ireland final when he was selected at full-back against Kilkenny. His display was described in the Cork Examiner as being "stolid" and he claimed an All-Ireland medal after the 3-09 to 1-10 victory.

After surrendering their titles the following season, O'Donoghue lined out in a third Munster final of his career in 1968. He ended the game on the losing side after a 2-13 to 1-07 defeat by Tipperary.

O'Donoghue claimed a National League winners' medal following Cork's 3-12 to 1-14 defeat of Wexford to secure the 1968-69 title. Later that season he won a second Munster Championship medal after a 4-06 to 0-09 defeat of Tipperary in the 1969 Munster final. O'Donoghue made his second appearance in an All-Ireland final on 7 September 1969, however, he ended the game on the losing side after the 2-15 to 2-09 defeat by Kilkenny. His inter-county career ended shortly after this defeat when he failed to be included on the panel for the 1969-70 National League.

=== Munster ===
O'Donoghue was honoured with selection at full-back on the Munster inter-provincial team for the 1968 Railway Cup. He claimed his first Railway Cup medal that season when Munster defeated Leinster by 0-14 to 0-10 in the final. O'Donoghue was again called up for selection with the Munster team in 1969 and ended the campaign with a second successive Railway Cup medal after a 3-13 to 4-04 replay defeat of Connacht.

== Death ==
O'Donoghue died aged 79 on 15 May 2020.
