= Noel O'Gorman =

Irish hurler

Personal information
- Native name: Nollaig Ó Gormáin (Irish)
- Born: December 1945 (age 80) Newport, County Tipperary, Ireland
- Occupation: Sales rep
- Height: 5 ft 11 in (180 cm)

Sport
- Sport: Hurling
- Position: Full-back
Club
- Years: Club
- Newport
Club titles
- Tipperary titles: 0
Inter-county
- Years: County
- 1965-1969: Tipperary
Inter-county titles
- Munster titles: 3
- All-Irelands: 1
- NHL: 2

Thomas Noel O'Gorman (born December 1945) is an Irish former hurler. At club level he played with Newport and was also a member of the Tipperary senior hurling team.

== Career ==
O'Gorman first played hurling at juvenile and underage levels with the Newport club. He progressed to adult level and was part of the Newport team that won the North Tipperary IHC title in 1965. O'Gorman later served as a coach at various levels with the club.

O'Gorman never played at minor with Tipperary but spent three consecutive seasons with the under-21 team, including one as team captain. He was at full-back on the first Tipperary team to win an All-Ireland U21HC title in 1964. O'Gorman quickly joined the senior team and was an unused substitute for the 1965 All-Ireland final defeat of Wexford. A year with the intermediate team yielded All-Ireland success in 1966. O'Gorman won consecutive Munster SHC medals on the field of play in 1967 and 1968, however, Tipperary suffered consecutive All-Ireland final defeats to Kilkenny and Wexford.

== Honours ==
Newport

- North Tipperary Intermediate Hurling Championship: 1965

Tipperary

- All-Ireland Senior Hurling Championship: 1965
- Munster Senior Hurling Championship: 1965, 1967, 1968
- National Hurling League: 1964-65, 1967-68
- All-Ireland Intermediate Hurling Championship: 1966
- Munster Intermediate Hurling Championship: 1966
- All-Ireland Under-21 Hurling Championship: 1964
- Munster Under-21 Hurling Championship: 1964, 1965

Sporting positions
Preceded by Owen Killoran	Tipperary under-21 hurling team captain 1966	Succeeded by P. J. Ryan
