= 1966–67 National Hurling League =

36th season of the National Hurling League

League details
- Dates: 2 October 1966 – 1 October 1967
- Teams: 28

League champions
- Winners: Wexford (3rd win)

Other division winners
- Division 2: Kerry
- Division 3: Louth

The 1966–67 National Hurling League was the 36th season of the National Hurling League.

== Division 1 ==
National Hurling League Division 1
- Season: 1966-67
- Champions: Wexford; 3rd National League title Captain: Jimmy O'Brien
- Matches: 26
- Top goalscorer: Eddie Keher (6-48)
- Biggest home win: Kilkenny 10-14 - 1-4 Laois (23 October 1966)
- Biggest away win: Laois 2-3 - 8-7 Wexford (20 November 1966)
- Highest scoring: Kilkenny 10-14 - 1-4 Laois (23 October 1966)
- All statistics correct as of 20 February 2017.

Kilkenny came into the season as defending champions of the 1965-66 season. Offaly joined Division 1 as the promoted team.

On 28 May 1967, Wexford won the title after a 3-10 to 1-9 win over Kilkenny in the final. It was their 3rd league title overall and their first since 1957-58.

In spite of finishing at the bottom of their respective groups, neither Galway of Laois were relegated as there was no promotion-relegation this season.

Kilkenny's Eddie Keher was the Division 1 top scorer with 6-48.

=== Division 1A table ===
Pos	Team	Pld	W	D	L	Diff	Pts	Notes
1	Kilkenny	5	4	0	1	56	8	Division 1 runners-up
2	Wexford	5	4	0	1	22	8	Division 1 champions
3	Offaly	5	3	0	2	25	6	
4	Tipperary	5	3	0	2	15	6	
5	Waterford	5	1	0	4	-29	2	
6	Laois	5	0	0	5	-89	0	

=== Group stage ===
2 October 1966	Waterford	2-9 - 3-13	Kilkenny	Fraher Field, Dungarvan
	D Mahon 1-3, T Cheasty 1-2, F Walsh 0-3, J Meaney 0-1.		E Keher 1-5, T Walsh 1-2, C Dunne 0-5, J Bennett 1-0, P Carroll 0-1.	Referee: P Cronin (Cork)

23 October 1966	Tipperary	2-14 - 2-10	Waterford	Páirc Dáibhín, Carrick-on-Suir
	T Nealon 1-2, T English 0-5, S McLoughlin 1-0, J Ryan (Carrick) 0-2, M Roche 0-2, J Flanagan 0-2, J Ryan (Fenner) 0-1.		T Cheasty 0-6, J Warren 1-1, D Mahon 1-1, F Walsh 0-2.

23 October 1966	Kilkenny	10-14 - 1-4	Laois	Nowlan Park, Kilkenny
	E Keher 2-11, P Carroll 4-0, T Walsh 1-1, S Buckley 1-1, J Teehan 1-1, J Bennett 1-0.		P Dillon 1-0, P Payne 0-3, J Lyons 0-1.

6 November 1966	Wexford	3-5 - 0-8	Kilkenny	O'Kennedy Park, New Ross
	C Jacob 2-1, S Whelan 1-1, O Cullen 0-2, W Murphy 0-1.		E Keher 0-7, J Teehan 0-1.	Referee: S Power (Waterford)

6 November 1966	Offaly	4-10 - 1-6	Waterford	St. Brendan's Park, Birr
	B Barry 2-1, B Moylan 0-5, J Flaherty 0-4, W Gorman 1-0, T Dooley 1-0.		D Mahon 1-0, P Enright 0-2, F Walsh 0-2, J Warren 0-1, D Duggan 0-1.	Referee: P Ryan (Tipperary)

20 November 1966	Offaly	3-13 - 2-7	Tipperary	St. Brendan's Park, Birr
	P Molloy 2-5, P Mulhare 1-2, J Flaherty 0-3, B Barry 0-2, B Moylan 0-1.		D Nealon 2-3, J Ryan 0-2, M Keating 0-1, L Devaney 0-1.	Referee: P O'Brien (Westmeath)

20 November 1966	Laois	2-3 - 8-7	Wexford	Kelly Daly Park, Rathdowney
	M Mahon 2-0, P Dillon 0-1, S Cashin 0-1, J Lyons 0-1.		B Ronan 4-0, T Doran 2-2, S Whelan 1-0, C Jacob 1-0, O Cullen 0-2, L Butler 0-2, C Dowdall 0-1.	Referee: T Leyne (Kildare)

27 November 1966	Laois	0-9 - 4-8	Tipperary	Kelly Daly Park, Rathdowney
	B Delaney 0-3, T Dowling 0-2, T Creagh 0-1, J Lyons 0-1, S Cashin 0-1, M Kelly 0-1.		D Nealon 1-1, N Seymour 1-1, J Ryan 1-1, J Fogarty 1-1, M McKenna 0-2, L Delaney 0-1, S McLoughlin 0-1.

5 February 1967	Wexford	5-8 - 3-8	Offaly	Páirc Uí Shíocháin, Gorey
	T Doran 3-0, P Quigley 2-0, P Wilson 0-3, C Dowdall 0-1, S Whelan 0-1, J Foley 0-1, O Cullen 0-1, W Murphy 0-1.		B Johnson 2-0, W Gorman 1-0, P Molloy 0-3, J Flaherty 0-2, JJ Healion 0-1, P Spellman 0-1, S Lambe 0-1.	Referee: P Johnston (Kilkenny)

12 February 1967	Kilkenny	2-15 - 1-9	Offaly	Nowlan Park, Kilkenny
	E Keher 2-10, J Teehan 0-3, D Blanchfield 0-1, M Brennan 0-1.		T Dooley 1-2, P Molloy 0-5, J Flaherty 0-1, W Gorman 0-1.

12 February 1967	Waterford	4-6 - 3-7	Laois	McGrath Park, Tramore
	T Cheasty 2-1, L Guinan 1-2, V Connors 1-0, J Whelan 0-1, John Kirwan 0-1, T Ahern 0-1.		Pierce Dooley 2-1, Brian Delaney 1-2, PJ Payne 0-1, J Lyons 0-1, P Dowling 0-1, P Creagh 0-1.	Referee: J Maddock (Wexford)

12 February 1967	Tipperary	4-12 - 1-3	Wexford	Thurles Sportsfield, Thurles
	M Keating 2-3, J McKenna 1-3, D Nealon 0-5, L Kiely 1-0, T English 0-1.		E Cousins 1-0, W Murphy 0-1, D Shannon 0-1, C Dowdall 0-1.	Referee: S Power (Waterford

12 March 1967	Kilkenny	5-7 - 2-7	Tipperary	Nowlan Park, Kilkenny
	M Brennan 3-0, E Keher 1-4, D Blanchfiedl 1-2, C Dunne 0-1.		Jimmy Doyle 0-6, M Keating 1-0, J McKenna 1-0, D Nealon 0-1.	Referee: S Power (Waterford)

12 March 1967	Wexford	4-10 - 3-6	Waterford	Wexford Park, Wexford
	M Byrne 3-1, D Shannon 0-5, P Quigley 1-0, J O'Brien 0-2, W Murphy 0-1, T Doran 0-1.		V Connors 2-0, M Scanlan 1-0, J Whelan 0-2, F Whelan 0-1, P Enright 0-1, S Hearne 0-1, D Mahon 0-1.	Referee: P Johnston (Kilkenny)

12 March 1967	Offaly	7-13 - 3-7	Laois	St. Brendan's Park, Birr
	P Molloy 2-5, B Barry 2-2, A Dooley 2-1, J Flaherty 0-4, JJ Healion 1-0, B Moylan 0-1.		P Dooley 2-3, M Kelly 1-1, P Dowling 0-1, S Cashin 0-1, D Conroy 0-1.

=== Division 1A final ===
2 April 1967 Final	Kilkenny	1-9 - 3-10	Wexford	Nowlan Park, Kilkenny
	T Walsh 1-4, D Blanchfield 1-0, M Coogan 0-2, M Brennan 0-1, F Cummins 0-1, P Moran 0-1.		D Shannon 1-3, J O'Brien 1-1, T Doran 1-0.

=== Division 1B table ===
Pos	Team	Pld	W	D	L	Diff	Pts	Notes
1	Limerick	4	4	0	0	24	8	
2	Clare	4	2	0	2	13	4	
3	Cork	4	2	0	2	12	4	
4	Dublin	4	2	0	2	-6	4	
5	Galway	4	0	0	4	-43	0	

=== Group stage ===
9 October 1966	Clare	6-10 - 4-7	Galway	Cusack Park, Ennis
	P Vaughan 2-1, M Arthur 2-1, N Pyne 1-2, P Cronin 0-5, M Kane 1-1.		M Fox 3-5, PJ Qualter 1-0, M Regan 0-1, F Coffey 0-1.	Referee: T Sullivan (Limerick)

23 October 1966	Galway	2-7 - 4-7	Dublin	Athenry
	PJ Qualter 1-2, J Duggan 1-0, M Fox 0-3, S Murphy 0-1, P Reilly 0-1.		J Keaveney 2-0, H Dalton 0-4, A Boothman 1-0, N Kinsella 1-0, B Cooney 0-1, T Woods 0-1, E Flynn 0-1.

6 November 1966	Limerick	3-6 - 0-7	Galway	Gaelic Grounds, Limerick
	R Bennis 2-1, P O'Brien 1-0, E Cregan 0-3, B Hartigan 0-2.		J Conroy 0-4, F Coffey 0-1, J Conway 0-1, P Mitchell 0-1.

20 November 1966	Cork	1-10 - 1-7	Clare	Cork Athletic Grounds, Cork
	J McCarthy 0-6, J Bennett 1-0, C Roche 0-1, G McCarthy 0-1, J O'Halloran 0-1, C McCarthy 0-1.		P Cronin 0-4, M Keane 1-0, P Vaughan 0-1, H McCabe 0-1, D Loftus 0-1.	Referee: S Moloney (Tipperary)

20 November 1966	Dublin	1-5 - 3-11	Limerick	Croke Park, Dublin
	T McGrath 1-0, E Flynn 0-3, H Dalton 0-1, T Woods 0-1.		R Bennis 1-3, T Bluett 1-1, S Casey 1-0, B Hartigan 0-3, P O'Brien 0-1, M Savage 0-1, D Flynn 0-1, E Cregan 0-1.	Referee: J Hatton (Wicklow)

5 February 1967	Dublin	3-15 - 2-10	Cork	Croke Park, Dublin
	N Kinsella 2-0, A Boothman 0-5, H Dalton 0-5, T Woods 1-0, E Flynn 0-3, G O'Driscoll 0-1, B McPartland 0-1.		J Russell 1-1, J O'Halloran 1-1, C McCarthy 0-4, G McCarthy 0-2, J McCarthy 0-2.	Referee: J Hatton (Wicklow)

12 February 1967	Clare	3-8 - 2-3	Dublin	Cusack Park, Ennis
	P Cronin 0-5, H McCabe 1-1, M Arthur 1-0, M Keane 1-0, P Vaughan 0-1, N Pyne 0-1.		J Keaveney 1-1, P Moyle 1-0, H Dalton 0-1, E Flynn 0-1.	Referee: P Duggan (Galway)

19 February 1967	Cork	2-4 - 3-4	Limerick	Cork Athletic Grounds, Cork
	S Barry 1-2, C Sheehan 1-1, J McCarthy 0-1.		A Dunworth 2-0, M Cregan 1-0, E Cregan 0-3, S Quaid 0-1.	Referee: S Moloney (Tipperary)

12 March 1967	Limerick	0-10 - 1-6	Clare	Gaelic Grounds, Limerick
	E Cregan 0-5, A Dunworth 0-2, K Long 0-1, E Carey 0-1, R Bennis 0-1.		M Keane 1-1, P Cronin 0-3, N Pyne 0-1, T Slattery 0-1.	Referee: P Moloney (Tipperary)

12 March 1967	Galway	1-8 - 7-10	Cork	Ballinasloe
	J Faul 1-0, B Lally 0-3, P Fahy 0-1, F Coffey 0-1, J Conroy 0-1, S Devlin 0-1, M Fox 0-1.		A O'Flynn 3-0, C McCarthy 2-3, J O'Halloran 1-3, J Bennett 1-1, J McCarthy 0-3.	Referee: M Hayes (Clare)

=== Play-offs ===
2 April 1967 Play-off	Clare	3-9 - 2-11	Cork	Gaelic Grounds, Limerick
	P Cronin 1-4, M Keane 0-5, N Jordan 1-0, P McNamara 1-0.		S Barry 0-6, C McCarthy 1-1, J O'Halloran 1-0, J McCarthy 0-3, J Bennett 0-1.

16 April 1967 Play-off	Dublin	0-17 - 3-9	Clare	Croke Park, Dublin
	N Dalton 0-5, E FLynn 0-4, A Boothman 0-2, T McGrath 0-2, P Moyles 0-2, N Kinsella 0-2.		P Cronin 1-3, P Vaughan 0-4, M Keane 1-0, J Smyth 1-0, P Henchy 0-2.	Referee: P Johnston (Kilkenny)

=== Knock-out stage ===
Semi-finals

7 May 1967 Semi-final	Wexford	6-12 – 1-11	Limerick	Croke Park, Dublin
	P Quigley 3-1, T Doran 2-3, P Lynch 1-6, J Murphy 0-1, P Wilson 0-1.		E Cregan 0-4, E Carey 1-0, P Murphy 0-2, B Hartigan 0-2, A Dunworth 0-1, R Bennis 0-1, A O'Brien 0-1.	Referee: C Foley (Dublin)

14 May 1967 Semi-final	Kilkenny	3-10 – 2-3	Clare	Croke Park, Dublin
	M Brennan 2-0, P Carroll 1-0, E Keher 0-3, T Walsh 0-3, D Blanchfield 0-2, S CLeere 0-2.		M Keane 1-0, P McNamara 1-0, P Cronin 0-3.	Referee: P Ryan (Tipperary)

Final

28 May 1967 Final	Wexford	3-10 – 1-9	Kilkenny	Croke Park, Dublin
	C Jacob 1-1, P Lynch 0-4, F Duff 1-0, T Doran 1-0, P Wilson 0-2, S Whelan 0-1, J O'Brien 0-1, J Murphy 0-1.		E Keher 0-8, T Walsh 1-0, C Dunne 0-1.	Referee: G Fitzgerald (Limerick)

=== Scoring statistics ===
Top scorers overall

Rank	Player	Team	Tally	Total	Matches	Average
1	Eddie Keher	Kilkenny	6-48	66	7	9.42
2	Tony Doran	Wexford	9-06	33	6	5.50
3	Pat Cronin	Clare	2-27	33	7	4.71
4	Paddy Molloy	Offaly	4-18	30	4	7.50
5	Donie Nealon	Tipperary	4-12	24	5	4.80

Top scorers in a single game

Rank	Player	Team	Tally	Total	Opposition
1	Eddie Keher	Kilkenny	2-11	17	Laois
2	Eddie Keher	Kilkenny	2-10	16	Offaly
3	Mattie Fox	Galway	3-05	14	Clare
4	Pat Carroll	Kilkenny	4-00	12	Laois
4	Barry Ronan	Wexford	4-00	12	Laois
6	Paddy Molloy	Offaly	2-05	13	Tipperary
6	Paddy Molloy	Offaly	2-05	13	Laois
8	Martin Byrne	Wexford	3-01	10	Waterford
8	Pat Quigley	Wexford	3-01	10	Limerick
10	Tony Doran	Wexford	3-00	9	Offaly
10	Martin Brennan	Kilkenny	3-00	9	Tipperary
10	Andrew O'Flynn	Cork	3-00	9	Galway
10	Donie Nealon	Tipperary	2-03	9	Offaly
10	Michael Keating	Tipperary	2-03	9	Wexford
10	Pierce Dooley	Laois	2-03	9	Offaly
10	Charlie McCarthy	Cork	2-03	9	Galway
10	Tony Doran	Wexford	2-03	9	Limerick
10	Paul Lynch	Wexford	1-06	9	Limerick

== Division 2 ==
National Hurling League Division 2
- Season: 1966-67
- Champions: Kerry; 3rd Division 2 title
- All statistics correct as of 3 March 2017.

On 30 April 1967, Kerry won the title after a 4-8 to 3-8 win over Meath in the final. It was their 3rd Division 2 title overall and their first since 1961-62.

=== Division 2A table ===
Pos	Team	Pld	W	D	L	Diff	Notes
1	Meath	4	4	0	0	8	
2	Antrim	4	2	1	1	5	
3	Westmeath	4	2	0	2	4	
4	Roscommon	3	0	1	2	1	
5	Down	3	0	0	3	0	

=== Division 2B table ===
Pos	Team	Pld	W	D	L	Diff	Notes
1	Kerry	3	2	0	1	4	Division 2 champions
2	Carlow	3	2	0	1	4	
3	Wicklow	3	1	0	2	2	
4	Kildare	3	1	0	2	2	

=== Knock-out stage ===
Semi-finals

2 April 1967 Semi-final	Kerry	8-6 - 1-7	Antrim	Croke Park, Dublin
	D Lovett 3-2, T Nolan 2-0, J McGrath 1-1, E O'Sullivan 1-1, J Barry 1-1, T Kenny 0-1.		M Rogan 1-0, P McShane 0-3, W Boylan 0-2, A Campbell 0-1, W Richmond 0-1.

9 April 1967 Semi-final	Meath	3-7 - 1-7	Carlow	Croke Park, Dublin
	M McKelkenny 2-3, W Effie 1-1, T Ennis 0-1, M Ennis 0-1, N McCabe 0-1.		P McNally 1-0, Liam Walsh 0-3, Sean Walsh 0-2, M Morrissey 0-1, W Welsh 0-1.	Referee: C Foley (Dublin)

Final

30 April 1967 Final	Kerry	4-8 - 3-8	Meath	Croke Park, Dublin
	E O'Sullivan 2-1, D Lovett 1-2, P Finnegan 1-1, T McCarthy 0-3, T Kenny 0-1.		J Ryan 1-3, T Ennis 1-2, M McCabe 1-0, M Mullen 0-2, P Christie 0-1.	Referee: J Duggan (Galway)

== Division 3 ==
National Hurling League Division 3
- Season: 1966-67
- Champions: Louth
- Matches: 7
- All statistics correct as of 3 March 2017.

Mayo came into the season as defending champions of the 1965-66 season.

On 1 October 1967, Louth won the title after a 3-5 to 2-4 win over Mayo in the final. It was their first hurling title in any grade.

=== Division 3A table ===
Pos	Team	Pld	W	D	L	Diff	Notes
1	Louth	3	3	0	0	6	Division 3 champions
2	Armagh	3	2	0	1	4	
3	Tyrone	3	1	0	2	2	
4	Monaghan	3	0	0	3	0	

=== Division 3B table ===
Pos	Team	Pld	W	D	L	Diff	Notes
1	Mayo	3	2	0	1	4	
2	Leitrim	3	2	0	1	4	
3	Sligo	3	1	0	2	2	
4	Donegal	3	1	0	2	2	

=== Knock-out stage ===
Final

1 October 1967 Final	Louth	3-5 - 2-4	Mayo	Pearse Park, Longford
	V O'Connor 1-1, A Whelan 1-0, S O'Brien 1-0, P Murphy 0-3, S Kierans 0-2.		M Nolan 1-0, A Moran 1-0, T Henry 0-2, B Crowley 0-1, E Freeman 0-1.
