= Paddy Molloy (hurler) =

Irish hurler (1934–2020)

Personal information
- Native name: Pádraig Ó Maolmhuaidh (Irish)
- Born: 1934 Drumcullen, County Offaly, Ireland
- Died: 6 May 2020 (aged 86) Birr, County Offaly, Ireland

Sport
- Sport: Hurling
- Position: Left corner-forward
Clubs
- Years: Club
- Seir Kieran; Kinnitty; Drumcullen
Club titles
- Offaly titles: 4
Inter-county
| Years | County | Apps (scores) |
| 1955–1971 | Offaly | 25 (25–76) |
Inter-county titles
- Leinster titles: 0
- All-Irelands: 0
- NHL: 0
- All Stars: 0

Patrick Molloy (1934 – 6 May 2020) was an Irish hurler. His career included stints with club sides Drumcullen, Seir Kieran and Kinnitty, while he was also enjoyed a 16-year career with the Offaly senior hurling team.

== Playing career ==
=== Drumcullen ===
Molloy first played for Drumcullen at juvenile level when he was selected on the club's under-14 team at the age of eight. After six years playing in that grade he later lined out with Seir Kieran and Kinnitty before returning to Drumcullen.

After winning an Offaly Minor Championship with Drumcullen as a 15-year-old in 1949, he was later drafted onto the club's junior and senior teams as goalkeeper. He won his first Offaly Senior Championship medal in 1954 when he lined out in goal in Drumcullen's 4-03 to 3-02 defeat of Coolderry in the final.

Drumcullen lost back-to-back finals over the following two years but claimed the title once again in 1957, with Molloy collecting a second winners' medal after the 10-07 to 1-03 victory over Shannon Rovers. He added a third county championship medal to his collection the following year when Drumcullen accounted for Coolderry by 3-09 to 1-04.

Three-in-a-row proved beyond Drumcullen, however, the club reached the 1961 final with Molloy serving as captain of the team. He guided the team to their 17th championship title after the 4-11 to 4-10 victory over Shinrone. Molloy lined out in a further five finals before he brought the curtain down on his 20-year club career after defeat by St. Rynagh's in the 1973 final.

=== Offaly ===
Molloy first played for Offaly as a member of the minor team during the 1952 Leinster Minor Championship. He lined out in goal in the 5-06 to 1-01 defeat by Kilkenny in what was Offaly's only game of the championship.

After lining out with the Offaly junior team during their successful 1953 Leinster Junior Championship campaign, Molloy was drafted onto the Offaly senior team in advance of the 1955 Leinster Championship. He made his debut for the team on 24 April 1955 when he was selected in goal for the 2-11 to 2-03 defeat by Westmeath in the first round.

During the 1955-56 National League, Molloy was relieved of his goalkeeping duties and was installed as the team's first-choice right wing-back. He was later deployed at midfield before first lining out as a forward during the 1963 Leinster Championship. Molloy's move to the forwards proved to be a successful one, as two years later in 1965 he was the championship's top scorer after scoring 4-12 in just two games.

On 24 April 1966, Molloy was selected at right corner-forward when Offaly faced Kerry in the Division 2 final of the 1965–66 National League. He scored five points in the 4-11 to 3-09 victory and secured his only national silverware with Offaly. Molloy ended the season by being named in the right corner-forward position on the 1966 Gaelic Weekly Team of the Year.

Molloy lined out in the only provincial decider of his career when Offaly faced Kilkenny in the 1969 Leinster final. He top-scored for the team with eight points in the 3-09 to 0-16 defeat. Molly also ended the championship as overall top scorer with 8-18.

Molloy played his last game for Offaly in a 2-14 to 2-06 defeat by Wexford in the 1971 Leinster Championship. At the time of his retirement from inter-county hurling he was the third highest scorer in Leinster Championship history behind Eddie Keher and Nicky Rackard.

=== Leinster ===
Molloy's performances for Offaly led to his inclusion on the Leinster inter-provincial team. He was listed amongst the substitutes during the 1962 Railway Cup and claimed his first winners' medal as a non-playing substitute on 17 March 1962 after Leinster's 1-11 to 1-09 defeat of Munster in the final.

After being omitted from the team on a number of occasions, Molloy was included on the starting fifteen as left wing-back during the 1965 Railway Cup. He collected a second winners' medal - his first on the field of play - after Leinster's 3-11 to 0-09 final victory over Munster. After defeat in 1966, Molloy claimed his third winners' medal in 1967 after a 2-14 to 3-05 victory over Munster once again.

== Death ==
Molloy died aged 86 on 6 May 2020.

== Honours ==
Drumcullen

- Offaly Senior Hurling Championship (4): 1954, 1957, 1958, 1960 (c)
- Offaly Minor Hurling Championship (1): 1949

Offaly

- National League Division 2 (1): 1965-66
- Leinster Junior Hurling Championship (1): 1953

Leinster

- Railway Cup (3): 1962, 1965, 1967

Awards

- Gaelic Weekly All-Stars (1): 1966
