= 1968 Railway Cup Hurling Championship =

Irish hurling competition

- Dates: 25 February 1968 - 17 March 1968
- Teams: 4
- Champions: Munster (29th title); Mick Roche (captain)
- Runners-up: Leinster

Tournament statistics
- Matches played: 3
- Goals scored: 12 (4 per match)
- Points scored: 62 (20.67 per match)
- Top scorer(s): Justin McCarthy (2-06)

The 1968 Railway Cup Hurling Championship was the 42nd staging of the Railway Cup since its establishment by the Gaelic Athletic Association in 1927. The cup began on 25 February 1968 ended on 17 March 1968.

Leinster were the defending champions.

On 17 March 1968, Munster won the cup following a 0-14 to 0-10 defeat of Leinster in the final. This was their 29th Railway Cup title and their first since 1966.

Munster's Justin McCarthy was the top scorer with 2-06.

== Results ==
Semi-finals

| 25 February 1968 Semi-final | Munster | 3-15 - 1-05 | Connacht | Thurles Sportsfield, Thurles |
| | J McCarthy 2-4, D Nealon 1-5, É Cregan 0-2, L Guinan 0-2, M Roche 0-1, P Cronin 0-1. | | | Referee: P Johnston (Kilkenny) |

| 25 February 1968 Semi-final | Leinster | 5-10 - 3-08 | Ulster | Páirc Tailteann, Navan |
| | T Ring 1-3, J O'Brien 1-2, E Keher 1-2, T Doran 1-1, P Molloy 1-1, P Moran 0-1. | | M Stafford 1-1, B McGarry 1-1, E Donnelly 1-1, P Branniff 0-2, P McShane 0-2, E Falcoona 0-1. | Referee: C Foley (Dublin) |

Final

| 17 March 1968 Final | Munster | 0-14 - 0-10 | Leinster | Croke Park, Dublin |
| | M Roche 0-4, S Barry 0-3, J McCarthy 0-2, B Hartigan 0-1, G McCarthy 0-1, L Guinan 0-1, D Nealon 0-1, M Keating 0-1. | | P Moran 0-2, E Keher 0-2, C Dunne 0-2, N Cleere 0-2, P Molloy 0-1, D Quigley 0-1. | Referee: A Higgins (Galway) |

== Scoring statistics ==
Top scorers overall

| Rank | Player | Club | Tally | Total | Matches | Average |
|---|---|---|---|---|---|---|
| 1 | Justin McCarthy | Munster | 2-06 | 12 | 2 | 6.00 |

Top scorers in a single game

| Rank | Player | Club | Tally | Total | Opposition |
|---|---|---|---|---|---|
| 1 | Justin McCarthy | Munster | 2-04 | 10 | Connacht |
| 2 | Donie Nealon | Munster | 1-05 | 8 | Connacht |
| 3 | Tommy Ring | Leinster | 1-03 | 6 | Ulster |
| 4 | Jimmy O'Brien | Leinster | 1-02 | 5 | Ulster |
| 4 | Eddie Keher | Leinster | 1-02 | 5 | Ulster |

== Bibliography ==
- Donegan, Des, The Complete Handbook of Gaelic Games (DBA Publications Limited, 2005).
