= Jimmy Doyle (hurler) =

Irish hurler

Personal information
- Native name: Séamus Ó Dúil (Irish)
- Born: 20 March 1939 Thurles, County Tipperary, Ireland
- Died: 22 June 2015 (aged 76) Thurles, County Tipperary, Ireland
- Height: 5 ft 7 in (170 cm)

Sport
- Sport: Hurling
- Position: Right wing-forward
Club
- Years: Club
- 1956–1975: Thurles Sarsfield's
Club titles
	Football	Hurling
Tipperary titles	1	10
Inter-county*
Years	County	Apps (scores)
1957–1973	Tipperary	39 (18–176)
Inter-county titles
- Munster titles: 9
- All-Irelands: 6
- NHL: 7
- *Inter County team apps and scores correct as of 21:05, 9 August 2013.

James Doyle (20 March 1939 – 22 June 2015) was an Irish hurler who played as a right wing-forward for the Tipperary senior team.

Born in Thurles, County Tipperary, Doyle first played competitive hurling whilst at school in Thurles CBS. He arrived on the inter-county scene at the age of fourteen when he first linked up with the Tipperary minor team. He made his senior debut in the 1957–58 National League. Doyle went on to play a key part for Tipperary during a hugely successful era for the team, and won six All-Ireland medals, nine Munster medals and seven National Hurling League medals. An All-Ireland runner-up on three occasions, Doyle also captained the team to All-Ireland victory in 1962 and 1965.

As a member of the Munster inter-provincial team for twelve years, Doyle won eight Railway Cup medals. At club level, he won ten championship medals with Thurles Sarsfield's.

At the time of his retirement Doyle's career tally of 18 goals and 176 points ranked him as Tipperary's all-time top scorer. It was a record which stood until 24 June 2007 when it was surpassed by Eoin Kelly.

His father, Gerry, his uncle, Tommy, and his brother, Paddy Doyle, also enjoyed All-Ireland success with Tipperary.

Throughout his career, Doyle made 39 championship appearances. His retirement came following Tipperary's defeat by Limerick in the 1973 championship.

In retirement from playing Doyle became involved in team management and coaching. At club level, he guided Portlaoise to championship success before later taking charge of the Laois senior team.

Doyle is widely regarded as one of the greatest hurlers in the history of the game. During his playing days, he won three Cú Chulainn awards, as well as being named Texaco Hurler of the Year in 1965. He has been repeatedly voted onto teams made up of the sport's greats, including at right corner-forward on the Hurling Team of the Century in 1984 and at left corner-forward on the Hurling Team of the Millennium in 2000.

== Playing career ==
=== College ===
Doyle attended Thurles CBS and enjoyed some success.

In 1956 he played a key part for the college in the provincial championship. A 2–5 to 2–3 defeat of the North Monastery, Cork gave Doyle a Harty Cup medal.

=== Club ===
Doyle played his club hurling with Thurles Sarsfield's and enjoyed much success in a career that spanned three decades.

He first came to prominence as a member of the club's minor hurling team, winning four championship medals in a row between 1954 and 1957.

By 1956 Doyle, as a sixteen-year-old, joined the Thurles Sarsfield's senior team. It was a successful debut season, as he won his first championship medal following a 3–8 to 1–4 defeat of Lorrha. It was a hugely successful era for Doyle and Sarsfield's, as he added further championship medals to his collection in 1957, following a 4–14 to 4–4 defeat of southern "combo" Na Piarsaigh, and in 1958 as Toomevara were downed by 4–11 to 3–3.

Doyle won a fourth successive championship medal in 1959 as Kilruane MacDonagh's were defeated by 3–12 to 2–6, in spite of both teams being on level terms with just ten minutes remaining.

Thurles Sarfield's great run of success came to an end in 1960, however, in spite of facing defeat on the furling field, Doyle won a championship medal with the Thurles Croke's football team following their defeat of Clonmel Commercials.

While many thought that Thurles Sarsfield's were now in decline as a hurling power, the team bounced back in 1961. A 3–4 to 0–9 defeat of Toomevara gave Doyle his fifth championship medal. It was the beginning of another glorious era for the team, as further defeats of Moycarkey-Borris in 1962, Roscrea in 1963 and Holycross-Ballycahill in 1964 brought Doyle's championship medal tally to eight.

In 1965 Doyle's side had the chance to make history by winning a record-equalling fifth successive championship. Carrick Davins provided the opposition and took Sarsfield's to a replay. A 3–11 to 2–7 victory at the second time of asking gave Doyle a ninth championship medal.

Almost a decade passed before Doyle, who by now was captain of the team, enjoyed one final success. A 3–6 to 1–10 defeat of Silvermines gave him a remarkable tenth championship medal.

=== Minor ===
Doyle was just fifteen years old when he made his debut the Tipperary minor hurling team as a goalkeeper on 20 June 1954 in a 6-5 to 0-1 Munster semi-final defeat of Clare. Later that year he collected his first Munster medal following a 3–5 to 2–3 defeat of Limerick Limerick. The subsequent All-Ireland final on 5 September 1954 saw Dublin provide the opposition, however, Tipperary were defeated by 2–7 to 2–3.

It was after this defeat that Doyle hinted that he wanted to be moved from the position of goalkeeper to a more favoured position in the forward line. His wish was granted and he won a second consecutive Munster medal in 1955 following an 8–11 to 2–5 trouncing of Waterford. Doyle later appeared in a second All-Ireland final on 4 September 1955 with Galway providing the opposition. His move to the forward line was a worthwhile venture as he scored a remarkable 2–8. Tipperary won the game by 5–15 to 2–5 giving Doyle an All-Ireland Minor Hurling Championship medal.

In 1956 Doyle collected a third successive Munster medal as Waterford were downed once again on a 10–10 to 4–4 score line. On 23 September 1956 Tipperary faced Kilkenny in the All-Ireland final. A 4–16 to 1–5 trouncing, with Doyle contributing 2-3, secured his second successive All-Ireland medal.

Doyle was appointed captain of the Tipperary minor team in 1957, in what was his last year in the grade. A 3–8 to 1–4 defeat of Limerick gave him a record fourth successive Munster medal. For the second year in a row, Kilkenny provided the opposition in the All-Ireland final. In a close game, Tipperary eventually triumphed by 4–7 to 3–7. The victory gave Doyle a record-breaking third successive All-Ireland medal as well as the honour of accepting the cup

=== Senior ===
==== First victories ====
Doyle was still in the minor grade when he joined the Tipperary senior team for the 1956–57 National Hurling League. It was a successful campaign as Doyle collected a National Hurling League medal following a 3–11 to 2–7 defeat of Kilkenny in the decider. He made his senior championship debut, while still captain of the minor team, in a 5-2 to 1-11 Munster semi-final defeat by Cork on 30 June 1957.

In 1958 Doyle won his first Munster medal as Tipperary regained the provincial crown following a 4–12 to 1–5 trouncing of reigning champions Waterford. Tipperary later defeated Kilkenny in the All-Ireland semi-final, with Doyle giving a master class by scoring 1-8, before lining out against Galway in the All-Ireland decider on 7 September 1958. Galway got a bye into the final without picking up a hurley. Liam Devaney, Donie Nealon and Larry Keane all scored goals for Tipperary in the first-half, while Tony Wall sent a seventy-yard free untouched to the Galway net. Tipperary won the game by 4–9 to 2–5 giving Doyle his first All-Ireland medal. He also ended the championship as the top scorer with 2–23.

Doyle won a second National League medal in 1959 following a 0–15 to 0–7 defeat of Waterford, however, Tipperary subsequently surrendered their provincial and All-Ireland crowns in remarkable fashion to the same opposition.

Tipperary asserted their dominance in 1960 by retaining the National League title with a 2–15 to 3–8 defeat of Cork. It was Doyle's third winners' medal in that competition. He later won a second Munster medal, contributing 1–8, following a narrow 4–13 to 4–11 defeat of Cork in what has been described as the toughest game of hurling ever played. This victory allowed Tipperary to advance directly to an All-Ireland final meeting with Wexford on 4 September 1960. A certain amount of over-confidence was obvious in the Tipperary camp, particularly in trainer Phil Purcell's comment that no player was capable of marking Jimmy Doyle. The game ended in remarkable circumstances as the crowd invaded the pitch with a minute to go, mistaking the referee's whistle for the end of the game. When the crowd were finally moved off the pitch Tipperary continued playing with only twelve men, but Wexford won on a score line of 2–15 to 0–11. It was Doyle's first All-Ireland defeat, however, he still ended the season as the championship's top scorer. He later won his first Oireachtas medal following a 4-11 to 2-10 defeat of old rivals Cork in the decider.

==== Total dominance ====
1961 saw Doyle collect a fourth National League medal following a 6–6 to 4–9 defeat of Waterford. He later added a third Munster medal to his collection, as Cork were downed once again by 3–6 to 0–7. The game was not without incident as Doyle's ankle was broken following a wild stroke from Jimmy Brohan. He was an immediate doubt for the All-Ireland final as the ankle was reluctantly put in plaster. Doyle walked several miles every evening to strengthen the broken bone, however, when the plaster was removed the ankle was still badly discoloured and swollen. On the Wednesday prior to the All-Ireland final, he failed a fitness test and was a doubt for the game. On 3 September 1961, Dublin provided the opposition in the All-Ireland decider and Doyle was named in the starting fifteen. Prior to the match, he received two injections on either side of his ankle that deadened the leg from his toes to his knee. The treatment was risky as Doyle would have no way of knowing if his ankle broke. He received two more injections at half time, however, towards the end of the game his ankle did give way but he couldn't be replaced as Tipperary had used all of their substitutes. The game itself was a close run thing, however, Tipperary held on to win by 0–16 to 1–12. It was Doyle's second All-Ireland medal, while he finished the championship as top scorer once again. He later won a second successive Oireachtas medal following a 2-13 to 3-4 defeat of Wexford in a replay.

In 1962 Tipperary were still the kingpins of Munster as Doyle was appointed captain of the team. A 5–14 to 2–3 trouncing of Waterford in the decider gave him a fourth Munster medal. Tipperary's nemesis of two years earlier, Wexford, waited in Croke Park to test them once again in the subsequent All-Ireland final on 2 September 1962. Wexford, however, were not the force of old and the side got off to possibly the worst start ever by a team in a championship decider. After just ninety seconds the Leinster champions were down by two goals, however, the game turned out to be much closer than people expected. Tipperary eventually secured the win on a score line of 3–10 to 2–11, however, Doyle had to be stretchered off the field with a fractured collarbone. As a result of this he was denied the opportunity of collecting the Liam MacCarthy Cup. For the third year in-a-row he ended the campaign as the championship's top scorer.

In spite of being denied by Waterford in their quest for a third successive All-Ireland title, Doyle won a third Oireachtas medal in 1963 following a 4-15 to 3-12 defeat of Wexford. His performances throughout the year also earned him a Cú Chulainn award.

Tipperary bounced back in 1964 with Doyle collecting a fifth National League medal following a 4-16 to 6-6 defeat of New York. The team subsequently cantered past Cork by fourteen points in the provincial decider, giving Doyle a fifth Munster medal. The All-Ireland final on 6 September 1964 saw Kilkenny enter the game as firm favourites against Doyle's side. John "Mackey" McKenna scored Tipperary's first goal after ten minutes as the Munster champions took a 1–8 to 0–6 interval lead. The second half saw Tipperary score goals for fun, with Donie Nealon getting a hat-trick and Seán McLoughlin another. Kilkenny were humiliated at the full-time whistle as Tipperary triumphed by 5–13 to 2–8. It was Doyle's fourth All-Ireland medal while, once again, he finished as the championship's top scorer. He later won a fourth Oireachtas medal as Kilkenny were narrowly defeated by 5-7 to 4-8 in the decider before winning a second Cú Chulainn award.

In 1965 Doyle was Tipperary captain for a second time as the team demolished all opposition in the provincial championship once again. A 4–11 to 0–5 trouncing of Cork gave Doyle a sixth Munster medal. Wexford were Tipperary's opponents in the subsequent All-Ireland final on 5 September 1965, however, the game failed to live up to the two classic games between the two sides in 1960 and 1962. Victory went to Tipperary on that occasion by 2–16 to 0–10, courtesy of a brace of goals by Seán McLoughlin. The win gave Doyle a fifth All-Ireland medal, while he also had the honour of lifting the Liam MacCarthy Cup having been injured on his previous occasion as captain. The year ended with further success as he won a sixth National League medal as New York were narrowly defeated on an aggregate score of 6–19 to 5–20 before claiming a fifth Oireachtas medal as Kilkenny were downed by 2-12 to 2-7. Doyle's performances throughout the year also earned him a third successive Cú Chulainn award and the Texaco Hurler of the Year award.

==== Decline ====
After surrendering their provincial crown in 1966, Tipperary bounced back the following year, with Doyle winning a seventh Munster medal following a 4–12 to 2–6 defeat of Clare. On 3 September 1967, Kilkenny faced Tipperary in the All-Ireland decider. Tipperary looked like continuing their hoodoo over their near rivals as they took a 2–6 to 1–3 lead at half-time. Goalkeeper Ollie Walsh was the hero for Kilkenny as he made a series of spectacular saves, however, the team lost Eddie Keher and Tom Walsh to injury in the second half. In spite of this, Kilkenny laid to rest a bogey that Tipperary had over the team since 1922, and a 3–8 to 2–7 victory resulted in defeat for Doyle's team.

Doyle won a seventh National League medal in 1968 as New York were defeated on an aggregate score of 6–27 to 4–22. Tipperary retained their status as provincial kingpins once again and a 2–13 to 1–7 trouncing of Cork gave Doyle an eighth Munster medal. For the fourth time of the decade, Wexford were Tipperary's opponents in the subsequent All-Ireland final on 1 September 1968. At half-time, it looked as if Tipperary were cruising to another victory as they took an eight-point lead. Just after the restart, Wexford had a Christy Jacob goal disallowed before Tony Doran scored a goal after just six minutes. Tipperary fought back, however, it was too late as Wexford won by 5–8 to 3–12. In spite of this setback, Doyle finished the year with a sixth oireachtas medal following a narrow 1-9 to 1-6 defeat of Cork.

In 1970 Doyle won a seventh and final Oireachtas medal following a 1-12 to 0-8 defeat of recently crowned All-Ireland champions Cork in the final.

==== Last hurrah ====
By 1971 Doyle's career was drawing to a close. The back trouble that had dogged him throughout his life was taking its toll. Doyle lost his place on the starting fifteen for the start of the championship, however, he was back on the team for the Munster decider against Limerick. A 4–16 to 3–18 victory gave him a ninth Munster medal. On 5 September 1971, Kilkenny faced Tipperary in the All-Ireland final, the first to be broadcast in colour by Telefís Éireann and the only eighty-minute meeting between the two sides. Doyle started the game on the bench. Kilkenny's ever-dependable goalkeeper, Ollie Walsh, had a nightmare of a game in which he conceded five goals, one of which passed through his legs, while that year's Hurler of the Year, "Babs" Keating, played out the closing stages of the game in his bare feet. Doyle came on as a substitute for Séamus Hogan for the last ten minutes as Tipperary emerged the victors on a score line of 5–17 to 5–14. It was his sixth All-Ireland medal, making him one of only a handful of players to have claimed winners' medals in three separate decades.

Doyle continued to play for Tipperary for the next two years but time was now running out. Broken fingers, ankles, knuckles, collar bones and premature arthritis meant that he was no longer able to command an automatic place on the team.

In 1973 the regular Tipperary goalkeeper, Tadhg Murphy, was forced to emigrate to England. With no other goalkeeper available Doyle was asked to play in goal. Although reluctant he lined out between the posts in the respective Munster quarter and semi-final victories over Waterford and Cork. Murphy returned for the Munster final against Limerick and Doyle was dropped to the substitutes' bench. Tipperary lost the game and Doyle retired from inter-county hurling shortly afterwards.

=== Inter-provincial ===
Doyle was first picked for the Munster inter-provincial team in 1958. Doyle was at left wing-forward, with his boyhood her Christy Ring at full-forward, for the inter-provincial decider against arch-rivals Leinster. A narrow 3-7 to 3-5 victory gave Doyle his first Railway Cup medal. It was a hugely successful era for the southern province as subsequent defeats of Connacht in 1959 and Leinster in 1960 and 1961 secured four successive Railway Cup medals for Doyle.

In 1962 Doyle was captain of the team as his bid for a fifth successive winners' medal faltered with a 1-11 to 1-9 defeat by Leinster. He retained the captaincy the following year, however, the final with Leinster ended with a 5-5 apiece draw. The replay was also a close affair, however, Munster triumphed by 2-8 to 2-7. Not only did Doyle collect a fifth Railway Cup medal but he also had the honour of lifting the cup.

Defeat was Munster's lot over the next two years, however, Doyle was restored to the captaincy once again in 1966. Another narrow 3-13 to 3-11 defeat of Leinster secured his sixth Railway Cup medal and his second as captain of the side.

After being dropped from the starting fifteen in 1967 and dropped altogether from the team in 1968, Doyle was back at right corner-forward in 1969. Munster faced a scare in the decider that year as Connacht secured a 2-9 apiece draw. The replay was more conclusive with Doyle winning a seventh Railway Cup medal following a 3-13 to 4-4 victory.

Doyle was now in the twilight of his career, however, he was picked for the Munster team for the twelfth time in thirteen years in 1970. A 2-15 to 0-9 trouncing of old rivals Leinster secured his eighth Railway Cup medal.

== Coaching career ==
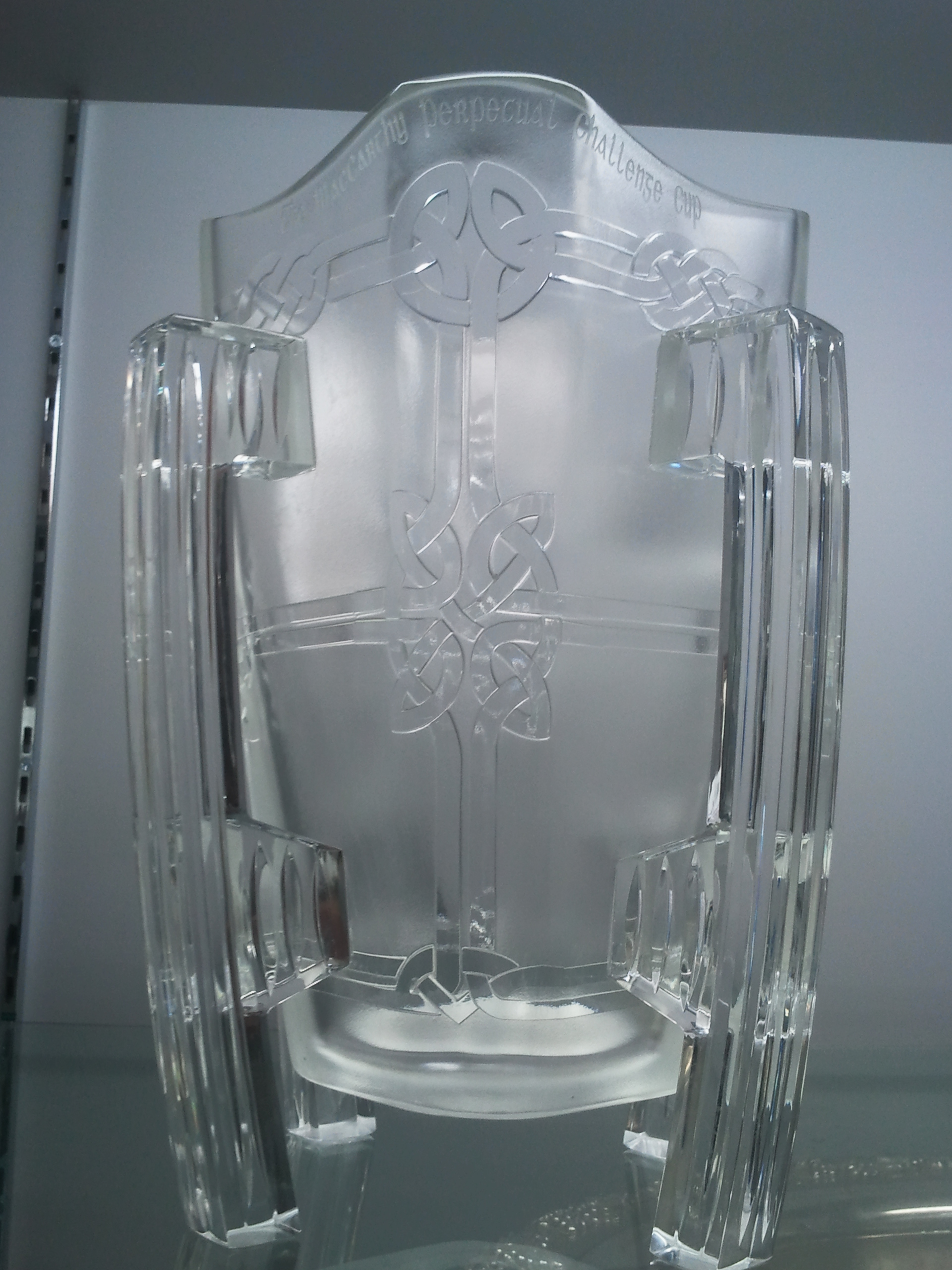
Replica of the Liam MacCarthy Cup, presented to Jimmy Doyle by Ballygarvan GAA (home of the parents of Liam MacCarthy) in 2004.

=== Portlaoise ===
In 1980 Doyle took over as coach of the Portlaoise senior team with Tom Lalor and guided the team to the championship decider. A 3-4 to 1-8 defeat by Camross was the result on that occasion.

Both Portlaoise and Camross met in the decider once again in 1981. A narrow 2-13 to 4-5 victory for Portlaoise gave Doyle his first success as coach with the club. It was the first of four successive championships for Portlaoise as subsequent defeats of Errill in 1982, Camross in 1983 and Harps in 1984 secured the four-in-a-row.

Five-in-a-row proved beyond Portlaoise who were defeated by old rivals Camross in the 1985 final on a score line of 1-5 to 0-7.

=== Laois ===
In October 1985 Doyle was appointed coach of the Laois senior hurling team. His first season in charge saw Laois lose all but one of their league games before being relegated. In the subsequent Leinster Championship, Laois had a convincing win over Westmeath in their opening game before succumbing to All-Ireland champions Offaly on a score line of 1-23 to 4-9 in the provincial semi-final.

Laois made some progress in Division 2 of the league during 1986-87, including a defeat of Doyle's native county Tipperary at Semple Stadium, however, they failed to gain promotion to the top tier. The subsequent championship campaign ended at the provincial semi-final stage, once again at the hands of Offaly.

Doyle's side failed to claim any major victories during the 1987-88 league campaign, while Laois's interest in the championship ended with a 3-10 to 1-8 quarter-final defeat by Wexford.

== Recognition ==
A decade after his retirement, Doyle received the ultimate honour during the GAA's centenary year in 1984 when he was chosen at right corner-forward on the Hurling Team of the Century. He was later switched to left corner-forward on the Hurling Team of the Millennium in 2000, before being named at right wing-forward on the Tipperary Hurling Team of the Century and at centre-forward on the Munster Hurling Team of the Millennium.

On 13 March 2008 Doyle was profiled on the TG4 television programme Laochra Gael.

As part of the GAA 125 celebrations in 2009, Doyle was chosen as the Tipperary representative to be part of a commemorative torch parade through Thurles on the day of the Munster final. As a native of the town, Doyle had the honour of carrying the torch into Semple Stadium where it was presented to the chairman of the Munster Council.

In April 2012 the Jimmy Doyle Road was named in his honour. The road links the Nenagh road and the Templemore road.

Following his death in June 2015, tributes poured in from across the hurling world. Former teammate Michael "Babs" Keating recalled a conversation with Doyle's boyhood hero Christy Ring: "I suppose the best tribute I could pay him was when I was having lunch with Ring in 1966 or ‘67 in Mallow and in those days all the talk was about hurling no matter who came to the table. He was putting me under pressure about who was the best ever but as we walked out Ring said, "Babs, if Jimmy Doyle was as strong as you and I nobody would ever ask who was the best". Probably the greatest compliment that was ever paid to any hurler."

Contemporary Kilkenny hurler, Eddie Keher, said: "He was brilliant. I was always a great fan of his even though we were great rivals. Jimmy was also a gentleman both on and off the field and such a beautiful striker of the ball."

Former teammate Len Gaynor said: "Jimmy was a master of his craft, that was for sure. He was one of the best hurlers ever, unbelievably skilful, a terrific forward. You are talking about Ring, Mackey, Doyle, Eddie Keher – he's in those four right up there."

Legendary Gaelic games commentator Micheál Ó Muircheartaigh said: "He's ranked among the very, very best ever and proof of that was, he was on the Team of the Millennium, the Team of the Century. He was unique."

== Personal life ==
Born in Thurles, County Tipperary, Doyle was one of six children. His father, Gerry Doyle, a cobbler by trade, had been the substitute goalkeeper on the Tipperary team that won the 1937 and 1945 All-Ireland titles. His uncle, Tommy Doyle, won five All-Ireland medals with Tipperary between 1937 and 1951.

Doyle was educated locally at Thurles CBS, however, he had few academic leanings and virtually no interest in school. His mother would do his homework for him while Doyle practised his hurling skills with his sheepdog Pal in the shadow of the famous Thurles Sportsfield. It was with his dog that Doyle learned the basic skills of hurling and, in particular, the need to control the sliotar.

After his schooling, Doyle worked as a cobbler with his father before working at the Assumption Hospital in Thurles.

Doyle died unexpectedly at his home in Thurles on 22 June 2015.

== Career statistics ==
=== Inter-county ===
Team	Year	National League			Munster		All-Ireland		Total	
Team	Year	Division	Apps	Score	Apps	Score	Apps	Score	Apps	Score
Tipperary	1956-57	Division 1B	2	0-06	1	0-02	—		3	0-08
Tipperary	1957-58	Division 1B	3	1-15	3	1-12	2	1-11	8	3-38
Tipperary	1958-59	Division 1B	3	1-14	2	1-03	—		5	2-17
Tipperary	1959-60	Division 1B	5	5-26	3	5-17	1	0-01	9	10-44
Tipperary	1960-61	Division 1B	3	2-04	2	2-08	1	0-09	6	4-21
Tipperary	1961-62	Division 1B	2	3-02	3	4-20	1	0-04	6	7-26
Tipperary	1962-63	Division 1B	3	2-11	2	0-07	—		5	2-18
Tipperary	1963-64	Division 1A	7	8-35	2	1-17	1	0-10	10	9-62
Tipperary	1964-65	Division 1A	8	7-42	2	0-08	1	0-06	11	7-56
Tipperary	1965-66	Division 1A	5	4-20	1	0-01	—		6	4-21
Tipperary	1966-67	Division 1A	1	0-06	0	0-00	1	0-05	2	0-11
Tipperary	1967-68	Division 1A	9	4-50	2	0-12	1	1-05	12	5-67
Tipperary	1968-69	Division 1A	5	2-27	3	1-18	—		8	3-45
Tipperary	1969-70	Division 1A	6	3-26	0	0-00	—		6	3-26
Tipperary	1970-71	Division 1A	8	3-31	1	0-01	1	0-00	10	3-32
Tipperary	1971-72	Division 1A	0	0-00	0	0-00	—		0	0-00
Tipperary	1972-73	Division 1A	1	0-00	1	0-00	—		2	0-00
Total			71	45-315	28	15-126	10	2-51	119	62-492

=== Inter-provincial ===
Team	Year	Railway Cup	
Team	Year	Apps	Score
Munster	1958	2	1-03
Munster	1959	1	0-02
Munster	1960	2	2-02
Munster	1961	2	2-10
Munster	1962	2	1-07
Munster	1963	3	4-09
Munster	1964	2	1-05
Munster	1965	2	0-07
Munster	1966	2	2-05
Munster	1967	0	0-00
Munster	1968	—	
Munster	1969	2	1-12
Munster	1970	2	1-10
Total		22	15-72

== Honours ==
=== Player ===
Thurles CBS

- Harty Cup: 1956

Thurles Sarsfield's

- Tipperary Senior Hurling Championship (10): 1956, 1957, 1958, 1959, 1961, 1962, 1963, 1964 (c), 1965, 1974 (c)
- Mid Tipperary Senior Hurling Championship (13): 1956, 1957, 1958, 1959, 1960, 1961, 1962, 1963, 1964 (c), 1968, 1969, 1973, 1974 (c)
- Tipperary Junior A Hurling Championship (2): 1955, 1956
- Tipperary Minor Hurling Championship (4): 1954, 1955, 1956, 1957

Thurles Croke's

- Tipperary Senior Football Championship (1): 1960

Tipperary

- All-Ireland Senior Hurling Championship (6): 1958, 1961, 1962 (c), 1964, 1965 (c), 1971,
- Munster Senior Hurling Championship (9): 1958, 1960, 1961, 1962 (c), 1964, 1965 (c), 1967, 1968, 1971
- National Hurling League (7): 1956–57, 1958–59, 1959–60, 1960–61, 1963–64, 1964–65, 1967-68
- Oireachtas Cup (7): 1960, 1961, 1963, 1964, 1965, 1968, 1970
- All-Ireland Minor Hurling Championship (3): 1955, 1956, 1957 (c)
- Munster Minor Hurling Championship (4): 1954, 1955, 1956, 1957

Munster

- Railway Cup (8): 1958, 1959, 1960, 1961, 1963 (c), 1966 (c), 1969, 1970

=== Coach ===
Portlaoise

- Laois Senior Hurling Championship (4): 1981, 1982, 1983, 1984

=== Individual ===
Honours

- Hurling Team of the Millennium: Left corner-forward
- Hurling Team of the Century: Right corner-forward
- Munster Hurling Team of the Millennium: Right wing-forward
- Tipperary Hurling Team of the Century: Right wing-forward
- The 125 greatest stars of the GAA: No. 3
- Texaco Hurler of the Year: 1965
- Cú Chulainn Awards (3): 1963, 1964, 1965
- GAA Hall of Fame Inductee: 2013

Sporting positions
Preceded by Matt Hassett	Tipperary Senior Hurling Captain; 1962	Succeeded by Seán McLoughlin
Preceded by Mick Murphy	Tipperary Senior Hurling Captain; 1965	Succeeded by Tony Wall
Preceded by Georgie Leahy	Laois Senior Hurling Manager; 1985–1987	Succeeded by
Achievements
Preceded by Pat Ryan (Tipperary)	All-Ireland Minor Hurling Final winning captain 1957	Succeeded by Paddy Cobbe (Limerick)
Preceded by Matt Hassett (Tipperary)	All-Ireland Senior Hurling Final winning captain 1962	Succeeded by Séamus Cleere (Kilkenny)
Preceded by Noel Drumgoole (Leinster)	Railway Cup Hurling Final winning captain 1963	Succeeded by Séamus Cleere (Leinster)
Preceded by Mick Murphy (Tipperary)	All-Ireland Senior Hurling Final winning captain 1965	Succeeded by Gerald McCarthy (Cork)
Preceded by Paddy Moran (Leinster)	Railway Cup Hurling Final winning captain 1966	Succeeded by Ollie Walsh (Leinster)
Awards
Preceded by John Doyle (Tipperary)	Texaco Hurler of the Year; 1965	Succeeded by Justin McCarthy (Cork)
