= 1965–66 National Hurling League =

35th season of the National Hurling League

League details
- Dates: 3 October 1965 – 9 October 1966

League champions
- Winners: Kilkenny (3rd win)

Other division winners
- Division 2: Offaly
- Division 3: Mayo

The 1965–66 National Hurling League was the 35th season of the National Hurling League.

== Division 1 ==
National Hurling League Division 1
- Season: 1965-66
- Champions: Kilkenny; 3rd National League title Captain: Jim Lynch
- Matches played: 26
- Top goalscorer: Jimmy Doyle (4-20)
- Biggest home win: Tipperary 6-10 - 1-5 Laois (7 November 1965)
- Biggest away win: Galway 3-3 - 8-14 Limerick (28 November 1965)
- Highest scoring: Galway 3-3 - 8-14 Limerick (28 November 1965)
- All statistics correct as of 20 February 2017.

Tipperary came into the season as defending champions of the 1964-65 season. Laois joined Division 1 as the promoted team.

On 18 September 1966, Kilkenny won the title after a 10-15 to 2-15 aggregate win over New York in the final. It was their 3rd league title overall and their first since 1961-62.

In spite of finishing at the bottom of their respective groups, neither Galway of Laois were relegated.

Tipperary's Jimmy Doyle was the Division 1 top scorer with 4-20.

=== Division 1A table ===
| Pos | Team | Pld | W | D | L | Diff | Pts | Notes |
|---|---|---|---|---|---|---|---|---|
| 1 | Tipperary | 4 | 4 | 0 | 0 | 52 | 8 | |
| 2 | Kilkenny | 4 | 3 | 0 | 1 | 1 | 6 | Division 1 champions |
| 3 | Wexford | 4 | 2 | 0 | 2 | -1 | 4 | |
| 4 | Waterford | 4 | 1 | 0 | 3 | -17 | 2 | |
| 5 | Laois | 4 | 0 | 0 | 4 | -35 | 0 | |

=== Group stage ===
| 3 October 1965 | Kilkenny | 3-11 - 1-9 | Waterford | Nowlan Park, Kilkenny |
| | C Dunne 1-3, T Walsh 1-2, J Bennett 1-0, A Comerford 0-3, P Moran 0-2, S Buckley 0-1. | | M Óg Morrissey 1-3, T Cheasty 0-3, J O'Brien 0-2, J Kirwan 0-1. | Referee: T Foran (Tipperary) |

| 3 October 1965 | Wexford | 2-15 - 4-3 | Laois | Enniscorthy |
| | J O'Brien 0-5, C Dowdall 1-1, P Wilson 1-0, V Staples 0-2, W Murphy 0-2, T Dunne 0-2, L Butler 0-1, T Butler 0-1, Ml Byrne 0-1. | | Son Cashin 1-0, P Dooley 1-0, O Fennell 1-0, C O'Brien 1-0, G Rankin 0-1, M Murphy 0-1, P Delaney 0-1. | Referee: J Hatton (Wicklow) |

| 24 October 1965 | Waterford | 2-7 - 5-9 | Tipperary | Fraher Field, Dungarvan |
| | M Murphy 1-1, T Cheasty 0-4, J O'Donnell 1-0, P McGovern 0-2. | | S McLoughlin 3-0, Jimmy Doyle 2-5, L Kiely 0-2, J McKenna 0-1, M Keating 0-1. | Referee: P BUggy (Kilkenny) |

| 24 October 1965 | Laois | 3-10 - 5-6 | Kilkenny | O'Moore Park, Portlaoise |
| | J Conroy 2-5, M Murphy 1-0, S Cashin 0-2, G Rankin 0-1, J Houlihan 0-1, C O'Brien 0-1. | | T Walsh 1-2, K Purcell 1-1, P Carroll 1-0, J Teehan 1-0, P Dillon 1-0, D Heaslip 1-0. |

| 7 November 1965 | Kilkenny | 2-12 - 2-9 | Wexford | Nowlan Park, Kilkenny |
| | E Keher 1-7, P Dillon 1-1, T Walsh 0-2, J Teehan 0-1, C Dunne 0-1. | | D Shannon 0-4, T Dunne 1-0, P Wilson 1-0, W Murphy 0-1, C Dowdall 0-1, T Doran 0-1, O McGrath 0-1, P Donoghue 0-1. |

| 7 November 1965 | Tipperary | 6-10 - 1-5 | Laois | St. Cronan's Park, Roscrea |
| | M Keating 3-0, S Mackey 2-1, D Nealon 1-4, L Kiely 0-3, P Doyle 0-2. | | C O'Brien 1-1, G Rankin 0-2, P Delaney 0-1. |

| 13 February 1966 | Laois | 3-3 - 3-10 | Waterford | Abbeyleix |
| | P Dooley 1-0, J Conroy 1-0, M Kelly 1-0, J Houlihan 0-1, G Rankins 0-1, J Lyons 0-1. | | T Cheasty 1-3, J Kirwan 1-2, F Walsh 1-2, P McGovern 0-3. | Referee: P Ryan (Tipperary) |

| 13 February 1966 | Wexford | 2-8 - 3-11 | Tipperary | O'Kennedy Park, New Ross |
| | D Shannon 0-4, C Dowdall 1-0, J O'Brien 0-2, L Butler 0-1, S O'Leary 0-1. | | Jimmy Doyle 1-4, M Keating 0-5, D Nealon 1-0, J McKenna 1-0, T English 0-1, M Roche 0-1. | Referee: C Foley (Dublin) |

| 13 March 1966 | Waterford | 1-11 - 4-7 | Wexford | Páirc Uí Bhriain, Dunhill |
| | T Cheasty 0-6, J Warren 1-1, J Kirwan 0-2, P McGovern 0-1, F Walsh 0-1. | | P O'Donoghue 2-1, J O'Brien 1-2, E Kelly 1-0, C Dowdall 0-3, M Buggy 0-1. |

| 27 March 1966 | Tipperary | 4-11 - 2-5 | Kilkenny | Nenagh |
| | M Keating 2-2, P Doyle 1-1, T English 1-1, Jimmy Doyle 0-4, M Roche 0-2, J McKenna 0-1. | | E Keher 1-3, P Dillon 1-0, S Cleere 0-1, T Walsh 0-1. | Referee: J Duggan (Galway) |

=== Division 1B table ===
| Pos | Team | Pld | W | D | L | Diff | Pts | Notes |
|---|---|---|---|---|---|---|---|---|
| 1 | Cork | 4 | 3 | 0 | 1 | 28 | 6 | |
| 2 | Clare | 4 | 3 | 0 | 1 | 5 | 6 | |
| 3 | Limerick | 4 | 2 | 0 | 2 | 10 | 4 | |
| 4 | Dublin | 4 | 1 | 0 | 3 | -4 | 2 | |
| 5 | Galway | 4 | 1 | 0 | 3 | -39 | 2 | |

=== Group stage ===
| 3 October 1965 | Limerick | 2-7 - 1-9 | Dublin | Gaelic Grounds, Limerick |
| | J Shields 1-1, J Collum 1-0, E Cregan 0-3, B Hartigan 0-3. | | A Boothman 0-5, D Bohane 1-0, E Woods 0-2, P Maycock 0-1, F Berry 0-1. |

| 3 October 1965 | Galway | 3-9 - 3-5 | Clare | Athenry |
| | S Coffey 1-5, M Fox 1-0, S Flynn 1-0, P Mitchell 0-2, PJ Qualter 0-1, M Sweeney 0-1. | | M Kelly 2-0, H McCabe 1-1, J Cullinane 0-1, M O'Shea 0-1, J Teefy 0-1, V Loftus 0-1. |

| 11 October 1965 | Dublin | 4-14 - 3-7 | Galway | Croke Park, Dublin |
| | A Boothman 1-2, D Doody 0-5, B Boothman 1-1, A Loughnane 1-1, E Malone 1-0, E Woods 0-2, W Byrne 0-1, P Maycock 0-1, F Berry 0-1. | | F Coffey 1-5, M Regan 1-0, M Boyle 1-0, G Lowan 0-1, J Conroy 0-1. | Referee: P Ryan (Tipperary) |

| 7 November 1965 | Cork | 4-6 - 1-3 | Dublin | Cork Athletic Grounds, Cork |
| | J Bennett 2-2, E O'Brien 1-1, C Sheehan 1-0, J Russell 0-1, T O'Mahony 0-1, J McCarthy 0-1. | | ET Loughnane 1-1, A Boothman 0-2. |

| 28 November 1965 | Clare | 0-11 - 2-4 | Cork | Cusack Park, Ennis |
| | P Cronin 0-4, L Danagher 0-3, M Keane 0-1, M Slattery 0-1, M O'Shea 0-1, J Teffy 0-1. | | M Archer 2-0, JK Coleman 0-2, C McCarthy 0-1, C Roche 0-1. |

| 28 November 1965 | Galway | 3-3 - 8-14 | Limerick | Ballinasloe |
| | C Dunne 1-1, B O'Connor 1-0, M Devlin 1-0, F Coffey 0-2. | | P Casey 3-1, E Carey 1-4, E Cregan 1-3, S Quaid 1-1, J Geary 1-1, J Bresnihan 1-0, B Hartigan 0-2, E Bennis 0-1, P Bennis 0-1. |

| 6 February 1966 | Dublin | 1-10 - 2-8 | Clare | Croke Park, Dublin |
| | A Boothman 0-6, T Woods 1-0, J Cullen 0-1, P Maycock 0-1, E Malone 0-1, N Kinsella 0-1. | | M O'Shea 1-1, M Keane 1-0, P Cronin 0-3, M Slattery 0-2, H McCabe 0-1, S Cleary 0-1. | Referee: J Hatton (Wicklow) |

| 13 February 1966 | Limerick | 0-7 - 3-8 | Cork | FitzGerald Park, Kilmallock |
| | B Hartigan 0-2, E Cregan 0-1, J Quid 0-1, P Carey 0-1, P Doherty 0-1, K Long 0-1. | | T Corbett 0-5, M Archer 1-1, J McCarthy 1-1, C Sheehan 1-0, J O'Halloran 0-1. |

| 13 March 1966 | Cork | 1-14 - 1-7 | Galway | Cork Athletic Grounds, Cork |
| | T Corbett 0-6, D Sheehan 1-0, T Roche 0-3, J McCarthy 0-3, JK Coleman 0-2. | | J Kilkenny 1-1, M Sweeney 0-3, F Coffey 0-2, G Lohan 0-1. |

| 20 March 1966 | Clare | 4-10 - 3-6 | Limerick | Cusack Park, Ennis |
| | P McNamara 3-0, M O'Shea 1-1, P Henchy 0-3, P Cronin 0-3, N Jordan 0-2, S Cleary 0-1. | | E Cregan 2-4, M Savage 1-0, K Long 0-1, B Hartigan 0-1. | Referee: A Higgins (Galway) |

=== Play-off ===
| 20 March 1966 Play-off | Cork | 4-7 - 3-8 | Clare | FitzGerald Park, Kilmallock |
| | T Corbett 1-4, M Archer 1-1, C Sheehan 1-1, J McCarthy 1-0, D Sheehan 0-1. | | M Slattery 1-1, P Cronin 1-1, M Keane 1-0, P Henchy 0-3, S Cleary 0-2, P McNamara 0-1. |

=== Knock-out stage ===
Semi-finals

| 1 May 1966 Semi-final | Tipperary | 3-14 - 4-7 | Clare | Croke Park, Dublin |
| | Jimmy Doyle 1-5, M Keating 1-3, D Nealon 1-1, T English 0-2, L Devaney 0-1, L Kiely 0-1, M Burns 0-1. | | M O'Shea 3-0, L Danagher 1-0, P Cronin 0-3, P Henchy 0-2, N Pyne 0-1, N Jordan 0-1. | Attendance: 6,000; Referee: C Foley (Dublin) |

| 8 May 1966 Semi-final | Kilkenny | 4-11 - 1-8 | Cork | Croke Park, Dublin |
| | E Keher 1-8, J Teehan 1-1, J Dunphy 1-0, T Walsh 1-0, S Cleere 0-1, P Moran 0-1. | | J MCcarthy 0-4, D Sheehan 1-0, C Sheehan 0-2, P Doolan 0-1, G McCarthy 0-1. | Referee: J Flaherty (Galway) |

Home final

| 22 May 1966 Home final | Kilkenny | 0-9 - 0-7 | Tipperary | Croke Park, Dublin |
| | T Walsh 0-3, E Keher 0-2, S Buckley 0-2, M Coogan 0-1, J Teehan 0-1. | | L Devaney 0-3, Jimmy Doyle 0-2, T English 0-1, D Nealon 0-1. | Referee: J Dowling (Offaly) |

Finals

| 11 September 1966 First leg | Kilkenny | 3-10 - 2-7 | New York | Croke Park, Dublin |
| | P Carroll 2-1, J Dunphy 1-0, C Dunne 0-3, T Walsh 0-2, S Cleere 0-1, P Moran 0-1, J Teehan 0-1, S Buckley 0-1. | | M Curtin 0-5, B Kelleher 1-1, J Donoghue 1-0, D Long 0-1. | Attendance: 7,058; Referee: J Carey (New York) |

| 18 September 1966 Second leg | Kilkenny | 7-5 - 0-8 | New York | Nowlan Park, Kilkenny |
| | J Bennett 2-0, P Dillon 2-0, P Carroll 1-0, P Moran 1-0, S Buckley 1-0, C Dunne 0-3, T Walsh 0-2. | | B Hennessy 0-2, J Donoghue 0-2, D Long 0-1, J Doherty 0-1, B Ahern 0-1, M Curtin 0-1. | Attendance: 7,000 |

=== Scoring statistics ===
Top scorers overall

| Rank | Player | Team | Tally | Total |
|---|---|---|---|---|
| 1 | Jimmy Doyle | Tipperary | 4-20 | 32 |
| 2 | Michael Keating | Tipperary | 6-11 | 29 |
| 2 | Eddie Keher | Kilkenny | 3-20 | 29 |
| 3 | Tom Walsh | Kilkenny | 3-14 | 23 |
| 4 | Éamonn Cregan | Limerick | 3-11 | 20 |
| 5 | Mick O'Shea | Clare | 5-04 | 19 |
| 5 | Tom Cheasty | Waterford | 1-16 | 19 |
| 6 | Tom Corbett | Cork | 1-15 | 18 |
| 6 | Achille Boothman | Dublin | 1-15 | 18 |
| 7 | Claus Dunne | Kilkenny | 2-11 | 17 |

Top scorers in a single game

| Rank | Player | Club | Tally | Total | Opposition |
|---|---|---|---|---|---|
| 1 | Jimmy Doyle | Tipperary | 2-05 | 11 | Waterford |
| 1 | Jack Conroy | Laois | 2-05 | 11 | Kilkenny |
| 1 | Eddie Keher | Kilkenny | 1-08 | 11 | Cork |
| 2 | Pat Carey | Limerick | 3-01 | 10 | Galway |
| 2 | Éamonn Cregan | Limerick | 2-04 | 10 | Clare |
| 2 | Eddie Keher | Kilkenny | 1-07 | 10 | Wexford |
| 3 | Seán McLoughlin | Tipperary | 3-00 | 9 | Waterford |
| 3 | Michael Keating | Tipperary | 3-00 | 9 | Laois |
| 3 | Paddy McNamara | Clare | 3-00 | 9 | Limerick |
| 3 | Mick O'Shea | Clare | 3-00 | 9 | Tipperary |

=== Miscellaneous ===
- Kilkenny's defeat of Tipperary in the league decider is their first defeat of Tipperary in a national final since the 1922 All-Ireland final.

== Division 2 ==
National Hurling League Division 2
- Season: 1965-66
- Champions: Offaly
- Matches played: 23
- All statistics correct as of 20 February 2017.

On 24 April 1966, Offaly won the title after a 4-11 to 3-9 win over Kerry in the final.

=== Division 2A table ===
| Pos | Team | Pld | W | D | L | Diff | Pts | Notes |
|---|---|---|---|---|---|---|---|---|
| 1 | Antrim | 4 | 2 | 2 | 0 | 11 | 6 | |
| 2 | Westmeath | 4 | 3 | 0 | 1 | 5 | 6 | |
| 3 | Roscommon | 4 | 2 | 1 | 1 | 15 | 5 | |
| 4 | Meath | 4 | 1 | 1 | 2 | 14 | 3 | |
| 5 | Down | 4 | 0 | 0 | 4 | -45 | 0 | |

=== Division 2B table ===
| Pos | Team | Pld | W | D | L | Diff | Pts | Notes |
|---|---|---|---|---|---|---|---|---|
| 1 | Offaly | 4 | 4 | 0 | 0 | 46 | 8 | Division 2 champions |
| 2 | Kerry | 4 | 3 | 0 | 1 | -7 | 6 | |
| 3 | Kildare | 4 | 2 | 0 | 2 | -10 | 4 | |
| 4 | Carlow | 4 | 1 | 0 | 3 | 2 | 2 | |
| 5 | Wicklow | 4 | 0 | 0 | 4 | -31 | 0 | |

=== Knock-out stage ===
Semi-finals

| 27 March 1966 Semi-final | Antrim | 2-2 - 5-9 | Kerry | Croke Park, Dublin |

| 3 April 1966 Semi-final | Westmeath | 5-4 - 6-10 | Offaly | Croke Park, Dublin |

Final

| 24 April 1966 Final | Offaly | 4-11 - 3-9 | Kerry | Croke Park, Dublin |

== Division 3 ==
National Hurling League Division 3
- Season: 1965-66
- Champions: Mayo
- All statistics correct as of 4 March 2017.

On 9 October 1966, Mayo won the title after a 1-12 to 1-8 win over Armagh in the final.

=== Knock-out stage ===
Semi-final

| 31 July 1966 Semi-final | Armagh | 4-10 - 2-6 | Louth |

Final

| 9 October 1966 Final | Armagh | 1-8 - 1-12 | Mayo | Athletic Grounds, Armagh |
