= 1966 Railway Cup Hurling Championship =

Irish hurling competition

- Dates: 28 February 1966 – 17 March 1966
- Teams: 4
- Champions: Munster (28th title); Jimmy Doyle (captain)
- Runners-up: Leinster

Tournament statistics
- Matches played: 3
- Goals scored: 24 (8 per match)
- Points scored: 58 (19.33 per match)
- Top scorer(s): Frankie Walsh (2-07)

The 1966 Railway Cup Hurling Championship was the 40th staging of the Railway Cup since its establishment by the Gaelic Athletic Association in 1927. The cup began on 28 February 1966 and ended on 17 March 1966.

Leinster were the defending champions.

On 17 March 1966, Munster won the cup following a 3-13 to 3-11 defeat of Leinster in the final. This was their 28th Railway Cup title and their first since 1963.

Munster's Frankie Walsh was the top scorer with 2-07.

== Results ==
Semi-finals

27 February 1966 Semi-final	Connacht	3-03 - 6-10	Munster	Duggan Park, Ballinasloe
	M Regan 2-1, F Connaire 1-0, F Coffey 0-1, J Conway 0-1.		J Doyle 2-5, S McLoughlin 2-0, J McKenna 1-2, D Nealon 1-1, M Roche 0-1, L Danagher 0-1.

6 March 1966 Semi-final	Ulster	3-07 - 6-14	Leinster	Pearse Park, Ballybay
	J Campbell 1-4, B Campbell 1-0, P McShane 1-0, E Faloona 0-1, S Gallagher 0-1, P Branniff 0-1.		T Walsh 2-0, P Dillon 2-0, E Keher 1-3, B Cooney 1-2, W Walsh 0-3, S Cleere 0-2, J O'Brien 0-2, J Foley 0-1, D Quigley 0-1.	Referee: C Foley (Dublin)

Final

17 March 1966 Final	Munster	3-13 - 3-11	Leinster	Croke Park, Dublin
	F Walsh 2-7, D Nealon 1-1, L Kiely 0-3, J McKenna 0-2.		E Keher 1-2, T Walsh 1-2, P Dillon 1-1, T Forrestal 0-2, J O'Brien 0-1, S Cleere 0-1, B Cooney 0-1, P Molloy 0-1.	Attendance: 24,312; Referee: MJ Flaherty (Galway)

== Statistics ==
Top scorers overall

Rank	Player	Club	Tally	Total	Matches	Average
1	Frankie Walsh	Munster	2-07	13	1	13.00
2	Tom Walsh	Leinster	3-02	11	2	5.50
2	Jimmy Doyle	Munster	2-05	11	2	5.50
2	Eddie Keher	Leinster	2-05	11	2	5.50
3	Pa Dillon	Leinster	3-01	10	2	5.00

Top scorers in a single game

Rank	Player	Club	Tally	Total	Opposition
1	Frankie Walsh	Munster	2-07	13	Leinster
2	Jimmy Doyle	Munster	2-05	11	Connacht
3	Mick Regan	Connacht	2-01	7	Munster
3	J. Campbell	Ulster	1-04	7	Leinster
4	Seán McLoughlin	Munster	2-00	6	Connacht
4	Tom Walsh	Leinster	2-00	6	Ulster
4	Pa Dillon	Leinster	2-00	6	Ulster
4	Eddie Keher	Leinster	1-03	6	Ulster

== Bibliography ==
- Donegan, Des, The Complete Handbook of Gaelic Games (DBA Publications Limited, 2005).
