= 1965 Railway Cup Hurling Championship =

Irish hurling competition

- Dates: 21 February 1965 – 17 February 1965
- Teams: 4
- Champions: Leinster (10th title); Paddy Moran (captain)
- Runners-up: Munster

Tournament statistics
- Matches played: 3
- Goals scored: 15 (5 per match)
- Points scored: 45 (15 per match)
- Top scorer(s): Eddie Keher (3-04)

The 1965 Railway Cup Hurling Championship was the 39th staging of the Railway Cup since its establishment by the Gaelic Athletic Association in 1927. The cup started on 21 February 1965 and ended on 17 March 1965.

Leinster were the defending champions.

On 17 March 1965, Leinster won the cup following a 3-11 to 0-09 defeat of Munster in the final. This was their 10th Railway Cup title and their first since 1962.

Leinster's Eddie Keher was the top scorer with 3-04.

== Results ==
Semi-finals

21 February 1965 Semi-final	Connacht	2-03 - 4-09	Leinster	Pearse Stadium, Galway
	J Conroy 1-0, P Burns 1-0, N Keary 0-2, M Sweeeny 0-1.		E Keher 2-0, M Bermingham 1-1, J O'Brien 0-4, T Walsh 1-0, C O'Brien 0-2, P Bradley 0-1, P Moran 0-1.	Referee: J Smyth (Clare)

28 February 1965 Semi-final	Ulster	3-02 - 3-11	Munster	Casement Park, Belfast
	S Burns 1-1, J Phelan 1-0, T Purcell 1-0, B McGurk 0-1.		M Keating 2-3, PJ Keane 0-4, L Devaney 1-0, Jimmy Doyle 0-3, T Wall 0-1.	Referee: C Foley (Dublin)

Final

17 March 1965 Final	Leinster	3-11 - 0-09	Munster	Croke Park, Dublin
	M Bermingham 2-2, E Keher 1-4, T Walsh 0-2, J O'Brien 0-2, S Cleere 0-1.		Jimmy Doyle 0-4, L Devaney 0-2, J Bennett 0-2, M Roche 0-1.	Attendance: 30,734; Referee: J Duggan (Galway)

== Scoring statistics ==
Top scorers overall

Rank	Player	Club	Tally	Total	Matches	Average
1	Eddie Keher	Leinster	3-04	13	2	6.50
2	Mick Bermingham	Leinster	3-03	12	2	6.00
3	Michael Keating	Munster	2-03	9	2	4.50

Top scorers in a single game

Rank	Player	Club	Tally	Total	Opposition
1	Michael Keating	Munster	2-03	9	Ulster
2	Mick Bermingham	Leinster	2-02	8	Munster
3	Eddie Keher	Leinster	1-04	7	Munster
4	Eddie Keher	Leinster	2-00	6	Connacht
5	Mick Bermingham	Leinster	1-01	4	Connacht
5	S. Burns	Ulster	1-01	4	Munster
5	Jimmy O'Brien	Leinster	0-04	4	Connacht
5	P. J. Keane	Munster	0-04	4	Ulster
5	Jimmy Doyle	Munster	0-04	4	Leinster

== Bibliography ==
- Donegan, Des, The Complete Handbook of Gaelic Games (DBA Publications Limited, 2005).
