= 1964 Railway Cup Hurling Championship =

Irish hurling competition

- Match programme
- Dates: 16 February 1964 – 17 February 1964
- Teams: 4
- Champions: Leinster (9th title); Séamus Cleere (captain)
- Runners-up: Munster; Phil Grimes (captain)

Tournament statistics
- Matches played: 3
- Goals scored: 21 (7 per match)
- Points scored: 43 (14.33 per match)
- Top scorer(s): Eddie Keher (2-09)

The 1964 Railway Cup Hurling Championship was the 38th staging of the Railway Cup since its establishment by the Gaelic Athletic Association in 1927. The cup began on 16 February 1964 and ended on 17 March 1964.

Munster were the defending champions.

On 17 March 1964, Leinster won the championship following a 3–07 to 2–09 defeat of Munster in the final. This was their 10th Railway Cup title and their first since 1962.

Leinster's Eddie Keher was the Railway Cup top scorer with 2-09.

== Results ==
Semi-final

| 16 February 1964 Semi-final | Munster | 4-09 - 3-05 | Connacht | Gaelic Grounds, Limerick |
| | J Smyth 2-2, P Grimes 1-2, Jimmy Doyle 1-1, M Flannelly 0-4. | | M Fox 2-0, PJ Lally 1-1, M Sweeney 0-1, M Connaughton 0-1, J Salmon 0-1, PJ Lawless 0-1. |

| 16 February 1964 Semi-final | Leinster | 8-09 - 1-04 | Ulster | Croke Park, Dublin |
| | T Walsh 3-2, N Wheeler 3-0, M Bermingham 2-1, E Keher 0-4, T Ring 0-2. | | S Phelan 1-1, A Forsyth 0-2, E Gallagher 0-1. |

Final

| 17 March 1964 Final | Leinster | 3-07 - 2-09 | Munster | Croke Park, Dublin |
| 2:30 p.m. | E Keher 2-5, C O'Brien 1-0, F Whelan 0-1, P Moran 0-1. | | L Devaney 2-2, Jimmy Doyle 0-4, J Smyth 0-2, P Cronin 0-1. | Attendance: 23,621; Referee: C Foley (Dublin) |

== Statistics ==
=== Scoring ===
Top scorers overall

| Rank | Player | Club | Tally | Total | Matches | Average |
|---|---|---|---|---|---|---|
| 1 | Eddie Keher | Leinster | 2-09 | 16 | 2 | 8.00 |
| 2 | Tom Walsh | Leinster | 3-02 | 11 | 2 | 5.50 |
| 3 | Jimmy Smyth | Munster | 2-04 | 10 | 2 | 5.00 |
| 4 | Ned Wheeler | Leinster | 3-00 | 9 | 2 | 4.50 |
| 5 | Jimmy Doyle | Munster | 1-05 | 8 | 2 | 4.00 |

Top scorers in a single game

| Rank | Player | Club | Tally | Total | Opposition |
|---|---|---|---|---|---|
| 1 | Tom Walsh | Leinster | 3-02 | 11 | Ulster |
| 1 | Eddie Keher | Leinster | 2-05 | 11 | Munster |
| 2 | Ned Wheeler | Leinster | 3-00 | 9 | Ulster |
| 3 | Jimmy Smyth | Munster | 2-02 | 8 | Connacht |
| 3 | Liam Devaney | Munster | 2-02 | 8 | Leinster |
| 4 | Mick Bermingham | Leinster | 2-01 | 7 | Ulster |
| 5 | M. Fox | Connacht | 2-00 | 6 | Munster |
| 6 | Phil Grimes | Munster | 1-02 | 5 | Connacht |

=== Miscellaneous ===
- The Munster selectors dropped team captain Mick Flannelly from the panel after the semi-final. He was replaced as captain by Phil Grimes.

== Bibliography ==
- Donegan, Des, The Complete Handbook of Gaelic Games (DBA Publications Limited, 2005).
