= Tommy Ring (hurler) =

Irish hurler (1939–2020)

Personal information
- Native name: Tomás Ó Rinn (Irish)
- Born: 1939 Castlepollard, County Westmeath, Ireland
- Died: 1 July 2020 (aged 81) Rathcoole, County Dublin, Ireland

Sport
- Sport: Hurling
- Position: Right wing-forward
Clubs
- Years: Club
- Meelin; Castlepollard; New Irelands; Kilmacud Crokes
Club titles
- Westmeath titles: 1
Inter-county
- Years: County
- 1955–1972: Westmeath
Inter-county titles
- Leinster titles: 0
- All-Irelands: 0
- NHL: 0
- All Stars: 0

Thomas O. Ring (1939 – 1 July 2020) was an Irish hurler. At club level he played for a number of clubs, including Castlepollard and Kilmacud Crokes, and was a long-time member of the Westmeath senior hurling team.

== Playing career ==
Born in Castlepollard, Ring was the son of a Cork-born father and a Louth-born mother and first played hurling when he joined the local Castlepollard club. He earned a call-up to the Westmeath minor team in 1954, before later moving to Cork and lining out with the Meelin club as a junior. On his return to Castlepollard, Ring won a county minor medal in 1956 and was promoted to the Westmeath senior team as goalkeeper at 18 years of age, a position he retained on and off for a further seven years. After winning a National League Division 2 in 1961, he ended the year by captaining Castlepollard to a county senior championship. Work brought Ring to Dublin, where he hurled for New Irelands for three years before later joining the Kilmacud Crokes club. By this stage he had switched from goalkeeper to midfielder and forward with the Westmeath senior team and claimed a second Division 2 title in 1964 before becoming one of the top marksmen of the 1960s and early 1970s. After his inter-county career ended in 1972, Ring continued to line out with Kilmacud Crokes and won county senior championship medals in 1974 and 1976. In retirement he came to be regarded as one of Westmeath's greatest-ever hurlers and was selected in the right wing-forward position on the Westmeath Hurling Team of the Millennium.

== Personal life ==
Ring died in Rathcoole, County Dublin on 1 July 2020. He was survived by his wife Therese and six children. His son, Connie Ring, lined out with the Craobh Chiaráin club and was a member of the Dublin senior hurling team.

== Honours ==
Castlepollard

- Westmeath Senior Hurling Championship (1): 1961 (c)

Kilmacud Crokes

- Dublin Senior Hurling Championship (2): 1974, 1976

Westmeath

- National Hurling League (Division 2) (2): 1960-61, 1963-64

Leinster

- Railway Cup (1): 1964

Awards

- Westmeath Hurling Team of the Millennium: Right wing-forward
