= 1967 Railway Cup Hurling Championship =

Irish hurling competition

- Dates: 26 February 1967 - 17 February 1967
- Teams: 4
- Champions: Leinster (11th title); Ollie Walsh (captain)
- Runners-up: Munster

Tournament statistics
- Matches played: 3
- Goals scored: 26 (8.67 per match)
- Points scored: 48 (16 per match)
- Top scorer(s): Eddie Keher (4-10)

The 1967 Railway Cup Hurling Championship was the 41st staging of the Railway Cup since its establishment by the Gaelic Athletic Association in 1927. The cup began on 26 February 1967 and ended on 17 March 1967.

Munster were the defending champions.

On 17 March 1967, Leinster won the cup following a 2-14 to 3-05 defeat of Munster in the final. This was their 11th Railway Cup title and their first since 1965.

Leinster's Eddie Keher was the top scorer with 4-10.

== Results ==
Semi-finals

26 February 1967 Semi-final	Leinster	10-10 - 3-02	Connacht	Croke Park, Dublin
	T Walsh 4-0, E Keher 2-4, P Molloy 3-0, C Dunne 1-0, H Dalton 0-3, J Bennett 0-2, P Moran 0-1.		S Stannley 1-0, PJ Qualter 1-0, M Fox 1-0, B Lally 0-1, J Conroy 0-1.	Referee: MT Lyne (Kildare)

26 February 1967 Semi-final	Munster	6-11 - 2-06	Leinster	Croke Park, Dublin
	T Bluett 2-0, J McCarthy 1-3, J O'Halloran 1-2, B Hartigan 1-2, S Barry 1-0, J McKenna 0-3, P Cronin 0-1.		S Richmond 1-0, B McGarry 1-0, P McShane 0-2, H O'Prey 0-1, P Branniff 0-1.	Referee: C Foley (Dublin)

Final

17 March 1967 Final	Leinster	2-14 - 3-05	Munster	Croke Park, Dublin
	E Keher 2-6, C Dunne 0-3, J Teehan 0-2, T Walsh 0-2, P Molloy 0-1.		M Roche 1-2, S Barry 1-1, J O'Halloran 1-0, P Cronin 0-1, B Hartigan 0-1.	Attendance: 22,000; Referee: T Boyle (Roscommon)

== Scoring statistics ==
Top scorers overall

Rank	Player	Club	Tally	Total	Matches	Average
1	Eddie Keher	Leinster	4-10	22	2	11.00
2	Tom Walsh	Leinster	4-02	14	2	7.00
3	Paddy Molloy	Leinster	3-01	10	2	5.00

Top scorers in a single game

Rank	Player	Club	Tally	Total	Opposition
1	Tom Walsh	Leinster	4-00	12	Connacht
1	Eddie Keher	Leinster	2-06	12	Munster
2	Eddie Keher	Leinster	2-04	10	Connacht
3	Paddy Molloy	Leinster	3-00	9	Connacht
4	Tom Bluett	Munster	2-00	6	Ulster
5	Mick Roche	Munster	1-02	5	Leinster
5	Seánie Barry	Munster	1-01	5	Leinster

== Bibliography ==
- Donegan, Des, The Complete Handbook of Gaelic Games (DBA Publications Limited, 2005).
