= 1965 All-Ireland Senior Hurling Championship =

Championship details
- Dates: 25 April – 5 September 1965
- Teams: 13

All-Ireland champions
- Winning team: Tipperary (21st win)
- Captain: Jimmy Doyle

All-Ireland Finalists
- Losing team: Wexford
- Captain: Tom Neville

Provincial champions
- Munster: Tipperary
- Leinster: Wexford
- Ulster: Not Played
- Connacht: Not Played

Championship statistics
- No. matches played: 13
- Goals total: 60 (4.6 per game)
- Points total: 234 (18.0 per game)
- Top Scorer: Paddy Molloy (4–12)
- Player of the Year: Jimmy Doyle
- All-Star Team: See here

The 1965 All-Ireland Senior Hurling Championship was the 79th staging of the All-Ireland hurling championship since its establishment by the Gaelic Athletic Association in 1887. The championship began on 25 April 1965 and ended on 5 September 1965.

Tipperary were the defending champions, and retained their All-Ireland crown following a 2–16 to 0–10 defeat of Wexford. It was the team's fourth All-Ireland championship in five years.

== Teams ==
A total of thirteen teams contested the championship, the same number and makeup of participants from the previous championship.

=== Team summaries ===
Team	Colours	Most recent success		
Team	Colours	All-Ireland	Provincial	League
Carlow	Red, green and yellow			
Clare	Saffron and blue	1914	1932	1945–46
Cork	Red and white	1954	1956	1952–53
Dublin	Blue and navy	1938	1961	1938–39
Galway	Maroon and white	1923		1950–51
Kilkenny	Black and amber	1963	1964	1932–33
Laois	Blue and white	1915	1949	
Limerick	Green and white	1940	1955	1946–47
Offaly	Green, white and gold			
Tipperary	Blue and gold	1964	1964	1964–65
Waterford	White and blue	1959	1963	1962–63
Westmeath	Maroon and white			
Wexford	Purple and gold	1960	1962	1957–58

== Results ==
=== Leinster Senior Hurling Championship ===
First round

25 April 1965 First round	Offaly	5–12 – 0–6	Carlow	O'Moore Park
	P Molloy 2–7, W Gorman 1–1, N Delaney 1–0, B Loughnan 1–0, E Fox 0–2, B Moylan 0–2.		L Walsh 0–2, J Hickey 0–2, W Horgan 0–2.	Referee: P Buggy (Kilkenny)

23 May 1965 First round	Laois	5–6 – 2–5	Westmeath	O'Connor Park
	C O'Brien 2–2, J Conroy 2–0, J Fitzpatrick 1–1, P Muldowney 0–2, J Lyons 0–1.		J Rooney 1–1, M Flanagan 1–1, P Brady 0–2, T Ring 0–1.	Referee: J Grey (Dublin)

Quarter-final

13 June 1965 Quarter-final	Offaly	2–9 – 2–14	Laois	St. Brendan's Park
	P Molloy 2–5, W Gorman 0–3, B Loughnane 0–1.		C O'Brien 1–5, P Bates 1–2, S Cashin 0–2, E Jones 0–2, J Conroy 0–2, T Walshe 0–1.	Referee: P Buggy (Kilkenny)

Semi-finals

27 June 1965 Semi-final	Kilkenny	1–20 – 3–8	Dublin	O'Moore Park
	E Keher 0–8, T Walsh 1–3, P Carroll 0–3, C Dunne 0–2, C Cleere 0–2, S Buckley 0–1, P Moran 0–1.		M Bermingham 0–5, S Lynch 1–0, B Cooney 1–0, A Loughnane 1–0, D Foley 0–2, E Malone 0–1.	Attendance: 10,000; Referee: J Maddock (Wexford)

11 July 1965 Semi-final	Wexford	1–15 – 2–6	Laois	Croke Park
	O McGrath 1–3, J Foley 0–5, J Nolan 0–2, J O'Brien 0–2, P Ryan 0–1, P Wilson 0–1, L Butler 0–1.		C O'Brien 1–1, J Lyons 1–0, J Conroy 0–1, P Dooley 0–1, M Murphy 0–1, C Cuddy 0–1.	Referee: P Buggy (Kilkenny)

Final

1 August 1965 Final	Wexford	2–11 – 3–7	Kilkenny	Croke Park
	M Byrne 2–1, D Shannon 0–3, O McGrath 0–2, M Codd 0–2, J Foley 0–1, P Wilson 0–1, T Neville 0–1.		T Walsh 1–2, E Keher 1–1, P Carroll 1–0, C Dunne 0–2, P Carroll 0–1, A Comerford 0–1.	Attendance: 28,000; Referee: J Grey (Dublin)

=== Munster Senior Hurling Championship ===
Quarter-finals

6 June 1965 Quarter-final	Galway	3–10 – 4–8	Clare	Pearse Stadium
	S Coffey 1–6, M Fox 2–1, P Mitchell 0–2, P Burns 0–1.		P Cronin 2–1, P Dunne 1–1, J McCarthy 1–0, N Jordan 0–3, M Danaher 0–1, V Loftus 0–1, M Slattery 0–1.	Attendance: 8,000; Referee: P Ryan

6 June 1965 Quarter-final	Waterford	3–8 – 2–9	Limerick	Cork Athletic Grounds
	F Walsh 1–3, P Grimes 1–1, J Kirwan 1–0, J O'Brien 0–2, J O'Byrne 0–1, T Cheasty 0–1.		É Cregan 1–2, T Bluett 1–0, B Hartigan 0–2, P Murphy 0–2, D O'Flynn 0–1, T Moloney 0–1, E Carey 0–1.	Referee: P Cronin (Cork)

Semi-finals

27 June 1965 Semi-final	Tipperary	5–8 – 3–3	Clare	Gaelic Grounds
	S McLoughlin 2–0, M Keating 1–3, D Nealon 1–1, M Roche 1–0, J McKenna 0–2, J Doyle 0–1, L Devaney 0–1.		M O'Shea 1–0, D Pyne 1–0, N Pyne 1–0, P Cronin 0–2, J Woods 0–1.	Attendance: 12,000; Referee: T Higgins

4 July 1965 Semi-final	Cork	2–6 – 2–6	Waterford	Gaelic Grounds
	J Bennett 0–4, E O'Brien 1–1, C Sheehan 1–0, C McCarthy 0–1.		F Walsh 1–2, M Flannelly 1–0, P Grimes 0–1, J Byrne 0–1, T Cheasty 0–1, M Óg Morrissey 0–1,	Attendance: 20,000

11 July 1965 Semi-final replay	Cork	1–11 – 2–5	Waterford	Gaelic Grounds
	J Bennett 1–3, E O'Brien 0–4, J McCarthy 0–1, C McCarthy 0–1, N Gallagher 0–1, D Murphy 0–1.		J Kirwan 2–0, P Grimes 0–2, S Power 0–2, T Cheasty 0–1.	Attendance: 25,500; Referee: T Higgins (Galway)

Final

25 July 1965 Final	Tipperary	4–11 – 0–5	Cork	Gaelic Grounds
	T English 2–1, J Doyle 0–7, S McLoughlin 2–0, D Nealon 0–1, J McKenna 0–1, P Doyle 0–1.		J Bennett 0–3, P Harte 0–1, J McCarthy 0–1.	Attendance: 39,687; Referee: J Smyth (Clare)

=== All-Ireland Senior Hurling Championship ===
Final

5 September 1965 Final	Tipperary	2–16 – 0–10	Wexford	Croke Park
	S McLoughlin 2–1, J Doyle 0–6, J McKenna 0–5, L Kiely 0–2, T English 0–1, L Devaney 0–1.		J O'Brien 0–4, M Codd 0–3, D Shannon 0–3.	Attendance: 67,498; Referee: M Hayes (Clare)

== Championship statistics ==
=== Scoring ===
Top scorers overall

Rank	Player	Club	Tally	Total	Matches	Average
1	Paddy Molloy	Offaly	4–12	24	2	12.00
2	Seán McLoughlin	Tipperary	6-01	19	3	6.33
3	Christy O'Brien	Laois	3-07	16	2	8.00
4	Jimmy Doyle	Tipperary	0–14	14	3	4.66
5	Eddie Keher	Kilkenny	1-09	12	2	6.00

Top scorers in a single game

Rank	Player	Club	Tally	Total	Opposition
1	Paddy Molloy	Offaly	2-07	13	Carlow
2	Paddy Molloy	Offaly	2-05	11	Laois
3	Frank Coffey	Galway	1-06	9	Clare
4	Christy O'Brien	Laois	2-02	8	Westmeath
4	Christy O'Brien	Laois	1-05	8	Offaly
4	Eddie Keher	Kilkenny	0-08	8	Dublin
4	Martin Byrne	Wexford	2-01	7	Kilkenny
4	Mattie Fox	Galway	2-01	7	Clare
4	Pat Cronin	Clare	2-01	7	Galway
4	Theo English	Tipperary	2-01	7	Cork
4	Seán McLoughlin	Tipperary	2-01	7	Wexford
4	Jimmy Doyle	Tipperary	0-07	7	Cork
