= Jimmy O'Brien (hurler) =

Irish hurler (born 1938)

Jimmy O’Brien
Personal information
- Native name: Séamus Ó Briain (Irish)
- Born: 1938 (age 87–88) New Ross, County Wexford, Ireland
- Height: 5 ft 8 in (173 cm)

Sport
- Sport: Hurling
- Position: Right wing-forward
Club
- Years: Club
- Geraldine O’Hanrahans
Club titles
- Wexford titles: 1
Inter-county
Years	County	Apps (scores)
1957-1968	Wexford	24 (8-35)
Inter-county titles
- Leinster titles: 4
- All-Irelands: 2
- NHL: 2

James O’Brien (born 1938) is an Irish former hurler. At club level, he played with Geraldine O’Hanrahans and at inter-county level with the Wexford senior hurling team.

== Career ==
O'Brien first played hurling and Gaelic football at club level with Geraldine O’Hanrahans. He had his first success in 1957 when the club beat Shemaliers by 6-07 to 5-06 to win the Wexford IHC title. He added a Wexford JFC medal to his collection in 1963 after a defeat of Kilanerin in the final. O'Brien won a Wexford SHC medal in 1966, following Geraldine O'Hanrahans 2-10 to 3-o4 win over Enniscorthy Shamrocks in a final replay.

At inter-county level, O'Brien first played for Wexford as a member of the minor team. He progressed to the junior team and won a Leinster JHC title in 1957. O'Brien made his senior team debut during Wexford's National Hurling League-winning campaign in January 1957, however, it took a few years for him to become a regular member of the team.

O'Brien won his first Leinster SHC medal in 1960 and was at wing-forward for the 2-15 to 0-11 defeat of Tipperary in the 1960 All-Ireland final. He collected further Leinster SHC honours in 1962 and 1965, however, Wexford had subsequent All-Ireland final defeats by Tipperary on both occasions. O'Brien captained Wexford to the National Hurling League title in 1967. He collected a fourth and final Leinster SHC medal in 1968 before later claiming a second All-Ireland SHC medal after lining out in the 5-08 to 3-12 victory over Tipperary in the 1968 All-Ireland final.

Performances at inter-county level for Wexford resulted in O'Brien being called up to the Leinster inter-provincial team. He won his sole Railway Cup medal in 1965 following a defeat of Munster in the final.

== Honours ==
Geraldine O'Hanrahans GAA

- Wexford Senior Hurling Championship: 1966
- Wexford Intermediate Hurling Championship: 1957
- Wexford Junior Football Championship: 1963

Wexford

- All-Ireland Senior Hurling Championship: 1960, 1968
- Leinster Senior Hurling Championship: 1960, 1962, 1965, 1968
- National Hurling League: 1957–58, 1966–67 (c)
- Leinster Junior Hurling Championship: 1957

Leinster

- Railway Cup: 1965

Sporting positions
Preceded by	Wexford senior hurling team captain 1967	Succeeded by Dan Quigley
