= Pat Cronin =

Irish hurler

Personal information
- Nickname: Fagan
- Born: Newmarket-on-Fergus, County Clare, Ireland

Sport
- Sport: Hurling
- Position: Right wing-forward
Club
- Years: Club
- Newmarket-on-Fergus
Inter-county
Years	County	Apps (scores)
1963-1970	Clare	14 (9-46)
Inter-county titles
- Munster titles: 0
- All-Irelands: 0
- NHL: 0

Pat "Fagan" Cronin is a former Irish hurler who played as a right wing-forward for the Clare senior hurling team. He captained his club, Newmarket-on-Fergus GAA club, to win the 1967 Clare Senior Club Hurling Championship. He also participated in the Munster's successful interprovincial Railway Cup campaign of 1968.

== Honours ==
Munster

- Railway Cup (1): 1968

Sporting positions
Preceded by Jimmy Smyth	Clare Senior Hurling Captain; 1964	Succeeded by Jimmy Cullinane
Preceded by Jimmy Cullinane	Clare Senior Hurling Captain; 1966	Succeeded by Vincent Loftus
Preceded by Vincent Loftus	Clare Senior Hurling Captain; 1968	Succeeded by Jimmy Cullinane
