= Mick Bermingham =

Irish hurler

Personal information
- Native name: Mícheál Bermingham (Irish)
- Born: Ireland

Sport
- Sport: Hurling
- Position: Right Corner Forward
Clubs
- Years: Club
- 1951-1983 1964-1973: Kilmacud Crokes; Galway (New York)
Club titles
- Dublin titles: 2; 5 (New York titles)
Inter-county
Years	County	Apps (scores)
1961-1977	Dublin	58 (33-139)
Inter-county titles
- Leinster titles: 1
- All Stars: 1

Michael Bermingham is an Irish sportsperson. He played hurling for the Kilmacud Crokes club from 1951 until 1983 and was a member of the Dublin senior inter-county team.

Bermingham was selected on the Rest of Ireland Team in 1965. This was like the fore-runner to the All Stars, a team sponsored by the now defunct “Gaelic Weekly”. In 1971 he was selected at right-corner-forward in the first ever All Stars team, Dublin's first All Star, having finished the season as one of the top scorers. In 1984 he was named on the Centenary Team of players who had not won All-Ireland honours.

== Early years ==
Bermingham was born in Ireland began playing in his youth.

== Playing career ==
=== Club ===
Bermingham won ten club championships, seven of which while playing in New York between 1965 and 1974. He won two Dublin Senior Hurling Championships in 1974 and 1976 and an Intermediate Championship in 1982.

Bermingham played his first game for Kilmacud Crokes in 1951 and, with a few interruptions, continued to play for the club until 1983, when business pressures put him off the panel. As a juvenile, Bermingham played in a number of games, including in the first ever Under 13 Juvenile Championships (beaten in the Irish Press Shield final). During the early 1950s, he played Scoil Uí Chonaill in the Under 15 Final. He also played on the Under 16½ team that won the championship in 1955.

There was a temporary split in the club in the early 1960s, which resulted in the formation of Dalcassians. A number of younger Crokes players left to join the new club and even won a Minor Championship, captained by Bermingham, in 1960. Differences had been resolved by 1962 and in 1963, with forces joined afresh, a team (boasting a substantial majority of Crokes players) representing the Junior Hurling Board won the Senior Championship and the Intermediate Championship was also won by Crokes that year.

One of the biggest influences on Bermingham was John Howard. John Howard, was a Garda stationed at Pearse St in central Dublin, was also one of the reasons Bermingham did not opt to play for Faughs, despite the fact that his father Ned was a committed Faughs supporter and his cousin Mick Gill was a star of the team in the 1930s and 1940s. Faughs did not have a juvenile team and, as the young Crokes stars developed and bonded under the guidance of John Howard, there was every incentive to stay put.

Bermingham continues to be involved in Crokes and was part of the Senior Team Management until 2005.

=== Inter-county ===
In 1961, Dublin beat Wexford 7-5 to 4-8 in the Leinster Final and went on to play Tipperary in the All-Ireland Final where they were narrowly beaten 0-16 to 1-12. However, due to injury, Bermingham did not get to play in either game.

=== Inter-provincial ===
Bermingham won six Railway Cup medals with Leinster, these include a double (1964–65) and a four in a row (1971–74).

== Honours ==
=== Dalcassians ===
- Dublin Minor Hurling Championship

Winner (1): 1960 (Capt.)

=== Galway ===
- New York Senior Hurling Championship

Winner (5): 1964, 1965, 1966, 1970, 1973

=== Kilmacud Crokes ===
- Dublin Senior Hurling Championship

Winner (2): 1974, 1976

- Dublin Intermediate Hurling Championship

Winner (1): 1982

=== Dublin ===
- All-Ireland Senior Hurling Championship

Runner-up (1): 1961

- Leinster Senior Hurling Championship

Winner (1): 1961

=== Leinster ===
- Railway Cup

Winner (6): 1964, 1965, 1971, 1972, 1973, 1974

=== Individual ===
- Hurling Team of the Century (Non-All-Ireland Winners)

Winner (1): 1984

- GAA All-Star

Winner (1): 1971

- Rest of Ireland Team

Winner (1): 1965
