= 1964–65 National Hurling League =

34th season of the National Hurling League

League details
- Dates: 11 October 1964 – 26 September 1965

League champions
- Winners: Tipperary (12th win)

Other division winners
- Division 2: Laois

The 1964–65 National Hurling League was the 34th season of the National Hurling League.

== Division 1 ==
National Hurling League Division 1
- Season: 1964-65
- Champions: Tipperary; 12th National League title Captain: Jimmy Doyle
- Matches played: 24
- Top goalscorer: Jimmy Doyle (7-42)
- Biggest home win: Tipperary 9-10 - 2-04 Clare (22 November 1964)
- Biggest away win: Waterford 6-10 - 1-07 Carlow (15 November 1964)
- Highest scoring: Tipperary 5-7 - 7-10 Kilkenny (4 April 1965)
- All statistics correct as of 4 March 2017.

Tipperary came into the season as defending champions of the 1963-64 season.

On 26 September 1965, Tipperary won the title after a 6-19 to 5-20 aggregate win over New York in the final. It was their 12th league title overall and their second in succession.

In spite of finishing at the bottom of their respective groups, neither Clare or Carlow were relegated.

Tipperary's Jimmy Doyle was the Division 1 top scorer with 7-42.

=== Group 1A table ===
Pos	Team	Pld	W	D	L	Pts	Notes
1	Kilkenny	4	4	0	0	8	
2	Tipperary	4	3	0	1	6	Division 1 champions
3	Cork	4	2	0	2	4	
4	Galway	4	1	0	3	2	
5	Clare	4	0	0	4	0	

=== Group stage ===
25 October 1964	Kilkenny	3-11 - 1-06	Galway	Nowlan Park, Kilkenny
	T Walsh 2-3, T Forrestal 1-2, J Teehan 0-3, C Dunne 0-1, E Keher 0-1, J Dunphy 0-1.		G Lohan 0-4, M Fox 1-0, N Keary 0-1, T Purcell 0-1.	Referee: S Power (Waterford)

8 November 1964	Clare	1-04 - 6-07	Kilkenny	Cusack Park, Ennis
	J Dunne 1-1, J Smith 0-1, M Hanrahan 0-1, S Cleary 0-1.		T Walsh 4-0, P Carroll 1-0, J Dunphy 1-0, S Buckley 0-3, T Forrestal 0-2, E Keher 0-1, P Moran 0-1.

22 November 1964	Tipperary	8-10 - 2-04	Clare	MacDonagh Park, Nenagh
	Jimmy Doyle 2-6, L Devaney 1-1, J McKenna 1-1, M Kearns 1-0, M Keating 1-0, T Walsh 1-0, S McLoughlin 1-0, M Roche 0-1, L Gaynor 0-1.		M O'Shea 1-1, M Hanrahan 1-0, S Cleary 0-2, L Danagher 0-1.

29 November 1964	Cork	2-12 - 4-08	Tipperary	Cork Athletic Grounds, Cork
	P Harte 1-4, N Gallagher 0-4, J Redmond 1-0, J Bennett 0-2, W Carroll 0-1, J O'Sullivan 0-1.		Jimmy Doyle 0-5, J McKenna 1-1, S Mackey 1-0, S McLoughlin 1-0, M Roche 1-0, M Keating 0-2.	Referee: G Fitzgerald (Limerick)

7 February 1965	Clare	4-04 - 2-13	Cork	Cusack Park, Ennis
	P Cronin 2-1, M O'Shea 1-0, P McNamara 1-0, N Jordan 0-2, J Dunne 0-1.		J Bennett 0-6, J Redmond 1-1, W Carroll 1-0, N Gallagher 0-2, T O'Mahony 0-2, P Harte 0-1, J McCarthy 0-1.	Referee: A Higgins (Galway)

7 February 1965	Galway	0-09 - 4-12	Tipperary	Ballinasloe Sportsfield, Ballinasloe
	J Conroy 0-3, M Sweeney 0-3, M Carey 0-2, G Lohan 0-1.		D Nealon 1-2, M Keating 1-1, L Kiely 1-0, S Mackey 1-0, Jimmy Doyle 0-3, M Roche 0-2, L Devamey 0-2, T English 0-1, M Burns 0-1.	Referee: V Kelly (Offaly)

14 March 1965	Kilkenny	3-06 - 1-11	Cork	Nowlan Park, Kilkenny
	E Keher 1-4, T Walsh 1-1, S Buckley 1-0, P Carroll 0-1.		J Bennett 0-7, M Archer 1-0, C Roche 0-1, J McCarthy 0-1, T O'Mahony 0-1, W Carroll 0-1.	Referee: S Maddock (Wexford)

21 March 1965	Galway	4-04 - 3-05	Clare	Kenny Park, Athenry
	F Coffey 2-2, M Boyle 1-0, P Burns 1-0, G Lohan 0-1, M Carey 0-1.		P Cronin 1-2, P McNamara 1-0, L Danagher 1-0, J Dunne 0-2, H McCabe 0-1.	Referee: P Ryan (Tipperary)

4 April 1965	Tipperary	5-07 - 7-10	Kilkenny	Thurles Sportsfield, Thurles
	Jimmy Doyle 3-2, T English 1-1, S McLoughlin 1-0, D Nealon 0-1, M Burns 0-1, L Devaney 0-1, M Roche 0-1.		J Dunphy 3-0, T Walsh 2-3, E Keher 1-3, J Lynch 1-1, J Teehan 0-1, P Moran 0-1, T Forrestal 0-1.	Referee: A Higgins (Galway)

4 April 1965	Cork	1-09 - 1-03	Galway	Cork Athletic Grounds, Cork
	W Carroll 1-0, J McCarthy 0-2, J Bennett 0-2, N Gallagher 0-2, P Harte 0-2, D Murphy 0-1.		M Boyle 1-0, F Coffey 0-1, P Byrne 0-1, N Carey 0-1.

=== Group 1B table ===
Pos	Team	Pld	W	D	L	Pts	Notes
1	Waterford	4	4	0	0	8	
2	Wexford	4	3	0	1	6	
3	Limerick	3	1	0	2	2	
4	Dublin	4	1	0	3	2	
5	Carlow	3	0	0	3	0	

=== Group stage ===
11 October 1964	Limerick	6-10 - 1-06	Dublin	Gaelic Grounds, Limerick
	E Cregan 2-6, P Murphy 2-1, D Flynn 2-0, M Rainsford 1-0, B Hartigan 0-3.		M Keane 1-0, M Bermingham 0-3, F Whelan 0-2, P Fitzgerald 0-1.

25 October 1964	Wexford	2-08 - 1-07	Limerick	O'Kennedy Park, New Ross
	D Shannon 1-2, S Whelan 1-1, M Byrne 0-2, J Ormonde 0-1, O McGrath 0-1, P Lynch 0-1.		D Flynn 1-0, K Long 0-3, E Cregan 0-1, P Murphy 0-1, PJ Keane 0-1, M Hayes 0-1.	Referee: J Barron (Waterford)

25 October 1964	Dublin	3-15 - 3-07	Carlow	Croke Park, Dublin
	M Bermingham 1-7, K Crookes 1-2, A Boothman 0-5, J Keaveney 1-0, E Malone 0-1.		J McCarthy 2-0, L Walsh 1-1, T Collier 0-2, W Hogan 0-2, J Walsh 0-1, M O'Brien 0-1.	Referee: J Hatton (Wicklow)

8 November 1964	Waterford	2-13 - 3-08	Dublin	Walsh Park, Waterford
	P Grimes 0-6, T Cheasty 1-2, J Meaney 1-1, L Guinan 0-2, L Enright 0-1, J Flavin 0-1.		M Bermingham 1-5, B Galvin 2-1, C Leaney 0-1, P Maycock 0-1.	Referee: P Buggy (Kilkenny)

8 November 1964	Carlow	3-05 - 7-08	Wexford	Dr. Cullen Park, Carlow
	W Hogan 1-4, M McGree 1-1, T Walsh 1-0.		T Hawkins 3-2, D Shannon 3-0, M Byrne 1-5, J Ormonde 0-1.	Referee: D Roche (Waterford)

15 November 1964	Carlow	1-07 - 6-10	Waterford	Dr. Cullen Park, Carlow
	L Walsh 1-4, M McGree 0-1, M Morrissey 0-1, T Mitchell 0-1.		F Walsh 2-3, V Connors 2-0, J Flavin 2-0, T Cheasty 0-4, J O'Brien 0-2, C Ware 0-1.	Referee: P Maddock (Wexford)

14 March 1965	Wexford	2-06 - 4-05	Waterford	Wexford Park, Wexford
	O McGrath 1-2, P Lynch 1-0, M Byrne 0-2, R Shannon 0-1, J O'Brien 0-1.		S Power 2-0, M Flannelly 1-0, P Grimes 1-0, T Cheasty 0-1, M Morrissey 0-1, F Walsh 0-1, J O'Brien 0-1, J Meaney 0-1.	Referee: P Buggy (Kilkenny)

4 April 1965	Dublin	3-10 - 5-05	Wexford	Croke Park, Dublin
	K Crookes 2-0, M Bermingham 0-5, T Loughnane 1-0, D Foley 0-2, T McGrath 0-1, F Whelan 0-1, M Keane 0-1.		O McGrath 3-0, M Redmond 1-0, P Wilson 1-0, P Lynch 0-2, J O'Brien 0-1, V Staples 0-1, C Dowdall 0-1.	Referee: E Kelly (Laois)

4 April 1965	Waterford	1-09 - 1-06	Limerick	Fraher Field, Dungarvan
	P Grimes 0-5, M Flannelly 1-1, J O'Brien 0-1, F Walsh 0-1, T Cheasty 0-1.		P Murphy 1-1, E Cregan 0-2, B Hartigan 0-2, D Flynn 0-1.	Referee: P Cronin (Cork)

=== Knock-out stage ===
Semi-finals

2 May 1965 Semi-final	Kilkenny	5-09 - 1-03	Wexford	Croke Park, Dublin
	T Walsh 2-4, E Keher 1-3, T Forrestal 1-1, P Moran 1-0, S Cleere 0-1.		Joe Foley 1-0, P Lynch 0-2, J O'Brien 0-1.	Referee: A Higgins (Galway)

9 May 1965 Semi-final	Tipperary	2-18 - 1-09	Waterford	Croke Park, Dublin
	D Nealon 1-4, Jimmy Doyle 0-7, L Kiely 1-1, T English 0-2, J McKenna 0-2, M Burns 0-1, M Roche 0-1.		P Grimes 1-5, F Walsh 0-3, S Power 0-1.	Referee: G Fitzgerald (Limerick)

Home final

23 May 1965 Home final	Tipperary	3-14 - 2-08	Kilkenny	Croke Park, Dublin
	Jimmy Doyle 0-8, J McKenna 1-1, D Nealon 1-1, S McLoughlin 1-0, L Devaney 0-3, M Roche 0-1.		P Carroll 2-0, E Keher 0-4, T Walsh 0-2, J Lynch 0-1, P Moran 0-1.	Attendance: 41,345; Referee: A Higgins (Galway)

Finals

19 September 1965 First leg	Tipperary	4-10 - 2-11	New York	Gaelic Park, New York City
	Jimmy Doyle 2-3, J Loughlin 1-1, T Ryan 1-0, M Keating 0-2, D Nelaoin 0-1, T English 0-1, L Kiely 0-1.		J Donoghue 0-5, P Kirby 1-1, T Egan 1-0, M Curtin 0-2, P Dowling 0-2, B Hennessy 0-1.	Referee: S Power (Waterford)

26 September 1965 Second leg	Tipperary	2-09 - 3-09	New York	Gaelic Park, New York City
	Jimmy Doyle 0-8, D Nealon 1-0, T Ryan 1-0, M Roche 0-1.		J O'Donoghue 1-1, D Long 1-0, P Kirby 1-0, JJ Naughton 0-3, P Dowling 0-3, M Curtin 0-2.	Referee: S Power (Waterford)

Tipperary won 37–35 on aggregate.

=== Top scorers ===
Top scorers overall

Rank	Player	Club	Tally	Total	Matches	Average
1	Jimmy Doyle	Tipperary	7-42	63	8	7.87
2	Tom Walsh	Kilkenny	11-13	46	7	6.57
3	Mick Bermingham	Dublin	2-20	26	4	6.50
4	Eddie Keher	Kilkenny	3-16	25	6	4.16
5	Philly Grimes	Waterford	2-16	22	4	5.50
6	Donie Nealon	Tipperary	4-09	21	7	3.00
7	John Bennett	Cork	0-17	17	4	4.25
8	Dick Shannon	Wexford	4-03	15	4	3.75
8	Oliver McGrath	Wexford	4-03	15	4	3.75
8	Éamonn Cregan	Limerick	2-09	15	3	5.00

Top scorers in a single game

Rank	Player	Club	Tally	Total	Opposition
1	Tom Walsh	Kilkenny	4-00	12	Clare
1	Jimmy Doyle	Tipperary	2-06	12	Clare
1	Éamonn Cregan	Limerick	2-06	12	Dublin
2	Jimmy Doyle	Tipperary	3-02	11	Kilkenny
2	Tommy Hawkins	Wexford	3-02	11	Carlow
3	Tom Walsh	Kilkenny	2-04	10	Wexford
3	Mick Bermingham	Dublin	1-07	10	Carlow
4	Joe Dunphy	Kilkenny	3-00	9	Tipperary
4	Dick Shannon	Wexford	3-00	9	Carlow
4	Oliver McGrath	Wexford	3-00	9	Dublin
4	Tom Walsh	Kilkenny	2-03	9	Galway
4	Frankie Walsh	Waterford	2-03	9	Carlow
4	Tom Walsh	Kilkenny	2-03	9	Tipperary
4	Jimmy Doyle	Tipperary	2-03	9	New York

== Division 2 ==
National Hurling League Division 2
- Season: 1964-65
- Champions: Laois
- Matches played: 23
- All statistics correct as of 4 March 2017.

Westmeath came into the season as defending champions of the 1963-64 season.

On 17 May 1965, Laois won the title after a 3-14 to 3-4 win over Kerry in the final.

In spite of finishing at the bottom of their respective groups, neither Down or Kildare were relegated.

=== Group 2C table ===
Pos	Team	Pld	W	D	L	Pts	Notes
1	Westmeath	4	3	1	0	7	
2	Meath	4	2	1	1	5	
3	Roscommon	4	1	1	2	3	
4	Antrim	4	1	1	2	3	
5	Down	4	1	0	3	2	

=== Group 2D table ===
Pos	Team	Pld	W	D	L	Pts	Notes
1	Laois	4	4	0	0	8	Division 2 champions
2	Kerry	4	2	1	1	5	
3	Wicklow	4	2	0	2	4	
4	Offaly	4	1	1	2	3	
5	Kildare	4	0	0	4	0	

=== Knock-out stage ===
Semi-finals

11 April 1965 Semi-final	Laois	7-08 - 2-04	Meath	Croke Park, Dublin

25 April 1965 Semi-final	Kerry	2-05 - 2-05	Westmeath	Croke Park, Dublin

2 May 1965 Semi-final	Kerry	8-11 - 5-16 (aet)	Westmeath	MacDonagh Park, Nenagh

Final

17 May 1965 Final	Laois	3-14 - 3-04	Kerry	Croke Park, Dublin
				Referee: C Foley (Dublin)
