= Tom Walsh (Thomastown hurler) =

Irish hurler

Personal information
- Native name: Tomás Breathnach (Irish)
- Nickname: Blondie
- Born: 1944 (age 81–82) Thomastown, County Kilkenny, Ireland
- Occupation: Businessman
- Height: 5 ft 8 in (173 cm)

Sport
- Sport: Hurling
- Position: Centre-forward
Club
- Years: Club
- 1962-1967: Thomastown
Club titles
- Kilkenny titles: 0
Inter-county
- Years: County
- 1963-1967: Kilkenny
Inter-county titles
- Leinster titles: 4
- All-Irelands: 2
- NHL: 1
- All Stars: 0

Tom Walsh (born 1944 in Thomastown, County Kilkenny, Ireland) is an Irish former sportsperson. He played hurling with his local club Thomastown and was a member of the Kilkenny senior inter-county team from 1963 until 1967.

== Playing career ==
=== Club ===
Walsh played hurling with his local club in Thomastown and enjoyed some success during a brief playing career. He first came to prominence as a member of the Thomastown under-14 team in the 1950s. It was a glorious period of success at under-age level as the club won five under-14 championship titles in succession. Walsh was involved in four of these.

The sixties saw Walsh join the club's senior hurling team, however, he never won a senior county title.

=== Inter-county ===
Walsh first came to prominence on the inter-county scene as a member of the Kilkenny minor hurling team in the early 1960s. It was very successful period at under-age level for 'the Cats'.

By 1961 Walsh had established himself as a forward of note on the county's minor team. He won a Leinster title that year following a devastating 4-12 to 0-7 defeat of Dublin. The subsequent All-Ireland final pitted Kilkenny against Tipperary. Walsh was one of the main scorers that day, capturing 1-4 as 'the Cats' powered to a 3-13 to 0-15 win. It was Walsh's first All-Ireland minor winners' medal.

Walsh captured a second successive Leinster minor title in 1962 following a thrilling 5-7 to 5-4 defeat of Wexford. A second successive All-Ireland showdown with Tipperary followed. Walsh bagged 2-2 that day as Kilkenny triumphed by 3-6 to 0-9. It was his second All-Ireland minor title.

In 1963 Walsh was only nineteen years-old and fresh out of the minor grade when he joined the Kilkenny senior hurling team. That year he won his first Leinster title in the senior grade following a seven-point defeat of Dublin. Walsh later lined out in his first All-Ireland final in the senior grade. Waterford provided the opposition on that occasion and the men from the Déise looked to be cruising to victory. An eleven-point lead was cut down and Kilkenny went on to win the game with a remarkable score line of 4-17 to 6-8. Walsh had captured his first All-Ireland winners' medal.

The following year Walsh won a second Leinster title following another huge win over Dublin. Staunch local rivals Tipperary later provided the opposition in the All-Ireland final, however, Kilkenny were the pundits’ favourites to retain the title. Jimmy Doyle had other ideas, however, as he scored ten points and set up Seán McLoughlin for a goal. Tipperary’s fourteen-point winning margin, 5-13 to 2-8, was the biggest All-Ireland final win since Tipperary had overwhelmed Laois in the 1949 decider.

Kilkenny lost their provincial crown in 1965, however, the team bounced back in 1966 with Walsh collecting his first National Hurling League medal and a third Leinster title. This victory allowed Kilkenny to advance directly to the All-Ireland final where arch-rivals Cork provided the opposition. It was the first meeting of these two great sides since 1947 and ‘the Cats’ were installed as the firm favourites. In spite of this two goals by Colm Sheehan and a third from John O'Halloran gave Cork a merited 3-9 to 1-10 victory over an Eddie Keher-inspired Kilkenny.

1967 proved to be a life-changing year for Walsh. He began the year by picking up a fourth Leinster title before lining out in a fourth All-Ireland final at Croke Park. Tipperary were Kilkenny’s opponents on the day, however, by this stage Tipp’s pool of players was ageing and the county’s hurling fortunes were in decline. Walsh was charged with the task of marking Tony Wall and 'the Cats' proved more than a match for the Munster champions. Goals from Paddy Moran, Martin Brennan and Walsh gave Kilkenny a significant lead, however, with four minutes left in the game disaster struck. Walsh was struck in the face by Wall's hurley and fell to the ground. Blood was pouring out of his left eye and he had no choice but to leave the field. In his absence Kilkenny went on to win the game and laid to rest a bogey that Tipperary had over Kilkenny since 1922. Walsh was rushed to the Dublin eye and ear hospital where he immediately underwent surgery to remove his eye. He recovered from that horrific injury, however, the loss of his eye resulted in the end of a very promising hurling career.

=== Provincial ===
Walsh also lined out with Leinster in the inter-provincial hurling competition. He won one Railway Cup medal in 1967.
