= Ray Reidy =

Irish hurler

Personal information
- Native name: Réamonn Ó Riada (Irish)
- Born: 1937 Thurles, County Tipperary, Ireland
- Died: 10 June 2015 (aged 77–78) Curraheen, Cork, Ireland
- Occupation: Roman Catholic priest

Sport
- Sport: Hurling
- Position: Centre-back
Club
- Years: Club
- Thurles Sarsfields
Club titles
- Tipperary titles: 2
Inter-county
- Years: County
- 1956–1960: Tipperary
Inter-county titles
- Munster titles: 0
- All-Irelands: 0
- NHL: 0

Raymond Reidy (1937 – 10 June 2015) was an Irish hurler who played as centre-back for the Tipperary senior team.

Born in Thurles, County Tipperary, Reidy first played competitive hurling during his schooling at Thurles CBS. He arrived on the inter-county scene at the age of sixteen when he first linked up with the Tipperary minor team. He joined the senior panel during the 1956 championship. Reidy was a regular member of the team over the next few years and won one All-Ireland medal and one Munster medal as a non-playing substitute.

At club level Reidy was a two-time championship medallist with Thurles Sarsfields.

Reidy's retirement came following the conclusion of the 1960 championship.

In retirement from playing Reidy became involved in team management and coaching, serving as a selector with the Tipperary senior team.

== Playing career ==
=== Colleges ===
During his schooling at Thurles CBS, Reidy first came to prominence with the under-16 team. He won a Dean Ryan Cup medal in 1952 following a defeat of Dungarvan CBS.

=== Club ===
Reidy began his club hurling career by winning a minor championship medal with Rahealty in 1953 before transferring to Thurles Sarsfields where he enjoyed continued success by winning a further minor championship medal.

In 1955 Reidy joined the Thurles Sarsfields senior team, however, his studies for the priesthood impacted on his availability for key matches.

After missing Sarsfields's 1956 championship triumph, Reidy was included on the starting fifteen for the 1957 decider against Na Piarsaigh. A 4-15 to 4-4 victory secured a Tipperary Senior Hurling Championship medal for Reidy.

In 1959 Reidy won a second championship medal as Thurles Sarsfields defeated Kilruane MacDonagh's by 3-12 to 2-6.

=== Inter-county ===
Reidy joined the Tipperary minor hurling team in 1953. He won his first Munster medal that year following a 3-11 to 3-3 defeat of Limerick. The subsequent All-Ireland decider on 6 September 1953 saw Tipperary face Dublin. Goals proved vital for Tipperary who recorded an 8-6 to 3-6 victory, with Reidy collecting a first All-Ireland medal.

In 1954 Reidy added a second successive Munster medal to his collection following a 3-5 to 2-3 defeat of Limerick once again. Tipperary faced Dublin in the All-Ireland final for the second successive year on 5 September 1954. This time Dublin turned the tables and secured a 2-7 to 2-3 victory.

Reidy was appointed captain of the team in 1955 and won a third consecutive Munster medal following an 8–11 to 2–5 trouncing of Waterford. Reidy later appeared in a third successive All-Ireland final on 4 September 1955 with Galway providing the opposition. Tipperary easily won the game by 5–15 to 2–5 giving Reidy a second All-Ireland medal.

Reidy joined the Tipperary senior team in 1956, however, his studies for the priesthood hindered his inter-county career. In spite of this he played a number of league and championship games over the course of the next few years.

In 1958 Reidy won a Munster medal as a non-playing substitute as Tipperary regained the provincial crown following a 4–12 to 1–5 trouncing of reigning champions Waterford. Tipperary later defeated Kilkenny in the All-Ireland semi-final before lining out against Galway in the All-Ireland decider on 7 September 1958. Galway got a bye into the final without picking up a hurley. Liam Devaney, Donie Nealon and Larry Keane all scored goals for Tipperary in the first-half, while Tony Wall sent a seventy-yard free untouched to the Galway net. Tipperary won the game by 4–9 to 2–5 giving Reidy, who was a member of the substitutes, an All-Ireland medal.

Reidy remained on and off the Tipperary panel until 1960 when he brought the curtain down on his inert-county career.

== Personal life ==
Reidy was born in Thurles in 1937 and educated at Thurles CBS before studying at St. Patrick's Missionary Society. Reidy was ordained a priest in 1963. From there he went on the missions to Africa, spending more than twenty years in Nigeria and Kenya.

Upon his return to Ireland he served in many parishes in the Diocese of Waterford and Lismore including Kilsheelan, Cahir and Passage East before he came to Clonmel.

== Death ==
Reidy died on 10 June 2015 after a short illness.

== Honours ==
=== Team ===
Thurles CBS

- Dean Ryan Cup: 1952

Rahealty

- Tipperary Minor Hurling Championship (1): 1953

Thurles Sarsfields

- Tipperary Senior Hurling Championship (2): 1956, 1959

Tipperary

- All-Ireland Senior Hurling Championship (1): 1958 (sub)
- Munster Senior Hurling Championship (1): 1958 (sub)
- All-Ireland Minor Hurling Championship (2): 1953, 1955 (c)
- Munster Minor Hurling Championship (3): 1953, 1954, 1955 (c)

Sporting positions
Preceded by Billy Quinn	Tipperary Minor Hurling Captain; 1955	Succeeded by Pat Ryan
Achievements
Preceded by Bernie Boothman (Dublin)	All-Ireland Minor Hurling Final winning captain 1955	Succeeded by Pat Ryan (Tipperary)
