= Mick Kennedy (Dublin hurler) =

Irish hurler (1935–2025)

Personal information
- Native name: Mícheál Ó Cinnéide (Irish)
- Born: 1935 Clonmel, County Tipperary, Ireland
- Died: 9 January 2025 (aged 89) Whitehall, Dublin, Ireland

Sport
- Sport: Hurling
- Position: Midfield
Clubs
- Years: Club
- St Mary's Clonmel; Clonmel Commercials; Marlfield → Na Piarsaigh; Faughs
Club titles
- Dublin titles: 3
Inter-county
- Years: County
- 1955 1959-1963: Tipperary (SF); Dublin (SH)
Inter-county titles
- Leinster titles: 1
- All-Irelands: 0
- NHL: 0

Michael Kennedy (1935 – 9 January 2025) was an Irish hurler and Gaelic footballer. At club level, he played with St Mary's Clonmel, Clonmel Commercials, Marlfield and Faughs and was also a member of the Dublin senior hurling team.

== Playing career ==
Kennedy first played hurling and Gaelic football with various clubs in his home town of Clonmel. He won a South Tipperary MHC medal with St Mary's in 1953, before claiming a Tipperary SFC medal with Clonmel Commercials in 1956. That year, Kennedy transferred his hurling allegiance to the Marlfield club. He was part of a South Tipperary hurling combination team named, Na Piarsaigh, that was beaten by Thurles Sarsfields in the 1957 SHC final.

At inter-county level, Kennedy first played for Tipperary as a dual player at minor level in 1953. He won a Munster MHC medal the following year before partnering Billy Quinn at midfield when Tipperary beat Dublin by 8-06 to 3-06 in the 1953 All-Ireland minor final. Kennedy later joined the Tipperary senior football team, while he also lined out at junior level.

Kennedy joined the Dublin senior hurling team during the 1959-60 league. He won a Leinster SHC medal as a substitute in 1961. He was also listed amongst the substitutes when Dublin were beaten by Tipperary in the 1961 All-Ireland final. Kennedy was the first player to score in a live televised GAA match, when he scored the opening point in the 1962 Railway Cup final, playing for Leinster in their win over Munster.

After his inter-county career ended, Kennedy continued to play with the Faughs club. He won three Dublin SHC medals between 1970 and 1973.

== Management career ==
Kennedy first became involved in inter-county management when he became a Dublin senior hurling team selector as part of Lar Foley's management team in September 1988. He spent five years in this role, during which time Dublin reached consecutive Leinster finals in 1990 and 1991 but lost on both occasions.

== Death ==
Kennedy died in Whitehall, Dublin on 9 January 2025, at the age of 89.

== Honours ==
St Mary's Clonmel

- South Tipperary Minor Hurling Championship (1): 1953

Marlfield

- South Tipperary Junior Hurling Championship (1): 1954

Clonmel Commercial

- Tipperary Senior Football Championship (1): 1956

Faughs

- Dublin Senior Hurling Championship: 1970, 1972, 1973

Tipperary

- All-Ireland Minor Hurling Championship (1): 1953
- Munster Minor Hurling Championship (1): 1953

Dublin

- Leinster Senior Hurling Championship (1): 1961

Leinster

- Railway Cup: 1962
