= Bernie Boothman =

Dublin hurler

Personal information
- Native name: Bearnard Bútman (Irish)
- Born: 1936 (age 89–90) Dublin, Ireland
- Occupation: Van driver
- Height: 5 ft 8 in (173 cm)

Sport
- Sport: Hurling
- Position: Right corner-forward
Clubs
- Years: Club
- St Finbarr's; St Columba's
Club titles
- Dublin titles: 1
Inter-county
- Years: County
- 1955 1956–1966: Warwickshire; Dublin
Inter-county titles
- Leinster titles: 1
- All-Irelands: 0
- NHL: 0

Bernard Boothman (born 1936) is an Irish former hurler. At club level, he played with St Columba's and at inter-county level was a member of the Dublin senior hurling team.

== Playing career ==
Boothman first played hurling at club level with St Columba's. After emigrating to England he joined the St Finbarr's club in Coventry and won a Warwickshire SHC medal in 1955. Boothman returned to St Columba's the following year and was part of the club's first ever Dublin SHC success.

At inter-county level, Shannon first played for Dublin at minor level. He won three successive Leinster MHC medals before captaining the team to a 2–7 to 2–3 defeat of Tipperary in the 1954 All-Ireland MHC final. At adult level, Boothman played with the Warwickshire team beaten by Cork in the 1955 All-Ireland JHC final.

After returning to Ireland, Boothman made his Dublin senior hurling team debut in 1956 and quickly became a regular. He won a Leinster SHC medal in 1961 following Dublin's first provincial success in nine years. Boothman was at corner-forward when Dublin were beaten by Tipperary in the 1961 All-Ireland final.

== Personal life ==
His brother, Achille Boothman, also played hurling with St Columba's, Dublin and Leinster. Married Maura Fitzgerald. Had five children Helen,Paul, Kathleen, Anthony, Annmarie

== Honours ==
St Finbarr's

- Warwickshire Senior Hurling Championship: 1955

St Columba's

- Dublin Senior Hurling Championship: 1956

Dublin

- Leinster Senior Hurling Championship: 1961
- All-Ireland Minor Hurling Championship: 1954 (c)
- Leinster Minor Hurling Championship: 1952, 1953, 1954 (c)

Sporting positions
Preceded by	Dublin minor hurling team captain 1954	Succeeded by
Achievements
Preceded by Billy Quinn	All-Ireland MHC winning captain 1954	Succeeded by Ray Reidy
