= Devaney =

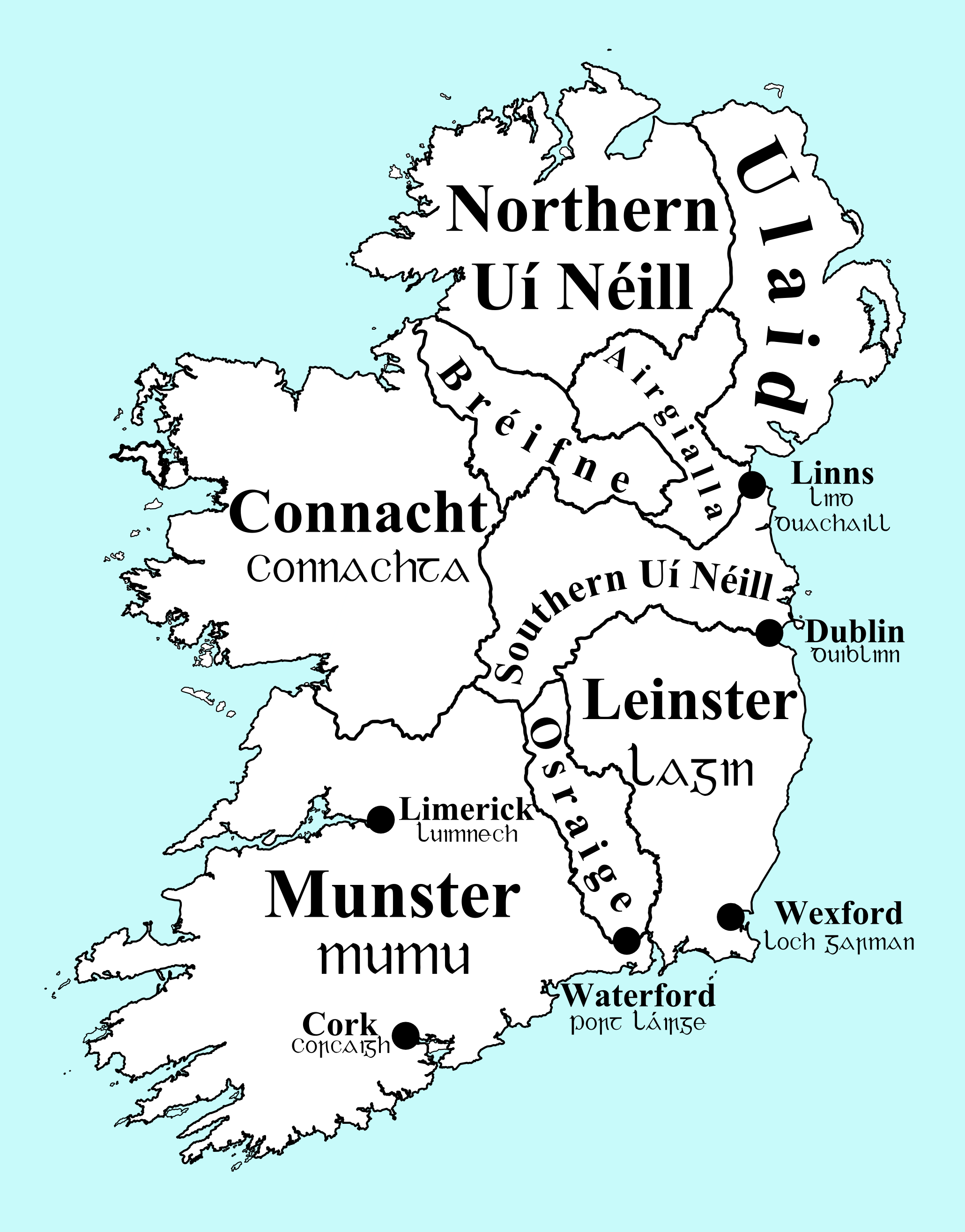
Map of Gaelic Ireland showing the territory of the over-kingdom of Ulaid circa 900 A.D.

Devaney, Devany, and O'Devaney are surnames derived from the Irish Ó/Mac Duibheamhna, meaning "descendants/son of Dubheamhna". They are cited by O'Dugan as being chiefs of Kinelawley in the over-kingdom of Ulaid, now known as Clanawley in present-day County Down, Northern Ireland.

Ó Duibheamhna derives from a personal name based on the Irish word dubh, meaning "black", and the genitive of Eamhain, the Irish name for Navan fort located in County Armagh, Northern Ireland. It was the former capital of Ulaid. Another family/clan was based in the diocese of Raphoe, in Donegal, Republic of Ireland, and may be a distinct branch.

The surname was considered obsolete by Woulfe in 1923 and changed into some other English or Irish form.

Devaney may refer to:

- Aidan Devaney, Sligo Gaelic football goalkeeper
- Arthur De Vany (born 1937), American economist
- Billy Devaney (born 1955), American football executive
- Bob Devaney (1915–1997), American football coach
- Charlotte Devaney (born 1988), British DJ
- Chris Devaney, state Republican Party chairman
- Earl Devaney (1947–2022), American government official
- Francis Devaney (born 1984), Irish hurling champion
- James Devaney (1890–1976), Australian poet
- Jim Devaney (1907–1987), Irish hurler
- John Devaney (ice hockey) (born 1958), Canadian ice hockey player
- John Devaney (businessman) (1946–2018), British businessman
- John P. Devaney (1883–1941), American judge
- June Anne Devaney, (1944–1948), English murder victim
- Liam Devaney (1935–2017), Irish hurling champion
- Marjorie Devaney (1931–2007), American computer programmer
- Martin Devaney (born 1980), English footballer
- Michael Devaney (racing driver) (born 1984), Irish racing driver
- Michael Aloysius Devaney (1891–1967), American track and field athlete
- Michael S. Devany, American admiral
- Patricia DeVaney (born 1968), American judge
- Pauline Devaney (born 1937), British actress
- Phil Devaney (born 1969), English footballer
- Robert L. Devaney (1948–2025), American mathematician
- Sue Devaney (born 1967), English actress
- Theo Devaney (born 1984), English actor
- Thomas Devaney (born 1969), American poet
- Tom Devaney (died 1976), American mobster
