= Larry Shannon (hurler) =

Irish hurler

Personal information
- Native name: Labhrás Ó Seanáin (Irish)
- Born: 1936 (age 89–90) Dublin, Ireland
- Height: 5 ft 9 in (175 cm)

Sport
- Sport: Hurling
- Position: Left wing-forward
Club
- Years: Club
- Scoil Uí Chonaill
Club titles
- Dublin titles: 0
Inter-county
- Years: County
- 1958–1964: Dublin
Inter-county titles
- Leinster titles: 1
- All-Irelands: 0
- NHL: 0

Lawrence J. J. Shannon (born 1936) is an Irish former hurler. At club level, he played with Scoil Uí Chonaill and at inter-county level was a member of the Dublin senior hurling team.

== Playing career ==
Shannon first played hurling to a high standard as a student at O'Connell School and lined out in the Leinster Colleges SHC. At club level, he played with Scoil Uí Chonaill and was part of the team that won the Dublin JHC title in 1958, before claiming the Dublin IHC in 1959.

At inter-county level, Shannon first played for Dublin at minor level and was a substitute when the team beat Tipperary in the 1954 All-Ireland minor final. He later spent two years with the junior team. Shannon made his senior team debut in the Walsh Cup in 1958. He won a Leinster SHC medal in 1961 following Dublin's first provincial success in nine years. Shannon was at wing-forward when Dublin were beaten by Tipperary in the 1961 All-Ireland final.

Shannon also earned selection to the Leinster inter-provincial team. He won a Railway Cup medal in 1962 following Leinster's 1-11 to 1-09 defeat of Munster in the final.

== Honours ==
Scoil Uí Chonaill

- Dublin Intermediate Hurling Championship: 1959
- Dublin Junior Hurling Championship: 1958

Dublin

- Leinster Senior Hurling Championship: 1961
- All-Ireland Minor Hurling Championship: 1954
- Leinster Minor Hurling Championship: 1954

Leinster

- Railway Cup: 1962
