= Rody Nealon =

Irish hurler and Gaelic games administrator

Personal information
- Native name: Ruairí Ó Nialláin (Irish)
- Nickname: Rody
- Born: 16 January 1898 Newtown, County Tipperary, Ireland
- Died: 29 November 1988 (aged 90) Newtown, County Tipperary, Ireland
- Occupation: National school teacher

Sport
- Sport: Hurling
- Position: Centre-forward
Clubs
- Years: Club
- De La Salle; Mullinavat; Youghalarra
Club titles
- Tipperary titles: 0
Inter-county
- Years: County
- 1918 1922 1925-1926: Waterford; Kilkenny; Tipperary
Inter-county titles
- Munster titles: 0
- All-Irelands: 1

Rhoderick Nealon (16 January 1898 – 29 November 1988) was an Irish hurler and Gaelic games administrator. His championship career with the Waterford, Kilkenny and Tipperary senior teams lasted from 1918 until 1925.

Born in Newtown, County Tipperary, Nealon first played competitive hurling in his youth. He was educated at De La Salle College in Waterford where he featured prominently on the college hurling team.

Nealon enjoyed a lengthy career with a variety of clubs, including De La Salle in Waterford, Mullinavat in Kilkenny and his home club of Youghalarra. With the latter he won a North Tipperary junior championship medal in 1931.

As a student teacher in 1918, Nealon made his senior championship debut when he lined out with Waterford in their defeat by Limerick. Four years later he was included on the Kilkenny senior team. A return to his home county saw him selected for the Tipperary junior team in 1923. His two seasons with the team yielded an All-Ireland medal in 1924. Nealon's success with the junior team lead to his inclusion on the senior team and he won an All-Ireland medal in that grade in 1925.

At the age of 26, Nealon became chairman of the North Tipperary GAA Board for a two-year term. He later served as chairman and secretary of the Burgess club at different times, while he was also a member of the Tipperary County Board and the Munster Council.

Nealon's son, Donie, won five All-Ireland medals between 1958 and 1965 and his grandson, Seán, won an All-Ireland medal in 1991.

== Honours ==
Youghalarra

- North Tipperary Junior Hurling Championship (1): 1931

Tipperary

- All-Ireland Senior Hurling Championship (1): 1925
- All-Ireland Junior Hurling Championship (1): 1924
- Munster Junior Hurling Championship (1): 1924
