= Liam Devaney =

Irish hurler (1935–2017)

Personal information
- Native name: Liam Ó Ó Dubhánaigh (Irish)
- Born: 1935 Borrisoleigh, County Tipperary, Ireland
- Died: 15 August 2017 (aged 82) Borrisoleigh, County Tipperary, Ireland
- Occupation: Salesman
- Height: 5 ft 8 in (173 cm)

Sport
- Sport: Hurling
- Position: Forward
Club
- Years: Club
- 1952–1974: Borris–Ileigh
Club titles
- Tipperary titles: 1
Inter-county
- Years: County
- 1954–1968: Tipperary
Inter-county titles
- Munster titles: 8
- All-Irelands: 5
- NHL: 8

Liam Devaney (1935 – 15 August 2017) was an Irish hurler. His league and championship career with the Tipperary senior team spanned fourteen seasons from 1954 until 1968.

Born in Borrisoleigh, County Tipperary, Devaney was born into a strong hurling family. His father, Jim Devaney, was a stalwart of the Borris–Ileigh club and was a member of the Tipperary senior panel that won the All-Ireland title in 1937.

Devaney first came to prominence as a hurler at underage levels with the Borris-Ileigh club before making his debut with the club's adult team in 1952. In a 22-year club career he won a county senior championship medal in 1953, as well as four divisional senior championship medals.

Devaney made his debut on the inter-county scene at the age of sixteen when he was selected for the Tipperary minor team. He enjoyed two undefeated championship seasons in this grade, winning back-to-back All-Ireland medals in 1952 and 1953. He was added to the Tipperary senior panel during the 1954 championship before making his debut during the 1954-55 league. Over the course of the following fourteen seasons Devaney became one of Tipperary's most versatile players and won five All-Ireland medals, beginning with a lone triumph in 1958, followed by four championships in five seasons between 1961 and 1965. He also won eight Munster medals, eight National Hurling League medals and was named Hurler of the Year in 1961. He played his last game for Tipperary in October 1968 and played senior hurling for Tipperary in every position except full back.

After being chosen on the Munster inter-provincial team for the first time in 1956, Devaney subsequently became an automatic choice on the starting fifteen between 1961 and 1966. During that time he won three Railway Cup medals.

== Playing career ==
=== Club ===
Devaney played his club hurling with Borris–Ileigh and enjoyed much success in a career that spanned three decades. He made his senior championship debut in 1952 at a time when the club's first great era was coming to an end. In spite of this, Devaney won a county senior championship medal in 1953, following a 4-8 to 4-4 defeat of Boherlahan. He also won four divisional senior championship medals between 1952 and 1972, before retiring from club hurling in 1974.

=== Minor ===
After having his presence requested for trials for the Tipperary minor team in early 1952, Devaney was an automatic choice at right wing-forward for the subsequent championship campaign. Tipperary won each of their three provincial games with ease, with Devaney winning his first Munster medal following a 10-7 to 1-2 defeat of Clare in the final. The subsequent All-Ireland series provided little difficulty for Tipperary, with the team scoring 18 goals in their games against Galway and Dublin. The 9-9 to 2-6 defeat of Dublin in the decider gave Devaney his first All-Ireland medal.

Devaney was eligible for the minor grade once again in 1953, with Tipperary dominating the championship for the second successive season. After an impressive provincial campaign, Devaney won a second Munster medal following a 3-11 to 3-3 defeat of Limerick. For the second year in succession, Dublin provided the opposition in the All-Ireland final. Tipperary completely outclassed the Metropolitan once again, and an 8-6 to 3-6 victory gave Devaney a second All-Ireland medal.

=== Senior ===
==== Early successes ====
After being a substitute on the Tipperary senior team for the 1954 championship, Devaney made his senior debut during the 1954-55 league, a campaign which saw Tipperary face Wexford in the final. Wexford's preparation for the game was affected by the death of Bob Rackard, father of the legendary brothers Nicky, Bobby and Billy, who had all withdrawn from the match. Tiperary won the game by 3-5 to 1-5, with Devaney claiming his first league medal. He added a second league medal to his collection in 1957 following a defeat of Kilkenny, however, Devaney was still waiting for championship success.

In 1958 Devaney won his first Munster medal from the substitutes' bench as Tipperary regained the provincial crown following a 4-12 to 1-5 trouncing of reigning champions Waterford. Tipperary later defeated Kilkenny in the All-Ireland semi-final before lining out against Galway in the All-Ireland decider on 7 September 1958. Galway got a bye into the final without picking up a hurley. Devaney, Donie Nealon and Larry Keane all scored goals for Tipperary in the first-half, while Tony Wall sent a seventy-yard free untouched to the Galway net. Tipperary won the game by 4-9 to 2-5 giving Devaney his first All-Ireland medal.

Devaney won a third National League medal in 1959 following a 0-15 to 0-7 defeat of Waterford, however, Tipperary subsequently surrendered their provincial and All-Ireland crowns.

Tipperary asserted their dominance in 1960 by retaining the National League title with a 2-15 to 3-8 defeat of Cork. It was Devaney's fourth winners' medal in that competition. He later won a second Munster medal - his first on the field of play - following a narrow 4-13 to 4-11 defeat of Cork in what has been described as the toughest game of hurling ever played. This victory allowed Tipperary to advance directly to an All-Ireland final meeting with Wexford on 4 September 1960. A certain amount of over-confidence was obvious in the Tipperary camp, particularly in trainer Phil Purcell's comment that no player was capable of marking Jimmy Doyle. The game ended in remarkable circumstances as the crowd invaded the pitch with a minute to go, mistaking the referee's whistle for the end of the game. When the crowd were finally moved off the pitch Tipperary continued playing with only twelve men, but Wexford won on a score line of 2-15 to 0-11.

==== Total dominance ====
1961 saw Devaney collect a fifth National League medal following a 6-6 to 4-9 defeat of Waterford. He later added a third Munster medal to his collection, as old rivals Cork were downed by 3-6 to 0-7. The absence of the All-Ireland semi-final allowed Tipperary to advance directly to the final itself, with Dublin's first native hurling team providing the opposition on 3 September 1961. The game was a close run thing, however, Tipperary held on to win by 0-16 to 1-12. It was Devaney's second All-Ireland medal. He ended the year by being named Caltex Hurler of the Year.

In 1962 Tipperary were still the kingpins of Munster. A 5-14 to 2-3 trouncing of Waterford in the decider gave Devaney a fourth Munster medal. Tipperary's nemesis of two years earlier, Wexford, waited in Croke Park to test them once again in the subsequent All-Ireland final on 2 September 1962. Wexford, however, were not the force of old and the side got off to possibly the worst start ever by a team in a championship decider. After just ninety seconds the Leinster champions were down by two goals, however, the game turned out to be much closer than people expected. Tipperary eventually secured the win on a score line of 3-10 to 2-11, giving Devaney a third All-Ireland medal.

After losing the following year's Munster final to Waterford in one of the hurling shocks of the decade, Tipperary bounced back in 1964 with Devaney collecting a sixth National League medal. Tipperary later cantered casually past Cork by fourteen points in the provincial decider, giving Devaney a fifth Munster medal, albeit from the substitutes' bench. The All-Ireland final on 6 September 1964 saw Kilkenny enter the game as firm favourites against Devaney's side. John "Mackey" McKenna scored Tipperary's first goal after ten minutes as the Munster champions took a 1-8 to 0-6 interval lead. The second half saw Tipperary score goals for fun, with Donie Nealon getting a hat-trick and Seán McLoughlin another. Kilkenny were humiliated at the full-time whistle as Tipperary triumphed by 5-13 to 2-8. It was Devaney's fourth All-Ireland medal.

In 1965 Devaney won a sixth National League medal as New York were narrowly defeated on an aggregate score of 6-19 to 5-20. Tipperary demolished all opposition in the provincial championship once again and a 4-11 to 0-5 trouncing of Cork gave Devaney a sixth Munster medal. Wexford were Tipperary's opponents in the subsequent All-Ireland final on 5 September 1965, however, the game failed to live up to the two classic games between the two sides in 1960 and 1962. Victory went to Tipperary on that occasion by 2-16 to 0-10, courtesy of a brace of goals by Seán McLoughlin. The win gave Devaney a fifth All-Ireland medal.

==== Decline ====
After surrendering their provincial crown in 1966, Tipperary bounced back the following year, with Devaney winning a seventh Munster medal following a 4-12 to 2-6 defeat of Clare. 3 September 1967 saw Kilkenny face Tipperary in the All-Ireland decider, and Devaney's side looked like continuing their hoodoo over their near rivals as they took a 2-6 to 1-3 lead at half-time. Goalkeeper Ollie Walsh was the hero for Kilkenny as he made a series of spectacular saves, however, the team lost Eddie Keher and Tom Walsh to injury in the second half. In spite of this, Kilkenny laid to rest a bogey that Tipperary had over the team since 1922, and a 3-8 to 2-7 victory resulted in defeat for Devaney's team.

Devaney won an eighth National League medal as a member of the panel in 1968 as New York were defeated on an aggregate score of 6–27 to 4–22. Tipperary retained their status as provincial kingpins once again and a 2–13 to 1–7 trouncing of Cork gave Devaney an eighth Munster medal. For the fourth time of the decade, Wexford were Tipperary's opponents in the subsequent All-Ireland final on 1 September 1968. At half-time it looked as if Tipperary were cruising to another victory as they took an eight-point lead. Just after the restart Wexford had a Christy Jacob goal disallowed before Tony Doran scored a goal after just six minutes. Tipperary fought back, however, it was too late as Wexford won by 5–8 to 3–12. In spite of this setback, Devaney finished the year with a sixth Oireachtas Cup medal following a narrow 1-9 to 1-6 defeat of Cork, before retiring from inter-county hurling.

=== Inter-provincial ===
Devaney also lined out with Munster in the inter-provincial hurling competition. He captured Railway Cup titles in 1961, 1963 and 1966.

== Personal life ==
Devaney was born to Jim and Josie Devaney (née McShery) in Borrisoleigh, County Tipperary in 1935. He was educated locally and later worked as a salesman with Killough Quarries.

Devaney died on 15 August 2017 at the age of 82 after a short illness. He was survived by his wife Hannie and six children.

== Honours ==
Borris–Ileigh

- Tipperary Senior Hurling Championship (1): 1953
- North Tipperary Senior Hurling Championship (4): 1953, 1955, 1972, 1973

Tipperary

- All-Ireland Senior Hurling Championship (5): 1958, 1961, 1962, 1964, 1965
- Munster Senior Hurling Championship (8): 1958, 1960, 1961, 1962, 1964, 1965, 1967, 1968
- National Hurling League: (8) 1954-55, 1956-57, 1958-59, 1959-60, 1960-61, 1963-64, 1964-65, 1967-68
- Oireachtas Cup (6): 1960, 1961, 1963, 1964, 1965, 1968
- All-Ireland Minor Hurling Championship (2): 1952, 1953
- Munster Minor Hurling Championship (2): 1952, 1953

Munster

- Railway Cup (3): 1961, 1963, 1966

Individual

- Caltex Hurler of the Year (1): 1961
- Cú Chulainn Award (1): 1963
- Knocknagow Award: 2015

Awards
Preceded by Nick O'Donnell (Wexford)	Caltex Hurler of the Year; 1961	Succeeded by Donie Nealon (Tipperary)
