= John Devaney =

John Devaney may refer to:

- John Devaney (businessman) (1946–2018), British businessman
- John P. Devaney (1883–1941), Chief Justice of the Minnesota Supreme Court
- John Devaney (ice hockey) (1958–2024), Canadian ice hockey player
- John P. Devaney (fireboat), an FDNY fireboat named in honor of a firefighter who died on the job
