= Shane Maher =

Irish hurler and Gaelic footballer

Personal information
- Native name: Seán Ó Meagher (Irish)
- Born: 22 April 1981 (age 45) Gortmore, County Tipperary
- Occupation: Stryker Limerick Employee
- Height: 6 ft 0 in (183 cm)

Sport
- Sport: Hurling
- Position: Half-back
Club
- Years: Club
- Burgess
Inter-county
Years	County	Apps (scores)
2004-2012 2003	Tipperary (H); Tipperary (F)	6 (0-1); 4
Inter-county titles
- Munster titles: 2
- All-Irelands: 1
- NHL: 1

Shane Maher (born 22 April 1981 in Gortmore, County Tipperary) is an Irish sportsperson. He plays hurling with his local club Burgess and with the Tipperary senior inter-county team. He is the older brother of Donagh Maher, who also plays for Tipperary.

== Playing career ==
=== Club ===
Maher plays his club hurling with his local Burgess club and has enjoyed some success. He was a key member of the team when the club won the intermediate county title in 2005.

=== Inter-county ===
Shane is a talented hurler and footballer and has lined out with Tipperary at Minor Football (1998 and 1999), Under 21 Football (2000, 2001 and 2002 as captain), Under 21 Hurling (2002), Junior Football (2001), Intermediate Hurling (2002, 2003 and 2004), and Senior Football (2003). Shane made his Senior Hurling competitive debut at centre-forward for Tipperary against Offaly in the 2004 National Hurling League.

Maher first came to prominence on the inter-county scene as a member of the Tipperary intermediate hurling team in the early 2000s. He enjoyed some success in this grade, culminating in the winning of a Munster title in 2002. Two years later in 2004, Maher was a member of the Tipp senior panel and made his debut against Offaly in the National Hurling League. He did not feature on the Tipperary panel in 2005 and 2006, but was recalled to the squad in 2007, making his championship debut against Dublin at left half-back in the 2007 qualifier series of games. That particular season was an unhappy one for Tipp. A new manager in 2008 brought a change of fortune as Maher collected a National League title in 2008.

On 5 September 2010, Maher was a non-playing substitute as Tipperary won their 26th All Ireland title, beating reigning champions Killkenny by 4–17 to 1–18 in the final, preventing Kilkenny from achieving an historic 5-in-a-row; it was Maher's first All-Ireland winners medal.
