= Billy Quinn (hurler) =

Irish hurler (1935–2016)

Personal information
- Native name: Liam Ó Coinn (Irish)
- Born: 5 October 1935 Rahealty, County Tipperary, Ireland
- Died: 17 January 2016 (aged 80)
- Occupation: Factory worker

Sport
- Sport: Hurling
- Position: Midfield
Clubs
- Years: Club
- Rahealty; Faughs
Inter-county
- Years: County
- 1953–1956 1960: Tipperary; Dublin
Inter-county titles
- Munster titles: 0
- All-Irelands: 0
- NHL: 1

William Quinn (5 October 1935 – 17 January 2016) was an Irish hurler who played as a midfielder for the Tipperary and Dublin senior teams.

Quinn made his first appearance for the Tipperary team during the 1953–54 National League and was a regular member of the starting fifteen until he was dropped from the panel after the 1956 championship. He subsequently lined out with Dublin for one season. During that time he won one National Hurling League medal.

At club level Quinn began his career with Rahealty before playing with Faughs.

His son, Niall Quinn, is a former professional association footballer who played for English Premier League teams Arsenal, Manchester City and Sunderland and received 92 caps for the Republic of Ireland national football team.

== Playing career ==
=== Inter-county ===
Quinn first came to prominence on the inter-county scene as a member of the Tipperary minor hurling team in 1951. Tipperary lost their provincial title to Cork.

In 1952 Quinn won his first Munster medal following a 10-7 to 1-3 trouncing of Clare. Tipperary subsequently reached the All-Ireland final. Dublin provided the opposition on that occasion, however, Tipperary trounced the Metropolitans by 9-9 to 2-3 giving Quinn an All-Ireland Minor Hurling Championship medal in the minor grade.

Quinn was appointed captain of the Tipperary minor team for 1953. He collected a second Munster medal that year when Tipperary beat Limerick by 3-11 to 3-3. The All-Ireland final saw Quinn's side defeat Dublin by 8-6 to 3-6. It was a second successive All-Ireland medal for Quinn while he also had the honour of collecting the cup.

Having finished with the Tipperary minor team in 1953, Quinn subsequently joined the Tipperary senior team. He won a National Hurling League medal in 1954 following a 3-10 to 1-4 defeat of Kilkenny. Championship success eluded Tipperary over the next few years and, following a Munster semi-final defeat by Cork in 1956, Quinn was dropped from the panel.

A move from London back to Ireland in the late 1950s saw Quinn line out with Dublin. A change of rules saw non-Dublin players dropped from the team shortly afterwards.

=== Inter-provincial ===
Quinn also lined out with Leinster in the inter-provincial series of games.

== Death ==
Quinn's death at the age of 80 was announced on 17 January 2016.

== Honours ==
Tipperary

- National Hurling League: (1) 1953–54
- All-Ireland Minor Hurling Championship (2): 1952, 1953 (c)
- Munster Minor Hurling Championship (2): 1952, 1953 (c)

Sporting positions
Preceded by Tony Wall	Tipperary Minor Hurling Captain; 1953	Succeeded by Liam Quinn
Achievements
Preceded by Tony Wall (Tipperary)	All-Ireland Minor Hurling Final winning captain 1953	Succeeded by Bernie Boothman (Dublin)
