= Shay Lynch =

Irish hurler (born 1941)

Séamus Lynch (born February 1941) is an Irish retired hurler who played as a left wing-back for club side St. Vincent's and at inter-county level with the Dublin senior hurling team.

== Honours ==
Dublin

- Leinster Senior Hurling Championship (1): 1961
