= List of Interprovincial Hurling Championship finals =

== Hurling Roll of Honour ==
| Province | Wins | Winning years |
|---|---|---|
| Munster | 46 | 1928, 1929, 1930, 1931, 1934, 1937, 1938, 1939, 1940, 1942, 1943, 1944, 1945, 1946, 1948, 1949, 1950, 1951, 1952, 1953, 1955, 1957, 1958, 1959, 1960, 1961, 1963, 1966, 1968, 1969, 1970, 1976, 1978, 1981, 1984, 1985, 1992, 1995, 1996, 1997, 2000, 2001, 2005, 2007, 2013, 2016 |
| Leinster | 29 | 1927, 1932, 1933, 1935, 1936, 1941, 1954, 1956, 1962, 1964, 1965, 1967, 1971, 1972, 1973, 1974, 1975, 1977, 1979, 1988, 1993, 1998, 2002, 2003, 2006, 2008, 2009, 2012, 2014 |
| Connacht | 11 | 1947, 1980, 1982, 1983, 1986, 1987, 1989, 1991, 1994, 1999, 2004 |
| Ulster | 0 | Second place: 1945, 1992, 1993, 1995 |

The teams listed below are those which took part in the Interprovincial Hurling Championship Final (formerly the Railway Cup Final) in the year listed.

| Year | Winner | Score | Runner-up | Score | Venue | Winning Captain |
|---|---|---|---|---|---|---|
| 1927 | Leinster | 1–11 | Munster | 2–6 | Croke Park | Wattie Dunphy |
| 1928 | Munster | 2–2 | Leinster | 1–2 | Croke Park | Seán Óg Murphy |
| 1929 | Munster | 5–3 | Leinster | 3–1 | Croke Park | Seán Óg Murphy |
| 1930 | Munster | 4–6 | Leinster | 2–7 | Croke Park | Dinny Barry-Murphy |
| 1931 | Munster | 1–12 | Leinster | 2–6 | Croke Park | Philip Purcell |
| 1932 | Leinster | 6–8 | Munster | 4–4 | Croke Park | Jim Dermody |
| 1933 | Leinster | 4–6 | Munster | 3–6 | Croke Park | Eddie Doyle |
| 1934 | Munster | 6–3 | Leinster | 3–2 | Croke Park | Timmy Ryan |
| 1935 | Leinster | 2-9 | Munster | 0-7 | Croke Park |
| 1936 | Leinster | 2–8 | Munster | 3–4 | Croke Park | Paddy Larkin |
| 1937 | Munster | 1–9 | Leinster | 3–1 | Croke Park | Mick Mackey |
| 1938 | Munster | 6–2 | Leinster | 4–3 | Croke Park | Jim Lanigan |
| 1939 | Munster | 4–4 | Leinster | 1–6 | Croke Park | John Keane |
| 1940 | Munster | 4–9 | Leinster | 5–4 | Croke Park | Seán Barrett |
| 1941 | Leinster | 2–5 | Munster | 2–4 | Croke Park | Bobby Hinks |
| 1942 | Munster | 4–9 | Leinster | 4–5 | Croke Park | Willie O'Donnell |
| 1943 | Munster | 4–3 | Leinster | 3–5 | Croke Park | Jack Lynch |
| 1944 | Munster | 4–10 | Connacht | 4–4 | Croke Park | Seán Condon |
| 1945 | Munster | 6–8 | Ulster | 2–0 | Croke Park | Johnny Quirke |
| 1946 | Munster | 3–12 | Connacht | 4–8 | Croke Park | Ger Cornally |
| 1947 | Connacht | 2–5 | Munster | 1–1 | Croke Park | Seán Duggan |
| 1948 | Munster | 3–5 | Leinster | 2–5 | Croke Park | Willie 'Long Puck' Murphy |
| 1949 | Munster | 5–3 | Connacht | 2–9 | Croke Park | Jim Ware |
| 1950 | Munster | 0–9 | Leinster | 1–3 | Croke Park | Pat Stakelum |
| 1951 | Munster | 4–9 | Leinster | 3–6 | Croke Park | Seán Kenny |
| 1952 | Munster | 5–11 | Connacht | 4–2 | Croke Park | Pat Stakelum |
| 1953 | Munster | 5–7 | Leinster | 5–5 | Croke Park | Christy Ring |
| 1954 | Leinster | 0–9 | Munster | 0–5 | Croke Park | Johnny McGovern |
| 1955 | Munster | 6–8 | Connacht | 3–4 | Croke Park | Christy Ring |
| 1956 | Leinster | 5–11 | Munster | 1–7 | Croke Park | Nick O'Donnell |
| 1957 | Munster | 5–7 | Leinster | 2–5 | Croke Park | Mick Cashman |
| 1958 | Munster | 3–7 | Leinster | 3–5 | Croke Park | Phil Grimes |
| 1959 | Munster | 7–11 | Connacht | 2–6 | Croke Park | Tony Wall |
| 1960 | Munster | 6–6 | Leinster | 2–7 | Croke Park | Frankie Walsh |
| 1961 | Munster | 4–12 | Leinster | 1–9 | Croke Park | Tony Wall |
| 1962 | Leinster | 1–11 | Munster | 1–9 | Croke Park | Noel Drumgoole |
| 1963 | Munster | 2–8 | Leinster | 2–7 | Croke Park | Jimmy Doyle |
| 1964 | Leinster | 3–7 | Munster | 2–9 | Croke Park | Séamus Cleere |
| 1965 | Leinster | 3–11 | Munster | 0–9 | Croke Park | Paddy Moran |
| 1966 | Munster | 3–13 | Leinster | 3–11 | Croke Park | Jimmy Doyle |
| 1967 | Leinster | 2–14 | Munster | 3–5 | Croke Park | Ollie Walsh |
| 1968 | Munster | 0–14 | Leinster | 0–10 | Croke Park | Mick Roche |
| 1969 | Munster | 2–9 | Connacht | 2–9 | Croke Park |
| Replay | Munster | 3–13 | Connacht | 4–4 | Pearse Stadium | Len Gaynor |
| 1970 | Munster | 2–15 | Leinster | 0–9 | Croke Park | Gerald McCarthy |
| 1971 | Leinster | 2–17 | Munster | 2–12 | Croke Park | Tony Doran |
| 1972 | Leinster | 3–12 | Munster | 1–10 | Croke Park | Jim Treacy |
| 1973 | Leinster | 1–13 | Munster | 2–8 | Croke Park | Pat Delaney |
| 1974 | Leinster | 2–15 | Munster | 1–13 | Croke Park | Pat Henderson |
| 1975 | Leinster | 2–9 | Munster | 1–11 | Croke Park | Pat Delaney |
| 1976 | Munster | 4–9 | Leinster | 4–8 | Croke Park | Éamonn O'Donoghue |
| 1977 | Leinster | 2–17 | Munster | 1–13 | Croke Park | Tony Doran |
| 1978 | Munster | 2–13 | Leinster | 1–11 | Páirc Uí Chaoimh | Charlie McCarthy |
| 1979 | Leinster | 1–13 | Connacht | 1–9 | Semple Stadium | Phil 'Fan' Larkin |
| 1980 | Connacht | 1–5 | Munster | 0–7 | Croke Park | Joe Connolly |
| 1981 | Munster | 2–16 | Leinster | 2–6 | Cusack Park | Joe McKenna |
| 1982 | Connacht | 3–8 | Leinster | 2–9 | Tullamore | Seán Silke |
| 1983 | Connacht | 0–10 | Leinster | 1–5 | Cavan | Sylvie Lynnane |
| 1984 | Munster | 1–18 | Leinster | 2–9 | Cusack Park | John Fenton |
| 1985 | Munster | 3–6 | Connacht | 1–11 | Semple Stadium | Ger Cunningham |
| 1986 | Connacht | 3–11 | Munster | 0–11 | Ballinasloe | Noel Lane |
| 1987 | Connacht | 2–14 | Leinster | 1–14 | Cusack Park | Conor Hayes |
| 1988 | Leinster | 2–14 | Connacht | 1–12 | Casement Park | Aidan Fogarty |
| 1989 | Connacht | 4–16 | Munster | 3–17 | Wexford | Joe Cooney |
| 1990 | No competition |
| 1991 | Connacht | 1–13 | Munster | 0–12 | Croke Park | Pete Finnerty |
| 1992 | Munster | 3–12 | Ulster | 1–8 | Nowlan Park | Declan Carr |
| 1993 | Leinster | 1–15 | Ulster | 2–6 | | John Power |
| 1994 | Connacht | 1–11 | Leinster | 1–10 | Semple Stadium | Michael Coleman |
| 1995 | Munster | 0–13 | Ulster | 1–9 | Croke Park | Gary Kirby |
| 1996 | Munster | 2–20 | Leinster | 0–10 | Cusack Park | Anthony Daly |
| 1997 | Munster | 0–14 | Leinster | 0–10 | Ballinasloe | Brian Lohan |
| 1998 | Leinster | 0–16 | Connacht | 2–9 | Nowlan Park | Willie O'Connor |
| 1999 | Connacht | 2–13 | Munster | 1–15 | Semple Stadium | Brian Feeney |
| 2000 | Munster | 3–15 | Leinster | 2–15 | Nowlan Park | Fergal Ryan |
| 2001 | Munster | 1–21 | Connacht | 1–15 | Nenagh | Brendan Cummins |
| 2002 | Leinster | 4–15 | Munster | 3–17 | Nowlan Park | Andy Comerford |
| 2003 | Leinster | 4–9 | Connacht | 2–12 | Rome | Michael Kavanagh |
| 2004 | Connacht | 1–15 | Munster | 0–9 | Salthill | Ollie Fahy |
| 2005 | Munster | 1–21 | Leinster | 2–14 | Boston | John Gardiner |
| 2006 | Leinster | 1–23 | Connacht | 0–17 | Pearse Stadium | Eddie Brennan |
| 2007 | Munster | 2–22 | Connacht | 2–19 | Croke Park | John Mullane |
| 2008 | Leinster | 1–15 | Munster | 1–12 | O'Moore Park | Tommy Walsh |
| 2009 | Leinster | 3–18 | Connacht | 1–17 | Abu Dhabi | J.J. Delaney |
| 2010 | No competition |
| 2011 | No competition |
| 2012 | Leinster | 2–19 | Connacht | 1–15 | Nowlan Park | Jackie Tyrell |
| 2013 | Munster | 1-22 | Connacht | 0-15 | Cusack Park (Ennis) | Brendan Maher |
| 2014 | Leinster | 1-23 | Connacht | 0-16 | Croke Park | Conal Keaney |
| 2015 | No competition |
| 2016 | Munster | 2-20 | Leinster | 2-16 | Semple Stadium | Brendan Maher |
