= Hurling Final =

Hurling Final can refer to a number of different hurling matches:

== National ==
- The last match to be played in the All-Ireland Senior Hurling Championship
- The last match to be played in the All-Ireland Minor Hurling Championship
- The last match to be played in the All-Ireland Under-21 Hurling Championship

== Leinster ==
- The last match to be played in the Leinster Senior Hurling Championship
- The last match to be played in the Leinster Minor Hurling Championship
- The last match to be played in the Leinster Under-21 Hurling Championship

== Munster ==
- The last match to be played in the Munster Senior Hurling Championship
- The last match to be played in the Munster Minor Hurling Championship
- The last match to be played in the Munster Under-21 Hurling Championship

== See also ==
- List of Interprovincial Hurling Championship finals
