= Youghal (disambiguation) =

Youghal is a town in County Cork, Ireland.

Youghal may also refer to:

- Youghal (Parliament of Ireland constituency)
- Youghal (townland), a townland in County Tipperary, Ireland
- Youghal (UK Parliament constituency)
- Youghal GAA, a GAA club in the town of Youghal
- Youghal Greyhound Stadium
- Youghal International College
- Youghal Priory
