= Billy Dwyer =

Irish hurler (1934–2020)

Personal information
- Native name: Liam Ó Duibhir (Irish)
- Nickname: Billy
- Born: 1934 Kilkenny, Ireland
- Died: 27 September 2020 (aged 86) Whitehall Road West, Dublin, Republic Of Ireland
- Occupation: Carpenter
- Height: 5 ft 9 in (175 cm)

Sport
- Sport: Hurling
- Position: Full-forward
Clubs
- Years: Club
- Foulkstown; Faughs
Club titles
- Dublin titles: 2
Inter-county*
Years	County	Apps (scores)
1956–1963	Kilkenny	19 (16–25)
Inter-county titles
- Leinster titles: 3
- All-Irelands: 2
- NHL: 1
- *Inter County team apps and scores correct as of 22:09, 1 December 2014.

Philip O'Dwyer (1934 – 27 September 2020), commonly known as Billy Dwyer, was an Irish hurler whose career included two All-Ireland Championship victories with the Kilkenny senior hurling team.

Born in Kilkenny, Dwyer first played competitive hurling during his schooling at St. Patrick's De La Salle. He arrived on the inter-county scene at the age of twenty-two when he first linked up with the Kilkenny senior team. He made his senior debut during the 1956 Walsh Cup. Dwyer went on to enjoy a successful career, winning two All-Ireland medals, three Leinster medals and one National Hurling League medal. He was an All-Ireland runner-up on one occasion.

As a member of the Leinster inter-provincial team on a number of occasions, Dwyer was a one-time Railway Cup medallist. At club level he is a two-time championship medallist with Faughs.

Dwyer retired from inter-county hurling following the conclusion of the 1963 championship.

== Playing career ==
=== Foulkstown ===
Dwyer began his club career at junior level with the Foulkstown club just outside Kilkenny. He came to widespread prominence as a member of the Foulkstown junior team that lost the County Junior Championship to Glenmore in 1953.

=== Faughs ===
After moving to Dublin, Dwyer joined the Faughs club but success came in the twilight of his club career. On 13 September 1970, he won a County Senior Championship medal after scoring 2-01 from full-forward in the 5–15 to 3–09 win over St. Vincent's in the final. O'Dwyer claimed a second winners' medal two years later when he again lined out at full-forward in the 1–12 to 3–02 win over O'Toole's in the final.

=== Kilkenny ===
Dwyer joined the Kilkenny senior team in advance of the 1956 Leinster Championship and made his debut on 20 May 1956 when he scored two goals from full-forward in a 6–11 to 3-09 quarter-final win over Westmeath. On 8 July 1956, Dwyer lined out in his first Leinster final, however, Kilkenny suffered a 4–08 to 3–10 defeat by reigning champions Wexford.

On 12 May 1957, Dwyer contested his first national final when Kilkenny faced Tipperary in the final of the 1956-57 National League. He ended the game on the losing side after a 3–11 to 2–07 defeat. Dwyer lined out in a second successive Leinster final on 4 August 1957 and claimed his first winners' medal after scoring 1–02 in the 6–09 to 1–05 defeat of Wexford. On 1 September 1957, he again lined out at full-forward when Kilkenny faced Waterford in the All-Ireland final. Dwyer was again amongst the goalscorers and ended the game with his first winners' medal after the 4–10 to 3–12 victory.

Dwyer lined out in a third successive provincial decider when Kilkenny qualified to play Wexford in the 1958 Leinster final. He ended the game with a second successive winners' medal after scoring two goals in the 5–12 to 4–09 victory.

Dwyer missed the 1959 Leinster Championship, however, he was recalled to the starting fifteen at full-forward for the All-Ireland final against Waterford on 6 September 1959. He scored 1–01 in the 1–17 to 5–05 draw. The replay on 4 October 1959 saw Dwyer again line out at full-forward, however, in spite of top-scoring with five points he ended the game on the losing side after the 3–12 to 1–10 defeat.

On 6 May 1962, Dwyer claimed his second national title when Kilkenny defeated Cork by 1–16 to 1–08 to claim the National League title for the first time in 30 years. He was subsequently denied a third Leinster Championship medal as Kilkenny suffered a 3–09 to 2–10 defeat by Wexford in the 1962 Leinster final.

Walsh claimed his third provincial winners' medal after making his fifth final appearance in the 2–10 to 0–09 defeat of Dublin in the 1963 Leinster final. On 1 September 1963, he lined out at full-forward for the fourth time in seven seasons against Waterford in an All-Ireland final. Dwyer was held scoreless throughout the hour, but collected his second All-Ireland winners' medal after the 4–17 to 6–08 victory.

=== Leinster ===
Dwyer's performances for Kilkenny led to his inclusion on the Leinster inter-provincial team for the 1957 Railway Cup. Munster dominated the competition at the time, with Dwyer losing four finals in his first five seasons with the team. He claimed his only winners' medal on 17 March 1962 when he lined out at full-forward in Leinster's 1–11 to 1–09 defeat of Munster in the final. He ended the competition as top scorer with 6-02.

== Honours ==
Faughs

- Dublin Senior Hurling Championship (1): 1970, 1972

Kilkenny

- All-Ireland Senior Hurling Championship (2): 1957, 1963
- Leinster Senior Hurling Championship (3): 1957, 1958, 1963
- National Hurling League (1): 1961-62
- Oireachtas Tournament (2): 1957, 1959

Leinster

- Railway Cup (1): 1962
