= Noel Drumgoole =

Irish hurler and manager

Personal information
- Native name: Nollaig Dromgúl (Irish)
- Born: 1931 Dublin, Ireland
- Died: 9 January 1995 (aged 63) Phibsborough, Dublin, Ireland
- Occupation: Greyhound racing executive
- Height: 6 ft 1 in (185 cm)

Sport
- Sport: Hurling
- Position: Full-back
Club
- Years: Club
- St. Vincent's
Inter-county
Years	County	Apps (scores)
1953-1963	Dublin	14 (0-00)
Inter-county titles
- Leinster titles: 1
- All-Irelands: 0
- NHL: 0

Noel Drumgoole (1931 – 9 January 1995) was an Irish hurler and manager who played as a full-back for the Dublin senior team and managed the Limerick senior hurling team on two occasions.

In 1984, he was named on the Centenary Team of players who had not won All-Ireland honours.

In 1968, Noel founded the Na Piarsaigh GAA Club on the north side of Limerick city. In 2011 Na Piarsaigh won their first County Senior Championship beating Ahane on a scoreline of 2-18 to 0-13. The club then went on to beat Crusheen of Clare in the Munster Club Final in Semple Stadium.

== Playing career ==
=== Inter-county ===
In 1961, Noel, from the St Vincents club, captained Dublin when they won the Leinster Championship, beating Wexford 7-5 to 4-8 in the final. He led Dublin all the way to the All-Ireland Final but they were narrowly beaten 0-16 to 1-12 by a marvellous Tipperary team.

=== Inter-provincial ===
Noel won three Railway Cup medals with Leinster in 1956, 1962 and 1964. He captained the 1962 team to success.

== Honours ==
St Joseph's CBS

- Leinster Colleges Junior Hurling Championship (1): 1946

Dublin

- Leinster Senior Hurling Championship (1): 1961
- Leinster Minor Football Championship (1): 1949

Leinster

- Railway Cup (3): 1956, 1962, 1964

Sporting positions
Preceded by	Dublin Senior Hurling Captain; 1961	Succeeded by
Preceded by	Leinster Senior Hurling Captain; 1962	Succeeded by
Preceded by	Limerick Senior Hurling Manager; 1977-1982	Succeeded by Michael O'Grady
Preceded by Michael O'Grady	Limerick Senior Hurling Manager; 1984-1986	Succeeded by Éamonn Cregan
Achievements
Preceded by Nick O'Donnell (Wexford)	Leinster Senior Hurling Final winning captain 1961	Succeeded by Billy Rackard (Wexford)
Preceded by Tony Wall (Munster)	Interprovincial Hurling Final winning captain 1962	Succeeded by Jimmy Doyle (Munster)
