= 1955 All-Ireland Minor Hurling Championship =

All-Ireland Minor Hurling Championship 1955
All Ireland Champions
- Winners: Tipperary (9th win)
- Captain: Ray Reidy

All Ireland Runners-up
- Runners-up: Galway

Provincial Champions
- Munster: Tipperary
- Leinster: Kilkenny
- Ulster: Antrim
- Connacht: Galway

The 1955 All-Ireland Minor Hurling Championship was the 25th staging of the All-Ireland Minor Hurling Championship since its establishment by the Gaelic Athletic Association in 1928.

Dublin entered the championship as the defending champions, however, they were beaten in the Leinster semi-final.

On 4 September 1955 Tipperary won the championship following a 5-15 to 2-5 defeat of Galway in the All-Ireland final. This was their ninth All-Ireland title and their first in two championship seasons.

== Results ==
=== All-Ireland Minor Hurling Championship ===
Semi-finals

| 7 August 1955 Semi-final | Tipperary | 3-13 - 1-08 | Kilkenny | Croke Park, Dublin |

| 14 August 1955 Semi-final | Galway | 6-09 - 2-05 | Antrim | Croke Park, Dublin |

Final

| 4 September 1955 Final | Tipperary | 5-15 - 2-05 | Galway | Croke Park, Dublin |
