= 1958 All-Ireland Senior Hurling Championship final =

1958 All-Ireland Senior Hurling Final
- Event: 1958 All-Ireland Senior Hurling Championship
| Tipperary | Galway |
| 4–9 | 2–5 |
- Date: 7 September 1958
- Venue: Croke Park, Dublin
- Referee: Matt Spain (Offaly)
- Attendance: 47,276

The 1958 All-Ireland Senior Hurling Championship Final was the 71st All-Ireland Final and the culmination of the 1958 All-Ireland Senior Hurling Championship, an inter-county hurling tournament for the top teams in Ireland. The match was held at Croke Park, Dublin, on 7 September 1958, between Galway and Tipperary. The Connacht men lost to the Munster champions on a score line of 4–9 to 2–5.

== Match details ==
1958-09-07
Final

| Tipperary | 4–9 – 2–5 | Galway |

Croke Park, Dublin
Attendance: 47,276
Referee: M. Spain (Offaly)

| Tipperary | Galway |
