= 1939 Oireachtas Cup =

- Dates: 5 November 1939
- Teams: 2
- Champions: Limerick (1st title)
- Runners-up: Kilkenny

Tournament statistics
- Matches played: 1
- Goals scored: 6 (6 per match)
- Points scored: 9 (9 per match)

The 1939 Oireachtas Cup was the first staging of the Oireachtas Cup, an annual hurling tournament played as part of the Oireachtas na Gaeilge. The tournament featured one game which was played on 5 November 1939.

Limerick won the title following a 4-4 to 2-5 defeat of Kilkenny in the final.

== Result ==
=== Final ===
5 November 1939 Final	Limerick	4-4 – 2-5	Kilkenny	Croke Park
