= Paddy Croke =

Irish hurler (died 1992)

Paddy Croke (died 1992), was an Irish hurler. A full-forward, he played in the 1961 All-Ireland Senior Hurling Championship final on the Dublin team, against Tipperary. Croke, the only non-Dubliner on the team, was originally from Ballinure in Tipperary. He won Dr Harty Cup medals while at CBS Thurles.

== Personal life ==
Paddy was married to Margaret Croke.

== Death ==
Paddy died from a heart attack in August 1992.
