= Achille Boothman =

Irish hurler (1939–2018)

Personal information
- Native name: Achille Bútman (Irish)
- Born: February 1939 Crumlin, Dublin, Ireland
- Died: 26 July 2018 (aged 79) Tallaght, Dublin, Ireland
- Height: 5 ft 5 in (165 cm)

Sport
- Sport: Hurling
- Position: Right wing-forward
Clubs
- Years: Club
- St. Columba's; Crumlin
Club titles
- Dublin titles: 0
Inter-county
- Years: County
- 1959–1968: Dublin
Inter-county titles
- Leinster titles: 1
- All-Irelands: 0
- NHL: 0

Liam Boothman (February 1939 – 26 July 2018), better known as Achille Boothman, was an Irish hurler who played as a right wing-forward for club sides St. Columba's and Crumlin and at inter-county level with the Dublin senior hurling team.

== Playing career ==
=== Inter-county ===
After playing for the Dublin minor team for two unsuccessful seasons in 1956 and 1957, Boothman made his senior debut on 8 November 1959 in a National League defeat of recently crowned All-Ireland champions Waterford. Later that season he made his first championship start in a Leinster Championship semi-final draw with Wexford.

On 16 July 1961, Boothman was at right wing-forward when Dublin defeated Wexford by 7-05 to 4-08 to win the Leinster Championship. In the subsequent All-Ireland final on 3 September 1961, Boothman played in the same position against Tipperary. The game ended in chaos, with Dublin losing by a point.

== Honours ==
Dublin

- Leinster Senior Hurling Championship (1): 1961

Leinster

- Railway Cup (1): 1962
