= Tony Wall (hurler) =

Irish hurler and manager

Personal information
- Native name: Tonaí de Laval (Irish)
- Born: 9 May 1934 (age 92) Thurles, County Tipperary, Ireland
- Occupation: Army officer
- Height: 6 ft 0 in (183 cm)

Sport
- Sport: Hurling
- Position: Centre-back
Club
- Years: Club
- Thurles Sarsfields
Club titles
- Tipperary titles: 10
Inter-county
Years	County	Apps (scores)
1953–1967	Tipperary	33 (3–10)
Inter-county titles
- Munster titles: 6
- All-Irelands: 5
- NHL: 6

Anthony Wall (born 9 May 1934) is an Irish former hurler and manager who played as a centre-back at senior level for the Tipperary county team.

Wall joined the team during the 1953–54 National League and was a regular member of the starting fifteen until his retirement after the 1967 championship. During that time he won five All-Ireland medals, six Munster medals and six National Hurling League medals. Wall captained the team to the All-Ireland title in 1958.

At club level Wall was a ten-time county club championship medalist with Thurles Sarsfields.

== Playing career ==
=== Colleges ===
Wall first experienced hurling success when he was a student at Thurles CBS. He won back-to-back Dr Harty Cup medals in 1950 and 1951 as Thurles defeated Cork opposition on both occasions.

=== Club ===
Wall played his club hurling with Thurles Sarsfields.

After graduating from the minor team in 1952, Wall immediately joined the club's senior team. That year Thurles Sars reached the final of the club championship. A 5–6 to 1–8 trouncing of Borris-Ileigh gave him his first championship medal.

It was 1955 before Thurles Sarsfields reached the championship decider again. The team was now beginning to assert itself as the dominant force in club hurling. Another 4–10 to 0–6 trouncing of Borris-Ileigh gave Wall his first championshipmedal. It was the first of a record-breaking five successive championships for Thurles Sarsfields. Subsequent defeats of Lorrha, Na Piarsaigh, Toomevara and Kilruane MacDonagh's brought Wall's medal tally to five.

Six-in-a-row proved beyond Thurles Sarsfields, however, Wall's side lined out in a seventh successive championship final in 1961. A 3–4 to 0–9 defeat of Toomevara gave Wall a seventh championship medal. Once again Thurles Sars went on to dominate the club championship for the next four seasons. Further defeats of Moycarkey-Borris, Roscrea, Holycross-Ballycahill and Carrick Davins in a replay gave Wall his tenth championship medal.

Wall retired from club hurling shortly afterwards without any further success.

=== Inter-county ===
Wall first came to prominence on the inter-county scene as a member of the Tipperary minor hurling team in 1950. That year he won his first Munster medal as Clare were trounced by 12–3 to 2–0 in the provincial decider. Tipp were later beaten by Kilkenny in the All-Ireland decider.

Tipp lost their provincial title to Cork in 1951; however, Wall added a second Munster minor medal to his collection in 1952 when he captained the team from the half-forward line. Once again the county reached the All-Ireland final. Dublin provided the opposition on that occasion; however, Tipp trounced the Metropolitans by 9–9 to 2–3 giving Wall an All-Ireland Minor Hurling Championship medal in the minor grade.

Wall subsequently became part of the Tipperary senior team and made his debut in 1953. The county was going through a fallow period as Cork dominated the provincial championship in the early 1950s. Wall played in the full-back position for a number of years and collected his first silverware, a National Hurling League medal. in 1957 as Tipp defeated Kilkenny.

When Pat Stakelum retired after the 1957 championship, Wall was the obvious choice to take over his position at centre-back. Not only that but he was appointed captain for the 1958 campaign. That year Tipp regained the Munster title for the first time since 1951 following a 4–12 to 1–5 trouncing of Waterford. It was Wall's first provincial medal at senior level. Tipp later defeated Kilkenny in the All-Ireland semi-final before lining out against Galway in the championship decider. Galway got a bye into the final without picking up a hurley. Liam Devaney, Donie Nealon and Larry Keane all scored goals for Tipp in the first-half, while Wall sent a seventy-yard free untouched to the Galway net. Tipp won the game by 4–9 to 2–5 giving Wall his first senior All-Ireland medal and the honour of collecting the Liam MacCarthy Cup. Wall was also named as man of the match and had now gone down in history as one of the few players to captain his county to All-Ireland titles at both minor and senior levels. He was later honoured by becoming the inaugural winner of the Caltex Hurler of the Year award.

Wall won a second National League medal in 1959 following a 0–15 to 0–7 defeat of Waterford, however, Tipperary surrendered their provincial and All-Ireland crowns.

Tipperary asserted their dominance in 1960 by retaining the National League title with a 2–15 to 3–8 defeat of Cork. It was Wall's third winners' medal in that competition. He later won a second Munster medal following a narrow 4–13 to 4–11 defeat of Cork in what has been described as the toughest game of hurling ever played. This victory allowed Tipperary to advance directly to an All-Ireland final meeting with Wexford. A certain amount of over-confidence was obvious in the Tipperary camp, particularly in trainer Phil Purcell's comment that no player was capable of marking Jimmy Doyle. The game ended in remarkable circumstances as the crowd invaded the pitch with a minute to go, mistaking the referee's whistle for the end of the game. When the crowd were finally moved off the pitch Tipperary continued playing with only twelve men, but Wexford won on a score line of 2–15 to 0–11.

1961 saw Wall collect a fourth National League medal, however, he missed the subsequent Munster final against Cork due to his duties with the army in Cyprus. The absence of the All-Ireland semi-final allowed Tipp to advance directly to the final itself with Dublin's first native hurling team providing the opposition. The game was a close run thing, however, Tipp held on to win by 0–16 to 1–12. It was Wall's second All-Ireland medal.

In 1962 Tipperary defeated all before them in the Munster Championship yet again. A 5–14 to 2–3 trouncing of Waterford in the decider gave Wall, by now the vice-captain of the team, a third Munster medal. Tipp's nemesis of two-years earlier, Wexford, waited in Croke Park to test them once again in the subsequent All-Ireland final. Wexford, however, were not the force of old and the side got off to possibly the worst start ever by a team in a championship decider. After just ninety seconds the Leinster champions were down by 2 goals, however, the game turned out to be much closer than people expected. Tipp eventually secured the win on a score line of 3–10 to 2–11, giving Wall a third All-Ireland medal.

After losing the following years' Munster final to Waterford in one of the hurling shocks of the decade, Tipperary bounced back in 1964 with Wall collecting a fifth National League medal. Tipp later cantered casually past Cork by fourteen points in the provincial decider, giving Wall a fourth Munster medal. Kilkenny, the reigning All-Ireland champions and staunch local rivals of Tipp, provided the opposition in the subsequent All-Ireland final and were installed as the firm favourites. Tipp had other ideas and their fourteen-point winning margin, 5–13 to 2–8, was the biggest All-Ireland final win since Tipperary had overwhelmed Laois in the 1949 decider. It was Wall's fourth All-Ireland medal.

In 1965 Wall won a sixth and final National League medal as New York fell in the final once again. Tipp demolished all opposition in the provincial championship once again and a 4–11 to 0–5 trouncing of Cork gave Wall a fifth Munster medal. Wexford were Tipp's opponents in the subsequent All-Ireland final, however, the game failed to live up to the two classic games between the two sides in 1960 and 1962. Victory went to Tipp on that occasion by 2–16 to 0–10 with Wall collecting a fifth and final All-Ireland medal.

Tipp lost their provincial and All-Ireland crowns in spectacular fashion at the first hurdle in 1966 when a young Limerick team took them by surprise. The team bounced back in 1967 with Wall collecting a sixth Munster medal. By this stage, however, Tipp's pool of players were getting older and the county's hurling fortunes were in decline. Kilkenny provided the opposition in the subsequent All-Ireland final and provided more than a match for Tipperary. Three quick goals laid to rest a bogey that Tipperary had over Kilkenny since 1922. This was Wall's last appearance for Tipp as he retired from inter-county hurling shortly after the 3–8 to 2–7 All-Ireland final defeat.

=== Inter-provincial ===
Wall also had the honour of being picked for the Munster team in the inter-provincial hurling championship.

He first played for his province in 1958 as Munster qualified for the decider. A narrow 3–7 to 3–5 defeat of archrivals Leinster gave Wall a Railway Cup medal. It was the first of two-in-a-row, as Wall won a second medal following another defeat of Leinster in 1959.

Army duties ruled Wall out of the team in 1960, however, he returned to the Munster fifteen as captain in 1961. A 4–12 to 3–9 defeat of Leinster gave Wall a third Railway Cup medal while he also had the honour of lifting the cup.

After surrendering their title the following year, Munster once again lined out against Leinster in the final of 1963. A 5–5 apiece draw was the result on that occasion, however, Wall collected a fourth Railway Cup medal following a one-point victory in the replay.

After back-to-back defeats over the next two years, Munster had to wait until 1966 for further success. A 3–13 to 3–11 defeat of Leinster gave Wall his fifth and final Railway Cup medal.

== Managerial career ==
In retirement from playing Wall became involved in team management and coaching. He was appointed coach and trainer of the Tipperary senior hurling team in January 1986. It was a fallow time in the fortunes of the county hurling team as it had been a full fifteen years since the last All-Ireland title. After making little progress in Division 2 of the National League, Wall's side subsequently reached the Munster final. Tipp were beaten by Cork on that occasion by 4–17 to 4–11. Wall was later replaced as manager by Babs Keating.

== Personal life ==
Following his secondary education Wall became an Irish army officer. The pinnacle of his career came when he was appointed adjutant general of the army.

== Honours ==
Tipperary

- All-Ireland Senior Hurling Championship (5): 1958 (c), 1961, 1962, 1964, 1965
- Munster Senior Hurling Championship (6): 1958, 1961, 1962, 1964, 1965, 1967

Sporting positions
Preceded by Mickey Byrne	Tipperary Senior Hurling Captain; 1958–1960	Succeeded by Matt Hassett
Preceded by Frankie Walsh	Munster Hurling Captain; 1961	Succeeded by Jimmy Doyle
Preceded by Donie Nealon	Tipperary Senior Hurling Manager; 1986	Succeeded by Michael "Babs" Keating
Achievements
Preceded by Johnny Clifford (Cork)	All-Ireland Minor Hurling Final winning captain 1952	Succeeded by Billy Quinn (Tipperary)
Preceded by Mickey Kelly (Kilkenny)	All-Ireland Senior Hurling Final winning captain 1958	Succeeded by Frankie Walsh (Waterford)
Preceded by Frankie Walsh (Munster)	Railway Cup Hurling Final winning captain 1961	Succeeded by Noel Drumgoole (Leinster)
Awards
Preceded by Newly created award	Caltex Hurler of the Year; 1958	Succeeded by Christy Ring (Cork)
