= Seán Nealon =

Irish hurler

Sport
- Sport: Hurling
Club
- Years: Club
- Burgess
Inter-county
- Years: County
- 1991: Tipperary
Inter-county titles
- Munster titles: 1
- All-Irelands: 0
- NHL: 0

Seán Nealon is a retired Irish sportsperson. He played hurling with his local club Burgess and was a member of the Tipperary senior inter-county team in 1991. He was an unused substitute in the Tipperary team that won the 1991 All-Ireland Senior Hurling Championship Final.
