= Newtown, County Tipperary =

Newtown An Baile Nua (Irish)
- Village
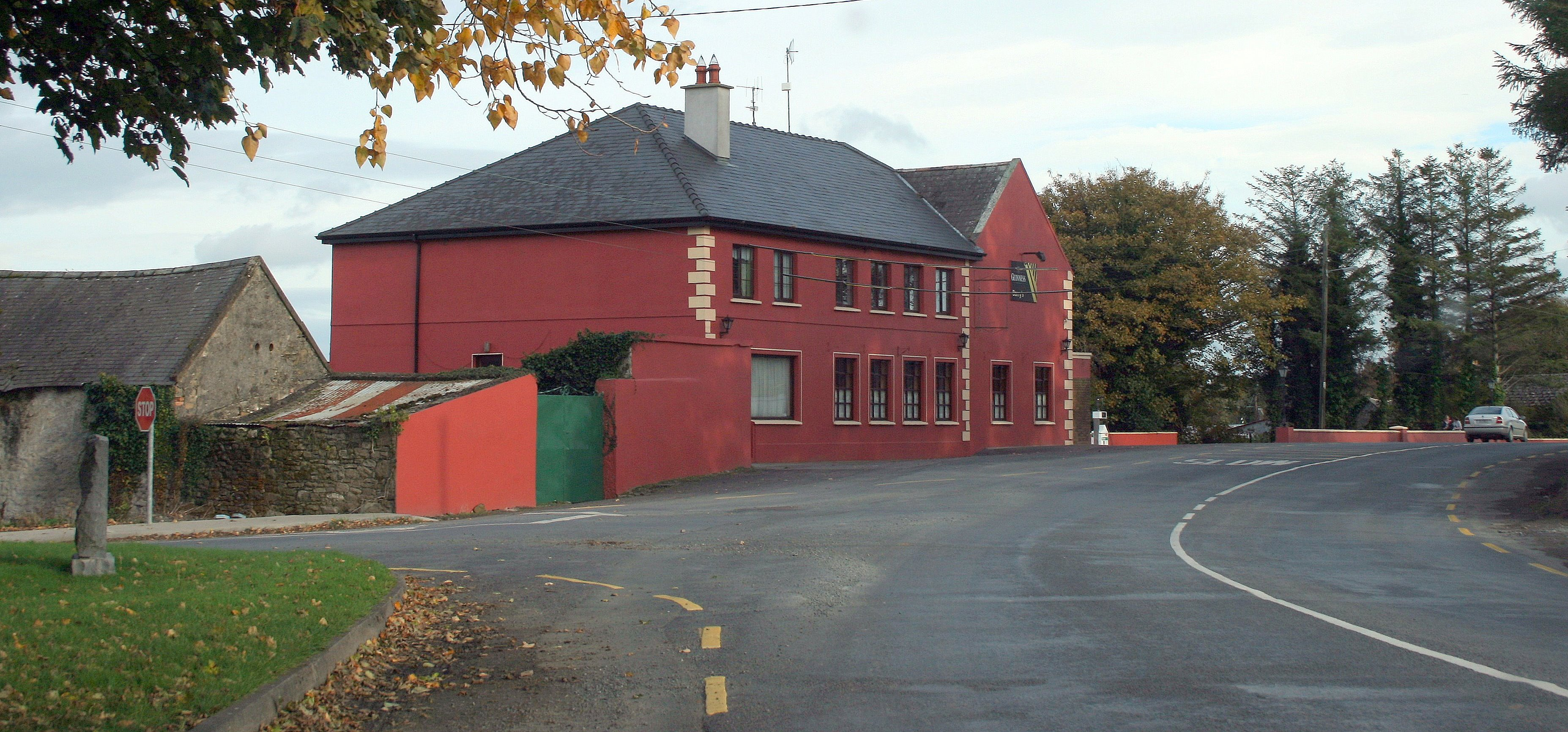
- Heading east towards Nenagh on the R494

- Location in Ireland
- Coordinates: 52°52′43″N 8°17′45″W
- Country: Ireland
- Province: Munster
- County: Tipperary
- Barony: Owney and Arra
- Civil parish: Youghalarra
- Townland(s): Monroe, Pallas Beg

Population (2016)
  - Total: 309
- Time zone: UTC+0 (WET)
  - Summer (DST): UTC-1 (IST (WEST))

Newtown (Irish: An Baile Nua) is a town in County Tipperary, Ireland. It is located on the R494 regional road 7 km (4.3 mi) west of Nenagh. As of the 2016 census, the population was 309. It is in the barony of Owney and Arra. It is also part of the parish of Youghalarra in the Roman Catholic Diocese of Killaloe.

== Geography ==
Newtown's climate is Oceanic (Cfb). The village lies in the base of the Arra Mountains. The Newtown River rises near Tountinna and flows past the town and into Youghal Bay. The town is split between Pallas Beg and Monroe townlands. There are three housing estates in Newtown, and the Arra Rovers FC is based here. There are two pubs and a post office.

== Places of note ==
- Newtown Watermill is a watermill around 320m away from the main road.
- Church of the Holy Spirit is Newtown's main church with large stained glass windows.
- Youghal Quay is a small harbour to dock boats in Youghal.
- St Conlons Well is a holy well in Youghal near a small pond.

== Sport ==
- Burgess GAA is the local Gaelic Athletic Association club.

== See also ==
- List of towns and villages in Ireland
