= 1958 All-Ireland Senior Hurling Championship =

Championship details
- Dates: 20 April – 7 September 1958
- Teams: 14

All-Ireland champions
- Winning team: Tipperary (17th win)
- Captain: Tony Wall

All-Ireland Finalists
- Losing team: Galway
- Captain: Seán Cullinane

Provincial champions
- Munster: Tipperary
- Leinster: Kilkenny
- Ulster: Not Played
- Connacht: Not Played

Championship statistics
- No. matches played: 14
- Top Scorer: Jimmy Doyle (2–23)
- Player of the Year: Tony Wall
- All-Star Team: See here

The All-Ireland Senior Hurling Championship of 1958 was the 72nd staging of Ireland's premier hurling knock-out competition. Tipperary won the championship, beating Galway 4–9 to 2–5 in the final at Croke Park, Dublin.

== The championship ==
=== Format ===
==== Leinster Championship ====
First round: (2 matches) These are two lone matches between four 'weaker' teams from the province. Two teams are eliminated at this stage while the two winners advance to the second round.

Second round: (1 match) This is a single match between the two winners of the first round. One team is eliminated at this stage while the winners advance to the semi-finals.

Semi-finals: (2 matches) The winners of the second round game join three other Leinster teams to make up the semi-final pairings. Two teams are eliminated at this stage, while two teams advance to the Leinster final.

Final: (1 match) The winners of the two semi-finals contest this game. One team is eliminated at this stage, while the winners advance to the All-Ireland semi-final.

==== Munster Championship ====
First round: (2 matches) These are two lone matches between the first four teams drawn from the province of Munster. Two teams are eliminated at this stage while two teams advance to the semi-finals.

Semi-finals: (2 matches) The winners of the two quarter-finals join the other two Munster teams to make up the semi-final pairings. Two teams are eliminated at this stage while two teams advance to the final.

Final: (1 match) The winners of the two semi-finals contest this game. One team is eliminated at this stage while the winners advance to the All-Ireland semi-final.

==== All-Ireland Hurling Championship ====
Semi-finals: (1 match) The Munster and Leinster champions contest this game. One team is eliminated at this stage while the winners advance to the All-Ireland final.

Final: (1 match) The winner of the lone semi-final joins Galway, who received a bye, to contest the final.

== Results ==
=== Leinster Senior Hurling Championship ===
First round

20 April 1958 First round	Offaly	4–10 – 1–04	Meath	O'Connor Park, Tullamore
	T Errity 1–3, P Spellman 1–3, J Brady 1–0, T Cleary 1–0, D Breene 0–2, M Spain 0–1, G Nallen 0–1.		G Kelly 1–0, A Foran 0–2, F Kelly 0–1, M Lenehan 0–1.	Referee: M Leahy (Dublin)

4 May 1958 First round	Laois	5–08 – 4–10	Westmeath	O'Connor Park, Tullamore
	J Lyons 2–1, P Lalor 2–1, T Maher 1–1, O Fennell 0–2, W Bohane 0–1, L O'Mahony 0–1, C O'Brien 0–1.		J McGrath 1–4, J McCarthy 2–0, J Graham 1–1, E Bruer 0–2, T Walsh 0–1, T Bolger 0–1, T Walshe 0–1.	Attendance: 5,000; Referee: B Smith (Meath)

Second round

18 May 1958 Second round	Offaly	2–06 – 1–03	Laois	St. Brendan's Park, Birr
	T Errity 2–2, J Spain 0–2, M Spain 0–1, G Nallen 0–1.		J Lyons 1–0, J O'Mahony 0–1, P Lalor 0–1, T Maher 0–1.	Attendance: 4,000; Referee: J Mulcahy (Kilkenny)

Semi-finals

15 June 1958 Semi-final	Wexford	9–13 – 2–02	Offaly	Nowlan Park, Kilkenny
	T Flood 4–1, P Kehoe 2–1, J O'Reilly 1–4, H O'Connor 1–3, J O'Brien 1–0, O Gough 0–3, B Rackard 0–1.		J Spain 1–0, D Flanagan 1–0, T Errity 0–1, T Cleary 0–1.	Attendance: J Mulcahy (Kilkenny); Referee: 10,000

29 June 1958 Semi-final	Kilkenny	3–02 – 2–05	Dublin	Wexford Park, Wexford
	M Kelly 1–1, B Dwyer 1–0, M Fleming 1–0, S Clohessy 0–1.		A Lynch 2–0, L Shannon 0–2, F Whelan 0–1, A Burke 0–1, B Keyes 0–1.	Attendance: 8,000; Referee: B Smith (Meath)

13 July 1958 Semi-final replay	Kilkenny	7–08 – 2–16	Dublin	Wexford Park, Wexford
	D Heaslip 3–1, M Kelly 1–2, S Clohessy 1–1, D Rockett 1–1, M Fleming 1–0, M Kenny 0–2, B Dwyer 0–1.		D Foley 0–7, L Cashin 1–1, B Keyes 0–4, L Roe 1–0, J Whelan 0–3, J O'Neill 0–1.	Attendance: 10,000; Referee: J Dowling

Final

27 July 1958 Final	Kilkenny	5–12 – 4–09	Wexford	Croke Park, Dublin
	M Kelly 3–4, B Dwyer 2–2, S Clohessy 0–2, M Fleming 0–2, D Rockett 0–1, M Brophy 0–1.		P Kehoe 4–1, J Morrissey 0–3, H O'Connor 0–2, T Flood 0–1, O Gough 0–1, J O'Brien 0–1.	Attendance: 41,729; Referee: B Smith (Meath)

=== Munster Senior Hurling Championship ===
First round

18 May 1958 First round	Cork	5–09 – 3–09	Clare	Gaelic Grounds, Limerick
	C Ring 2–4, T Kelly 1–2, P Fitzgerald 1–0, L Dowling 1–0, M O'Regan 0–2, P Barry 0–1.		N Jordan 1–3, J Smyth 0–5, P Kirby 1–0, B Dilger 1–0, M Dilger 0–1.	Attendance: 16,348; Referee: S Gleeson (Limerick)

1 June 1958 First round	Tipperary	2–10 – 1–05	Limerick	Cork Athletic Grounds, Cork
	Jimmy Doyle 1–6, L Connolly 1–0, L Devaney 0–2, T Wall 0–1, D Nealon 0–1.		L Mooney 1–2, G Keane 0–1, T Casey 0–1, V Cobbe 0–1.	Attendance: 30,516; Referee: C Conway (Cork)

Semi-finals

8 June 1958 Semi-final	Kerry	2–04 – 3–09	Waterford	Fr. Breen Park, Kenmare
	J Whyte 1–1, G Healy 1–0, E Hennessy 0–2, M Wharton 0–1.		D Whelan 1–1, P Grimes 0–4, L Guinan 1–0, M White 1–0, F Walsh 0–3, S Power 0–1.	Attendance: 2,000; Referee: M Walsh (Cork)

22 June 1958 Semi-final	Tipperary	2–06 – 2–04	Cork	Gaelic Grounds, Limerick
	M Connolly 1–0, L Keane 1–0, T Larkin 0–1, D Nealon 0–1, J McGrath 0–1, Jimmy Doyle 0–1, L Devaney 0–1, T English 0–1.		C Ring 1–1, L Dowling 1–0, P Barry 0–2, T Kelly 0–1.	Attendance: 45,064; Referee: G Fitzgerald (Limerick)

Final

6 July 1958 Final	Tipperary	4–12 – 1–05	Waterford	Thurles Sportsfield, Thurles
	L Connolly 2–1, Jimmy Doyle 0–5, L Keane 1–1, J McGrath 1–0, D Nealon 0–3, T Wall 0–1, J Hough 0–1.		M Flannelly 1–0, J Kiely 0–2, P Grimes 0–1, M Lacey 0–1, S Power 0–1.	Attendance: 41,384; Referee: M Walsh (Cork)

=== All-Ireland Senior Hurling Championship ===
10 August Semi-final	Tipperary	1–13 – 1–8	Kilkenny	Croke Park
	Jimmy Doyle (1–8), L Devaney (0–3), L Keane (0–1), T Larkin (0–1).		D Rockett (1–0), M Kelly (0–3), M Brophy (0–1), Fleming (0–1), D Heaslip (0–1), S Clohessy (0–1), J McGovern (0–1).	Attendance: 53,357; Referee: C McLoughlin

7 September Final	Tipperary	4–9 – 2–5	Galway	Croke Park
	D Nealon (2–2), L Keane (1–0), T Wall (1–0), Jimmy Doyle (0–3), T Larkin (0–2), L Connolly (0–1), L Devaney (0–1).		PJ Lawless (1–0), T Conway (1–0), T Kelly (0–3), T Sweeney (0–1), J Fives (0–1).	Attendance: 47,276; Referee: M Spain (Offaly)

== Championship statistics ==
=== Top scorers ===
Top scorers overall

Rank	Player	Club	Tally	Total	Matches	Average
1	Jimmy Doyle	Tipperary	2–23	29	5	5.80
2	Mickey Kelly	Kilkenny	5–10	25	4	6.25
3	Padge Kehoe	Wexford	6-02	20	2	10.00
4	Tommy Errity	Offaly	3-06	15	3	5.00
5	Tim Flood	Wexford	4-02	14	2	7.00
5	Christy Ring	Cork	3-05	14	2	7.00
6	Donie Nealon	Tipperary	2-07	13	5	2.60
7	Billy Dwyer	Kilkenny	3-03	12	4	3.00
8	Denis Heaslip	Kilkenny	3-02	11	4	2.75
8	Liam Connolly	Tipperary	3-02	11	5	2.20

Top scorers in a single game

Rank	Player	Club	Tally	Total	Opposition
1	Tim Flood	Wexford	4-01	13	Offaly
1	Padge Kehoe	Wexford	4-01	13	Kilkenny
1	Mickey Kelly	Kilkenny	3-04	13	Wexford
2	Jimmy Doyle	Tipperary	1-08	11	Kilkenny
3	Denis Heaslip	Kilkenny	3-01	10	Dublin
3	Christy Ring	Cork	2-04	13	Clare
4	Jimmy Doyle	Tipperary	1-06	9	Limerick
5	Tommy Errity	Offaly	2-02	8	Laois
5	Billy Dwyer	Kilkenny	2-02	8	Wexford
5	Donie Nealon	Tipperary	2-02	8	Galway

=== Scoring ===
- Widest winning margin: 32 points
  - Wexford 9–13 : 2–2 Offaly (Leinster semi-final)
- Most goals in a match: 11
  - Wexford 9–13 : 2–2 Offaly (Leinster semi-final)
- Most points in a match: 24
  - Kilkenny 7–8 : 2–16 Dublin (Leinster semi-final)
- Most goals by one team in a match: 9
  - Wexford 9–13 : 2–2 Offaly (Leinster semi-final)
- Most goals scored by a losing team: 3
  - Clare 3–9 : 5–9 Cork (Munster first round)
- Most points scored by a losing team: 16
  - Dublin 2–16 : 7–8 Kilkenny(Leinster semi-final)

=== Miscellaneous ===
- For the first time ever the Munster and Leinster champions clashed in an All-Ireland semi-final. This was due to Galway receiving a bye to the All-Ireland final without playing a single game.
- The meeting of Tipperary and Galway was both sides first meeting in the All-Ireland final since 1925.
