= Seán Cullinane =

Irish hurler

Seán Cullinane (born 1966) is a retired Irish hurler who formerly played with Passage at club level and with Waterford at inter-county level.

Seán was both Passage and Waterford's number one full back for the late 1990s and at the start of the 2000s. Seán's final match for Waterford came on 11 June 2001 against Limerick at Páirc Uí Chaoimh. Seán's inter-county career finished on a sour note, losing to Limerick by 3 points, after having led the match by 11 points after 16 minutes. Since Seán's retirement, it can be said that Waterford GAA have failed to successfully replace him at full back with a number of players such as Tom Feeney, Kevin Moran, Declan Prendergast and Ken McGrath all having been tried out at the position.

Seán had a frustrating club career with Passage having lost three Waterford Senior Hurling Championship finals, most notably in the 1993 final, having lost to Lismore GAA by a single point in an incredibly wet and windy day in Walsh Park. While Seán's final match for Waterford was a disappointment, his last match for Passage was more of a fairytale ending. At the age of 38, Seán came on as a sub in the 2007 Waterford Intermediate Hurling Championship final where Passage beat Dungarvan by 6 points. This ensured that Passage would be back playing senior hurling in 2008.

Seán having now finished as a player at senior level, is head trainer at Passage.

In addition, he was announced as the second shock replacement in a week for the Waterford senior management team, alongside Kend Mcgrath for Nicky Cashin. Seán will act as defensive selector and coach under Michael Ryan for the 2012 season, replacing Br. Philip Ryan of Mt.Sion from 26/03/2012 onwards.

== Honours ==
- Munster Senior Hurling Championship runner-up - 1989, 1998
- Waterford Intermediate Hurling Championship winner - 2007
- Waterford Junior Hurling Championship winner - 2009
- Waterford Senior Hurling Championship runner-up - 1993, 1994 and 1997

== Championship Appearances ==
#	Date	Venue	Opponent	Score	Result	Competition	Match report
1	18 June 1989	Semple Stadium, Thurles	Cork	0-0	5-16 : 4–17	Munster Semi-Final Replay	Irish Times
2	2 June 1989	Páirc Uí Chaoimh, Cork	Tipperary	0-0	2-08 : 0-26	Munster Final	Irish Times
3	3 June 1990	Semple Stadium, Thurles	Cork	0-0	1-08 : 4–15	Munster Semi-Final	Irish Times
4	2 June 1991	Semple Stadium, Thurles	Cork	0-0	0-13 : 2–10	Munster Semi-Final	Irish Times
5	31 May 1992	Semple Stadium, Thurles	Clare	0-0	2-13 : 3–10	Munster Quarter-Final	Irish Times
6	24 May 1992	Semple Stadium, Thurles	Clare	0-0	0-16 : 0–14	Munster Quarter-Final Replay	Irish Times
7	14 June 1992	Semple Stadium, Thurles	Limerick	0-0	1-13 : 2–13	Munster Semi-Final	Irish Times
8	23 May 1993	Walsh Park, Waterford	Kerry	0-0	3-13 : 4–13	Munster Quarter-Final	Irish Times
9	19 June 1994	Semple Stadium, Thurles	Limerick	0-0	2-12 : 2–14	Munster Semi-Final	Irish Times
10	21 May 1995	Páirc Uí Chaoimh, Cork	Tipperary	0-0	1-11 : 4-23	Munster Quarter-Final	Irish Times
11	2 June 1996	Walsh Park, Waterford	Tipperary	0-0	1-14 : 1–11	Munster Quarter-Final	Irish Times
12	25 May 1997	Semple Stadium, Thurles	Limerick	0-0	1-17 : 2-20	Munster Quarter-Final	Irish Times
13	24 May 1998	Austin Stack Park, Tralee	Kerry	0-0	0-20 : 1-09	Munster Quarter-Final	Irish Independent
14	7 June 1998	Páirc Uí Chaoimh, Cork	Tipperary	0-0	0-21 : 2–12	Munster Semi-Final	Irish Independent
15	12 July 1998	Semple Stadium, Thurles	Clare	0-0	3-10 : 1–16	Munster Final	Irish Independent
16	26 July 1998	Croke Park, Dublin	Galway	0-0	1-20 : 1–10	All-Ireland Quarter-Final	Irish Independent
17	16 August 1998	Croke Park, Dublin	Kilkenny	0-0	1-10 : 1–11	All-Ireland Semi-Final	Irish Independent
18	30 May 1999	Semple Stadium, Thurles	Limerick	0-0	1-16 : 1–15	Munster Quarter-Final	Irish Examiner
19	14 June 1999	Semple Stadium, Thurles	Cork	0-0	0-24 : 1–15	Munster Semi-Final	Irish Independent
20	28 June 2000	Páirc Uí Chaoimh, Cork	Tipperary	0-0	0-14 : 0–17	Munster Quarter-Final	Irish Independent
21	10 June 2001	Páirc Uí Chaoimh, Cork	Limerick	0-0	2-14 : 4–11	Munster Semi-Final	Irish Independent
