= Thomas Devaney =

American poet

Thomas Devaney (born 1969) is an American poet and a 2014 Pew Fellow in the Arts. His poem “The Blue Stoop,” which is after a photograph by Zoe Strauss, is also the name of a community literary hub in Philadelphia, founded in 2018. His 2014 book The Picture that Remains with Will Brown is a collaboration between image and text with Devaney’s poems and Brown’s photographs from the early 70’s in Philadelphia. From 2001-2005, he was program coordinator of the Kelly Writers House at the University of Pennsylvania. Since 2011, he has taught in the English Department at Haverford College.
