= Burgess GAA =

Gaelic games club in County Tipperary, Ireland

Burgess
- Buirghéas
- Founded: 1884
- County: Tipperary
- Colours: Green and Gold
- Grounds: Páirc na nGael, Kilcolman
- Coordinates: 52°51′25.37″N 8°15′38.73″W

Playing kits
Standard colours

Burgess GAA is a Gaelic Athletic Association Club located in the areas of Burgess-Burgessbeg, Youghalarra and Newtown, County Tipperary, Ireland. It fields Gaelic Football and Hurling teams in the North Division of Tipperary GAA.

== Hurling ==
=== Honours ===
- North Tipperary Senior Hurling Championship (1)
  - Youghalarra 1909
- Séamus Ó Riain Cup (1)
  - 2018
- North Tipperary Intermediate Hurling Championship (1)
  - Youghalarra 1942
- North Tipperary Intermediate Hurling Championship (14)
  - Burgess 1941, 1951, 1953, 1956, 1959, 1963, 1964, 1969, 1970, 1976, 1992, 1993, 2003, 2005
- Tipperary Junior A Hurling Championship (2)
  - 1964, 1976
- North Tipperary Junior Hurling Championship (2)
  - Youghalarra 1909, 1931
- North Tipperary Junior Hurling Championship (1)
  - Ballywilliam 1918
- North Tipperary Junior Hurling (A) Championship (3)
  - 2003, 2004, 2005
- Tipperary Junior Hurling (B) Championship (1)
  - 1999
- North Tipperary Junior Hurling (B) Championship (3)
  - 1985, 1991, 1999
- North Tipperary Junior Hurling (C) Championship (1)
  - 2011
- North Tipperary U-21 Hurling (A) Championship (6)
  - 1959, 1970 (with Kildangan as Naomh Padraig), 1971 (with Kildangan as Naomh Padraig), 1999, 2002, 2004, 2011
- Tipperary Under-21 B Hurling Championship (1)
  - 1998
- North Tipperary U-21 Hurling (B) Championship (4)
  - 1988, 1997, 1998, 2024
- North Tipperary Minor Hurling (A) Championship (2)
  - Youghalarra 1936, 1939
- North Tipperary Minor Hurling (A) Championship (1)
  - 2002
- Tipperary Minor Hurling (B) Championship (1)
  - 1990
- North Tipperary Minor Hurling (B) Championship (6)
  - 1974, 1978, 1986, 1990, 2009, 2011

==== All-Ireland Medal Winners ====
All Ireland Senior:

- Donie Nealon (5) 1958, 1961, 1962, 1964 and 1965
- Rody Nealon (1) 1924
- Seán Nealon (1) 1991
- Shane Maher (1) 2010
- Donagh Maher (2) 2016, 2019

Intermediate All-Ireland:

- J.P McDonnell (1) 1971
- Pakie Hogan (1) 1971
- Jim Barry (1) 1971
- Kevin Nealon (1) 2000
- Damien O'Brien (1) 2012

Junior All-Ireland:

- Sean Nealon (2) 1989, 1991
- John Flannery (1) 1989
- Paddy Hogan (1) 1924

U/21 All-Ireland:

- Liam McGrath (1) 1995

Minor All-Ireland:

- John Darcy (1) 1980
- Tony Dunne (1) 2006
- Donagh Maher (1) 2006 - Tony Dunne (1) 2006

== Gaelic Football ==
=== Honours ===
- North Tipperary Intermediate Football Championship (1)
  - 1989
- North Tipperary Junior Football (A) Championship (1)
  - 1981
- Tipperary Junior B Football Championship (2)
  - 2000, 2024
- North Tipperary Junior Football (B) Championship (2)
  - 2000, 2024
- North Tipperary U-21 Football (A) Championship (2)
  - 2002, 2012
- North Tipperary U-21 Football (A) Championship (1) *
  - 1971 * (As Naomh Padraig)
- North Tipperary U-21 Football (B) Championship (3)
  - 1993, 2007, 2010
- North Tipperary Minor Football (A) Championship (4)
  - 1985, 1999, 2006 (as Burgess Gaels), 2009
- North Tipperary Minor Football (B) Championship (3)
  - 1985, 1991, 1994 (with Ballinahinch), 1997
