= Francis Devaney =

Irish sportsperson

Personal information
- Born: 23 January 1984 (age 42) Toomevara, County Tipperary

Sport
- Sport: Hurling
- Position: Half-forward
Club
- Years: Club
- Toomevara
Inter-county
Years	County	Apps (scores)
2005-2007	Tipperary	8 (0-5)
Inter-county titles
- Munster titles: 0
- All-Irelands: 0

Francis Devaney (born 23 January 1984) is an Irish sportsperson. He plays hurling with his local club Toomevara and has also featured on the Tipperary senior inter-county team.

== Early & private life ==
Francis Devaney was born in the parish of Toomevara, County Tipperary in 1984.

== Playing career ==
=== Club ===
Devaney plays his club hurling with Toomevara. He has had some success at underage level and later joined the senior team. Devaney won his first senior county championship title in 2003. He won another county medal in 2004 before winning his first Munster club hurling title. Devaney won a third county title in 2006, before winning his second Munster club title. He was also part of the Toomevara team which won another county title in 2008.

=== Inter-county ===
Devaney joined the Tipperary minor hurling team in the early 2000s. He won back-to-back Munster minor medals in 2001 and 2002, before winning back-to-back Munster under-21 medals in 2003 and 2004. Devaney made his competitive debut with the Tipperary senior hurling team in 2005 when he was introduced as a second-half substitute in a National Hurling League game against Down. Later that year he made his Munster Championship debut in a game against Limerick.
