= Jim Devaney =

Irish hurler

Personal information
- Native name: Séamus Ó Dubhánaigh (Irish)
- Born: 10 October 1907 Borrisoleigh, County Tipperary, Ireland
- Died: 16 January 1987 (aged 79) Borrisoleigh, County Tipperary, Ireland

Sport
- Sport: Hurling
Club
- Years: Club
- Borris–Ileigh
Club titles
- Tipperary titles: 0
Inter-county
- Years: County
- 1936-1937: Tipperary
Inter-county titles
- Munster titles: 0
- All-Irelands: 0
- NHL: 0

James Devaney (10 October 1907 – 16 January 1987) was an Irish hurler. His league and championship career with the Tipperary senior team lasted two seasons from 1936 until 1937.

Devaney first came to prominence as a hurler with the Borris–Ileigh club, with whom he won a county junior championship medal in 1933.

Devaney made his debut on the inter-county scene at the age of twenty-three when he was selected for the Tipperary junior team. He had one championship season in this grade. He was added to the Tipperary senior panel during the 1936 championship and spent two seasons with the team. During that time Tipperary won the All-Ireland and Munster titles.

His son, Liam Devaney, was a five-time All-Ireland medal winner with Tipperary between 1958 and 1965.

== Honours ==
Borris–Ileigh

- Tipperary Junior Hurling Championship (1): 1933
