= 2006 GAA Interprovincial Championship =

The 2006 GAA Interprovincial Championship, (also known as the Railway Cup or The Martin Donnelly Cup was a Gaelic Athletic Association competition between the four provinces of the Island of Ireland. The 2006 football final was held at Boston in the United States of America and the hurling final was played at Pearse Stadium, Galway, Ireland in October 2006. 2006's interprovincial championship finished with Leinster claiming the Martin Donnelly cup in both hurling and Gaelic football.

== Football ==
=== Leinster v Ulster ===
Leinster made the Boston final due to a win over Ulster at Kingspan Breffni Park. The game was refereed by P. Russell from Tipperary.

Winner	Team	Score	Opponent	Team	Score
Leinster	G Connaughton, A Fennelly, D Rooney, M Ennis, C King, C Moran, K Slattery, B Quigley, P Clancy, D Lally, J Doyle (0-4, 2 frees), M Carpenter (0-2), C Keaney (1-3, 1 free), J Sheridan (1-3, 1 pen, 2 frees), B Kavanagh (0-1). Subs: P Barden for Lally, D Earley for Kavanagh, A Mangan for Carptenter, D Reilly for Moran	2-13	Ulster	P Hearty, A Mallon, B Owens, F Bellew, B Dunnion, B Monaghan, P Jordan, D Gordon, N Gallagher, D Clerkin, S Cavanagh (0-2, 1 free), F Doherty, S Johnston (1-5, 4 frees), S O'Neill (1-0), P Bradley (0-3). Subs: K Lacey for Owens, C Toye for Clerkin, P Brady for Monaghan, E Bradley for Doherty	2-10

=== Connacht v Munster ===
Connacht qualified for the Martin Donnelly football final in Boston following a thrilling extra-time victory over Munster at Ballyforan, County Roscommon on Friday, October 6, 2006. The game was refereed by J McKee from Armagh.

Winner	Team	Score	Opponent	Team	Score
Connacht	D Clarke; K Fitzgerald, F Hanley, D Burke; D Heaney, D Blake, B McWeeney; D Brady, J Bergin; A Kerins, M Breheny, E O’Hara; C Mortimer, A Dillon, G Heneghan. Subs: S Davey for Breheny (26), D Meehan for McWeeney (26), G Brady for Heneghan (ht), S Daly for Heaney (ht), D Savage for Davey (60).	1-15	Munster	P Fitzgerald; K O’Connor, M McCarthy, T O’Sullivan; M Shields, G Spillane, A O’Mahony; N Murphy, T Griffin; C McCarthy, G Hurney, S Buckley; K O’Sullivan, K Donaghy, M Russell. Subs: W Hennessy for C McCarthy (49), J Galvin for Buckley (53), J Hayes for K O’Sullivan (58), B Lacey for Hennessy (68).	2-10

=== Final ===
Leinster	2-14 - 2-11 (final score after 70 minutes)	Connacht
Manager: Val Andrews Team: G Connaughton (Gk); A Fennelly; B Cahill; M Ennis; C King; C Moran; K Slattery; B Quigley; P Clancy (0-1); D Lally; J Doyle (0-3, 1 free); M Carpenter (1-2); C Keaney (0-4, 3 frees); J Sheridan (1-2); B Kavanagh (0-1) Substitutes: A Mangan; T Walsh; D Clarke	Half-time: Competition: Interprovincial Championship (Final) Date: 20.00 BST; Sunday, October 21, 2006 Venue: Canton, Boston Attendance: 5,000 Referee: A Mangan; Kerry Match rules: 70 minutes. Replay if scores still level. Maximum of 5 substitutions.	Manager: John O'Mahony Team: D Clarke; D Heaney (0-1); F Hanley; D Burke; S Daly; D Blake; S McDermott; P Harte; D Brady; A Kerins; G Brady; A Dillon (0-2, 1 free); C Mortimer (0-5, 4 frees); M Mheehan (1-1, 1 '45); D Savage Substitutes: K Mannion (0-1); S Davey; K O'Neill (0-1)

=== Results ===
Semi-finals
Leinster	2-13
Ulster	2-10
Connacht	1-15
Munster	2-10

Final
Leinster	2-14
Connacht	2-11

== Hurling ==
=== Leinster v Ulster ===
The game which was played on Saturday, October 14, 2006 was refereed by M Haverty from Galway.

Winner	Team	Score	Opponent	Team	Score
Leinster	J McGarry; M Travers, J Tennyson, J Ryall; T Walsh, R Hanniffy, Diarmuid Lyng (0-01); Derek Lyng, R McCarthy (0-03); E Brennan (0-01); G Hanniffy, D Franks (0-06 (0-06f)); J Bergin (1-00), R Power (0-04 (0-02f)), A Fogarty (1-02). Subs used: E Quigley for Diarmuid Lyng (46 mins), J McCaffrey (0-02) for Bergin (50), D McCormack for Hanniffy, R Mullally for Travers (both 55).	2-19	Ulster	G Clarke; A Bell, G Bell, M Conway; M Molloy, L Hinphey, G Clarke; A Savage, B McGourty; K Stewart, P Braniff, R Convery; J McIntosh (0-10 (0-05f)), G Savage (0-01), D Cullen. Subs used: S McBride (0-01) for Braniff (5 mins), P McCormack for Bell (22), S Clarke for G Savage (half-time), K Kelly for Conway (39), D Coulter for Cullen (48).	0-12

=== Connacht v Munster ===
The game which was played on Sunday, October 15, 2006 was refereed by Brian Gavin from Offaly.

Winner	Team	Score	Opponent	Team	Score
Connacht	L Donoghue; D Joyce, G Mahon, T Regan; D Collins, R Murray, S Kavanagh; F Healy, A Kerins; K Broderick, D Forde, D Tierney; G Farragher, E Cloonan, N Healy. (all Galway)	2-17	Munster	A Nash (Cork); G O'Grady (Clare), S Lucey (Limerick), S Hickey (Limerick); D Fitzgerald (Tipperary), C Plunkett (Clare), A Markham (Clare); P Kelly (Tipperary), M O'Brien (Limerick); D McMahon (Clare), M Walsh (Waterford), T Carmody (Clare); A O'Shaughnessy (Limerick), N Gilligan (Clare), E Kelly (Tipperary).	1-16

=== Final ===
The hurling final is to be played as a curtain raiser to the International rules football first test at Pearse Stadium, Galway on October 28.

Leinster	1-23 - 0-17 (final score after 70 minutes)	Connacht Galway
Manager: John Conron Team: B Mullins (Offaly); R Mullally (Kilkenny); J Tennyson (Kilkenny); J Ryall ( Kilkenny); Diarmuid Lyng (Wexford); R Hanniffy (Offaly); T Walsh (Kilkenny); Derek Lyng (Kilkenny) (0-01); G Hanniffy (Offaly); E Larkin (Kilkenny) (0-02); R Power (Kilkenny) (0-07); D Franks (Offaly); E Brennan (Kilkenny) (0-06); J Bergin (Offaly) (1-03); A Fogarty (Kilkenny) (0-04). Substitutes: M Jacob (Wexford); M Travers (Wexford); J Young (Laois); D McCormack (Westmeath); J McCaffrey (Dublin)	Half-time: Competition: Interprovincial Championship (Final) Date: 15.30 BST; Sunday, October 28, 2006 Venue: Pearse Stadium, Galway Attendance: Referee: Seamus Roche; Tipperary Match rules: 70 minutes. Replay if scores still level. Maximum of 5 substitutions.	Manager: John Fahy Team: L Donoghue; D Joyce; G Mahon; T Og Regan; D Collins; D Cloonan; J Lee; R Murray (0-01); D Tierney (0-01); I Tannian (0-03); M Kerins (0-01); A Kerins; K Burke; E Cloonan (0-09); F Healy (0-02) Substitutes: D Hayes; N Healy; MJ Quinn; K Broderick; G Farragher

=== Results ===
Semi-finals
Leinster	2-19
Ulster	0-12
Connacht	2-17
Munster	1-16

Final
Leinster	1-23
Connacht	0-17
