= Donagh Maher =

Irish hurler (born 1988)

Personal information
- Native name: Donagh Ó Meachair (Irish)
- Born: 28 July 1988 (age 38) Burgess, County Tipperary, Ireland
- Occupation: Account manager
- Height: 5 ft 10 in (178 cm)

Sport
- Sport: Hurling
- Position: Right corner-back
Club
- Years: Club
- 2005–present: Burgess
Club titles
- Tipperary titles: 0
College
- Years: College
- 2007-2012: Galway-Mayo Institute of Technology
College titles
- Fitzgibbon titles: 0
Inter-county*
Years	County	Apps (scores)
2012–2019	Tipperary	14(0-00)
Inter-county titles
- Munster titles: 2
- All-Irelands: 2
- NHL: 0
- All Stars: 0
- *Inter County team apps and scores correct as of 22:56, 6 August 2019.

Donagh Maher (born 28 July 1988) is an Irish hurler who plays for Tipperary Senior Championship club Burgess and previously at inter-county level for the Tipperary senior hurling team.

On 22 October 2019, Maher announced his retirement from inter-county hurling.

== Career statistics ==
Team	Year	National League			Munster		All-Ireland		Total	
Team	Year	Division	Apps	Score	Apps	Score	Apps	Score	Apps	Score
Tipperary	2012	Division 1A	5	0-00	3	0-00	2	0-00	10	0-00
Tipperary	2013	Division 1A	4	0-00	0	0-00	0	0-00	4	0-00
Tipperary	2014	Division 1A	—		—		—		—	
Tipperary	2015	Division 1A	—		—		—		—	
Tipperary	2016	Division 1A	0	0-00	2	0-00	1	0-00	3	0-00
Tipperary	2017	Division 1A	3	0-00	0	0-00	4	0-00	7	0-00
Tipperary	2018	Division 1A	5	0-01	2	0-00	0	0-00	7	0-01
Tipperary	2019	Division 1A	4	0-00	0	0-00	0	0-00	4	0-00
Tipperary	Career total		21	0-01	7	0-00	7	0-0	35	0-01

== Honours ==
Tipperary

- All-Ireland Senior Hurling Championship (2): 2016, 2019
- Munster Senior Hurling Championship (2): 2012, 2016
- Waterford Crystal Cup (1): 2012
- All-Ireland Minor Hurling Championship (1): 2006
