= John Devaney (businessman) =

British businessman (1946–2018)

John Francis Devaney (25 June 1946 – 1 February 2018) was a British businessman. He served as the Chairman of NATS Holdings Ltd (National Air Traffic Services), Cobham Plc the listed UK Aerospace and Defence Company, and National Express. He was also the Chairman of TersusEnergy, a finance and strategic advisory business.

He was previously the Chairman of Liberata UK Ltd, Exel plc, and EA Technology; Executive Chairman of Eastern Electricity and Kelsey-Hayes Company (a wholly owned subsidiary of Varity Corporation); and a non-executive director of HSBC Bank and British Steel. Chairman of Marconi and member of the Board of Northern Rock after acquisition by the Government.

Devaney was an alumnus of Sheffield University (B.Eng 1968) and attended the six-week Harvard Business School Advanced Management Program.

He was a member of the Board of Trustees of Shelter the homelessness charity.

He was awarded non-Exec of the year in 2012 and died in February 2018 at the age of 71.
