= 1952 All-Ireland Minor Hurling Championship =

All-Ireland Minor Hurling Championship 1952
All Ireland Champions
- Winners: Tipperary (7th win)
- Captain: Tony Wall

All Ireland Runners-up
- Runners-up: Dublin

Provincial Champions
- Munster: Tipperary
- Leinster: Dublin
- Ulster: Antrim
- Connacht: Galway

The 1952 All-Ireland Minor Hurling Championship was the 22nd staging of the All-Ireland Minor Hurling Championship since its establishment by the Gaelic Athletic Association in 1928.

Cork entered the championship as the defending champions, however, they were beaten by Tipperary in the Munster semi-final.

On 7 September 1952 Tipperary won the championship following a 9-9 to 2-6 defeat of Dublin in the All-Ireland final. This was their seventh All-Ireland title and their first in three championship seasons.

== Results ==
=== All-Ireland Minor Hurling Championship ===
Semi-final

27 July 1952 Semi-final	Tipperary	9-03 - 0-01	Galway	Gaelic Grounds, Limerick

3 August 1952 Semi-final	Dublin	5-05 - 2-02	Antrim

Final

7 September 1952 Final	Tipperary	9-09 - 2-06	Dublin	Croke Park, Dublin
