= Youghal (townland) =

- Townload
- Interactive map of Youghal
- Country: Ireland

Youghal (Irish: Eochaill) is a townland in the Barony of Owney and Arra, County Tipperary, Ireland. It is located in the civil parish of Youghalarra.
