= John P. Devaney =

American judge (1883–1941)

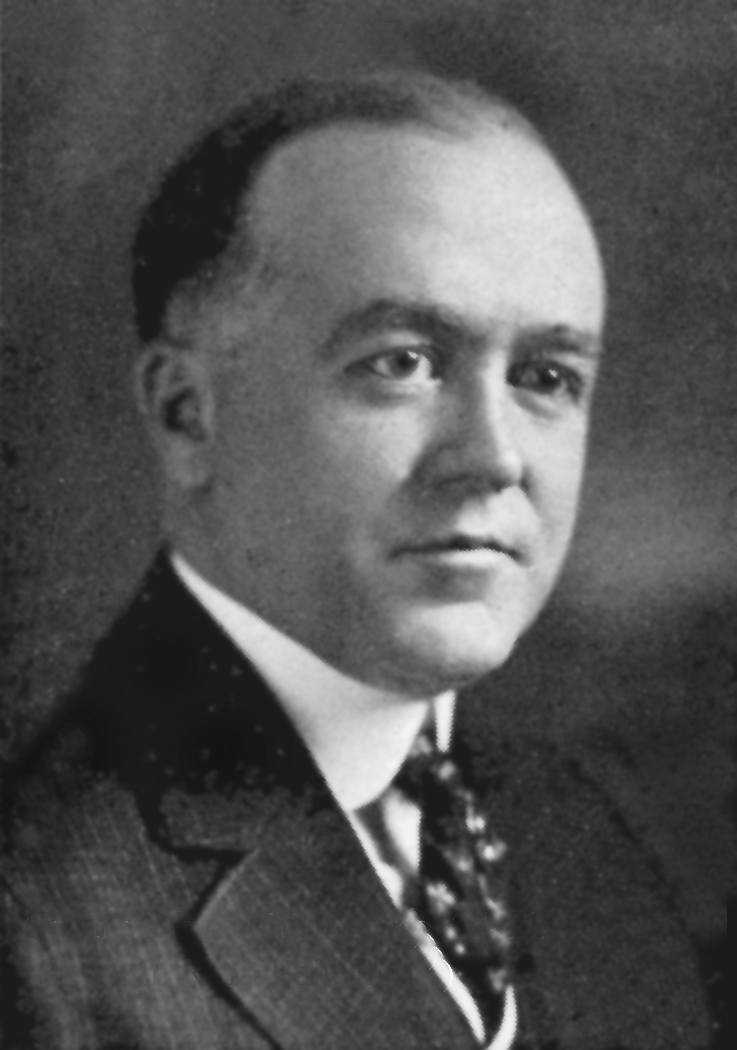
John P. Devaney

John P. Devaney (June 30, 1883 – September 21, 1941) was Chief Justice of the Minnesota Supreme Court until 1937. Born near Lake Mills, Iowa, on June 30, 1883, he moved to Minnesota in 1901 and entered the University of Minnesota. While there, he attained the following degrees: B.A. 1905; LL.B. 1907; LL.M. 1908. Admitted to practice in 1907. Appointed Chief Justice of the Minnesota Supreme Court on September 7, 1933, and elected to that office in November, 1934. He resigned the court in 1937, and resumed the private practice of law.
