= 1962 Railway Cup Hurling Championship =

36th championship staging

- Dates: 18 February 1962 - 17 March 1962
- Teams: 4
- Champions: Leinster (8th title); Noel Drumgoole (captain)
- Runners-up: Munster; Jimmy Doyle (captain)

Tournament statistics
- Matches played: 3
- Goals scored: 26 (8.67 per match)
- Points scored: 41 (13.67 per match)
- Top scorer(s): Billy Dwyer (6-02)

The 1962 Railway Cup Hurling Championship was the 36th staging of the Railway Cup since its establishment by the Gaelic Athletic Association in 1927. The cup began on 18 February 1962 ended on 17 March 1962.

Munster were the defending champions.

On 17 March 1962, Leinster won the championship following a 1-11 to 1-09 defeat of Munster in the final. This was their 8th Railway Cup title and their first since 1956.

Leinster's Billy Dwyer was the top scorer with 6-02.

== Results ==
Semi-finals

18 February 1962 Semi-final	Connacht	1-03 - 6-11	Munster	Duggan Park, Ballinasloe
	PJ Lawless 1-0, M Cullinan 0-1, Salmon 0-1, T Sweeney 0-1.		C Ring 3-1, Jimmy Doyle 1-4, S Power 2-0, PJ Keane 0-2, T English 0-2, J Smyth 0-1, T Morrissey 0-1.

25 February 1962 Semi-final	Ulster	6-03 - 11-04	Leinster	Breffni Park, Cavan
	J McVeigh 3-0, B McGurk 1-0, F Cullinan 1-0, D Crawford 1-0, P Mullaney 0-2, S Gallagher 0-1.		W Dwyer 6-1, W Jackson 2-1, A Boothman 1-1, O McGrath 1-0, C O'Brien 1-0, F Whelan 0-1.

Final

17 March 1962 Final	Leinster	1-11 - 1-09	Munster	Croke Park, Dublin
	D Heaslip 1-0, A Boothman 0-3, F Whelan 0-3, M Kennedy 0-2, S Foley 0-2, W Dwyer 0-1.		L Devaney 0-5, Jimmy Doyle 0-3, D Nealon 1-1.

== Scoring statistics ==
Top scorers overall

Rank	Player	Club	Tally	Total	Matches	Average
1	Billy Dwyer	Leinster	6-02	20	2	10.00

Top scorers in a single game

Rank	Player	Club	Tally	Total	Opposition
1	Billy Dwyer	Leinster	6-01	19	Ulster
2	Christy Ring	Munster	3-01	10	Connacht
3	J. McVeigh	Ulster	3-00	9	Leinster
4	Billy Jackson	Leinster	2-01	7	Ulster
4	Jimmy Doyle	Munster	1-04	7	Connacht

== Bibliography ==
- Donegan, Des, The Complete Handbook of Gaelic Games (DBA Publications Limited, 2005).
