= Oireachtas Cup =

Former hurling competition

- Irish: Corn Oireachtas
- Code: Hurling
- Founded: 1939
- Abolished: 1999
- Region: Ireland (GAA)
- Trophy: Oireachtas Cup
- No. of teams: Various
- Last Title holders: Kilkenny (10th title)
- First winner: Limerick
- Most titles: Galway (11 titles)

The Oireachtas Cup was an annual hurling competition organised by the Gaelic Athletic Association between 1939 and 1999 for the top inter-county teams in Ireland.

The series of games were usually played in the autumn months after the completion of the All-Ireland Senior Hurling Championship. The prize for the winning team was the Oireachtas Cup and a special set of gold medals for the winning team. The tournament was initially a one-off challenge game between two top teams, however, as more teams entered a straight knock-out tournament developed.

The Oireachtas Cup was a post-championship hurling competition, with large crowds at Croke Park on the day of the final. Over time, however, it fell out of favour with both players and supporters and was eventually scrapped.

The title was won at least once by eleven different counties, eight of which have won the title more than once. The all-time joint record-holders are Galway and Tipperary, who won the competition eleven times.

== General statistics ==
=== Performance by county ===
#	Team	Wins	Runners-up	Years won	Years runner-up
1	Galway	11	10	1950, 1952, 1958, 1976, 1981, 1988, 1989, 1991, 1992, 1993, 1997	1944, 1945, 1947, 1959, 1978, 1985, 1986, 1990, 1998, 1999
1	Tipperary	11	2	1945, 1949, 1960, 1961, 1963, 1964, 1965, 1968, 1970, 1972, 1990	1962, 1989
2	Kilkenny	10	8	1940, 1947, 1957, 1959, 1966, 1967, 1969, 1984, 1996, 1999	1939, 1951, 1955, 1956, 1964, 1965, 1973, 1983
3	Wexford	9	14	1951, 1953, 1955, 1956, 1978, 1979, 1980, 1986, 1994	1950, 1952, 1954, 1958, 1961, 1963, 1966, 1971, 1972, 1975, 1981, 1988, 1991, 1995
4	Cork	5	9	1973, 1974, 1975, 1985, 1998	1940, 1960, 1968, 1969, 1970, 1976, 1984, 1994, 1997
5	Clare	4	3	1954, 1982, 1983, 1996	1953, 1967, 1993
6	Dublin	2		1944, 1948	
6	Limerick	2	1	1939, 1971	1982
7	Antrim	1		1946	
7	Waterford	1	4	1962	1948, 1957, 1974, 1992
7	Offaly	1	2	1995	1979, 1980
8	Laois		2		1946, 1949

== List of Oireachtas Finals ==
All-Ireland champions
All-Ireland runners-up

Year	Winners		Runners-up		Venue
Year	County	Score	County	Score	Venue
1939	Limerick	4-04	Kilkenny	2-05	Croke Park
1940	Kilkenny	7-11	Cork	1-06	Croke Park
1941-43	Run as a Gaelic football tournament				
1944	Dublin	6-06	Galway	3-06	Croke Park
1945	Tipperary	4-06	Galway	4-3	Croke Park
1946 (football)	Antrim	2-07	Laois	0-10	Croke Park
1947	Kilkenny	2-12	Galway	2-06	Croke Park
1948	Dublin	3-06	Waterford	2-06	Croke Park
1949	Tipperary	2-08	Laois	1-06	Croke Park
1950	Galway	2-09	Wexford	2-06	Croke Park
1951	Wexford	4-07	Kilkenny	3-07	Croke Park
1952	Galway	3-07	Wexford	1-10	Croke Park
1953	Wexford	5-11	Clare	4-05	Croke Park
1954 (R)	Clare	2-08; 3-06	Wexford	2-08; 0-12	Croke Park
1955	Wexford	3-11	Kilkenny	3-04	Croke Park
1956	Wexford	0-16	Kilkenny	1-09	Croke Park
1957	Kilkenny	4-10	Waterford	3-05	Croke Park
1958	Galway	5-16	Wexford	2-04	Thurles Sportsfield
1959	Kilkenny	6-06	Galway	5-08	Croke Park
1960	Tipperary	4-11	Cork	2-10	Croke Park
1961 (R)	Tipperary	3-06; 2-13	Wexford	2-09; 3-04	Croke Park
1962	Waterford	4-12	Tipperary	3-09	Croke Park
1963	Tipperary	4-15	Wexford	3-12	Croke Park
1964	Tipperary	5-07	Kilkenny	4-08	Croke Park
1965	Tipperary	2-12	Kilkenny	2-07	Croke Park
1966	Kilkenny	4-07	Wexford	1-07	Croke Park
1967	Kilkenny	4-04	Clare	1-08	Croke Park
1968	Tipperary	1-09	Cork	1-06	Thurles Sportsfield
1969	Kilkenny	4-14	Cork	3-10	Croke Park
1970	Tipperary	1-12	Cork	0-08	Thurles Sportsfield
1971	Limerick	4-12	Wexford	3-08	Croke Park
1972 (R)	Tipperary	2-13; 2-13	Wexford	2-13; 1-08	Croke Park; Nowlan Park
1973	Cork	1-08	Kilkenny	1-06	Cork Athletic Grounds
1974	Cork	3-15	Waterford	1-05	The Mardyke
1975	Cork	3-13	Wexford	2-07	Croke Park
1976	Galway	1-15	Cork	2-09	Croke Park
1977	No final took place				
1978	Wexford	0-18	Galway	1-10	Wexford Park
1979	Wexford	3-17	Offaly	5-08	Croke Park
1980	Wexford	1-19	Offaly	3-05	St. Brendan's Park
1981	Galway	1-15	Wexford	1-07	Páirc Uí Chaoimh
1982	Clare	3-09	Limerick	2-09	Cusack Park
1983	Clare	1-12	Kilkenny	1-11	Cusack Park
1984	Kilkenny	1-11	Cork	1-07	Páirc Uí Chaoimh
1985	Cork	2-11	Galway	1-10	Páirc Uí Chaoimh
1986	Wexford	3-17	Galway	1-22	Kenny Park
1987	No tournament				
1988	Galway	4-15	Wexford	3-11	Bellefield GAA Complex
1989	Galway	1-19	Tipperary	0-08	Cusack Park
1990	Tipperary	1-15	Galway	0-07	Cusack Park
1991	Galway	2-12	Wexford	3-05	Duggan Park
1992	Galway	1-13	Waterford	0-10	Páirc an Aghasaigh
1993	Galway	2-19	Clare	3-09	Kenny Park
1994	Wexford	2-07	Cork	1-08	Fraher Field
1995	Offaly	2-13	Wexford	0-09	Wexford Park
1996	Clare	0-11	Kilkenny	1-04	Cusack Park
1997	Galway	0-14	Cork	0-08	Duggan Park
1998	Cork	0-15	Galway	0-10	Páirc Uí Rinn
1999	Kilkenny	4-06	Galway	0-12	MacDonagh Park
