= 1961 All-Ireland Senior Hurling Championship =

Championship details
- Dates: 16 April - 3 September 1961

All-Ireland champions
- Winning team: Tipperary (18th win)
- Captain: Matt Hassett

All-Ireland Finalists
- Losing team: Dublin
- Captain: Noel Drumgoole

Provincial champions
- Munster: Tipperary
- Leinster: Dublin
- Ulster: Not Played
- Connacht: Not Played

Championship statistics
- Top Scorer: Jimmy Doyle (2–17)
- Player of the Year: Liam Devaney
- All-Star Team: See here

The 1961 All-Ireland Senior Hurling Championship was the 75th staging of the All-Ireland hurling championship since its establishment by the Gaelic Athletic Association in 1887. The championship began on 16 April 1961 and ended on 3 September 1961.

Wexford were the defending champions, however, they were defeated in the provincial championship. Tipperary won the title after defeating Dublin by 0–16 to 1–12 in the All-Ireland final.

== Format ==
All-Ireland Championship

Final: (1 match) The two provincial representatives from Leinster and Munster made up the two final teams with the winners being declared All-Ireland champions.

== Results ==
=== Leinster Senior Hurling Championship ===
First round

16 April 1961 First round	Laois	4–05 – 3–08	Westmeath	O'Connor Park
	J Fitzpatrick 2–0, J Conroy 1–2, D Dunne 1–1, J Lyons 0–1, C O'Brien 0–1.		M Bolger 1–2, J Rooney 1–1, B Shields 1–0, J Carey 0–2, M Flanagan 0–1, D Bruer 0–1, S Kirby 0–1.	Referee: J Spain

30 April 1961 First round replay	Westmeath	2–09 – 2–08	Laois	St. Brendan's Park
	M Bolger 1–1, T Houlihan 1–0, S Kirby 0–2, N Bruer 0–2, P Jackson 0–1, M Mullen 0–1, S Bolger 0–1, J Rooney 0–1.		J Conroy 1–1, D Dunne 0–4, J Fitzpatrick 1–0, D Donovan 0–1, P Brennan 0–1, S Cashin 0–1.	Attendance: 2,000; Referee: R Sheppard

Quarter-final

28 May 1961 Quarter-final	Westmeath	3–13 – 3–05	Offaly	Cusack Park
	J McGrath 1–5, J Rooney 1–1, B Shiels 1–0, P McCabe 0–3, M Bolger 0–2, M Mullen 0–1, S Kirby 0–1.		M Banks 1–2, J Cleary 1–1, W Loughnane 1–0, E England 0–1, G Nallen 0–1.	Referee: R Sheppard

Semi-final

18 June 1961 Semi-final	Wexford	6–08 – 5–07	Kilkenny	Croke Park
	A Doyle 4–2, O McGrath 1–3, P Kehoe 1–0, E Doyle 0–2, T Flood 0–1.		B Dwyer 2–3, E Keher 1–3, S Clohessy 1–1, M Carroll 1–0.	Attendance: 31,636; Referee: J Dowling

25 June 1961 Semi-final	Dublin	2–15 – 2–05	Westmeath	O'Connor Park
	L Shannon 1–4, W Jackson 1–2, A Boothman 0–4, F Whelan 0–2, C Hayes 0–1, D Foley 0–1, B Boothman 0–1.		M Bolger 1–1, S Kirby 1–1, M Bruer 0–2, J McGrath 0–1.	Attendance: 5,000; Referee: J Dowling

Final

16 July 1961 Final	Dublin	7–05 – 4–08	Wexford	Nowlan Park
	P Croke 3–0, B Boothman 2–0, L Shannon 1–1, W Jackson 1–0, M Bohane 0–2, D Foley 0–1, C Hayes 0–1.		O McGrath 2–2, T Flood 2–2, P Kehoe 0–2, N Wheeler 0–1, J Morrissey 0–1.	Attendance: 40,000; Referee: J Dowling

=== Munster Senior Hurling Championship ===
Quarter-finals

28 May 1961 Quarter-final	Galway	2–13 – 0–07	Clare	MacDonagh Park
	M Cullinane 1–4, T Sweeney 0–6, J Casey 1–0, PJ Lawless 0–2, P Fahy 0–1.		J Smyth 0–3, N Jordan 0–3, J Cullinan 0–1.	Attendance: 8,000; Referee: J Stapleton (Tipperary)

11 June 1961 Quarter-final	Waterford	4–14 – 4–05	Limerick	Cork Athletic Grounds
	T Walsh 1–2, M Flannelly 1–2, M Murphy 1–1, L Guinan 1–0, F Walsh 0–3, T Cheasty 0–2, S Power 0–2, P Grimes 0–2.		Casey 1–1, Carey 1–1, D Flynn 1–1, J Quaid 1–0, L Hogan 0–2.	Attendance: 12,500; Referee: P Cronin

Semi-finals

2 July 1961 Semi-final	Tipperary	7–12 – 5–06	Galway	Cusack Park
	D Nealon 2–2, T Ryan 2–0, Jimmy Doyle 1–4, L Devaney 0–4, J McKenna 1–0, B Moloughney 1–0, T Moloughney 0–2.		J Gillane 3–0, S Gohety 1–0, PJ Lawless 1–0, T Sweeney 0–3, J Salmon 0–2, M Cullinane 0–1.	Attendance: 17,000; Referee: G Fitzgerald (Limerick)

9 July 1961 Semi-final	Waterford	2–07 – 5–07	Cork	Thurles Sportsfield
	F Walsh 1–3, J Condon 1–0, D Whelan 0–2, S Power 0–1, M Murphy 0–1.		C Ring 3–4, M Quane 2–1, J O'Sullivan 0–1, J O'Connor 0–1.	Attendance: 42,824; Referee: M Hayes

Final

30 July 1961 Final	Tipperary	3–06 – 0–07	Cork	Ennis Road
	L Devaney 1–1, J Doyle 1–1, D Nealon 1–1, J Daly 0–3.		C Ring 0–4, J O'Sullivan 0–2, P Barry 0–1.	Attendance: 62,175; Referee: M Hayes

=== All-Ireland Senior Hurling Championship ===
Final

3 September 1961 Final	Tipperary	0–16 – 1–12	Dublin	Croke Park
	J Doyle 0–9, D Nealon 0–3, M O'Gara 0–2, Moloughney 0–1, J McKenna 0–1.		B Jackson 1–2, A Boothman 0–5, L Shannon 0–3, D Foley 0–1, B Boothman 0–1.	Attendance: 67,866; Referee: G Fitzgerald (Limerick)

== Championship statistics ==
=== Scoring statistics ===
Top scorers overall

Rank	Player	Club	Tally	Total	Matches	Average
1	Jimmy Doyle	Tipperary	2–14	20	3	6.66
2	Christy Ring	Cork	3-08	17	2	8.50
3	Donie Nealon	Tipperary	3-06	15	3	5.00
3	Mick Bolger	Westmeath	3-06	15	4	3.75
4	Andy Doyle	Wexford	4-02	14	2	7.00
4	Oliver McGrath	Wexford	3-05	14	2	7.00
4	Larry Shannon	Dublin	2-08	14	3	5.66
5	Billy Jackson	Dublin	3-04	13	3	4.33
6	Joe Gillane	Galway	3-00	9	1	9.00
6	J. Fitzpatrick	Laois	3-00	9	2	4.50
6	Paddy Croke	Dublin	3-00	9	3	3.00
6	Billy Dwyer	Kilkenny	2-03	9	1	9.00
6	Jimmy Rooney	Westmeath	2-03	9	4	2.25
6	Jack Conroy	Laois	2-03	9	2	4.50
6	Tim Flood	Wexford	2-03	9	2	4.50
6	Frankie Walsh	Waterford	1-06	9	2	4.50
6	Achille Boothman	Dublin	0-09	9	3	3.00

Top scorers in a single game

Rank	Player	Club	Tally	Total	Opposition
1	Andy Doyle	Wexford	4-02	14	Kilkenny
2	Christy Ring	Cork	3-04	13	Waterford
3	Joe Gillane	Galway	3-00	9	Tipperary
3	Paddy Croke	Dublin	3-00	9	Wexford
3	Billy Dwyer	Kilkenny	2-03	9	Wexford
3	Jimmy Doyle	Tipperary	0-09	9	Dublin
4	Oliver McGrath	Wexford	2-02	8	Dublin
4	Tim Flood	Wexford	2-02	8	Dublin
4	Donie Nealon	Tipperary	2-02	8	Galway
4	John McGrath	Westmeath	1-05	8	Offaly

=== Miscellaneous ===
- The Munster final between Cork and Tipperary breaks all previous attendance records. An official crowd of 62,175 is the biggest ever attendance recorded at a sporting event outside of Croke Park in Dublin. An unofficial attendance, due to spectators storming the gates, meant that the crowd could have been as high as 70,000 or more. It remains a record for a Munster decider.
- Westmeath are the top-scoring team in the championship for the first and only (as at 2021) time in their history.
- They are also the first team to be the top scorers in a championship year, yet have a negative score difference. As of July 2021, the only other team to do so would be Waterford (2008).

== Sources ==
- Corry, Eoghan, The GAA Book of Lists (Hodder Headline Ireland, 2005).
- Donegan, Des, The Complete Handbook of Gaelic Games (DBA Publications Limited, 2005).
- Sweeney, Éamonn, Munster Hurling Legends (The O'Brien Press, 2002).
