= 1954 All-Ireland Minor Hurling Championship =

All-Ireland Minor Hurling Championship 1954
All Ireland Champions
- Winners: Dublin (3rd win)
- Captain: Bernie Boothman

All Ireland Runners-up
- Runners-up: Tipperary
- Captain: Larry Quinn

Provincial Champions
- Munster: Tipperary
- Leinster: Dublin
- Ulster: Antrim
- Connacht: Galway

The 1954 All-Ireland Minor Hurling Championship was the 24th staging of the All-Ireland Minor Hurling Championship since its establishment by the Gaelic Athletic Association in 1928.

Tipperary entered the championship as the defending champions in search of a third successive title.

On 5 September 1954 Dublin won the championship following a 2-7 to 2-3 defeat of Tipperary in the All-Ireland final. This was their third All-Ireland title and their first in eight championship seasons.

== Results ==
=== All-Ireland Minor Hurling Championship ===
Semi-finals

1 August 1954 Semi-final	Dublin	7-09 - 2-01	Antrim	Croke Park, Dublin

15 August 1954 Semi-final	Tipperary	10-12 - 1-02	Galway	Croke Park, Dublin

Final

5 September 1954 Final	Dublin	2-07 - 2-03	Tipperary	Croke Park, Dublin
