= Donie Nealon =

Irish hurler

Personal information
- Native name: Dónal Ó Nialláin (Irish)
- Born: December 1935 (age 90) Newtown, County Tipperary, Ireland

Sport
- Sport: Hurling
- Position: Right corner-forward
Clubs
- Years: Club
- Burgess; UCD
Club titles
- Tipperary titles: 0
Inter-county*
Years	County	Apps (scores)
1958–1969	Tipperary	35 (22-42)
Inter-county titles
- Munster titles: 8
- All-Irelands: 5
- NHL: 6
- All Stars: 3
- *Inter County team apps and scores correct as of 19:33, 11 March 2014.

Donie Nealon (born December 1935) is an Irish former hurler who played as a right corner-forward at senior level for the Tipperary county team.

Born in Newtown, County Tipperary, Nealon first played competitive hurling whilst at school in St Flannan's College. He made his first impression on the inter-county scene at the age of twenty he joined the Tipperary junior team. He made his senior debut during the 1958 championship. Nealon went on to play a key role for Tipperary for over a decade, and won five All-Ireland medals, eight Munster medals and six National Hurling League medals. Nealon was an All-Ireland runner-up on three occasions.

As a member of the Munster inter-provincial team at various times throughout his career, Nealon won four Railway Cup medals.

== Playing career ==
=== Club ===
Nealon played his club hurling with his local Burgess-Youghlarra club. Donie was part of the team which created club history by winning the Tipperary Junior Championship in 1964. This was Burgess first County Title and the 1964 team is still held in great affection by all associated with the club. He also played club hurling with UCD and won a senior county title in the 1960s.

=== Inter-county ===
Nealon first came to prominence on the inter-county scene in 1958 as a member of the Tipperary senior inter-county team. That year he won his first Munster title following a trouncing of Waterford in the provincial final. Nealon later lined out in his first All-Ireland final with Galway providing the opposition. The game turned into a rout as Tipp scored four goals against the wind in the first-half, including a goal scored by Nealon. Tipp won the game by ten points giving Nealon his first All-Ireland medal. In 1959 Nealon began the year by winning his first National Hurling League title. It was the first of a three-in-a-row for Tipp and Nelaon made a huge contribution to all those victories. Although he tasted league success Tipp made an early exit from the 1959 championship.

Tipp bounced back in 1960 by defeating arch-rivals Cork in the provincial final giving Nealon a second Munster medal. He later lined out in his second All-Ireland final where Wexford provided the opposition, however, it was the Wexford men who emerged victorious on that occasion. The game ended in a farce as the crowd invaded the pitch thinking that the game was over. As a result, Tipp finished the game with only twelve men on the field. In 1961 Nealon captured a third Munster title as Tipp trounced Cork in the provincial final. A Dublin team made up entirely of Dublin natives for the first time ever provided the opposition. The game was a close affair, however, Tipp emerged as the winners by a single point giving Nealon a second All-Ireland title. In 1962 he won a fourth Munster medal as Waterford fell heavily in the final. Once again Tipp faced Wexford in the All-Ireland final. Things looked good for the Munster champions as they scored two goals inside the first minute, however, Wexford came storming back. Tipp went on to win the game by two points giving Nealon a third All-Ireland medal. Three-in-a-row proved beyond even this great team as Tipp were beaten in the 1963 Munster final.

In 1964 Nealon won his fourth National league medal with Tipp before capturing a fifth Munster title. After their trouncing of Cork the All-Ireland final saw Tipp take on Kilkenny. 'The Cats', as reigning champions were the favourites, however, Tipp had something to say about that. Nealon played the game of his life and scored three of Tipp's five goals. It was a walk in the park for Tipp as Kilkenny fell heavily and Nealon won a fourth All-Ireland medal. In 1965 he captured a fifth National League medal before winning his sixth provincial medal. Wexford lined out against Tipp in the All-Ireland final, however, victory went to the Munster men as Nealon won a fifth All-Ireland title. Two years later in 1967 Nealon won his seventh Munster medal as Clare were defeated heavily. The All-Ireland final saw Tipp take on Kilkenny. History was on Tipp's side as the county hadn't been beaten by 'the Cats' since 1922. After 45 years Kilkenny scored three goals at vital times to capture a historic win. Tipp bounced back in 1968 with Nealon winning a sixth National League title and an eighth Munster medal. For the fourth time that decade Tipp faced Wexford in the championship decider. Things looked to be going well for Tipp as they were eight points ahead at half-time. Wexford came storming back to win the game by just two points. Nealon retired from inter-county hurling in 1969 following a defeat in the Munster final to Cork.

=== Provincial ===
Nealon also won Railway Cup titles with Munster in 1959, 1963, 1966 and 1968.

== Post-playing career ==
Since his retirement from play, Nealon has continued to contribute to the Gaelic Athletic Association as a referee and a selector to the Tipperary All-Ireland winning teams of 1971, 1989 and 1991. A keen tactician and student of the game, ever alert as coach and mentor, his late intervention during a break in play in the Munster final of 1971 in FitzGerald Stadium had a significant effect. On a day of incessant rain, he surreptitiously introduced a dry slither for Michael 'Babs' Keating to use in a close-in free which the wily Keating converted to a goal. This spurred Tipperary to victory over Limerick after a titanic struggle.

An efficient administrator, Nealon also served as Secretary of the Munster Council of the Gaelic Athletic Association from 1977 until 2004.

Awards
Preceded by Liam Devaney (Tipperary)	Texaco Hurler of the Year; 1962	Succeeded by Séamus Cleere (Kilkenny)
Achievements
Preceded by Jim O'Regan (Cork)	All-Ireland SHC winning manager 1971	Succeeded by Fr. Tommy Maher (Kilkenny)
