= 1961 All-Ireland Senior Hurling Championship final =

1961 All-Ireland Senior Hurling Final
- Event: 1961 All-Ireland Senior Hurling Championship
Tipperary	Dublin
0-16	1-12
- Date: 3 September 1961
- Venue: Croke Park, Dublin
- Referee: G. Fitzgerald (Limerick)
- Attendance: 67,866

The 1961 All-Ireland Senior Hurling Championship Final was the 74th All-Ireland Final and the culmination of the 1961 All-Ireland Senior Hurling Championship, an inter-county hurling tournament for the top teams in Ireland. The match was held at Croke Park, Dublin, on 3 September 1961, between Tipperary and Dublin. The Leinster champions lost to their Munster opponents on a scoreline of 0-16 to 1-12.

== Match details ==
3 September 1961
15:15 IST

Tipperary	0-16 – 1-12	Dublin

Croke Park, Dublin
Attendance: 67,866
Referee: G. Fitzgerald (Limerick)
