= 1953 All-Ireland Minor Hurling Championship =

All-Ireland Minor Hurling Championship 1953
All Ireland Champions
- Winners: Tipperary (8th win)
- Captain: Billy Quinn

All Ireland Runners-up
- Runners-up: Dublin

Provincial Champions
- Munster: Tipperary
- Leinster: Dublin
- Ulster: Antrim
- Connacht: Galway

The 1953 All-Ireland Minor Hurling Championship was the 23rd staging of the All-Ireland Minor Hurling Championship since its establishment by the Gaelic Athletic Association in 1928.

Tipperary entered the championship as the defending champions.

On 6 September 1953 Tipperary won the championship following an 8-6 to 3-6 defeat of Dublin in the All-Ireland final. This was their second All-Ireland title in-a-row and their eighth overall.

== Results ==
=== All-Ireland Minor Hurling Championship ===
Semi-finals

| 9 August 1953 Semi-final | Tipperary | 5-12 - 0-04 | Antrim | Croke Park, Dublin |

| 16 August 1953 Semi-final | Dublin | 6-07 - 3-04 | Galway | Croke Park, Dublin |

Final

| 6 September 1953 Final | Tipperary | 8-06 - 3-06 | Dublin | Croke Park, Dublin |
