= Edmond Ned Hayes =

Irish hurler

Ned Hayes
Personal information
- Native name: Éamonn Ó hAodha (Irish)
- Born: 1876 Two-Mile-Borris, County Tipperary
- Died: 1946 (aged 69–70) Two-Mile-Borris, County Tipperary
- Occupation: Farmer

Sport
- Sport: Hurling
- Position: Forward
Club
- Years: Club
- 1890s-1910s: Moycarkey–Borris
Club titles
- Tipperary titles: 4
Inter-county
- Years: County
- 1899-1905: Tipperary
Inter-county titles
- Munster titles: 2
- All-Irelands: 1

Edmond "Ned" Hayes (1876-1946) was an Irish hurler who played as a forward for the Tipperary senior team.

Hayes made his first appearance for the team during the 1899 championship and was a regular member of the starting for the next few seasons. During that time he won one All-Ireland medal and two Munster medals. In 1900, Hayes captained the team to the All-Ireland title.

At club level Hayes was a multiple county championship medalist with Moycarkey–Borris.

Sporting positions
Preceded by Tim Condon	Tipperary Senior Hurling Captain; 1900	Succeeded by Watty Dunne
Achievements
Preceded by Tim Condon (Tipperary)	All-Ireland Senior Hurling Final winning captain 1900	Succeeded by Jack Coughlan (London)
