= Terry Kelly (hurler) =

Irish hurler (1934–2019)

Personal information
- Native name: Traolach Ó Ceallaigh (Irish)
- Born: 1934 Tracton, County Cork, Ireland
- Died: 25 November 2019 (aged 85) Blackrock, Cork, Ireland
- Occupation: Garda superintendent
- Height: 6 ft 0 in (183 cm)

Sport
- Sport: Hurling
- Position: Full-forward
Clubs
- Years: Club
- Tracton; Éire Óg; Blackrock
Club titles
- Cork titles: 0
Inter-county
Years	County	Apps (scores)
1953–1963	Cork	17 (4-14)
Inter-county titles
- Munster titles: 1
- All-Irelands: 0
- NHL: 0

Terence Kelly (1934 – 25 November 2019) was an Irish hurler who played for a number of clubs, including Tracton and Blackrock in Cork and Éire Óg in Dublin. He played for the Cork senior hurling team at various times between 1953 and 1963, during which time he usually lined out as a forward.

== Playing career ==
=== St. Finbarr's College ===
Kelly first came to prominence as a hurler with St. Finbarr's College in Cork. Having played in every grade as a hurler, he was eventually appointed captain of the college's senior hurling team. On 2 March 1952, Kelly captained the team from midfield to a 1-05 to 1-03 defeat by St. Flannan's College in the Harty Cup final.

=== Cork ===
==== Minor and junior ====
Kelly first played for Cork when he was selected for the minor team in advance of the 1951 Munster Championship. He made his first appearance for the team on 1 July 1951 when he lined out at right corner-forward in Cork's 1-09 to 2-03 defeat of Clare. On 29 July 1951, Kelly won a Munster Championship medal after again lining out at right corner-forward in Cork's 5-11 to 1-03 defeat of Limerick in the final. On 2 September 1951, he was again selected at right corner-forward when Cork faced Galway in the All-Ireland final. Kelly scored a goal from play and claimed a winners' medal after the 4-05 to 1-08 victory.

Kelly was once again eligible for the minor grade in 1952, while he was also selected for the Cork junior hurling team. He made his debut in that grade on 3 August 1952 in a 6-06 to 2-06 Munster final defeat by Limerick.

On 12 July 1953, Kelly lined out in a second successive Munster final. He scored two goals from right corner-forward in the 5-05 to 4-08 draw with Tipperary. Kelly was ruled ineligible for the replay as he had been selected for the Cork senior team.

==== Senior ====
After impressing in the junior grade, Kelly was a late inclusion at right corner-forward on the Cork senior team for the Munster final against Tipperary on 26 July 1953. He ended the game with his first winners' medal after the 3-10 to 1-11 victory. Kelly was subsequently dropped from starting fifteen and was not included on the panel for the All-Ireland final defeat of Galway.

Kelly was recalled to the Cork senior team during the 1955-56 National League. On 22 July 1956, he won a second Munster Championship medal after scoring a point from full-forward in the 5-05 to 3-05 defeat of Limerick in the final. Kelly was again selected at full-forward and scored a point from play in the 2-12 to 2-08 All-Ireland final defeat by Wexford on 22 September 1956.

On 14 July 1957, Kelly lined out in his third Munster final. Lining out at full-forward, he scored a point from play in the 1-11 to 1-06 defeat by Waterford.

On 26 July 1959, Kelly was confined to the substitutes' bench, in spite of lining out on the starting fifteen in the previous game, when Cork again faced Waterford in the Munster final. He remained as an unused substitute in the 3-09 to 2-09 defeat.

On 1 May 1960, Cork qualified to play Tipperary in the final of the 1959-60 National League. Kelly scored a point from centre-forward but ended the game on the losing side after a 2-15 to 3-08 defeat. He was switched to midfield when both sides faced each other in the Munster final on 31 July 1960. Kelly scored a point from play in the 4-13 to 4-11 defeat.

For the second year in succession, Cork faced Tipperary in the Munster final on 30 July 1961. Kelly lined out at left wing-forward but ended the game on the losing side after a 3-06 to 0-07 defeat.

On 6 May 1962, Kelly lined out at midfield when Cork qualified to play Kilkenny in the final of the 1961-62 National League. He ended the game on the losing side after the 1-16 to 1-08 defeat.

Kelly played his last game for Cork on 30 June 1963 in a 4-07 to 1-11 defeat by Tipperary in the Munster semi-final.

== Honours ==
Cork

- Munster Senior Hurling Championship (2): 1953, 1956
- All-Ireland Minor Hurling Championship (1): 1951
- Munster Minor Hurling Championship (1): 1951

Munster

- Railway Cup (3): 1957, 1959, 1961
