= Tipperary–Wexford hurling rivalry =

Tipperary-Wexford
- Location: County Tipperary; County Wexford
- Teams: Tipperary; Wexford
- First meeting: 24 March 1901; Tipp. 3–12 – 1–4 Wex. 1899 All-Ireland final
- Latest meeting: 28 July 2019; Tipp. 1–28 – 3–20 Wex. 2019 All-Ireland semi-final
- Next meeting: TBD

Statistics
- Total meetings: 12
- Top scorer: Eoin Kelly (0–25)
- All-time series: Tipperary: 8 Drawn: 1 Wexford: 3
- Largest victory: 24 March 1901; Tipp. 3–12 – 1–4 Wex. 1899 All-Ireland final 3 July 2010; Tipp. 3–24 – 0–19 Wex. 2010 All-Ireland qualifier

The Tipperary-Wexford rivalry is a hurling rivalry between Irish county teams Tipperary and Wexford, who first played each other in 1951. The fixture has been an irregular one due to both teams playing in separate provinces. Tipperary's home ground is Semple Stadium and Wexford's home ground is Innovate Wexford Park, however, all bar one of their championship meetings have been held at neutral venues, usually Croke Park.

While Tipperary are regarded as one of the "big three" of hurling, with Cork and Kilkenny completing the trio, Wexford are ranked joint fifth in the all-time roll of honour and have enjoyed sporadic periods of dominance at various stages throughout the history of the championship. The two teams have won a combined total of 32 All-Ireland Senior Hurling Championship titles.

As of 2014 Tipperary and Wexford have met eleven times in the hurling championship including meeting five times at the All Ireland final stage. Tipperary hold the upper hand having recorded seven victories to Wexford's three. There has been one drawn game.

== History ==
=== 1899: Inaugural clash ===
The delayed 1899 All-Ireland final between Tipperary and Wexford took place on 24 March 1901 at Jones's Road. Tipperary were held for the first quarter of the game before taking a 2–6 to 1–3 interval lead. The match ended with disbandment as the Wexford players walked off the field with ten minutes remaining as they could not find a substitute to replace an injured player.

=== 1951: Tipp halt Wexford's arrival ===
In 1951 Wexford made a long-overdue breakthrough when they captured the Leinster title for the first time in thirty-three years before later facing Tipperary in the All-Ireland decider on 2 September 1951. Wexford had the better of the opening exchanges when Nicky Rackard scored two goals to give his side a 2–3 to 0–4 lead at the end of the first quarter. Tipperary responded with goals from Séamus Bannon, Tim Ryan and Ned Ryan to give the three-in-a-row hopefuls an interval lead of 3–6 to 2–6. Wexford tested the Tipperary defence after the restart, however, goalkeeper Tony Reddin made a number of saves to keep his side in it as Sonny Maher got a fourth goal for Tipperary after ten minutes. Three rapid goals in a spell between the 21st and 25th minutes from Tim Ryan, Bannon and Mick Ryan put the result beyond doubt and Tipperary secured their third successive All-Ireland following a 7–7 to 3–9 victory.

=== 1960–1968: The rivalry of the decade ===
On 4 September 1960 Tipperary entered the All-Ireland final against Wexford as red-hot favourites, however, a bumper crowd of 77,154 witnessed one of the biggest shocks in the history of the championship. Wexford scored the first point from the stick of Oliver "Hopper" McGrath inside the opening minute and never surrendered that lead. Tipperary trailed by 1–7 to 0–8 at the interval, however, it was Wexford who got the better start when McGrath struck for a goal. The game ended with a pitch invasion but was eventually cleared as Wexford became the first team to beat Tipperary in an All-Ireland final since 1922.

Two years later on 2 September 1962, Tipperary and Wexford contested the 75th All-Ireland final. Tom Moloughney and Seán McLoughlin netted early goals for Tipperary, however, they were unable to pull away from Wexford. Ned Wheeler levelled the scored with a 24th-minute goal, however, Tipperary finished stronger to secure a 2–16 to 1–6 half-time lead. Tipperary had a promising restart, however, Jimmy O'Brien scored a second goal for Wexford and they looked likely winners. Disaster struck for Tipperary when ace marksman Jimmy Doyle had the withdraw with a broken collarbone. Tom Ryan stepped into the breach for Tipperary's third goal to secure a 3–10 to 2–11 victory.

On 5 September 1965 Tipperary faced Wexford in the hope of claiming a fourth All-Ireland crown in five years. A two-goal burst from Seán McLoughlin helped Tipperary to an interval lead of 2–5 to 0–6. At the three-quarter stage Tipperary edged ahead by 2–11 to 0–9 and all hope of Wexford revival ended. Tipperary pushed on to secure the title with a final score of 2–16 to 0–10.

For the fourth and final time of the decade, Tipperary and Wexford clashed in an All-Ireland decider on 1 September 1968. Wexford could do little right in the opening thirty minutes and they trailed by 1–11 to 1–3 at the interval. A series of team switches at half time, including the introduction of John Quigley, helped transform the Leinster champions. Tony Doran exercised a decisive influence and goaled for Wexford after six minutes. A Paul Lynch free brought Wexford on level terms with Tipperary shortly after. Jack Berry scored Wexford's fourth goal after an initial save from Tipperary 'keeper John O'Donoghue. Eight minutes from time Tony Doran was in for his second and Wexford's fifth goal of the game. Tipperary fought back, however, goals from Seán McLoughlin and Michael "Babs" Keating weren't enough to halt one of the greatest comebacks in the history of the championship, as Wexford secured a 5–8 to 3–12 victory.

=== 1997–2001: Tipperary dominance ===
After an absence of almost thirty years Tipperary and Wexford renewed their rivalry on 17 August 1997 in their very first All-Ireland semi-final meeting. Wexford were the reigning champions while Tipperary were reaping the benefits of the new "back door system" as defeated provincial finalists. Goals were key as Wexford's renaissance was brought to a premature end following a 2–16 to 0–15 victory for Tipperary.

On 12 August 2001 Wexford were reaping the benefits of the "back door" when they faced Munster champions Tipperary in the All-Ireland semi-final. The opening stages of the game were fiercely fought, with the teams exchanging points to leave the score at 0–5 apiece after twenty-two minutes. Subsequent points from Mark O'Leary and Eoin Kelly put daylight between the two sides while a John Carroll goal helped Tipperary to a 1–9 to 0–5 interval lead. On the restart Tipperary soon extended the lead by 1–12 to 0–6 before Wexford pegged a goal back from Larry O'Gorman. A mix-up in the Tipperary defence let Rory McCarthy in for a second Wexford goal to leave the game finely poised at 1–13 to 2–6. With the score standing at 1–16 to 2–8 with only five minutes to go, it looked like favourites Tipperary had weathered the Wexford storm, however, Larry O'Gorman goaled again to leave just two points separating the teams. An Adrian Fenlon point a minute later ensured a frantic finale as the match entered added time. Wexford, however, were not to be denied a second attempt as a Mitch Jordan point in the 73rd minute ensured a remarkable draw.

The replay six days later on 18 August 2001 was played in atrocious conditions. Both teams struggled to deal with the wet and windy conditions but John Carroll broke the deadlock for Tipperary in the ninth minute by powerfully bursting through and kicking past Wexford 'keeper Damien Fitzhenry for a goal. Tipperary went six points ahead, however, Wexford then scored five points without reply from Paul Codd, Mitch Jordan and Larry Murphy, to bring the Slaneysiders to within a point. A series of physical tussles led to Tipperary's Brian O'Meara and Wexford's Liam Dunne being sent off. Moments later, Wexford's Mitch Jordan was also ordered off for lashing out. The game was well poised at Tipperary 1–6 Wexford 0–8 going into half-time, but Tipperary used their extra man brilliantly in the second half. Wexford only managed to score two points in the rest of the game, as Tipperary put the game well beyond doubt with Eugene O'Neill scoring two goals to secure a 3–12 to 0–10 victory.

=== 2007–2010: Honours even in two meetings ===
On 28 July 2007 Tipperary faced Wexford, a team generally viewed as the softest team left in the championship, in the All-Ireland quarter-final. Wexford squandered numerous goal opportunities in the opening half, while Tipperary goalkeeper Gerry Kennedy brought off a fantastic save from a piledriver from Stephen Nolan. Eight wides they accumulated, however, their goal came in the 18th minute when a long high ball was touched home by Rory Jacob. Within a minute Lar Corbett crashed the sliotar past Damien Fitzhenry at the other end to give Tipperary a 1–8 to 1–5 half-time lead. Three minutes into the second half Barry Lambert bagged Wexford's second goal. Seven times the teams were level in the second half and it looked as if the game was heading to a replay. With just a minute to go on the clock Darren Stamp caught a long ball on the 20-metre line in front of the Canal End and was subsequently fouled. A Tipperary player then spoke out of turn, the ball was moved in and Wexford goalkeeper and captain Damien Fitzhenry made his way up to take the free. His goal had Wexford leading by 3–9 to 1–14. Eoin Quigley added another point to secure a 3–10 to 1–14 victory and a first Wexford defeat of Tipperary in thirty-nine years.

After facing provincial defeats, Tipperary and Wexford met in a do-or-die qualifier on 3 July 2010. The game began with an off-the-ball skirmish involving Tipperary full-back Declan Fanning and Wexford full-forward Stephen Banville which resulted in two yellow cards. Tipperary subsequently coasted to a 0–15 to 0–7 half-time lead. The game was effectively over as a contest just three minutes into the second half. Eoin Kelly grabbed a quick brace of points from play before, in the space of a minute, Lar Corbett cracked home his two goals. The final score of 3–24 to 0–19 got Tipperary's season back on track while Wexford exited the championship.

== Statistics ==
Up to date as of 2023 season

Team	All-Ireland	Provincial	National League	Total
Wexford	6	21	4	31
Tipperary	28	42	19	89
Combined	34	63	23	120

== All time results ==
=== Legend ===
Tipperary win
Wexford win
Draw

=== Senior ===
No.	Date	Winners	Score	Runners-up	Venue	Competition
1.	24 March 1901	Tipperary (1)	3–12 – 1–4	Wexford	Jones's Road	All-Ireland final
2.	2 September 1951	Tipperary (2)	7–7 – 3–9	Wexford	Croke Park	All-Ireland final
3.	4 September 1960	Wexford (1)	2–15 – 0–11	Tipperary	Croke Park	All-Ireland final
4.	2 September 1962	Tipperary (3)	3–10 – 2–11	Wexford	Croke Park	All-Ireland final
5.	5 September 1965	Tipperary (4)	2–16 – 0–10	Wexford	Croke Park	All-Ireland final
6.	1 September 1968	Wexford (2)	5–8 – 3–12	Tipperary	Croke Park	All-Ireland final
7.	17 August 1997	Tipperary (5)	2–16 – 0–15	Wexford	Croke Park	All-Ireland semi-final
8.	12 August 2001	Tipperary	1–16 – 3–10	Wexford	Croke Park	All-Ireland semi-final
9.	18 August 2001	Tipperary (6)	3–12 – 0–10	Wexford	Croke Park	All-Ireland semi-final replay
10.	28 July 2007	Wexford (3)	3–10 – 1–14	Tipperary	Croke Park	All-Ireland quarter-final
11.	3 July 2010	Tipperary (7)	3–24 – 0–19	Wexford	Semple Stadium	All-Ireland qualifier
12.	28 July 2019	Tipperary (8)	1–28 – 3–20	Wexford	Croke Park	All-Ireland semi-final

=== National League ===
No.	Date	Winners	Score	Runners-up	Venue	Competition
	19 April 1998	Wexford	2–13 – 0–10	Tipperary	Enniscorthy	Round 5
	21 March 1999	Tipperary	1–16 – 1–8	Wexford	Semple Stadium	Round 3
	12 March 2000	Tipperary	0–20 – 1–15	Wexford	Enniscorthy	Round 3
	18 February 2001	Tipperary	1–16 – 1–12	Wexford	Semple Stadium	Round 3
	18 March 2002	Wexford	3–13 – 1–10	Tipperary	Wexford Park	Round 3
	16 March 2003	Tipperary	3–21 – 1–11	Wexford	MacDonagh Park	Round 3
	14 March 2004	Tipperary	4–18 – 1–13	Wexford	Wexford Park	Round 3
	13 March 2005	Wexford	2–19 – 2–15	Tipperary	Semple Stadium	Round 3
	17 April 2011	Tipperary	0–17 – 1–14	Wexford	Semple Stadium	Round 7
	16 April 2017	Tipperary	5–18 – 1–19	Wexford	Nowlan Park	League Semi-Finals
	17 February 2018	Tipperary	3–21 – 1–21	Wexford	Semple Stadium	Round 3
	17 February 2019	Wexford	1–15 – 1–14	Tipperary	Innovate Wexford Park	Round 3

=== Intermediate ===
No.	Date	Winners	Score	Runners-up	Venue	Competition
1.	14 August 1961	Wexford	5–6 – 5–6	Tipperary	Nowlan Park	All-Ireland home final
2.	21 August 1961	Wexford (1)	4–11 – 3–9	Tipperary	Nowlan Park	All-Ireland home final replay
3.	18 August 1963	Tipperary (1)	0–17 – 2–3	Wexford	Walsh Park	All-Ireland home final

=== Junior ===
No.	Date	Winners	Score	Runners-up	Venue	Competition
1.	12 December 1926	Tipperary (1)	5–3 – 1–1	Wexford	O'Kennedy Park	All-Ireland final
2.	18 August 1985	Wexford (1)	3–9 – 1–13	Tipperary	Nowlan Park	All-Ireland final

=== Under-21 ===
No.	Date	Winners	Score	Runners-up	Venue	Competition
1.	4 October 1964	Tipperary (1)	8–9 – 3–1	Wexford	Nowlan Park	All-Ireland final
2.	12 September 1965	Wexford (1)	3–7 – 1–4	Tipperary	Nowlan Park	All-Ireland final

=== Minor ===
No.	Date	Winners	Score	Runners-up	Venue	Competition
1.	7 September 1980	Tipperary (1)	2–15 – 1–10	Wexford	Croke Park	All-Ireland final
2.	8 August 1999	Tipperary (2)	3–13 – 1–8	Wexford	Croke Park	All-Ireland semi-final
3.	11 August 2002	Tipperary (3)	4–13 – 0–13	Wexford	Croke Park	All-Ireland semi-final
4.	25 July 2009	Tipperary (4)	0–20 – 0–19	Wexford	O'Moore Park	All-Ireland quarter-final

== Records ==
=== Scorelines ===
- Biggest championship win:
  - For Tipperary:
    - Tipperary 3–12 – 1–4 Wexford, 1899 All-Ireland final, Jones's Road, 24 March 1901
    - Tipperary 3–24 – 0–19 Wexford, 2010 All-Ireland qualifier, Semple Stadium, 3 July 2010
  - For Wexford:
    - Wexford 2–15 – 0–11 Tipperary, 1960 All-Ireland final, Croke Park, 4 September 1960
- Highest aggregate:
  - Tipperary 3–24 – 0–19 Wexford, 2010 All-Ireland qualifier, Semple Stadium, 3 July 2010

=== Top scorers ===
Team	Player	Score	Total
Tipperary	Eoin Kelly	0–25	25
Wexford	Paul Codd	0–19	19

- Top scorer in a single game:
  - For Tipperary:
    - Eoin Kelly (0–9), Tipperary 3–12 – 0–10 Wexford, 2010 All-Ireland semi-final replay, Croke Park, 18 August 2001
    - Lar Corbett (2–3), Tipperary 3–24 – 0–19 Wexford, All-Ireland qualifier, Semple Stadium, 3 July 2010
  - For Wexford:
    - Nicky Rackard (3–2), Tipperary 7–7 – 3–9 Wexford, All-Ireland final, Croke Park, 2 September 1951

=== Attendances ===
- Highest attendance:
  - 77,154 – Wexford 2–15 – 0–11 Tipperary, All-Ireland final, Croke Park, 4 September 1960
- Lowest attendance:
  - c.3,500 – Tipperary 3–12 – 1–4 Wexford, All-Ireland final, Jones's Road, 24 March 1901
