= Tom McGarry =

Irish hurler, footballer, and rugby union player (1937–2021)

Personal information
- Native name: Tomás Mag Fhearaigh (Irish)
- Born: 1937 Limerick, Ireland
- Died: 2 December 2021 (aged 74) Limerick, Ireland

Sport
- Sport: Gaelic football
- Position: Left wing-back
Club
- Years: Club
- Treaty Sarsfields
Club titles
- Limerick titles: 0
Inter-county
- Years: County
- 1956–1963: Limerick
Inter-county titles
- Munster titles: 0
- All-Irelands: 0
- NHL: 0

Thomas P. McGarry (1937 – 2 December 2021) was an Irish hurler, footballer and rugby union player. An all-round sportsman he played with a number of teams in all codes, including the Limerick senior hurling team, Cork Celtic and Young Munster.

== Career ==
McGarry first came to sporting prominence as a hurler. A member of the Treaty Sarsfields club, he also represented CBS Sexton Street in the Harty Cup while also enjoying a two-year spell with the Limerick minor hurling team. McGarry made his senior debut in 1956, however, his seven-year career coincided with a barren spell for Limerick. In spite of this he earned selection on the Munster team and won five Railway Cup medals in a six-year period. McGarry also played rugby and association football at a high level. Playing in the centre, he captained Young Munster when they played Garryowen in the 1970-71 Munster Senior Cup final. McGarry also played League of Ireland soccer with Limerick F.C. and Cork Celtic.

== Death ==
McGarry died on 2 December 2021.

== Honours ==
Treaty Sarsfields

- Limerick Senior Football Championship: 1956, 1957, 1963

Munster

- Railway Cup: 1958, 1959, 1960, 1961, 1963
