= Jim Walsh (Kilkenny hurler) =

Irish hurler

Jim "Link" Walsh
Personal information
- Native name: Séamus Breathnach (Irish)
- Nickname: Link
- Born: 15 August 1933 Dunnamaggin, County Kilkenny, Ireland
- Died: 31 July 1995 (aged 61) St. Luke's Hospital, Kilkenny, Ireland
- Occupation: Farmer
- Height: 6 ft 0 in (183 cm)

Sport
- Sport: Hurling
- Position: Full-back
Clubs
- Years: Club
- John Locke's; Dunnamaggin; Near South
Club titles
- Kilkenny titles: 0
Inter-county
- Years: County
- 1957-1963: Kilkenny
Inter-county titles
- Leinster titles: 3
- All-Irelands: 1
- NHL: 1

James Walsh (15 August 1933 – 31 July 1995) was an Irish hurler. At club level he played with Dunnamaggin, John Locke's and a Near South selection and was an All-Ireland Championship winner with the Kilkenny senior hurling team.

== Playing career ==
Walsh first came to prominence at inter-county level during a two-year stint with the Kilkenny minor team. He was a sub on the 1950 side that beat Tipperary in the All-Ireland final, and he was on the 1951 team that fell to Galway. Later, in 1956, he sampled All-Ireland success at junior level, with his brother Tom lining out alongside him at corner-back. The pair assumed the same positions for the Kilkenny senior team in 1957. Walsh went on to win his only senior All-Ireland title that year after beating Waterford in the final. His other honours at senior level include three Leinster Championships and a National Hurling League title. Walsh's grandnephew, Brian Hogan, was Kilkenny's All-Ireland-winning captain in 2011.

== Later life and death ==
Walsh, who remained unmarried throughout his life, worked as a farmer with his brother Pat in Dunnamaggin. He died on 31 July 1995 after suffering a massive seizure while working on his farm.

== Honours ==
Kilkenny

- All-Ireland Senior Hurling Championship (1): 1957
- Leinster Senior Hurling Championship (3): 1957, 1958, 1959
- National Hurling League (1): 1961-62
- Oireachtas Cup (2): 1957, 1959
- Walsh Cup (5): 1957, 1958, 1959, 1961, 1962
- All-Ireland Junior Hurling Championship (1): 1956
- Leinster Junior Hurling Championship (1): 1956
- All-Ireland Minor Hurling Championship (1): 1950
- Leinster Minor Hurling Championship (2): 1950, 1951
