= Pa Dillon =

Irish hurler

Personal information
- Native name: Pádraig Diolún (Irish)
- Nickname: Pa
- Born: 1938 Freshford, County Kilkenny, Ireland
- Died: 14 June 2013 Freshford, County Kilkenny, Ireland
- Occupation: Farmer
- Height: 6 ft 1 in (185 cm)

Sport
- Sport: Hurling
- Position: Full-back
Club
- Years: Club
- St Lachtain's
Club titles
- Kilkenny titles: 2
Inter-county
Years	County	Apps (scores)
1960–1972	Kilkenny	25 (0-00)
Inter-county titles
- Leinster titles: 6
- All-Irelands: 3
- NHL: 1

Patrick "Pa" Dillon (1938 – 14 June 2013) was an Irish hurler who played as a full-back for the Kilkenny senior team.

Born in Freshford, County Kilkenny, Dillon first played competitive hurling in various juvenile grades. He arrived on the inter-county scene at the age of seventeen when he first linked up with the Kilkenny minor team. He made his senior debut in a 1960 tournament game but had to wait until the 1964 championship before he became a regular. Dillon went on to play a key part for Kilkenny during a successful era for the team, and won three All-Ireland medals, six Leinster medals and one National Hurling League medal.

Dillon represented the Leinster inter-provincial team on a number of occasions throughout his career, winning Railway Cup medals in 1965 and 1972. At the club level, he won two championship medals with St Lachtain's.

Cited by many of his hurling peers as one of the best full-backs of his generation, Dillon won two Cú Chulainn. He was later named in the full-back position on the Kilkenny Hurling Team of the Century.

== Playing career ==
=== Club ===
Dillon played his club hurling with the St Lachtain's club in Freshford and enjoyed a very successful under-age career. He first came to prominence on the club's under-14 team that was defeated by Thomastown in the 'B' county final in 1951. Dillon's side built on this success and went on to secure the county under-14 title in 1952.

Dillon subsequently joined the St Lachtain's under-16 team where he enjoyed further success. He added a winners' medal to his collection in this grade in 1954 when the club beat Thomastown by 4–6 to 2–3.

In the mid-1950s St Lachtain's became a major force on the club hurling scene at the minor level. Dillon was a key member of this team and lined out in his first county minor decider in 1954. Old rivals Thomastown provided the opposition and went on to defeat St. Lachtain's by 5–1 to 2–1.

St. Lachtain's reached the county minor final again in 1955, however, this time Glenmore were the opponents. A huge 8–5 to 4–5 score line gave Dillon's side the victory.

In 1956, Dillon was in his final year as a minor as St Lachtain's aimed to retain their title. The club reached the county final for the third year in succession. Thomastown provided the opposition and went on to secure an 8–4 to 5–3 victory.

Three years later in 1959, Dillon was at full back on the St Lachtain's junior hurling team that contested the county championship final in that grade. Once again it was a Thomastown selection that provided the opposition, however, after facing defeat to their old rivals at under-age levels, Dillon won a county junior championship title following a 4–7 to 4–2 victory.

Just two years after winning promotion from the junior grade St. Lachtain's reached the final of the county senior championship. The opponents were Near South; however, St Lachtain's ability to score goals while conceding none proved decisive in the 4–5 to 0–12 victory. It was Dillon's first senior county championship winners' medal.

After surrendering the title the following year, St Lachtain's reached the championship decider again in 1963. Tullogher provided the opposition; however, they were no match for Dillon's side as a 1–7 to 0–3 score line gave him a second county title.

=== Minor ===
Dillon's success at the club level brought him to the attention of the Kilkenny minor hurling selectors and he joined the team in 1955. That year he won a Leinster in the minor grade as Wexford were accounted for after a draw and a replay. Kilkenny was later beaten by Galway in the All-Ireland semi-final.

In 1956, Dillon added a second Leinster minor winners' medal to his collection as Wexford were defeated in the provincial decider once again. This victory allowed Kilkenny advance to the All-Ireland final where Tipperary were waiting. An absolute rout took place as Tipp won the game by 4–16 to 1–5.

=== Senior ===
Dillon's first senior outing in a Kilkenny jersey was against Waterford in a tournament game in 1960, however, it took him another few years to gain a permanent foothold in the county team. Jim 'Link Walsh was the regular full-back at the time while 'Cha' Whelan of Thomastown held the position for the 1963 championship. By 1964 Dillon had taken over the position and became the first-choice number three for the majority of the next decade.

That year Dillon won his first Leinster winners' medal in the senior grade following a huge win over Dublin. Staunch local rivals Tipperary later provided the opposition in the All-Ireland final, however, Kilkenny were the pundits' favourites to retain the title. Jimmy Doyle had other ideas, however, as he scored 10 points and set up Seán McLoughlin for a goal. Tipperary's fourteen-point winning margin, 5–13 to 2–8, was the biggest All-Ireland final win since Tipperary had overwhelmed Laois in the 1949 decider. It was a disappointing end to Dillon's debut season, however, he was subsequently presented with the Cú Chulainn award for best full-back of the season.

Kilkenny lost their provincial crown in 1965, however, Kilkenny bounced back in 1966 with Dillon collecting his first National Hurling League winners' medal and a second Leinster title. Dillon had been redeployed to the full-forward position for the season, however, the move proved short-lived. The provincial victory allowed Kilkenny to advance directly to the All-Ireland final where arch-rivals Cork provided the opposition. It was the first meeting of these two great sides since 1947 and 'the Cats' were installed as the firm favourites. In spite of this two goals by Colm Sheehan and a third from John O'Halloran gave Cork a merited 3–9 to 1–10 victory over an Eddie Keher-inspired Kilkenny. For the second time in three years Dillon found himself on the losing side on All-Ireland final day.

The following year Kilkenny continued their provincial dominance with Dillon picking up a third Leinster title before lining out in a third All-Ireland final at Croke Park. Tipperary were Kilkenny's opponents on the day, however, by this stage Tipp's pool of players was ageing and the county's hurling fortunes were in decline. Kilkenny proved more than a match for the Munster champions. Goals from Paddy Moran, Martin Brennan and Tom Walsh at vital times laid to rest a bogey that Tipperary had over Kilkenny since 1922. A 3–8 to 2–7 score line gave Dillon his first All-Ireland winners' medal. He later collected a second Cú Chulainn award.

Wexford put an end to Kilkenny's hopes of retaining the title in 1968, however, Kilkenny bounced back the following year with Dillon collecting a fourth Leinster medal. Cork faced Kilkenny in the subsequent All-Ireland final. For a while, it looked as if Cork would triumph over their rivals once again, however, five points from Kilkenny in the last seven minutes gave Dillon a second All-Ireland winners' medal.

Kilkenny lost their provincial and All-Ireland titles in 1970, however, 1971 saw Dillon capture a fifth provincial winners' medal as Kilkenny began to assert their dominance over Wexford. The Leinster champions later played Tipperary in the only eighty-minute final between these great rivals. The game has gone down in All-Ireland final folklore for a number of reasons. As the first All-Ireland final to be broadcast in colour by Telefís Éireann, the nation saw Eddie Keher score a remarkable 2–11 and still end up on the losing side. Kilkenny's ever-dependable goalkeeper, Ollie Walsh, had a nightmare of a game in which he conceded five goals, one of which passed through his legs, while that year's Hurler of the Year, Michael 'Babs' Keating, played out the closing stages of the game in his bare feet. After a thrilling game Tipp emerged the victors on a score line of 5–17 to 5–14.

In 1972, Keher won a seventh Leinster title following a victory over Wexford in a replay of the provincial final. Once again, Cork provided the opposition in the All-Ireland final, a game which is often considered to be one of the classic games of the modern era. Halfway through the second-half Cork were on form and stretched their lead to eight points. Drastic action was required and Kilkenny's star forward Eddie Keher was deployed closer to the Cork goal. He finished the game with a tally of 2–9 as 'the Cats' powered to a 3–24 to 5–11 victory. It was Dillon's fourth All-Ireland winners' medal. He retired from inter-county hurling following this victory.
