= John Maher (1950s Kilkenny hurler) =

Irish hurler (1933–1988)

Personal information
- Native name: Seán Ó Meachair (Irish)
- Born: 1933 Freshford, County Kilkenny, Ireland
- Died: 21 May 1988 (aged 55) Dundrum, Dublin, Ireland
- Occupation: Electrical engineer
- Height: 5 ft 10 in (178 cm)

Sport
- Sport: Hurling
- Position: Left corner-back
Club
- Years: Club
- Kilmacud Crokes
Club titles
- Kilkenny titles: 0
Inter-county
- Years: County
- 1954-1960: Kilkenny
Inter-county titles
- Leinster titles: 5
- All-Irelands: 1
- NHL: 1

John Maher (1933 – 21 May 1988) was an Irish hurler. At club level he played with Kilmacud Crokes and was an All-Ireland Championship winner with the Kilkenny senior hurling team.

== Playing career ==
Maher first came to prominence when he won senior and junior Leinster colleges medals with St. Kieran's College. He played for the Leinster senior colleges side in 1950 when Leinster won the inter-provincial title before later claiming Leinster and All-Ireland medals as a member of the Kilkenny minor team. Maher was still eligible to play for the minor team on 1951 but, having moved to the capital for work, a mix-up arose and he was unable to line out for Kilkenny. He won his first Leinster medal at senior level with Dublin in 1952 before transferring back to the Kilkenny senior team in 1957. Maher went on to win his only senior All-Ireland title that year after beating Waterford in the final. His other honours at senior level with Kilkenny include four Leinster Championships and a National Hurling League title. Maher was also selected for the Leinster and Ireland teams. With Kilmacud Crokes he won a senior county championship medal in 1966.

== Later life and death ==
Maher qualified as an electrical engineer in England and spent his entire working life with the ESB. He died at his home in Dundrum on 21 May 1988, at the age of 55.

== Honours ==
Kilmacud Crokes

- Dublin Senior Hurling Championship (1): 1966

Dublin

- Leinster Senior Hurling Championship (1): 1952

Kilkenny

- All-Ireland Senior Hurling Championship (1): 1957
- Leinster Senior Hurling Championship (4): 1953, 1957, 1958, 1959
- Leinster Minor Hurling Championship (1): 1950
