= Jack Harding (hurler) =

Irish hurler (1933–2020)

Personal information
- Native name: Seán Hairdín (Irish)
- Born: 23 June 1933 Curracloe, County Wexford, Ireland
- Died: 2 July 2020 (aged 87) Curracloe, County Wexford, Ireland
- Occupation: Farmer
- Height: 5 ft 9 in (175 cm)

Sport
- Sport: Hurling
- Position: Full-forward
Club
- Years: Club
- Shelmaliers
Club titles
- Wexford titles: 0
Inter-county
Years	County	Apps (scores)
1959–1960	Wexford	4 (0–01)
Inter-county titles
- Leinster titles: 1
- All-Irelands: 1
- NHL: 0

John Harding (23 June 1933 – 2 July 2020) was an Irish hurler. At club level he played with the Shelmaliers club and was an All-Ireland Championship winner with the Wexford senior hurling team in 1960.

== Playing career ==
Born in Curracloe, Harding first played hurling with his local Shelmaliers club, winning a county junior championship medal in 1954. After lining out at midfield for the Wexford junior team, he was drafted onto the senior team as full-forward for the 1960 Leinster Championship. Harding claimed a Leinster Championship medal that season before later winning an All-Ireland Championship medal after Wexford's shock win over Tipperary in the final. After a short-lived inter-county career, Harding continued to line out with Shelmaliers, with whom he won a second junior county championship title in 1966.

== Death ==
Harding died at his home in Curracloe on 2 July 2020. His wife predeceased him in 2005 and he was survived by his eight children.

== Honours ==
Shelmaliers

- Wexford Junior Hurling Championship (2): 1954, 1966

Wexford

- All-Ireland Senior Hurling Championship (1): 1960
- Leinster Senior Hurling Championship (1): 1960
