= Tom Walsh (Dunnamaggin hurler) =

Irish hurler (1931–2013)

Personal information
- Native name: Tomás Breathnach (Irish)
- Born: 1931 Dunnamaggin, County Kilkenny, Ireland
- Died: 5 September 2013 (aged 82) Callan, County Kilkenny, Ireland
- Occupation: Farmer
- Height: 5 ft 8 in (173 cm)

Sport
- Sport: Hurling
- Position: Right corner-back
Clubs
- Years: Club
- Carrickshock; Dunnamaggin
Club titles
- Kilkenny titles: 1
Inter-county
- Years: County
- 1957-1962: Kilkenny
Inter-county titles
- Leinster titles: 3
- All-Irelands: 1
- NHL: 1

Thomas Walsh (1931 – 5 September 2013) was an Irish hurler. He played with club sides Dunnamaggin and Carrickshock and was an All-Ireland Championship winner with the Kilkenny senior hurling team.

== Playing career ==
Walsh first came to prominence in 1951 when he won a senior county medal with Carrickshock before later joining the Dunnamaggin club. After lining out with the Kilkenny minor team during the 1949 Leinster Championship, he won an All-Ireland medal with the junior team in 1951. Walsh added another junior medal to his collection when winning the All Ireland title again in 1956, with his brother Jim lining out alongside him at full-back. The pair assumed the same positions for the Kilkenny senior team in 1957. Walsh went on to win his only senior All-Ireland title that year after beating Waterford in the final. His other honours at senior level include three Leinster Championships and a National Hurling League title. Walsh's grandnephew, Brian Hogan, was Kilkenny's All-Ireland-winning captain in 2011.

== Death ==
Walsh died in Callan, County Kilkenny on 5 September 2013, at the age of 82.

== Honours ==
Carrickshock

- Kilkenny Senior Hurling Championship (1): 1951

Kilkenny

- All-Ireland Senior Hurling Championship (1): 1957
- Leinster Senior Hurling Championship (3): 1957, 1958, 1959
- National Hurling League (1): 1961-62
- All-Ireland Junior Hurling Championship (2): 1951, 1956
- Leinster Junior Hurling Championship (2): 1951, 1956
