= Phil Duggan =

Irish hurler

Personal information
- Native name: Pilib Duagáin (Irish)
- Born: 1933 (age 92–93) Grenagh, County Cork, Ireland
- Occupation: Civil servant

Sport
- Sport: Hurling
- Position: Centre-back
Clubs
- Years: Club
- Grenagh; Civil Service
Club titles
- Cork titles: 0
Inter-county*
Years	County	Apps (scores)
1958-1963	Cork	8 (0-01)
Inter-county titles
- Munster titles: 0
- All-Irelands: 0
- NHL: 0
- All Stars: 0
- *Inter County team apps and scores correct as of 19:25, 4 March 2019.

Philip Duggan (born 1933) is an Irish retired hurler who played for Mid Cork Championship club Grenagh, Dublin Championship club Civil Service and at inter-county level with the Cork senior hurling team. He usually lined out as a centre-back.

Duggan began his hurling career at club level with Grenagh. He enjoyed his greatest success with the club when he was part of the 1951 Cork Minor Championship-winning team. Duggan later joined the Civil Service club in Dublin, winning a Dublin Intermediate Championship in 1962.

At inter-county level, Duggan was part of the successful Cork minor team that won the All-Ireland Championship in 1951. He joined the Cork senior team in 1958. From his debut, Duggan was ever-present as a centre-back before later switching to midfield and made 8 Championship appearances in a career that ended with his last game in 1964.

At inter-provincial level, Duggan was selected to play in one championship campaigns with Munster, with his sole Railway Cup medal being won in 1961.

== Honours ==
Grenagh

- Cork Minor Hurling Championship (1): 1951

Civil Service

- Dublin Intermediate Hurling Championship (1): 1962

Cork

- All-Ireland Minor Hurling Championship (1): 1951
- Munster Minor Hurling Championship (1): 1951

Munster

- Railway Cup (1): 1961
