= Near South GAA =

Gaelic sports club in County Kilkenny, Ireland

Near South
- Cill Chainnigh Theas
- County: Kilkenny

Senior Club Championships
	All Ireland	Leinster champions	Kilkenny champions
Hurling:	0	0	0

Near South GAA was a Gaelic Athletic Association divisional team, located in the southern region of County Kilkenny, Ireland. The team was exclusively converned with the game of hurling.

== History ==
In 1961, the Kilkenny County Board permitted regional teams to participate in the Kilkenny SHC for the first time. These regional teams were composed of junior players and thus afforded every player in the county the chance of winning a senior championship medal. City Junior Division, Northern Division, Far South and Near South were the four regional teams.

Far South was made up of players from Dunnagammin, Knocktopher, Rower–Inistioge, St Vincent's, Thomastown and Thomastown Rangers. The team reached the 1961 Kilkenny SHC final, but was beaten by St Lachtain's by 4–05 to 0–12.

== Notable players ==
- Ollie Walsh: All-Ireland SHC-winner 1957, 1963, 1967, 1969, 1972)
- Denis Heaslip: All-Ireland SHC-winner (1957, 1963)
- Jim Walsh: All-Ireland SHC-winner (1957)
