= 1959 Railway Cup Hurling Championship =

Irish hurling competition

1959 Railway Cup
- Date: 17 March 1959 - 7 June 1959
- Teams: Connacht; Leinster; Munster
- Champions: Munster; Tony Wall (captain)
- Runners-up: Connacht; Séamus Cullinane (captain)

Tournament statistics
- Matches played: 2
- Goals scored: 14 (7 per match)
- Points scored: 38 (19 per match)
- Top scorer(s): Christy Ring (4-05)

The 1959 Railway Cup Hurling Championship was the 33rd series of the inter-provincial hurling Railway Cup. Two matches were played between 17 March 1959 and 7 June 1959 to decide the title. It was contested by Connacht, Leinster and Munster.

Munster entered the championship as the defending champions.

On 7 June 1959, Munster won the Railway Cup after a 7–11 to 2–06 defeat of Connacht in the final at Croke Park, Dublin. It was their third Railway Cup title in succession. The new Hogan Stand was officially opened on the day of the final.

Munster's Christy Ring was the Railway Cup top scorer with 4-05.

== Results ==
Semi-final

17 March 1959 Semi-final	Connacht	2-14 - 3-07	Leinster	Croke Park, Dublin
	T Sweeney 0-5, T Conway 1-1, P Egan 1-0, PJ Lally 0-2, J Salmon 0-2, PJ Lawless 0-2, M Cullinane 0-1, M Fox 0-1.		P Kehoe 1-2, N Wheeler 1-1, S Clohessy 1-0, F Whelan 0-1, W Dwyer 0-1, M Fleming 0-1, C O'Brien 0-1.	Attendance: 35,002; Referee: S Gleeson (Limerick)

Final

7 June 1959 Final	Munster	7-11 - 2-06	Connacht	Croke Park, Dublin
	C Ring 4-5, J Smyth 1-1, D Nealon 1-1, L Guinan 1-0, J Doyle 0-2, S Power 0-1, T Casey 0-1.		T Sweeney 1-3, P Egan 1-1, T Kelly 0-1, PJ Lawless 0-1.	Attendance: 23,248; Referee: E Conroy (Laois)

== Top scorers ==
Overall

Rank	Player	County	Tally	Total	Matches	Average
1	Christy Ring	Munster	4-05	17	1	17.00
2	Tim Sweeney	Connacht	1-08	11	2	5.50
3	Paddy Egan	Connacht	2-01	7	2	3.50

Single game

Rank	Player	County	Tally	Total	Opposition
1	Christy Ring	Munster	4-05	17	Connacht
2	Tim Sweeney	Connacht	1-03	6	Munster
3	Padge Kehoe	Leinster	1-02	5	Connacht
3	Tim Sweeney	Connacht	0-05	5	Munster
