= John Barron (hurler) =

Irish hurler

Personal information
- Native name: Seán de Barún (Irish)
- Born: 1934 Waterford, Ireland
- Died: 28 April 2008 (aged 74) Waterford, Ireland
- Occupation: Clerical officer

Sport
- Sport: Hurling
- Position: Corner-back, Full-forward
Club
- Years: Club
- De La Salle
Club titles
| | Football | Hurling |
| Waterford titles | 1 | 0 |
Inter-county
- Years: County
- 1954–1964: Waterford
Inter-county titles
- Munster titles: 3
- All-Irelands: 1
- NHL: 1

John Barron (1934–2008) was an Irish sportsman. He played hurling with his local club De La Salle and with the Waterford senior inter-county team from 1954 until 1964.

== Playing career ==
=== Club ===
Barron played his club hurling with his local De La Salle club. He never won a senior county title.

=== Inter-county ===
Barron first came to prominence on the inter-county scene in the late 1950s as a member of the Waterford senior hurling team. At this time, however, Tipperary and Cork were the kingpins of Munster hurling, with all the other counties only providing a supporting role. All this changed in 1957 when Barron won his first Munster title following a victory over reigning champions Cork. Waterford later played Kilkenny in the All-Ireland final, however, victory went to the men from Leinster on that occasion. Waterford were leading by six points with fifteen minutes left, however, the game ended 4–10 to 3–12. Two years later in 1959 Barron won a second provincial title. Once again Waterford lined out in the championship decider and once again Kilkenny provided the opposition. The game ended in a draw, however, when the two sides met for the replay the men from Waterford made no mistake in defeating their near rivals and Barron collected an All-Ireland medal. In 1963 he added a National Hurling League medal to his collection before winning a third Munster title. For the third successive time Kilkenny were Waterford's opponents in the All-Ireland final, however, the men from the Déise came back from an 11-point deficit but were still beaten by 'the Cats'. Barron retired from inter-county hurling in 1964.

=== Inter-provincial ===
Barron also lined out with Munster in the inter-provincial hurling competition. He captured four successive Railway Cup medals in 1958, 1959, 1960 and 1961.

== Post-playing career ==
John Barron died on 28 April 2008 aged 74.
