= Watty Dunne =

Irish hurler

Personal information
- Native name: Ualtar Ó Doinn (Irish)
- Born: Walter Dunne; 18 December 1879 Tubberadora, County Tipperary, Ireland
- Died: 9 June 1964 (aged 84) Tubberadora, County Tipperary, Ireland
- Occupation: Farm servant

Sport
- Sport: Hurling
Club
- Years: Club
- Tubberadora
Inter-county
- Years: County
- 1898-1905: Tipperary
Inter-county titles
- Munster titles: 3
- All-Irelands: 3

Walter Dunne (18 December 1879 – 9 June 1964) was an Irish sportsperson. He played hurling with his local club Tubberadora and was a member of the Tipperary senior hurling team between 1898 and 1905.

== Honours ==
Tipperary

- All-Ireland Senior Hurling Championship (3): 1898, 1899, 1900
- Munster Senior Hurling Championship (3): 1898, 1899, 1900

Sporting positions
Preceded by Ned Hayes	Tipperary Senior Hurling Captain; 1901	Succeeded by Jack Dwan
