= 1961 Kilkenny Senior Hurling Championship =

Annual hurling competition season

- Dates: 7 May – 17 September 1961
- Teams: 17
- Champions: St Lachtain's (1st title); Alfie Hickey (captain)
- Runners-up: Near South

Tournament statistics
- Matches played: 18
- Goals scored: 134 (7.44 per match)
- Points scored: 247 (13.72 per match)

The 1961 Kilkenny Senior Hurling Championship was the 67th staging of the Kilkenny Senior Hurling Championship since its establishment by the Kilkenny County Board in 1887. The championship ran from 7 May to 17 September 1961.

Bennettsbridge were the defending champions, however, they were beaten by Erin's Own in the second round.

The final was played on 17 September 1961 at Nowlan Park in Kilkenny, between St Lachtain's and first-time finalists Near South. St Lachtain's won the match by 4–05 to 0–12 to claim their first ever championship title.

== Team changes ==
=== To Championship ===
Promoted from the Kilkenny Junior Hurling Championship

- Lisdowney

== Results ==
=== Preliminary round ===
| 14 May 1961 Preliminary round | Far South | 7-07 - 3-12 | Tullogher | Mulinavat Grounds |

=== First round ===
| 7 May 1961 First round | Near South | 8-06 - 5-04 | Northern Division | Nowlan Park |

| 14 May 1961 First round | Erin's Own | 3-10 - 2-03 | Éire Óg | Nowlan Park |

| 14 May 1961 First round | Bennettsbridge | 7-07 - 4-04 | City Junior Division | Nowlan Park |

| 21 May 1961 First round | Tullaroan | 6-11 - 6-05 | Graigue | Nowlan Park |

| 28 May 1961 First round | St Lachtain's | 6-06 - 5-06 | St Senan's | Nowlan Park |

| 4 June 1961 First round | Far South | 8-09 - 3-01 | John Locke's | Thomastown Grounds |

| 11 June 1961 First round | Lisdowney | 7-07 - 6-06 | James Stepehsn | Nowlan Park |

| 25 June 1961 First round | Glenmore | 3-07 - 4-04 | Slieverue | Thomastown Grounds |

| 9 July 1961 First round replay | Glenmore | 5-09 - 4-06 | Slieverue | Thomastown Grounds |

=== Second round ===
| 2 July 1961 Second round | Erin's Own | 1-06 - 1-05 | Bennetstbridge | Nowlan Park |

| 2 July 1961 Second round | St Lachtain's | 6-08 - 1-04 | Tullaroan | Nowlan Park |

| 23 July 1961 Second round | Far South | 0-10 - 0-05 | Lisdowney | Nowlan Park |

| 6 August 1961 Second round | Near South | 4-09 - 5-02 | Glenmore | Nowlan Park |

=== Semi-finals ===
| 6 August 1961 Semi-final | St Lachtain's | 3-10 - 2-13 | Far South | Nowlan Park |

| 27 August 1961 Semi-final | Near South | 8-05 - 2-09 | Erin's Own | Nowlan Park |

| 27 August 1961 Semi-final replay | St Lachtain's | 2-09 - 3-05 | Far South | Nowlan Park |

=== Final ===
| 17 September 1961 Final | St. Lachtain's | 4-05 - 0-12 | Near South | Nowlan Park |
