= 1963 Railway Cup Hurling Championship =

Irish hurling competition

- Dates: 24 February 1963 – 14 April 1963
- Teams: 4
- Champions: Munster (27th title); Jimmy Doyle (captain)
- Runners-up: Leinster; Billy Rackard (captain)

Tournament statistics
- Matches played: 4
- Goals scored: 34 (8.5 per match)
- Points scored: 54 (13.5 per match)
- Top scorer(s): Jimmy Doyle (4-09)

The 1963 Railway Cup Hurling Championship was the 37th staging of the Railway Cup since its establishment by the Gaelic Athletic Association in 1927. The cup began on 24 February 1963 and ended on 14 April 1963.

Leinster were the defending champions.

On 14 April 1963, Munster won the championship following a 2–08 to 2–07 defeat of Leinster in the final. This was their 27th Railway Cup title and their first since 1961.

Munster's Jimmy Doyle was the Railway Cup top scorer with 4-09.

== Results ==
Semi-finals

| 24 February 1963 Semi-final | Munster | 9-07 - 3-05 | Ulster | Croke Park, Dublin |
| | J Smyth 4-1, Jimmy Doyle 2-2, C Ring 2-0, D Nealon 1-1, T English 0-3. | | S Phelan 1-2, P O'Callaghan 1-1, T Connolly 1-0, D Gallagher 0-1, E Gallagher 0-1. | Attendance: 8,036 |

| 24 February 1963 Semi-final | Leinster | 5-14 - 3-03 | Connacht | Croke Park, Dublin |
| | N Wheeler 2-0, C O'Brien 2-0, E Keher 0-6, D Heaslip 1-2, D Foley 0-3, F Whelan 0-3. | | T Sweeney 1-1, M Curtin 1-0, M Cullinane 1-0, J Salmon 0-1. | Attendance: 8,036; Referee: G Fitzgerald (Limerick) |

Finals

| 17 March 1963 Final | Leinster | 5-05 - 5-05 | Munster | Croke Park, Dublin |
| | D Heaslip 3-0, N Wheeler 1-0, C O'Brien 1-0, F Whelan 0-3, M Kennedy 0-1, E Keher 0-1. | | Jimmy Doyle 2-3, D Nealon 1-1, C Ring 1-1, L Devaney 1-0. | Attendance: 30,680; Referee: S Gleeson (Limerick) |

| 14 April 1963 Final | Leinster | 2-07 - 2-08 | Munster | Croke Park, Dublin |
| | N Wheeler 1-1, D Heaslip 1-0, O McGrath 0-2, D Foley 0-2, S Cleere 0-1, C O'Brien 0-1. | | J Smyth 1-1, Jimmy Doyle 0-4, D Nealon 1-0, T Cheasty 0-1, L Devaney 0-1, J Condon 0-1. |

== Cup statistics ==
=== Scoring ===
Top scorers overall

| Rank | Player | Club | Tally | Total | Matches | Average |
|---|---|---|---|---|---|---|
| 1 | Jimmy Doyle | Munster | 4-09 | 21 | 3 | 7.00 |
| 2 | Denis Heaslip | Leinster | 5-02 | 17 | 3 | 5.66 |
| 2 | Jimmy Smyth | Munster | 5-02 | 17 | 3 | 5.66 |
| 3 | Ned Wheeler | Leinster | 4-01 | 13 | 3 | 4.33 |
| 4 | Donie Nealon | Munster | 3-02 | 11 | 3 | 3.66 |

Top scorers in a single game

| Rank | Player | Club | Tally | Total | Opposition |
|---|---|---|---|---|---|
| 1 | Jimmy Smyth | Munster | 4-01 | 13 | Ulster |
| 2 | Denis Heaslip | Leinster | 3-00 | 9 | Connacht |
| 2 | Jimmy Doyle | Munster | 2-03 | 9 | Leinster |
| 3 | Jimmy Doyle | Munster | 2-02 | 8 | Ulster |
| 4 | Christy Ring | Munster | 2-00 | 6 | Ulster |
| 4 | Ned Wheeler | Leinster | 2-00 | 6 | Connacht |
| 4 | Christy O'Brien | Leinster | 2-00 | 6 | Connacht |
| 4 | Eddie Keher | Leinster | 0-06 | 6 | Connacht |
| 5 | Denis Heaslip | Leinster | 1-02 | 5 | Munster |
| 5 | S. Phelan | Ulster | 1-02 | 5 | Munster |

=== Miscellaneous ===
- Christy Ring claimed his 18th winners' medal after making his 23rd consecutive appearance in the Railway Cup Championship.

== Bibliography ==
- Donegan, Des, The Complete Handbook of Gaelic Games (DBA Publications Limited, 2005).
