= Pat Lennon (hurler) =

Irish hurler

Personal information
- Native name: Pádraig Ó Leannáin (Irish)
- Born: 1932 (age 93–94) Callan, County Kilkenny, Ireland

Sport
- Sport: Hurling
- Position: Right wing-back
Clubs
- Years: Club
- Graigue; John Locke's
Club titles
- Kilkenny titles: 1
Inter-county*
Years	County	Apps (scores)
1954	Kilkenny	1 (0-00)
Inter-county titles
- Leinster titles: 0
- All-Irelands: 0
- NHL: 0
- *Inter County team apps and scores correct as of 17:50, 13 September 2014.

Pat Lennon (born 1932) is an Irish hurler who played as a right wing-back for the Kilkenny senior team.

Born in Callan, County Kilkenny, Lennon first arrived on the inter-county scene at the age of seventeen when he first linked up with the Kilkenny minor team. He made his senior debut during the 1954 championship. Lennon went on to play a brief role for Kilkenny.

At club level Lennon is a one-time championship medallist with John Locke's. He began his club career with Graigue.

Throughout his career Lennon made just one championship appearance for Kilkenny.

== Honours ==
=== Team ===
Graigue

- Kilkenny Minor Hurling Championship (1): 1949

John Locke's

- Kilkenny Senior Hurling Championship (1): 1957

Kilkenny

- All-Ireland Minor Hurling Championship (1): 1950
- Leinster Minor Hurling Championship (1): 1950

Achievements
Preceded by John O'Grady (Tipperary)	All-Ireland Minor Hurling Final winning captain 1950	Succeeded by Johnny Clifford (Cork)
