= 1900 All-Ireland Senior Hurling Championship =

Championship details
- Dates: 12 May 1901 – 26 October 1902

All-Ireland champions
- Winning team: Tipperary (6th win)
- Captain: Ned Hayes

All-Ireland Finalists
- Losing team: London
- Captain: Dan Horgan

Provincial champions
- Munster: Tipperary
- Leinster: Kilkenny
- Ulster: Antrim
- Connacht: Galway

Championship statistics
- All-Star Team: See here

The 1900 All-Ireland Senior Hurling Championship was the 14th staging of the All-Ireland hurling championship since its establishment by the Gaelic Athletic Association in 1887. The championship began on 12 May 1901 and ended on 26 October 1902.

Tipperary were the defending champions, and retained their title following a 2–5 to 0–6 defeat of London in the final.

== Format ==
All-Ireland Championship

Semi-final: (2 matches) The four provincial representatives make up the semi-final pairings. Two teams are eliminated at this stage while the two winning teams advance to the home final.

Home final: (1 match) The winners of the two semi-finals contest this game. One team is eliminated while the winning team advances to the final.

Final: (1 match) The winners of the home final and London, who receive a bye to this stage of the championship, contest this game. The winners are declared All-Ireland champions.

== Provincial championships ==
=== Connacht Senior Hurling Championship ===
Final

Final

Galway	4–2 – 1–2	Sligo

=== Leinster Senior Hurling Championship ===
Semi-final

9 March 1902 Semi-final	Offaly	1–05 – 3–03	Kilkenny	Abbeyleix Sportsfield

Final

25 August 1901 Final	Kilkenny	4–11 – 4–10	Dublin	Wexford Sportsfield

=== Munster Senior Hurling Championship ===
Quarter-finals

20 October 1901 Quarter-final	Limerick	1–07 – 3-07	Clare	Markets Field

3 November 1901 Quarter-final	Tipperary	0–12 – 0-09	Cork	Fraher Field

Semi-finals

10 November 1901 Semi-final	Kerry	w/o – scr.	Waterford	Turner's Cross

23 March 1902 Semi-final	Tipperary	6–11 – 1-06	Clare	Markets Field

Final

11 May 1902 Final	Tipperary	6–11 – 2-01	Kerry	Markets Field

== All-Ireland Senior Hurling Championship ==
=== All-Ireland semi-finals ===
29 June 1902 Semi-final	Tipperary	1–11 – 1-08	Kilkenny	Carrick-on-Suir

20 July 1902 Semi-final	Galway	about 3–44 – 0-01	Antrim	Terenure

Note: The Galway–Antrim game was so one-sided that reporters present did not record the exact score. It was 3–17 to 0–1 at half-time, and Antrim did not score in the second half.

=== All-Ireland home final ===
21 September 1902 Home final	Tipperary	6–13 – 1-05	Galway	Terenure

=== All-Ireland final ===
26 October 1902 Final	Tipperary	2–05 – 0-06	London	Jones’s Road
				Attendance: c. 8,000; Referee: J McCarthy (Kilkenny)

== Championship statistics ==
=== Miscellaneous ===
- A team from Ulster participates in the championship for the first time with Antrim representing the northern province.
- The Connacht championship is contested for the first time.
- One of the All-Ireland semi-finals sees the Leinster and Munster champions play against each other. This did not happen again until the 1928 championship.
- As a gesture to the exiles, London were allowed to participate in the championship for the first time and are given a bye to the final.
- Tipperary become the second team to win three successive All-Ireland titles.

== See also ==
- 1901 All-Ireland Senior Football Championship

== Sources ==
- Corry, Eoghan, The GAA Book of Lists (Hodder Headline Ireland, 2005).
- Donegan, Des, The Complete Handbook of Gaelic Games (DBA Publications Limited, 2005).
