= Donal Whelan =

Irish hurler

Personal information
- Native name: Dónall Ó Faoileáin (Irish)
- Nickname: Duck
- Born: 1931 County Waterford, Ireland
- Occupation: Technical School Headmaster
- Height: 5 ft 8 in (173 cm)

Sport
- Sport: Hurling
- Position: Left corner-back
Club
- Years: Club
- Abbeyside
Club titles
- Waterford titles: 0
Inter-county
- Years: County
- Waterford
Inter-county titles
- Munster titles: 2
- All-Irelands: 1
- NHL: 0

Donal Anthony Whelan is an Irish retired hurler who played as a left corner-back for the Waterford senior team.

Whelan was a key member of the team during a golden age for Waterford hurling in the late 1950s. During his inter-county career he won one All-Ireland medal and two Munster medals. Whelan was an All-Ireland runner-up on one occasion.

At club level Whelan enjoyed a lengthy career with Abbeyside.
