= Jack Coughlan =

Irish hurler

John J. (Jack) Coughlan was an Irish sportsperson. He played hurling with his local club Tulla and with the Clare and the London inter-county teams in the early 1900s.

Jack Coughlan was born in Tulla, County Clare, Ireland, an area in the county that was famous for hurling even before the foundation of the Gaelic Athletic Association. Coughlan made his name as a hurler with Tulla, and was prominent in the club's county title in 1896. He subsequently won a Croke Cup title with Clare later that year. Shortly after these victories Coughlan later left Tulla and emigrated to London. It was here that he played hurling with the great London team of the time. He played in the 1900 All-Ireland final but lost out to Tipperary on that occasion. In 1901 Coughlan was the captain of the London team that defeated Cork in the championship decider, giving Coughlan an All-Ireland title.

Preceded by Dan Horgan	London Senior Hurling Captain; 1901	Succeeded by J. Nestor
Preceded by Ned Hayes (Tipperary)	All-Ireland Senior Hurling winning captain 1901	Succeeded by Jamesy Kelleher (Cork)
