= 1960 All-Ireland Senior Hurling Championship =

Championship details
- Dates: 10 April - 4 September 1960
- Teams: 13

All-Ireland champions
- Winning team: Wexford (4th win)
- Captain: Nick O'Donnell

All-Ireland Finalists
- Losing team: Tipperary
- Captain: Tony Wall

Provincial champions
- Munster: Tipperary
- Leinster: Wexford
- Ulster: Not Played
- Connacht: Not Played

Championship statistics
- No. matches played: 13
- Goals total: 88 (6.7 per game)
- Points total: 199 (15.3 per game)
- Top Scorer: Jimmy Doyle (5–18)
- Player of the Year: Nick O'Donnell
- All-Star Team: See here

The 1960 All-Ireland Senior Hurling Championship was the 74th staging of the All-Ireland hurling championship since its establishment by the Gaelic Athletic Association in 1887. The championship began on 10 April 1960 and ended on 4 September 1960.

Waterford were the defending champions, however, they were defeated in the provincial championship. Wexford won the title after defeating Tipperary by 2–15 to 0–11 in the All-Ireland final.

== Teams ==
A total of thirteen teams contested the championship.

=== Team summaries ===
Team	Colours	Most recent success		
Team	Colours	All-Ireland	Provincial	League
Clare	Saffron and blue	1914	1932	1945–46
Cork	Red and white	1954	1956	1952–53
Dublin	Blue and navy	1938	1952	1938–39
Galway	Maroon and white	1923		1950–51
Kilkenny	Black and amber	1957	1959	1932–33
Laois	Blue and white	1915	1949	
Limerick	Green and white	1940	1955	1946–47
Meath	Green and gold			
Offaly	Green, white and gold			
Tipperary	Blue and gold	1958	1958	1959–60
Waterford	White and blue	1959	1959	
Westmeath	Maroon and white			
Wexford	Purple and gold	1956	1956	1957–58

== Results ==
=== Leinster Senior Hurling Championship ===
First round

10 April 1960 First round	Offaly	3–01 – 5–06	Westmeath	St. Brendan's Park
	N McGee 1–1, T Cleary 1–0, B Loughnane 1–0.		J Rooney 3–0, J McGrath 1–2, E Bruer 1–2, S Bolger 0–1, M Bolger 0–1.	Referee: E Kelly

10 April 1960 First round	Laois	3–09 – 2–05	Meath	St. Conleth's Park
	R Dunne 2–1, J Lyons 0–7, D Donovan 1–1.		S Kelly 1–3, M Lenehan 1–1, S Garrigan 0–1.	Referee: E Barron

Quarter-final

22 May 1960 Quarter-final	Westmeath	4–06 – 3–05	Laois	O'Connor Park
	J McGrath 1–1, P McCabe 1–0, E Bruer 1–0, J Graham 1–0, S Stokes 0–3, S Kirby 0–1, S Bolger 0–1.		D Donovan 2–0, M O'Donnell 1–0, D Dunne 0–4, J Lyons 0–1.	Attendance: 4,111; Referee: J Langton (Kilkenny)

Semi-finals

12 June 1960 Semi-final	Kilkenny	6–02 – 0–03	Westmeath	O'Moore Park
	D Heaslip 2–0, P Walsh 2–0, N Teehan 1–1, S Clohessy 1–0, E Keher 0–1.		S Kirby 0–1, P McCabe 0–1, T Holohan 0–1.	Attendance: 6,000; Referee: J Dowling (Offaly)

19 June 1960 Semi-final	Wexford	3–05 – 2–08	Dublin	Nowlan Park
	O McGrath 1–0, S Power 1–0, S Quaid 1–0, P Kehoe 0–2, J O'Brien 0–2, N Wheeler 0–1.		L Foley 1–0, K McLoughlin 1–0, L Shannon 0–3, D Foley 0–3, M Bohane 0–1, R Doyle 0–1.	Attendance: 14,500; Referee: J Spain (Offaly)

10 July 1960 Semi-final replay	Wexford	4–06 – 2–07	Dublin	Nowlan Park
	J O'Brien 2–0, O McGrath 1–1, P Kehoe 0–3, J Morrissey 0–1, S Quaid 0–1.		L Foley 1–0, M Bohane 1–0, L Shannon 0–3, F Whelan 0–2, D Foley 0–2.	Attendance: 12,000; Referee: J Spain (Offaly)

Final

24 July 1960 Final	Wexford	3–10 – 2–11	Kilkenny	Croke Park
	P Kehoe 1–5, O McGrath 1–1, J O'Brien 1–0, S Quaid 0–2, J English 0–1, J Morrissey 0–1.		E Keher 1–8, T O'Connell 1–0, R Carroll 0–3.	Attendance: 42,332; Referee: J Dowling (Offaly)

=== Munster Senior Hurling Championship ===
Quarter-finals

26 June 1960 Quarter-final	Waterford	9–08 – 4–08	Galway	Gaelic Grounds
	D Whelan 4–0, L Guinan 3–0, F Walsh 2–0, P Grimes 0–3, M Flannelly 0–2, T Cunningham 0–2, T Cheasty 0–1.		T Sweeeny 0–5, PJ Larkin 1–0, PJ Lally 1–0, PJ Lawless 1–0, J Sweeney 1–0, M Cullinane 0–1, J Conroy 0–1, N Murray 0–1.	Attendance: 7,000; Referee: G Fitzgerald (Limerick)

3 July 1960 Quarter-final	Tipperary	10–09 – 2–01	Limerick	Cork Athletic Grounds
	D Nealon 3–4, Jimmy Doyle 3–3, W Moloughney 2–0, L Devaney 1–1, T Moloughney 1–0, L Connolly 0–1.		D Kelly 1–0, L Hogan 1–0, T Ryan 0–1.	Attendance: 15,000; Referee: C Conway (Cork)

Semi-finals

12 June 1960 Semi-final	Cork	2–12 – 1–11	Clare	Thurles Sportsfield
	C Ring 1–4, M Quane 1–2, E Goulding 0–2, J Young 0–2, P Barry 0–1, J Sullivan 0–1.		J Smyth 0–5, N Jordan 0–4, J Barrett 1–0, C Madigan 0–1, M Lynch 0–1.	Attendance: 7,000; Referee: G Fitzgerald (Limerick)

17 July 1960 Semi-final	Tipperary	6–9 – 2–7	Waterford	Gaelic Grounds
	Jimmy Doyle 1–6, D Nealon 2–0, T Moloughney 2–0, S McLoughlin 1–0, T Wall 0–1, L Devaney 0–1, L Connolly 0–1.		F Walsh 1–5, T Cunningham 1–0, P Grimes 0–1, S Power 0–1.	Attendance: 35,190; Referee: G Fitzgerald (Limerick)

Final

31 July 1960 Final	Tipperary	4–13 – 4–11	Cork	Thurles Sportsfield
	Jimmy Doyle 1–8, S McLoughlin 2–1, L Connolly 1–0, L Devaney 0–1, D Nealon 0–1, T Wall 0–1, A Moloughney 0–1.		P Barry 2–0, C Ring 0–6, M Quane 1–2, L Dowling 1–0, T Kelly 0–1, J Twomey 0–1, P Duggan 0–1.	Attendance: 49,670; Referee: G Fitzgerald (Limerick)

=== All-Ireland Senior Hurling Championship ===
Final

4 September 1960 Final	Wexford	2–15 – 0–11	Tipperary	Croke Park
	P Kehoe 1–7, O McGrath 1–2, T Flood 0–3, J Morrissey 0–1, J Harding 0–1, J O'Brien 0–1.		T Ryan 0–3, L Devaney 0–2, T Moloughney 0–2, T Wall 0–2, T English 0–1, Jimmy Doyle 0–1.	Attendance: 67,150; Referee: J Dowling (Offaly)

== Championship statistics ==
=== Top scorers ===
Overall

Rank	Player	Club	Tally	Total	Matches	Average
1	Jimmy Doyle	Tipperary	5–18	33	4	8.25
2	Padge Kehoe	Wexford	2–17	23	4	5.75
3	Donie Nealon	Tipperary	5-05	20	4	5.00
4	Oliver McGrath	Wexford	4-04	16	4	4.00
5	Frankie Walsh	Waterford	3-05	14	2	7.00
6	Tom Moloughney	Tipperary	4-01	13	4	3.25
6	Christy Ring	Cork	1–10	13	2	6.50
7	Donal Whelan	Waterford	4-00	12	2	6.00
7	Jimmy O'Brien	Wexford	3-03	12	4	3.00
7	Tom Moloughney	Tipperary	3-03	12	4	3.00
7	Eddie Keher	Kilkenny	1-09	12	2	6.00

In a single game

Rank	Player	Club	Tally	Total	Opposition
1	Donie Nealon	Tipperary	3-04	13	Limerick
2	Donal Whelan	Waterford	4-00	13	Galway
2	Jimmy Doyle	Tipperary	3-03	13	Limerick
3	Jimmy Doyle	Tipperary	1-08	11	Cork
3	Eddie Keher	Kilkenny	1-08	11	Wexford
4	Padge Kehoe	Wexford	1-07	10	Tipperary
5	Jimmy Rooney	Westmeath	3-00	9	Offaly
5	Larry Guinan	Waterford	3-00	9	Galway
5	Jimmy Doyle	Tipperary	1-06	9	Waterford
6	Padge Kehoe	Wexford	1-05	8	Kilkenny
6	Frankie Walsh	Waterford	1-05	8	Tipperary

=== Scoring ===
- Widest winning margin: 32 points
  - Tipperary 10–9 – 2–1 Limerick (Munster quarter-final, 3 July 1960)
- Most goals in a match: 13
  - Waterford 9–8 – 4–8 Galway (Munster quarter-final, 26 June 1960)
- Most points in a match: 26
  - Wexford 2–15 – 0–11 Tipperary (All-Ireland final, 4 September 1960)
- Most goals by one team in a match: 10
  - Tipperary 10–9 – 2–1 Limerick (Munster quarter-final, 3 July 1960)
- Most goals scored by a losing team: 4
  - Galway 4–8 – 9–8 Waterford (Munster quarter-final, 26 June 1960)
  - Cork 4–11 – 4–13 Tipperary (Munster final, 31 July 1960)

=== Miscellaneous ===
- Wexford's defeat of Tipperary in the All-Ireland final is their first championship victory over Tipperary.

== Sources ==
- Corry, Eoghan, The GAA Book of Lists (Hodder Headline Ireland, 2005).
- Donegan, Des, The Complete Handbook of Gaelic Games (DBA Publications Limited, 2005).
- Sweeney, Éamonn, Munster Hurling Legends (The O'Brien Press, 2002).
