= Séamus Cullinane =

Irish hurler

Séamus Cllinane
Personal information
- Native name: Séamus Ó Cuileannáin (Irish)
- Born: 1933 Cahernashelleeney, County Galway, Ireland
- Died: August 2002 (aged 68–69) Athenry, County Galway, Ireland
- Occupation: Secondary school principal

Sport
- Sport: Hurling
- Position: Left wing-back
Club
- Years: Club
- Castlegar
Club titles
- Galway titles: 4
Inter-county*
Years	County	Apps (scores)
1954-1958	Galway	2 (0-00)
Inter-county titles
- All-Irelands: 0
- NHL: 0
- *Inter County team apps and scores correct as of 21:55, 10 February 2014.

Séamus Cullinane (1933 – August 2002) was an Irish hurler who played as a left wing-back for the Galway senior team.

Born in Cahernashelleeney, Claregalway, County Galway, Cullinane first played competitive hurling whilst at school at St. Mary's College. He arrived on the inter-county scene when he first linked up with the Galway minor team. He made his senior debut in the 1954 championship. Cullinane went on to play a bit part for Galway over the next few years, however, he enjoyed little success in terms of silverware. He was an All-Ireland runner-up on one occasion.

As a member of the Connacht inter-provincial team at various times, Cullinane enjoyed little success in the Railway Cup. At club level he was a four-time championship medallist with Castlegar.

Throughout his career Cullinane made just two championship appearances for Galway. His retirement came following the conclusion of the 1958 championship.

In retirement from playing, Cullinane became involved in team management and coaching. At club level he was a selector when Athenry reached their first championship decider in 1977.

== Honours ==
=== Player ===
Castlegar

- Galway Senior Club Hurling Championship (4): 1952, 1953, 1957, 1958

Sporting positions
Preceded by Mick Burke	Galway Senior Hurling Captain; 1954	Succeeded by Jimmy Duggan
Preceded by	Galway Senior Hurling Captain; 1958	Succeeded by
