= Denis Heaslip =

Irish hurler (1933–2020)

Personal information
- Native name: Donncha Ó hEislip (Irish)
- Born: May 1933 Knocktopher, County Kilkenny, Ireland
- Died: 25 November 2020 (aged 87) Kilkenny, Ireland
- Occupation: County council employee
- Height: 5 ft 9 in (175 cm)

Sport
- Sport: Hurling
- Position: Right wing-forward
Club
- Years: Club
- Knocktopher
Club titles
- Kilkenny titles: 0
Inter-county
Years	County	Apps (scores)
1956–1964	Kilkenny	18 (11–12)
Inter-county titles
- Leinster titles: 5
- All-Irelands: 2
- NHL: 1

Denis Heaslip (May 1933 – 25 November 2020) was an Irish hurler who played as a right wing-forward for the Kilkenny senior team.

Born in Knocktopher, County Kilkenny, Heaslip first arrived on the inter-county scene when he first linked up with the Kilkenny senior team, making his debut in the 1957 championship. During his career Heaslip won two All-Ireland medals, three Leinster medals and one National Hurling League medal. He was an All-Ireland runner-up on two occasions.

Heaslip also represented the Leinster inter-provincial team on a number of occasions, winning one Railway Cup medal. At club level he played with Knocktopher.

His retirement came following Kilkenny's defeat by Tipperary in the 1964 All-Ireland final.

The 1957 Championship featured in the 1958 film Rooney where the main character in the film wore a Kilkenny Jersey in the line up. During the film it depicts a goal that was "scored" by the main character (Rooney). This was in fact Denis Heaslip's goal.

== Playing career ==
=== Kilkenny ===
Having never played at minor level, Heaslip first appeared on the inter-county scene as a member of the Kilkenny junior team during the 1956 Leinster Junior Championship. He ended the provincial campaign with a winners' medal after being one of Kilkenny's top scorers in the 6–11 to 1–08 over Laois in the final. Heaslip scored a hat-trick of goals in the home final defeat of Kerry, before claiming an All-Ireland Junior Championship medal after the 5–02 to 2–08 win over London.

Heaslip's performances for the Kilkenny junior team drew the attention of the senior selectors and he was one of a number of players promoted to the Kilkenny senior team prior to the start of the 1956-57 league. He lined out in all but one of Kilkenny's five league games, including the six-point league final defeat by Tipperary. Heaslip was retained on the Kilkenny panel for the 1957 Leinster Championship and made his debut on 30 June in a 1–11 to 2-08 semi-final draw with Dublin. He ended the campaign with a winners' medal after scoring a goal in the 6–09 to 1–05 defeat of Wexford in the final. On 1 September 1957, Heaslip was again included on the starting fifteen when Kilkenny faced Waterford in the All-Ireland final. He ended the game with his first winners' medal after scoring a point in the 4–10 to 3–12 victory.

Heaslip scored 3-01 from play in Kilkenny's semi-final replay defeat of Dublin in the 1958 Leinster Championship. Injury ruled him out of the Leinster final, however, he claimed a second successive winners' medal as a substitute after the 5–12 to 4–09 win over Wexford.

After returning to the starting fifteen for the 1959 Leinster Championship, Heaslip claimed a third successive provincial winners' medal, his second on the field of play, after the 2–09 to 1–11 victory over Dublin. On 6 September 1959, he played in his second All-Ireland final when Kilkenny drew 1–17 to 5–05 with Waterford. The replay a month later resulted in Heaslip ending on the losing side after the 3–12 to 1–10 defeat.

After failing to make it four successive provincial titles in-a-row after losing out to Wexford in the 1960 Leinster final, Kilkenny failed to even qualify for the following year's final. On 6 May 1962, Heaslip claimed his second national title when Kilkenny defeated Cork by 1–16 to 1–08 to claim the National League title for the first time in 30 years. He was subsequently denied a fourth Leinster Championship medal as Kilkenny suffered a 3–09 to 2–10 defeat by Wexford in the 1962 Leinster final.

Injury ruled Heaslip out of the 1963 Leinster Championship, however, he claimed a fourth provincial winners' medal from the substitutes' bench after the 2–10 to 0–09 defeat of Dublin in the final. On 1 September 1963, he was restored to the starting fifteen at right wing-forward when Kilkenny faced Waterford in the All-Ireland final for the fourth time in seven seasons. Held scoreless over the hour, Heaslip ended the match with a second All-Ireland winners' medal after the 4–17 to 6–08 win.

After collecting a fifth provincial title after coming on as a substitute in the 4–11 to 1–08 defeat of Dublin in the 1964 Leinster final, Heaslip was again listed amongst the substitutes for the subsequent All-Ireland final against Tipperary. In spite of being regarded as the favourites, Kilkenny ended the game as runners-up after a 5–13 to 2–08 defeat by Tipperary. Heaslip retired from inter-county hurling at the end of the 1964 season.

== Career statistics ==
Team	Season	National League			Leinster		All-Ireland		Total	
Team	Season	Division	Apps	Score	Apps	Score	Apps	Score	Apps	Score
Kilkenny	1956-57	Division 1A	4	2-06	2	2-01	1	0-01	7	4-08
Kilkenny	1957-58	Division 1A	5	1-08	2	3-01	1	0-01	8	4-10
Kilkenny	1958-59	Division 1A	4	3-06	1	0-01	2	1-01	7	4-08
Kilkenny	1959-60	Division 1A	4	1-03	2	2-00	—		6	3-03
Kilkenny	1960-61	Division 1A	2	1-00	1	0-00	—		3	1-00
Kilkenny	1961-62	Division 1B	5	11-08	2	2-02	—		7	13-10
Kilkenny	1962-63	Division 1B	4	2-03	0	0-00	1	0-00	5	2-03
Kilkenny	1963-64	Division 1A	3	0-04	2	1-03	1	0-00	6	1-07
Career total			31	21-38	12	10-08	6	1-03	49	32-49

== Honours ==
Kilkenny

- All-Ireland Senior Hurling Championship (2): 1957, 1963
- Leinster Senior Hurling Championship (5): 1957, 1958, 1959, 1963, 1964
- National Hurling League (1): 1961-62
- All-Ireland Junior Hurling Championship (1): 1956
- Leinster Junior Hurling Championship (1): 1956

Leinster

- Railway Cup (1): 1962
