= 1961–62 National Hurling League =

31st season of the National Hurling League

League details
- Dates: 15 October 1961 – 6 May 1962
- Teams: 20

League champions

Other division winners
- Division 2: Kerry

The 1961–62 National Hurling League was the 31st season of the National Hurling League.

== Division 1 ==
National Hurling League Division 1
- Season: 1961-62
- Champions: Kilkenny; 2nd National League title Captain: Alfie Hickey
- Matches played: 28
- Top goalscorer: Christy Ring (13-18)
- All statistics correct as of 26 February 2017.

The league saw a major restructuring for the 1961–62 season. Division 1 was split into Group 1A and Group 1B consisting of five teams each and Group 1C consisting of four teams. The top team in each group qualified for the knock-out stage.

Tipperary came into the season as defending champions of the 1960-61 season. Offaly and Westmeath entered Division 1 as part of the restructuring.

On 6 May 1962, Kilkenny won the title after a 1–16 to 1–8 win over Cork in the final. It was their first league title since 1932-33 and their second league title overall.

=== Division 1A table ===
Pos	Team	Pld	W	D	L	Pts	Notes
1	Cork	4	4	0	0	8	National League runners-up
2	Waterford	4	3	0	1	6	
3	Limerick	3	1	0	2	2	
4	Wexford	4	1	0	3	2	
5	Carlow	3	0	0	3	0	

=== Group stage ===
15 October 1961	Cork	8-10 - 4-09	Carlow	Cork Athletic Grounds, Cork
	C Ring 4-3, T Kelly 2-2, M Quane 2-0, J Bennett 0-3, P Harte 0-2.		W Walsh 2-3, M Morrissey 1-3, G Doyle 1-0, J McCarthy 0-2, M O'Brien 0-1.	Referee: M Pollard (Westmeath)

15 October 1961	Wexford	1-10 - 4-04	Limerick	Enniscorthy
	H Doyle 1-1, P Lynch 0-3, P Kehoe 0-2, M Bergin 0-1, B Rackard 0-1, J Walsh 0-1, J O'Brien 0-1.		J Quaid 2-1, E O'Neill 2-1, L Hogan 0-1, PJ Keane 0-1.	Referee: J Hatton (Wicklow)

29 October 1961	Limerick	3-09 - 4-07	Cork	Gaelic Grounds, Limerick
	J Quaid 2-0, G Fitzgerald 1-0, E Carey 0-2, E O'Neill 0-2, L Hogan 0-2, M Rainsford 0-1, PJ Keane 0-1, P Murphy 0-1.		M Quane 2-1, C Ring 1-3, R Browne 1-0, J Bennett 0-1, D Murphy 0-1, T Kelly 0-1.	Referee: S Spain (Offaly)

12 November 1961	Waterford	4-12 - 1-02	Limerick	Walsh Park, Waterford
	S Power 2-3, T Walsh 1-3, P Grimes 1-2, J Condon 0-1, M Murphy 0-1, M Morrissey 0-1, T Cheasty 0-1.		P Hartnett 1-0, L Hogan 0-2.	Referee: J Maddocks (Wexford)

19 November 1961	Carlow	4-04 - 4-07	Waterford	Dr. Cullen Park, Carlow
	W Hogan 1-2, J McCarthy 1-0, P Bophy 1-0, M Morrissey 1-0, M O'Brien 0-1, N Gorman 0-1.		T Walsh 1-1, M Guiry 1-0, M Murphy 1-0, J Condon 1-0, P Grimes 0-2, J Meaney 0-2, M Óg Morrissey 0-1.

11 February 1962	Cork	9-07 - 3-06	Wexford	Cork Athletic Grounds, Cork
	C Ring 3-3, J Bennett 2-1, R Browne 2-1, M Quane 1-0, P Fitzgerald 1-0, L O'Driscoll 0-1, P Harte 0-1.		P Lynch 1-0, O McGrath 1-0, J Kennedy 1-0, P Kehoe 0-2, M Lyng 0-2, P Ryan 0-1, J O'Brien 0-1.

11 March 1962	Wexford	1-05 - 5-06	Waterford	Gorey
	P Lynch 1-3, O McGrath 0-2.		S Power 2-1, F Walsh 1-2, M Murphy 1-0, T Walsh 1-0, J Meaney 0-2, P Grimes 0-1.	Referee: J Hatton (Wicklow)

1 April 1962	Waterford	1-09 - 3-04	Cork	Fraher Field, Dungarvan
	P Grimes 0-4, J Barron 1-0, S Power 0-1, M Dempsey 0-1, M Óg Morrissey 0-1, J Meaney 0-1, F Walsh 0-1.		C Ring 2-2, R Browne 1-0, P Harte 0-1, J Quigley 0-1.

1 April 1962	Carlow	1-03 - 6-09	Wexford	Dr. Cullen Park, Carlow
	L Walsh 1-2, P Walsh 0-1.		O McGrath 4-2, N Wheeler 2-2, J Hennessy 0-2, P Lynch 0-1, M Bergin 0-1, E Kelly 0-1.

=== Division 1B table ===
Pos	Team	Pld	W	D	L	Pts	Notes
1	Kilkenny	4	4	0	0	8	National League champions
2	Tipperary	4	3	0	1	6	
3	Clare	4	2	0	2	4	
4	Offaly	4	1	0	3	2	
5	Laois	4	0	0	4	0	

=== Group stage ===
15 October 1961	Clare	5-06 - 4-17	Kilkenny	Cusack Park, Ennis
	S Cullinan 3-0, P Henchy 1-3, P Ryan 1-0, N Jordan 0-2, J Dore 0-1.		E Keher 1-9, S Clohessy 2-1, D Heaslip 1-2, A Comerford 0-2, D Butler 0-2, S Cleere 0-1.

29 October 1961	Kilkenny	6-13 - 2-05	Laois	Nowlan Park, Kilkenny
	D Heaslip 3-5, A Comerford 1-3, W Murphy 1-3, M Doherty 1-1, E Murphy 0-1.		T Walsh 0-4, D Donovan 1-0, J Kelly 1-0, S Cashin 0-1.	Referee: J Maddock (Wexford)

29 October 1961	Offaly	2-04 - 4-08	Clare	St. Brendan's Park, Birr

12 November 1961	Clare	0-02 - 2-06	Tipperary	Cusack Park, Ennis
	S Cleary 0-1, N Jordan 0-1.		T Ryan 1-1, D Nealon 1-0, B Moloughney 0-3, P Dorney 0-1, J McKenna 0-1.

12 November 1961	Laois	2-05 - 3-06	Offaly	O'Moore Park, Portlaoise
	J Walsh 1-0, J Conroy 1-0, P Fitzpatrick 0-3, J Lyons 0-1, P Dillon 0-1.		B Loughnane 2-0, J Nallen 1-1, W Gorman 0-2, P Molloy 0-2, A Hoctor 0-1.	Referee: T McCormack (Westmeath)

11 February 1962	Tipperary	11-11 - 1-02	Offaly	St. Cronan's Park, Roscrea
	J McKenna 5-1, D Nealon 3-3, J Doyle 2-2, T Ryan (Killenaule) 1-0, M Burns 0-3, T English 0-1, W Moloughney 0-1.		JJ Healion 1-0, M Franks 0-1, W Gorman 0-1.	Referee: E Conroy (Laois)

11 March 1962	Offaly	3-01 - 8-06	Kilkenny	St. Brendan's Park, Birr
	E England 2-0, B Loughnane 1-0, JJ Healion 0-1.		D Heaslip 6-0, E Keher 1-4, N Power 1-0, A Comerford 0-1, W Murphy 0-1.	Referee: E Conroy (Laois)

11 March 1962	Tipperary	5-08 - 0-07	Laois	St. Cronan's Park, Roscrea
	John Doyle 2-1, D Nealon 1-4, M McKenna 1-0, T Ryan (Toomevara) 0-1, T Ryan (Killenaule) 0-1,		Donovan 0-2, Lyons 0-1, T Kelly 0-1, T Drennan 0-1.

1 April 1962	Laois	0-03 - 2-03	Clare	O'Moore Park, Portlaoise
	P Dillon 0-1, P Delaney 0-1, J Lyons 0-1.		P Henchy 1-1, J McCarthy 1-0, N Jordan 0-2.

1 April 1962	Kilkenny	3-05 - 2-05	Tipperary	Nowlan Park, Kilkenny
	W Dywer 2-2, D Heaslip 1-0, E Keher 0-2, N Power 0-1.		T Moloughney 1-0, J Doyle 1-0, T English 0-2, L Devaney 0-1, T Ryan (Toomevara) 0-1, D Nealon 0-1.	Referee: S Spain (Offaly)

=== Division 1C table ===
Pos	Team	Pld	W	D	L	Pts	Notes
1	Dublin	3	2	1	0	5	
2	Galway	3	2	1	0	5	
3	Westmeath	3	1	0	2	2	
4	Antrim	3	0	0	3	0	

=== Group stage ===
15 October 1961	Dublin	5-10 - 4-05	Westmeath	Croke Park, Dublin
	W Jackson 2-3, F Whelan 2-3, A Boothman 1-1, D Foley 0-1, M Kennedy 0-1, E Malone 0-1.		P Fagan 2-1, P McCabe 1-2, J Keary 1-0, S Kirby 0-1, D Nolan 0-1.	Referee: P Everard

15 October 1961	Galway	7-06 - 1-03	Antrim	Duggan Park, Ballinasloe
	P Burns 3-0, PJ Qualter 1-1, J Conroy 1-1, J Donohue 1-1, M Regan 1-0, M Hoare 0-2, P Cahill 0-1.		P Mullaney 1-2, P Richmond 0-1.	Referee: E O'Brien (Westmeath)

29 October 1961	Westmeath	2-10 - 4-05	Galway	Cusack Park, Ennis
	S Kirby 1-1, P Loughlin 0-4, J Rooney 1-0, P McCabe 0-3, D Nolan 0-1, J Carey 0-1.		T Sweeney 1-2, J Gillane 1-1, A Furey 1-0, P Burns 1-0, PJ Lawless 0-1, M Regan 0-1.	Referee: T Mooney (Meath)

29 October 1961	Antrim	1-03 - 2-15	Dublin	Casement Park, Belfast
	O Campbell 1-1, G Mulholland 0-1, P Mullally 0-1.		L Shannon 0-6, F Whelan 1-2, A Boothman 0-5, W Jackson 1-0, B Boothman 0-2.

1 April 1962	Antrim	2-01 - 2-07	Westmeath	Casement Park, Belfast
	O Campbell 1-0, P Mullaney 1-0, D McMullen 0-1.		J Rooney 2-0, M Bolger 0-3, S Kirby 0-2, M Mullen 0-1, P Fagan 0-1.

1 April 1962	Dublin	1-09 - 2-06	Galway	Croke Park, Dublin
	D Foley 0-4, A Boothman 1-0, L Shannon 0-3, M Kennedy 0-2.		T Sweeeny 1-3, S Conway 1-0, S Devlin 0-2, J Gillane 0-1.	Referee: J Hatton (Wicklow)

=== Play-off ===
8 April 1962 Play-off	Dublin	0-11 - 1-07	Galway	Croke Park, Dublin
	F Whelan 0-5, A Boothman 0-2, L Shannon 0-2, P Croke 0-1, S Bohan 0-1.		T Sweeney 1-3, J Gillane 0-1, A Devlin 0-1, S Gohery 0-1, L Donoghue 0-1.

=== Knock-out stage ===
Semi-final

14 April 1962 Semi-final	Cork	6-12 - 1-04	Dublin	Thurles Sportsfield, Thurles
	L Dowling 3-3, C Ring 2-2, M Quane 1-0, P Harte 0-3, M Mortell 0-3, J O'Sullivan 0-1.		F Whelan 1-2, A Boothman 0-1, B Boothman 0-1.

Final

6 May 1962 Final	Kilkenny	1-16 - 1-08	Cork	Croke Park, Dublin
	E Keher 0-9, B Dwyer 1-4, D Carroll 0-1, D Heaslip 0-1, S Clohossy 0-1.		C Ring 1-5, P Harte 0-2, P Fitzgerald 0-1.

=== Top scorer ===
Top scorers overall

Rank	Player	Club	Tally	Total
1	Christy Ring	Cork	13-18	57
2	Denis Heaslip	Kilkenny	11-08	41
3	Eddie Keher	Kilkenny	2-24	30
4	Fran Whelan	Dublin	4-12	24
5	Donie Nealon	Tipperary	5-08	23
6	John McKenna	Tipperary	6-02	20
7	Oliver McGrath	Wexford	5-04	19
7	Mick Quane	Cork	6-01	19
8	Séamus Power	Waterford	4-05	17
8	Tim Sweeney	Galway	3-08	17

Top scorers in a single game

Rank	Player	Club	Tally	Total	Opposition
1	Denis Heaslip	Kilkenny	6-00	18	Offaly
2	John McKenna	Tipperary	5-01	16	Offaly
3	Christy Ring	Cork	4-03	15	Carlow
4	Oliver McGrath	Wexford	4-02	14	Carlow
4	Denis Heaslip	Kilkenny	3-05	14	Laois
5	Christy Ring	Cork	3-03	12	Wexford
5	Liam Dowling	Cork	3-03	12	Dublin
5	Donie Nealon	Tipperary	3-03	12	Offaly
5	Eddie Keher	Kilkenny	1-09	12	Clare

== Division 2 ==
National Hurling League Division 2
- Season: 1961-62
- Champions: Kerry
- All statistics correct as of 26 February 2017.

The league saw a major restructuring for the 1961–62 season. Division 2 was split into Group 2A and Group 2B consisting of three teams each. The top team in each group qualified for the knock-out stage.

On 20 May 1962, Kerry won the title after a 3–8 to 1–2 win over Meath.

=== Division 2A table ===
Pos	Team	Pld	W	D	L	Pts	Notes
1	Meath	2	2	0	0	4	Division 2 runners-up
2	Down	2	1	0	1	2	
3	Wicklow	2	0	0	2	0	

=== Division 2B table ===
Pos	Team	Pld	W	D	L	Pts	Notes
1	Kerry	2	1	1	0	3	Division 2 champions
2	Roscommon	2	1	1	1	3	
3	Kildare	2	0	0	2	0	

=== Play-off ===
Play-off	Kerry	4-8 - 1-1	Roscommon

=== Knock-out stage ===
Final

20 May 1962 Final	Kerry	3-8 - 1-2	Meath	Frank Sheehy Park, Listowel
