= 1960 All-Ireland Senior Hurling Championship final =

1960 All-Ireland Senior Hurling Final
- Event: 1960 All-Ireland Senior Hurling Championship
Wexford	Tipperary
2–15	0–11
- Date: 4 September 1960
- Venue: Croke Park, Dublin
- Referee: John Dowling (Offaly)
- Attendance: 77,154

The 1960 All-Ireland Senior Hurling Championship Final was the 73rd All-Ireland Final and the culmination of the 1960 All-Ireland Senior Hurling Championship, an inter-county hurling tournament for the top teams in Ireland. The match was held at Croke Park, Dublin, on 4 September 1960, between Wexford and Tipperary. The Munster champions lost to their Leinster opponents on a score line of 2–15 to 0–11.

== Match details ==
1960-09-04
15:15 UTC+1

Wexford	2–15 – 0–11	Tipperary

Croke Park, Dublin
Attendance: 77,154
Referee: J. Dowling (Offaly)

Wexford	Tipperary
