= Tim Sweeney (hurler) =

Irish hurler (1929–2018)

Tim Sweeney (10 October 1929 – 1 January 2018) was an Irish sportsman. He played hurling with his local club Fohenagh and was a member of the Galway senior inter-county team between 1949 and 1963.

== County ==
Sweeney played in the All Ireland finals of 1955 where he played corner forward and was marked by Bobby Rackard and 1958. He captained the Tribesmen to their sole victory in the Munster Hurling Championship when they beat Clare in 1961. They won on a scoreline of 2-13 to 0-7 with Sweeney scoring 6 points. He was a member of the Galway team which won the Oireachtas title in 1958.

== Club ==
He won back-to-back county titles with Fohenagh in 1959 and 1960. He was on the Fohenagh team which lost the 1963 county final to Turloughmore.
