= 1899 All-Ireland Senior Hurling Championship final =

1899 All-Ireland Senior Hurling Final
- Event: 1899 All-Ireland Senior Hurling Championship
Tipperary	Wexford
3-12	1-4
- Date: 24 March 1901
- Venue: Jones' Road, Dublin
- Referee: A. McKeogh (Dublin)
- Attendance: 3,500

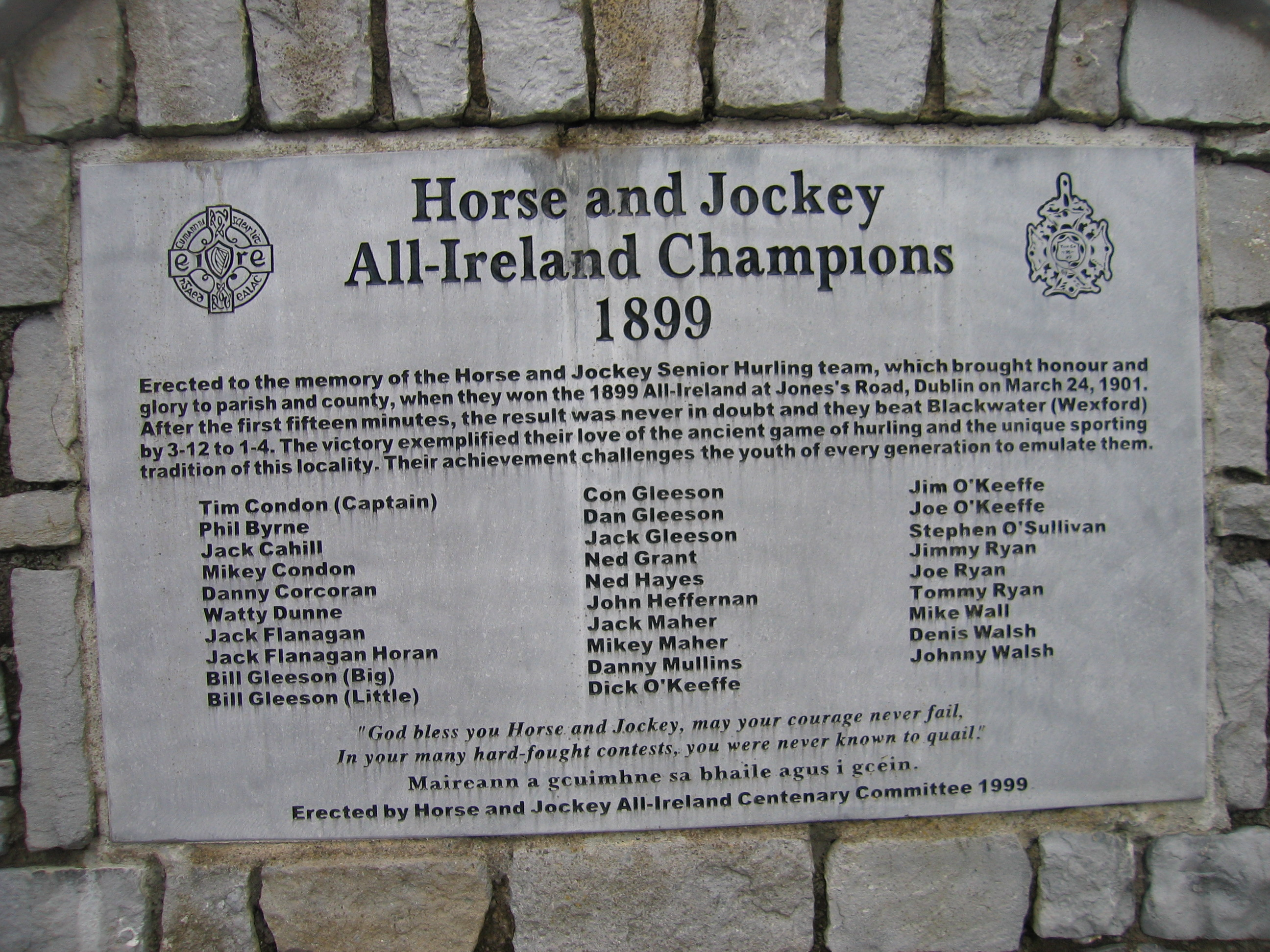
Commemorative plaque in Horse and Jockey

The 1899 All-Ireland Senior Hurling Championship Final was the 12th All-Ireland Final and the culmination of the 1899 All-Ireland Senior Hurling Championship, an inter-county hurling tournament for the top teams in Ireland. The match was held at Jones' Road, Dublin, on 24 March 1901 between Wexford, represented by club side Blackwater, and Tipperary, represented by club side Moycarkey. The Leinster champions lost to their Munster opponents on a score line of 3–12 to 1–4.

== Match details ==
1900-03-24

Tipperary	3-12 – 1-4	Wexford

Jones' Road, Dublin
Attendance: 3,500
Referee: A. McKeogh (Dublin)
