= 1950 All-Ireland Minor Hurling Championship =

All-Ireland Minor Hurling Championship 1950
All Ireland Champions
- Winners: Kilkenny (4th win)
- Captain: Pat Lennon

All Ireland Runners-up
- Runners-up: Tipperary
- Captain: Gerry Doyle

Provincial Champions
- Munster: Tipperary
- Leinster: Kilkenny
- Ulster: Antrim
- Connacht: Galway

The 1950 All-Ireland Minor Hurling Championship was the 20th staging of the All-Ireland Minor Hurling Championship since its establishment by the Gaelic Athletic Association in 1928.

Tipperary entered the championship as the defending champions.

On 3 September 1950 Kilkenny won the championship following a 3-4 to 1-5 defeat of Tipperary in the All-Ireland final. This was their fourth All-Ireland title and their first in 14 championship seasons.

== Results ==
=== All-Ireland Minor Hurling Championship ===
Semi-finals

13 August 1950 Semi-final	Galway	0-05 - 6-09	Tipperary	Tuam Stadium, Tuam

13 August 1950 Semi-final	Kilkenny	8-11 - 1-02	Antrim	Croke Park, Dublin

Final

3 September 1950 Final	Kilkenny	3-04 - 1-05	Tipperary	Croke Park, Dublin
13:30	T O'Hanrahan 2-2, S O'Brien 1-0, P Lennon 0-1, M Gardiner 0-1.		D O'Brien 1-0, L McDonnell 0-3, W McLoughney 0-1, D Nolan 0-1.

== Championship statistics ==
=== Miscellaneous ===
- Kilkenny defeat Tipperary in the championship for the first time since 1935.
