= Tim Condon =

Irish hurler (1876–1918)

Personal information
- Native name: Tadhg Condún (Irish)
- Born: 12 May 1876 Ballinure, County Tipperary, Ireland
- Died: 22 May 1918 (aged 42) Ballinure, County Tipperary, Ireland
- Occupation: Plasterer

Sport
- Sport: Hurling
Clubs
- Years: Club
- Horse and Jockey; Boherlahen-Dualla
Club titles
- Tipperary titles: 2
Inter-county
- Years: County
- 1896–1907: Tipperary
Inter-county titles
- Munster titles: 3
- All-Irelands: 3

Timothy Condon (12 May 1876 – 22 May 1918) was an Irish sportsperson. He played hurling with his local clubs Horse and Jockey and Tubberadora and was a member of the Tipperary senior hurling team between 1896 and 1907.

== Biography ==
Raised in Ballinure, County Tipperary, Condon was born to Michael Condon, a slater, and his wife Johanna. After a brief education he later worked as a plasterer in his local area.

Condon first came to prominence as a hurler with the Tubberadora club with whom he won a Tipperary Championship medal in 1898. He later won a second championship medal as captain of the Horse and Jockey in 1898.

After impressing at club level, Condon joined the Tipperary senior hurling team during the 1896 championship. Over the following four seasons he won All-Ireland Championship medals in 1896, 1898 and as captain in 1899 after respective defeats of Dublin, Kilkenny and Wexford. Condon also won three Munster Championship medals. He continued to play for Tipperary at various times until 1907.

Condon died from tuberculosis on 22 May 1918.

== Honours ==
Tubberadora

- Tipperary Senior Hurling Championship (1): 1898

Horse and Jockey

- Tipperary Senior Hurling Championship (1): 1899 (c)

Tipperary

- All-Ireland Senior Hurling Championship (3): 1896, 1898, 1899 (c)
- Munster Senior Hurling Championship (3): 1896, 1898, 1899 (c)

Sporting positions
Preceded by Mikey Maher	Tipperary Senior Hurling Captain; 1899	Succeeded by Ned Hayes
Achievements
Preceded by Mikey Maher	All-Ireland Senior Hurling Final winning captain 1899	Succeeded by Ned Hayes
