= 1899 All-Ireland Senior Hurling Championship =

All-Ireland champions
- Winning team: Tipperary (5th win)
- Captain: Tim Condon

All-Ireland Finalists
- Losing team: Wexford
- Captain: Jim Furlong

Provincial champions
- Munster: Tipperary
- Leinster: Wexford
- Ulster: Not Played
- Connacht: Not Played

Championship statistics
- All-Star Team: See here

The All-Ireland Senior Hurling Championship 1899 was the 13th series of the All-Ireland Senior Hurling Championship, Ireland's premier hurling knock-out competition. Tipperary won the championship, beating Wexford 3–12 to 1–4 in the final.

== Format ==
All-Ireland Championship

Final: (1 match) The Munster and Leinster champions play in this game to determine the All-Ireland champions.

== Provincial championships ==
=== Leinster Senior Hurling Championship ===
Semi-final

Wexford	4–7 – 0–1	Offaly

Jones's Road, Dublin

Final

Wexford	2–12 – 1–4	Dublin

=== Munster Senior Hurling Championship ===
Semi-final

Tipperary	w.o. – scr.	Limerick

Tipperary

Semi-final

Cork	3–4 – 2–9	Clare

Tipperary

Final

Tipperary	5–16 – 0–8	Clare

Markets Field, Limerick

== All-Ireland Senior Hurling Championship ==
=== All-Ireland Final ===
24 March 1901
Final

Tipperary	3–12 – 1–4	Wexford

Jones's Road, Dublin
Attendance: c.3,500
Referee: A. McKeogh (Dublin)

== Championship statistics ==
=== Miscellaneous ===
- The All-Ireland final between Tipperary and Wexford was abandoned near the end. Since Tipperary were winning by a considerable margin at that stage it was decided to award them the championship title.
- Tipperary win their 5th All-Ireland title to become outright leaders on the all-time roll of honour. It is a position they will retain until 1942.

== Sources ==
- Corry, Eoghan, The GAA Book of Lists (Hodder Headline Ireland, 2005).
- Donegan, Des, The Complete Handbook of Gaelic Games (DBA Publications Limited, 2005).
