= Oliver McGrath =

Wexford hurler

Oliver 'Hopper' McGrath
Personal information
- Native name: Oilibhéar Mac Craith (Irish)
- Born: Wexford, Ireland

Sport
- Sport: Hurling
- Position: Forward
Club
- Years: Club
- Faythe Harriers
Club titles
- Wexford titles: 3
Inter-county
- Years: County
- 1950s–1960s: Wexford
Inter-county titles
- Leinster titles: 3
- All-Irelands: 1
- NHL: 1

Oliver 'Hopper' McGrath (born 1938 in Wexford, Ireland) is a former Irish sportsman. He played hurling with his local club Faythe Harriers and at senior level for the Wexford county team in the 1950s and 1960s.

== Playing career ==
=== Club ===
McGrath played his club hurling with the Faythe Harriers club in Wexford. He had much success, beginning with the capturing of three minor county titles in a row from 1954 to 1956. He was a key part of the team when the club collected their first senior county title in 1960. McGrath added two further county medals to his collection in 1962 and 1965. During this time Faythe Harriers were also regarded as the unofficial Leinster club champions.

=== Inter-county ===
McGrath first came to prominence on the inter-county scene as a member of the Wexford minor hurling team in the mid-1950s. He played in two consecutive Leinster finals in this grade in 1955 and 1956, however, Kilkennydenied Wexford on both occasions. McGrath made his senior debut in the National Hurling League in the autumn of 1956 and he quickly became a regular on the team. Two years later in 1958 he captured his first major success in the form of a National League title. Two years after in 1960 he won his first senior Leinster title as Wexford got the better of Kilkenny in the provincial decider. McGrath later lined out in his first All-Ireland final against Tipperary. It was only the third ever meeting between these two sides in the championship. Tipp were the red-hot favourites and a certain over-confidence seemed to creep in. The game ended in remarkable circumstances as the crowd invaded the pitch with a minute to go, mistaking the referee’s whistle for the end of the game. When the crowd were finally moved off the pitch Tipperary continued playing with only twelve men, however, Wexford won the game on a score line of 2-15 to 0-11 giving McGrath his first All-Ireland medal. Wexford surrendered their provincial crown to Dublin in 1961, however, the team bounced back in 1962 with McGrath collecting his second provincial title. The team later squared up to Tipperary in the All-Ireland final, however, Wexford were not the force of old and the side got off to possibly the worst start ever by a team in a championship decider. After just ninety seconds the Leinster champions were down by 2 goals, however, the game turned out to be much closer than people expected. Tipp eventually secured the win on a score line of 3-10 to 2-11. In 1965 Wexford were back and McGrath collected a third Leinster title. Once again, the All-Ireland final saw Wexford taking on old foes Tipperary. The Munster men won comfortably by twelve points. McGrath retired from inter-county hurling shortly afterward.

=== Province ===
McGrath also lined out with Leinster in the inter-provincial hurling championship. He won one Railway Cup medal in 1962.
