= 1951 All-Ireland Minor Hurling Championship =

All-Ireland Minor Hurling Championship 1951
All Ireland Champions
- Winners: Cork (6th win)
- Captain: Johnny Clifford

All Ireland Runners-up
- Runners-up: Galway

Provincial Champions
- Munster: Cork
- Leinster: Kilkenny
- Ulster: Antrim
- Connacht: Galway

The 1951 All-Ireland Minor Hurling Championship was the 21st staging of the All-Ireland Minor Hurling Championship since its establishment by the Gaelic Athletic Association in 1928.

Kilkenny entered the championship as the defending champions. However, they were beaten by Galway in the All-Ireland semi-final replay.

On 2 September 1951 Cork won the championship following a 4–4 to 1–8 defeat of Galway in the All-Ireland final. This was their sixth All-Ireland title and their first in seven championship seasons.

== Results ==
=== Connacht Minor Hurling Championship ===
Final

2 July 1951 Final	Galway	6-09 - 2-01	Roscommon	St. Jarlath's Park, Tuam

=== Leinster Minor Hurling Championship ===
Final

22 July 1951 Final	Kilkenny	5-11 - 2-02	Dublin	Nowlan Park, Kilkenny

=== Munster Minor Hurling Championship ===
Final

29 July 1951 Final	Limerick	1-03 - 5-11	Cork	Gaelic Grounds, Limerick

=== Ulster Minor Hurling Championship ===
Final

22 July 1951 Final	Antrim	12-02 - 0-01	Down	Lurgan

=== All-Ireland Minor Hurling Championship ===
Semi-finals

29 July 1951 Semi-final	Galway	5-05 - 6-02	Kilkenny	Croke Park, Dublin

29 July 1951 Semi-final replay	Galway	8-03 - 4-06	Kilkenny	Croke Park, Dublin

12 August 1951 Semi-final	Cork	10-08 - 3-01	Antrim	Croke Park, Dublin

Final

2 September 1951 Final	Cork	4-05 - 1-08	Galway	Croke Park, Dublin
