= Harriet Bagwell =

Irish philanthropist

- Born: Harriet Philippa Jocelyn Newton c. 1853; Dunleckney Manor, Bagenalstown, County Carlow
- Died: 12 February 1937 (aged 83–84); Birdhill, Clonmel, County Tipperary
- Spouse: Richard Bagwell
- Children: 4, including John and Lilla

Harriet Bagwell (née Newton; c. 1853–1937) was an Irish philanthropist and promoter of local cottage industry.

== Life ==
Harriet Bagwell was born Harriet Philippa Jocelyn Newton around 1853 in Dunleckney Manor, Bagenalstown, County Carlow. She was the eldest child of Phillip Jocelyn Newton (1818–1895) and his wife Emily (d. 1886). She married Richard Bagwell on 9 December 1873. The couple had one son, John Philip, and three daughters, Emily Georgiana, Margaret and Lilla Minnie. For the first part of their marriage the family lived in Innislonagh, moving to the family estate at Marlfield House, Clonmel, County Tipperary in 1884. After this move, Bagwell became active in local charitable concerns. Her mother-in-law, Frances Bagwell (née Prittie), had founded a school for Swiss embroidery, and it is possible that this inspired Bagwell to found her own embroidery cottage industry at Marlfield in 1885. The aim of this was to enable women to work in their own homes to earn extra income. Bagwell provided these women with raw materials and designs, and organised their payment and sale of the produce. The designs were adapted from Egyptian and Indian artwork. The resulting Marlfield Embroideries was a success, and generated a great deal of income for the local community. Work from the Embroideries were exhibited at a number of shows, including the Royal Dublin Society's stand at the 1887 Royal Jubilee Exhibition in Manchester, and the 1897 Lancaster Arts and Craft Exhibition. Bagwell's older half-sister from her father's first marriage, Mrs Anne Vesey, founded the Dunleckney Cottage Embroidery in 1889 and was modelled on Marlfield.

Bagwell also established a society which provided penny meals to local people living in poverty, along with a registry office for servants. With her daughters, they created a cookery school for national school girls around 1900. In 1895 Bagwell founded the Clonmel Cottage Hospital, helped in the promotion of the District Nursing Association, and served as an executive committee member of the Women's National Health Association. After she was widowed in 1918, she left Marlfield in 1920, moving to Dangan, Carrickmines, County Dublin. During this time she compiled an informal history of the Bagwells for the family. This history included accounts of the burning of Marlfield House in 1923 by republicans. She died at the home of her young daughter, Lilla Minnie, Birdhill, Clonmel, on 12 February 1937.
