= Theo English =

Irish hurler (1930–2021)

Personal information
- Native name: Tomás Inglis (Irish)
- Nickname: T. O.
- Born: Thomas English; 5 July 1930 Marlfield, County Tipperary, Ireland
- Died: 10 January 2021 (aged 90) Clonmel, County Tipperary, Ireland
- Occupation: Oil salesman
- Height: 5 ft 9 in (175 cm)

Sport
- Sport: Hurling
- Position: Midfield
Club
- Years: Club
- Marlfield
Club titles
- Tipperary titles: 0
Inter-county*
| Years | County | Apps (scores) |
| 1953–1967 | Tipperary | 36 (4–12) |
Inter-county titles
- Munster titles: 7
- All-Irelands: 5
- NHL: 8
- *Inter County team apps and scores correct as of 20:19, 21 April 2015.

Thomas English (5 July 1930 – 10 January 2021), known as Theo English, was an Irish hurler and coach. As a player, he was noted as a tactician with "good ball control and excellent stickwork". English was, at the time of his retirement, the longest-serving midfielder the Tipperary senior hurling team ever had, and has been described as "one of Tipp[erary]'s finest hurlers".

In the late 1950s and early 1960s, the Tipperary senior hurling team rose to become one of the most dominant teams in the sport. English, having won an All-Ireland Junior Championship with Tipperary in 1953, was immediately drafted onto the senior team as a left wing-forward but was later transferred to midfield. It was a position he retained for 14 years. After winning the first of eight National Hurling League titles in his debut season, English won his first All-Ireland Senior Hurling title in the 1958 Championship before claiming four more winners' medals in five seasons between the 1961 season and 1965 season. He was also a seven-time Munster Championship winner. At club level, English spent more than 20 years playing for Marlfield and was involved in all four of the club's South Tipperary Championship-winning teams. With Munster he won four Railway Cup medals. After retiring from inter-county activity in 1967, English became a selector with Tipperary and was part of the All-Ireland Championship-winning management teams in the 1971 and 1989 Championships.

English was honoured with two Cú Chulainn Awards, the precursor to the All-Star, during his playing days. In retirement he came to be regarded as one of Tipperary's greatest-ever players and has been repeatedly voted onto teams made up of the sport's greats. In 2000, English was selected on the Tipperary Hurling Team of the Millennium. He was also named as one of hurling's 125 greatest players as part of the GAA 125 celebrations.

== Playing career ==
=== Marlfield ===
English's adult club career with Marlfield spanned over 20 years. Although he never won a County Senior Championship title, he was instrumental in Marlfield securing four South Tipperary Championship titles between 1960 and 1970. English, in retirement from playing, was honoured by being named club president.

=== Tipperary ===
==== Junior ====
English first came to prominence on the inter-county scene when he was drafted onto the Tipperary junior teams as a dual player. In July 1951, he had his first inter-county successes when the Tipperary junior hurling team secured the Munster Junior Championship title after a 4-08 to 3-02 win over Limerick. The following year, English became a dual provincial championship medallist when the Tipperary junior football team won their first Munster Junior Championship in 15 years after two-point win over Kerry in a final replay.

In August 1953, English made it three Munster Junior Championship titles in succession when Tipperary secured their first provincial hurling title in two years after a one-point defeat of Cork in the final. After success in an All-Ireland semi-final replay and the All-Ireland "home" final, Tipperary hosted Warwickshire in the All-Ireland final proper at Thurles Sportsfield. English ended the game with an All-Ireland Junior Championship medal after 4-10 to 1-03 victory.

==== Senior ====
English's success with the Tipperary junior team resulted in an immediate call-up to the senior team at the start of the 1953-54 National League. He made his first appearance for the team in November 1953 when he lined out at centre-forward in a 3-06 to 1-01 win over Clare in Division 1B. English was subsequently switched to midfield, and ended the league with his first senior silverware after Tipperary beat Kilkenny by 3-10 to 1-04 in the final. Later that season he made his Munster Championship debut in a semi-final win over Clare. English's performance in the 2-08 to 1-08 defeat by Cork in the subsequent final was described in the Irish Independent as being "head and shoulders over any of the other four midfielders."

Tipperary dominated the National League during English's first few seasons with the team, with the 1954 success being the first of four successive league final appearances. He claimed further league honours after a defeat of Wexford clinched the 1954-55 title and a win over Kilkenny secured the 1956-57 title. After a seven-year absence, Tipperary secured the 1958 Munster Championship after a 4-12 to 1-05 win over reigning champions Waterford. English, who collected his first championship winners' medal as a result of the victory, was described in the Irish Press as being "magnificent". His preparations for the 1958 All-Ireland final were hampered after dislocating the index finger in his right hand when playing a club football match the week before the final. English's performance in the All-Ireland final against Galway saw him claimed his first All-Ireland Championship after the 4-09 to 2-05 win.

English added to his National League medal collection when Tipperary secured the 1958-59 league with a 0-15 to 0-07 win over Waterford. He claimed a fifth league medal in seven seasons the following year when Tipperary retained the title after a 2-15 to 3-08 win over Cork in the 1960 final. The subsequent Munster Championship campaign saw English claim his second winners' medal after giving a "sound, without being spectacular" performance in the two-point win over Cork. A groin injury meant that he was a doubt for the 1960 All-Ireland final right up to the day of the match, however, according to the Cork Examiner reporter, he played the "greatest 30 minutes of his career" but ultimately ended up in the losing side after the 2-15 to 0-11 defeat.

Tipperary's dominance of the National League continued in 1960-61, with English collecting a sixth winners' medal after Tipperary secured a third successive title following a three-point win over Waterford. Tipperary subsequently retained the Munster Championship, with English adding a third provincial medal to his collection after dominating midfield with his partner Liam Devaney in the 3-06 to 0-07 win over Cork. After later making a third All-Ireland final appearance in four years, he ended the season with a second All-Ireland winners' medal after the 0-16 to 1-12 win over Dublin.

A defeat by Kilkenny in the group stage of the 1961-62 league ended Tipperary's hopes of a fourth successive title. In spite if this, Tipperary secured a third successive Munster Championship title, with English claiming a fourth winners' medal after the 5-14 to 2-03 win over Waterford. The 1962 All-Ireland final saw English win a third All-Ireland Championship title in five years, after once again lining out at midfield in the 3-10 to 2-11 defeat of Wexford.

In spite of an unsuccessful 1963 season, English ended the year by being named as midfield partner to Dublin's Des Ferguson on the 1963 Team of the Year. Tipperary went undefeated during the 1963-64 National League, with English claiming a seventh league medal after a 4-16 to 6-06 win over New York in the final proper. He subsequently added a fifth provincial title to his collection after Tipperary's 14-point win over Cork to secure the 1964 Munster Championship title. Tipperary had an average winning margin of 16 points throughout the championship, with English claiming a fourth All-Ireland medal following a 5-13 to 2-08 win over Kilkenny in the 1964 All-Ireland final.

In July 1965, English won the sixth provincial medal of his career after a 4-11 to 0-05 defeat of Cork in the 1965 Munster final. Contemporary newspaper reports described him as being "seldom out of position", in what was his fifth winners' medal in six seasons. The victory qualified Tipperary for a fifth All-Ireland final appearance in six seasons, with English claiming his fifth and final All-Ireland winners' medal following the 2-16 to 0-10 win over Wexford. Tipperary's bid for a third successive All-Ireland title ended with a 1966 Munster quarter-final defeat by Limerick. In spite of this defeat, English ended the season by earning selection on the Team of the Year.

In July 1967, Tipperary qualified for their seventh Munster final in eight seasons, with English making his eighth final appearance overall. The Irish Independent singled out the midfield pair of English and Mick Roche for particular praise in the 4-12 to 2-06 win over Clare. This win qualified Tipperary for their sixth All-Ireland final of the decade, with Kilkenny providing the opposition. 37-year-old English, though still not the oldest member of the team, was described by reporter Mick Dunne as being "too frequently outwitted" by Kilkenny midfielder Paddy Moran, and ended the game on the losing side after a first All-Ireland final defeat by Kilkenny in 45 years. The game marked his last appearance for the Tipperary team.

=== Munster ===
English's performances at inter-county level earned him a call-up to the Munster team in advance of the 1959 Railway Cup, in what was the first of seven consecutive seasons on the inter-provincial team. He made his first appearance for the team in the 1959 final victory over Connacht, in what was the first of three consecutive final wins. Defeat in the 1962 final was followed by claiming a fourth and final winners' medal the following year. English's last two years with the Munster team ended in final defeats by Leinster.

== Post-playing career ==
In retirement from playing English continued his involvement on the inter-county scene as a selector. He was a key member of the backroom team when Tipperary won both Munster and All-Ireland titles in 1971. In the 1980s English served as a selector under Babs Keating. Together with former player Donie Nealon they guided Tipp to three successive Munster titles and an All-Ireland title in 1989.

In 2000 English was chosen, by popular opinion, to partner Mick Roche at midfield on the Tipperary Hurling Team of the Century.

English's death was announced on 10 January 2021, at the age of 90.

== Honours ==
=== Player ===
Marlfield

- South Tipperary Senior Hurling Championship: 1960, 1962, 1964, 1970

Tipperary

- All-Ireland Senior Hurling Championship: 1958, 1961, 1962, 1964, 1965
- Munster Senior Hurling Championship: 1958, 1960, 1961, 1962, 1964, 1965, 1967
- National Hurling League: 1953–54, 1954–55, 1956–57, 1958–59, 1959–60, 1960–61, 1963–64, 1964–65
- All-Ireland Junior Hurling Championship: 1953
- Munster Junior Hurling Championship: 1953
- Munster Junior Football Championship: 1952

Munster

- Railway Cup: 1959, 1960, 1961, 1963

=== Selector ===
Tipperary

- All-Ireland Senior Hurling Championship: 1971, 1989
- Munster Senior Hurling Championship: 1971, 1987, 1988, 1989
- National Hurling League: 1987–88

=== Individual ===
Player

- Tipperary Hurling Team of the Millennium: 2000
- 125 Greatest Stars of the GAA: 2009
- Cú Chulainn Award: 1963, 1966
