= Marlfield, Clonmel =

Marlfield Gort an Mharla
- Village
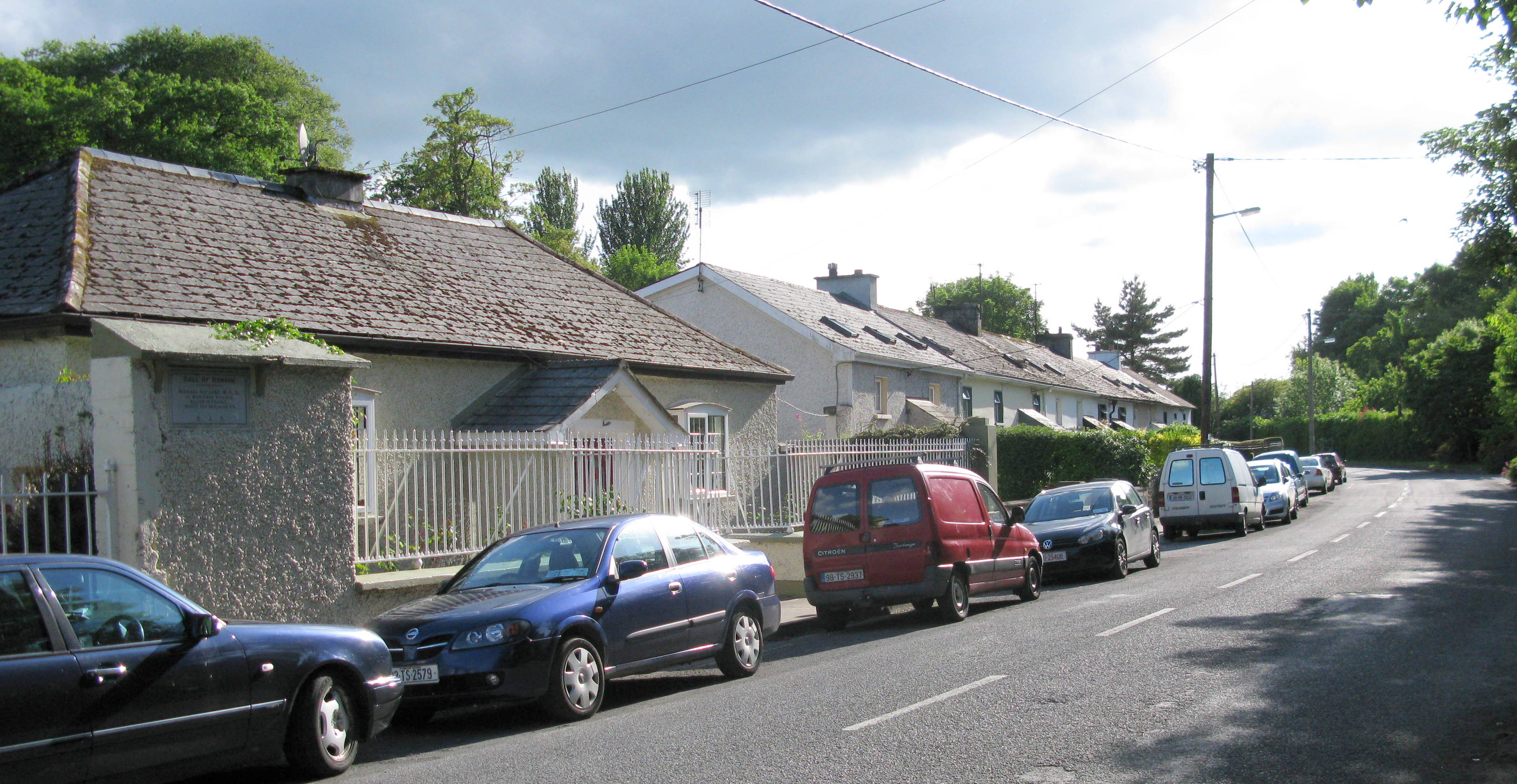
- Former village school and estate cottages.

- Location in Ireland
- Coordinates: 52°20′53″N 7°44′49″W
- Country: Ireland
- Province: Munster
- County: County Tipperary
- Time zone: UTC+0 (WET)
  - Summer (DST): UTC-1 (IST (WEST))
- Irish Grid Reference: S 1729 2182

Marlfield (Gaeilge:Gort an Mharla) is a village three kilometres west of Clonmel, County Tipperary, Ireland. It is within the townlands of Marlfield and Inishlounaght. It replaced an older settlement named Abbey, which had developed near the 12th century Cistercian community of Inislounaght Abbey.

== Local industry ==
Marlfield developed as a minor regional industrial centre using water from a tributary of the river Suir as a source of power. In 1773-74, Stephen Moore's was the largest grain mill in the country, processing 15,382 cwt in its 'boulting mill' that year. The lake was artificially constructed to run mill machinery, eventually powering hydroelectric current for the 'Big House'. There were several grain and rapeseed mills near the lake which were superseded by a substantial distillery. Andrew Stein's Pot still at Marlfield was producing 8, 268 Imperial gallons of whiskey per week in 1818. It was eventually taken over by Jamesons before it too was closed. In 1886, Marlfield Embroideries was established by Mrs. Bagwell to give employment to local women and girls. Marlfield was for many generations the seat of the Bagwell family, who owned much of the land and other resources in the area. The terrace of houses and nearby school, which formed the core of the village, were built for the estate workers.

== Marlfield/Abbey during the famine ==
In 1837, ten years before the height of the famine, Marlfield was recorded as having a population of 1,123 inhabitants, many of whom were employed at John Stein's distillery. Like much of the rest of rural Ireland, the poor of Marlfield suffered greatly during the Great famine. While there were local acts of philanthropy to help alleviate starvation, there were documented cases where food convoys and barges transporting flour and grain were attacked by desperate residents. These incidents of 'lawlessness' were viewed with little sympathy by local establishment figures.

== Sport ==
The village is home to Marlfield GAA club, which promotes hurling in the area.

In 2009 Marlfield was the start and finish points for the 'Bill Hyland Memorial' cycle race. This is a road event organised annually by the Clonmel Cycle Club.

== People associated with Marlfield ==
- John Philip Bagwell (1874–1946) General manager of the Great Northern Railway, MP and Irish Free State Senator.
- Richard Bagwell (1840–1918) Historian and Unionist MP.
- Theo English (1931 - 2021) Retired Sportsperson, played hurling with Marlfield and the Tipperary team.

== Points of local interest ==
- Marlfield House. Burned by anti-Treaty Republicans in January, 1923, and subsequently rebuilt.
- St. Patrick's Church.
- Marlfield Cottage, Moore’s Road.
- Marlfield Lake. Artificial reservoir fed by springs at St. Patrick's Well, it was used to supply power to local mills. It is now a wildlife sanctuary and public amenity.
- St. Patrick's Well
- Sandybanks. Formerly a favourite swimming area on the Suir. During summer holidays, large crowds from Clonmel made their way here to swim before the provision of the town's first indoor pool in 1973.
- Memorial to local soldiers who died in the 1914-18 war.

=== Gallery ===
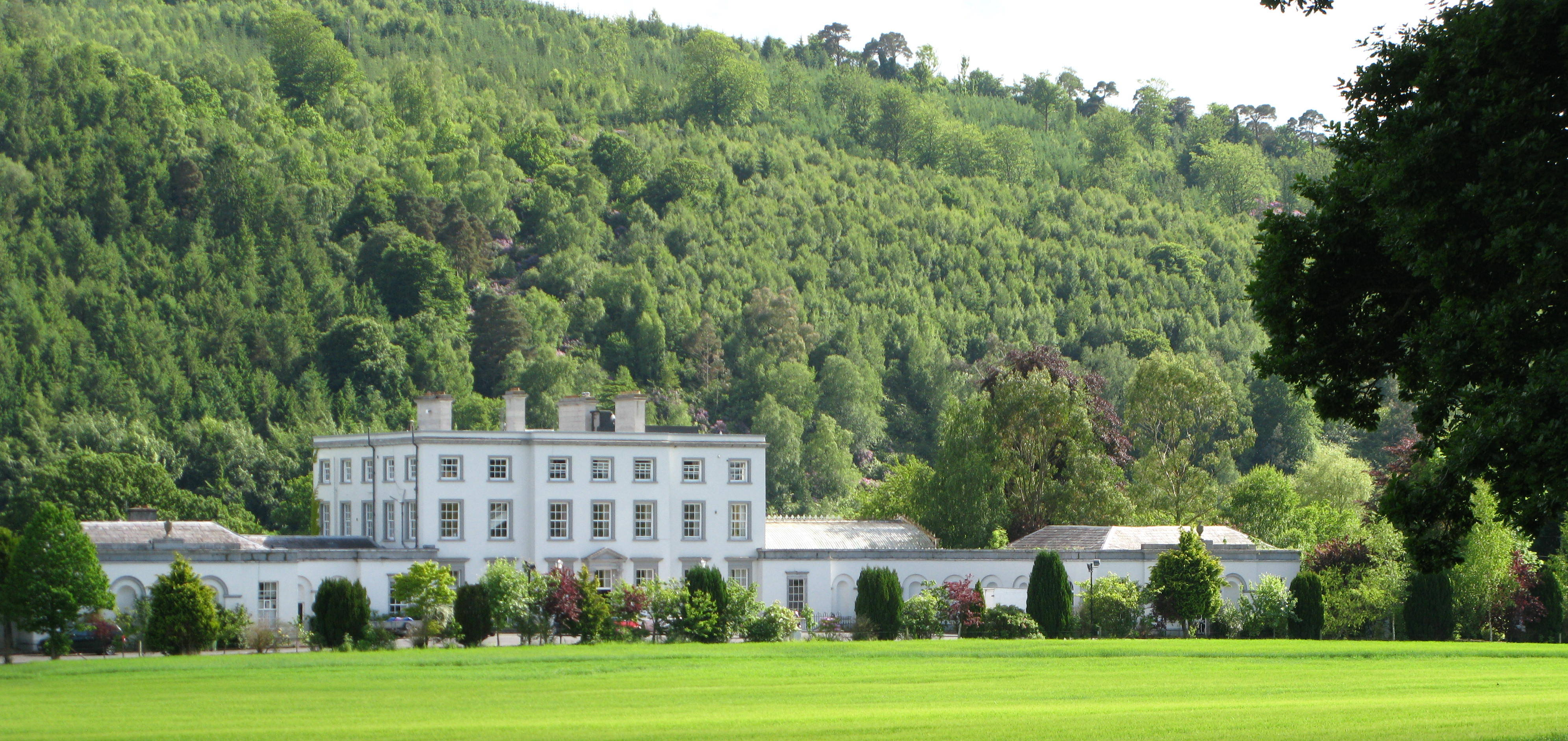
Marlfield house, formerly the seat of the Bagwell dynasty.

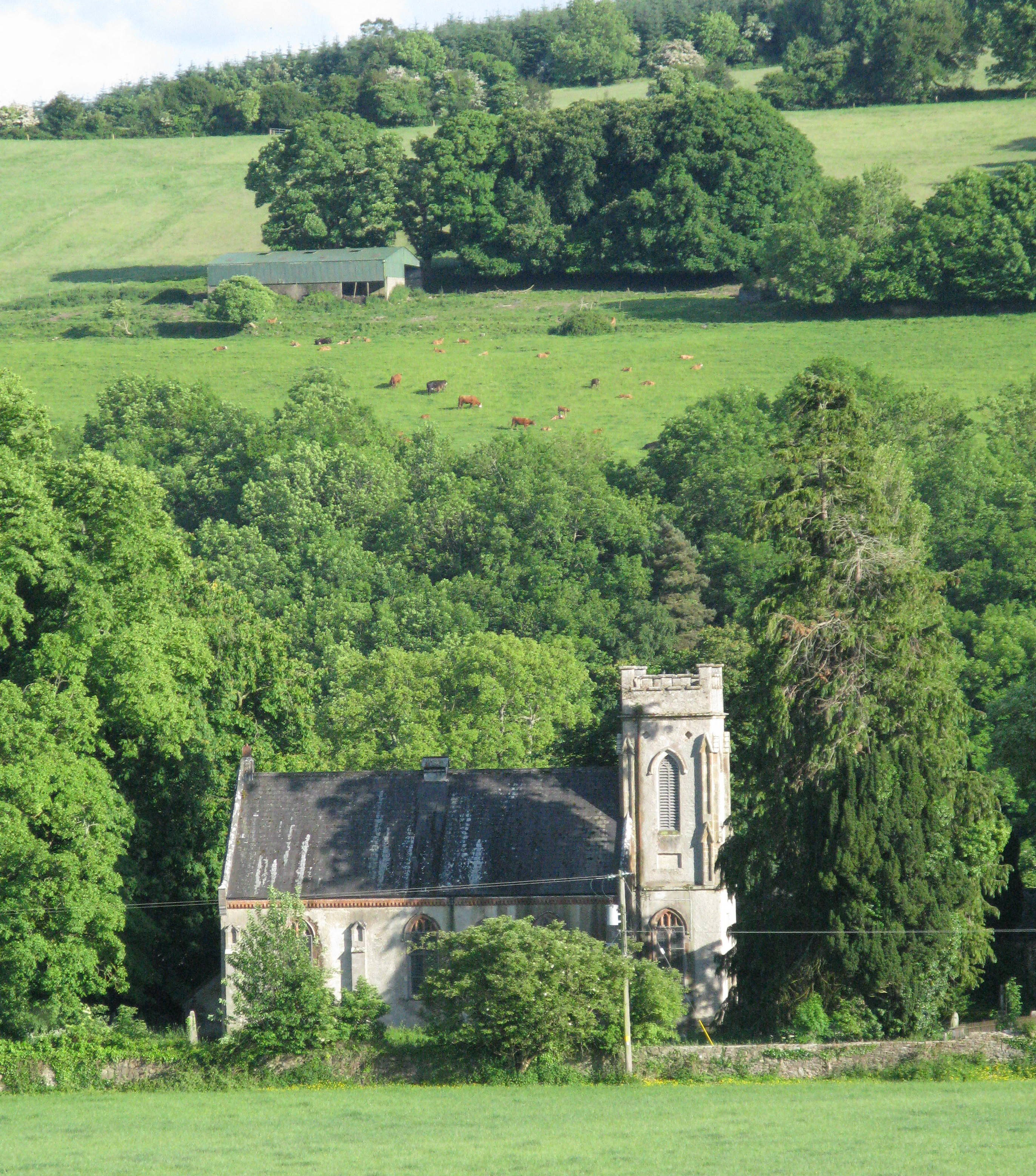
View of St. Patrick's church from the village.

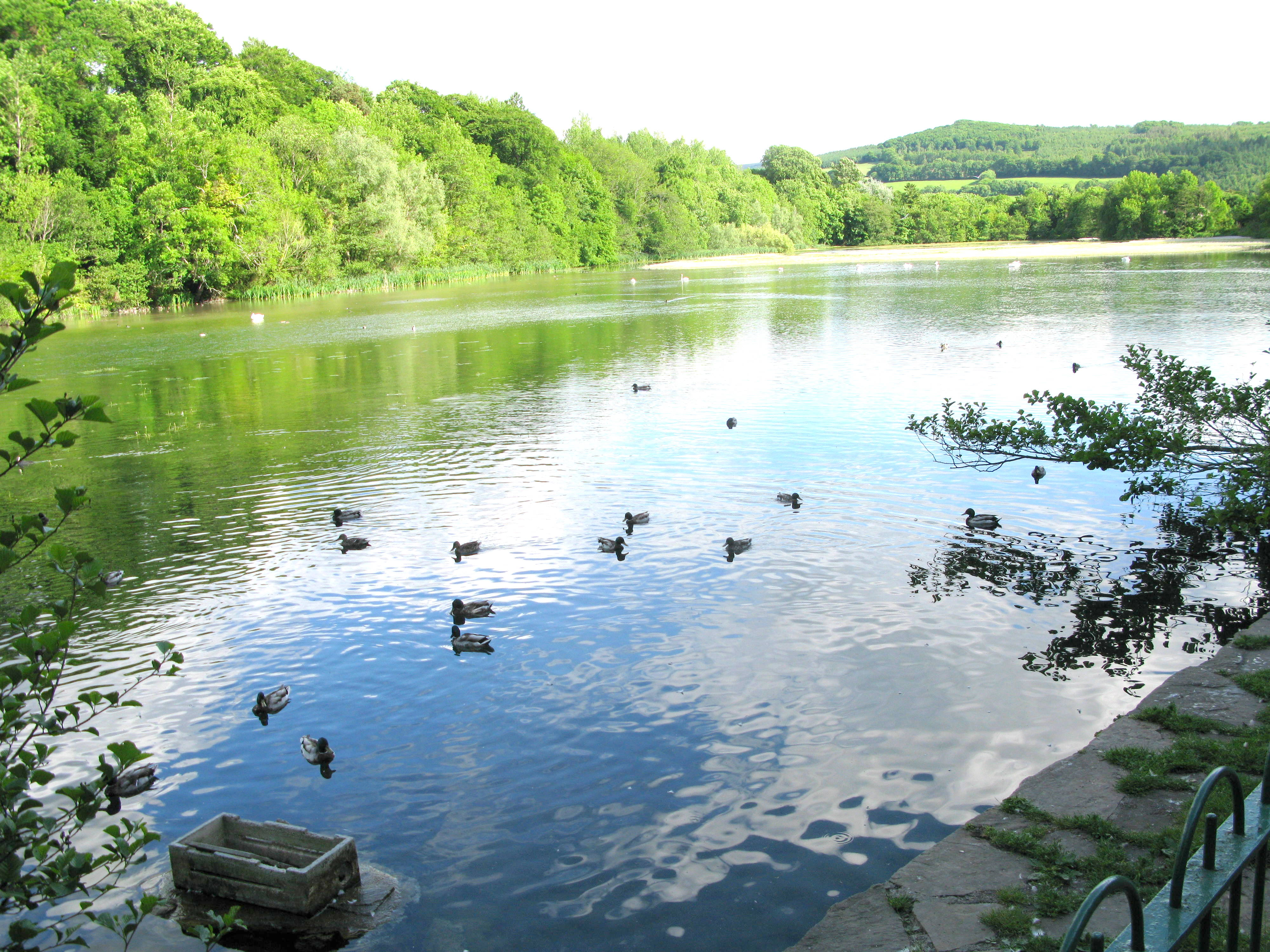
Marlfield lake, a wildlife sanctuary.

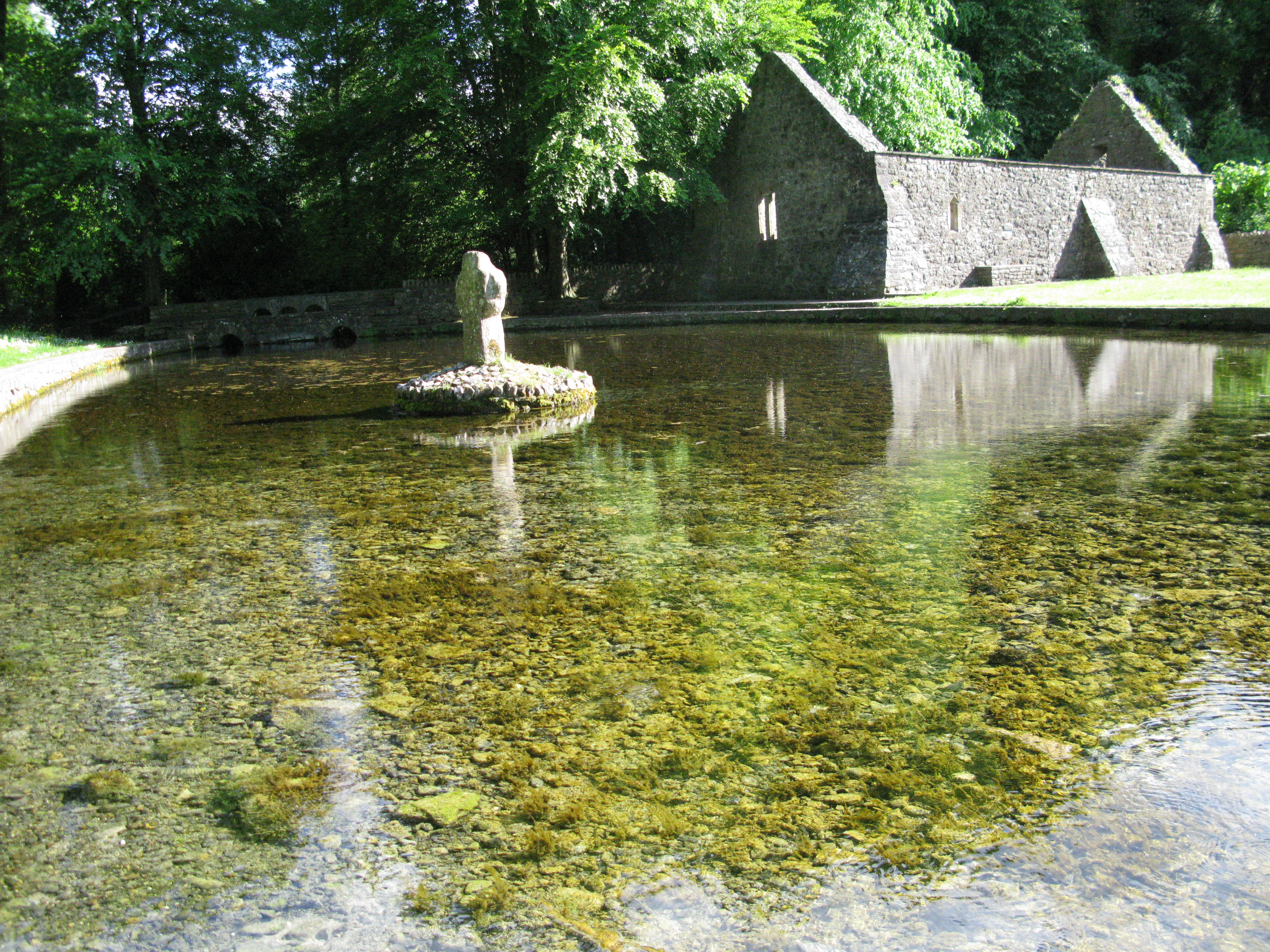
View of nearby St, Patrick's well.

== See also ==
- List of towns and villages in Ireland
