= John Philip Bagwell =

Irish businessman and politician (1874–1946)

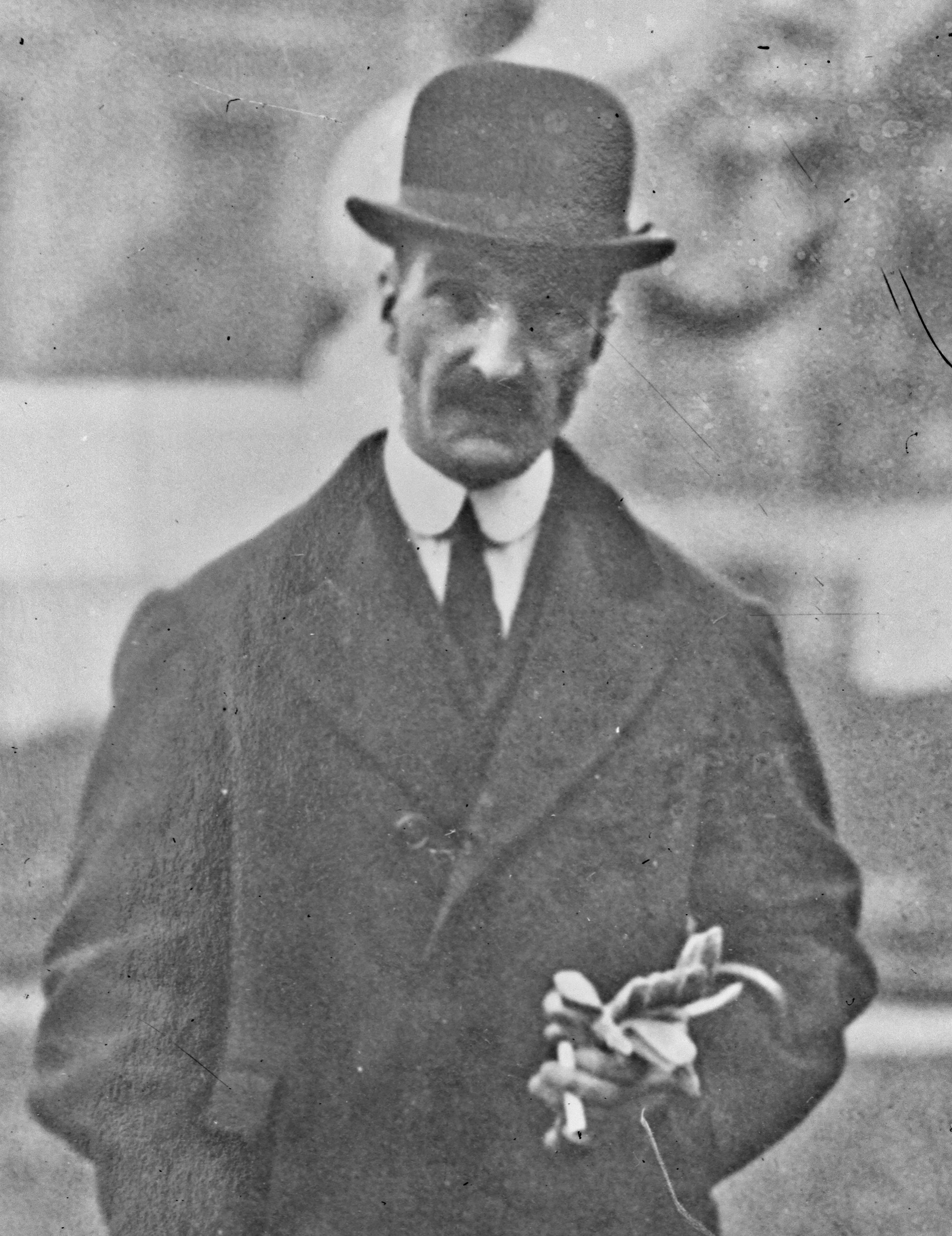
- Bagwell in 1922

Senator
- In office 11 December 1922 – 29 May 1936

Personal details
- Born: 11 August 1874 Lower Baggot Street, Dublin, Ireland
- Died: 22 August 1946 (aged 72) County Tipperary, Ireland
- Party: Independent
- Spouse: Louisa Shaw (m. 1901)
- Children: 3
- Parents: Richard Bagwell (father); Harriet Newton (mother)
- Relatives: John Bagwell (grandfather); Lilla Minnie Perry (sister)
- Education: Trinity College, Oxford

John Philip Bagwell (11 August 1874 – 22 August 1946) was an Irish businessman and politician.

== Early life and family ==
Bagwell was born on 11 August 1874, the son of Harriet Newton and Richard Bagwell. The Bagwells of Marlfield could trace their arrival in Ireland to John Bagwell (Backwell), a captain in Cromwell's New Model Army.

He was educated at Harrow School and Trinity College, Oxford.

Bagwell married Louisa Shaw in 1901, the daughter of George Shaw, a Major General. They had three children. He was commissioned a second lieutenant in the 4th (Militia) Battalion of the Royal Irish Regiment on 7 March 1900, and promoted to lieutenant on 28 July 1900.

== Business ==
After Oxford, he joined the Midland Railway, England, where he served as an assistant superintendent of line from 1905 to 1909. He then returned to Ireland and served as superintendent of passenger services from 1910 to 1911. Bagwell was general manager of Ireland's Great Northern Railways (GNR) between 1911 and 1926.

== Politics ==
Bagwell became an independent member of Seanad Éireann in the Irish Free State in 1922, and held that office until 1936. He was nominated to the Seanad by the President of the Executive Council in 1922 for 6 years. He was elected for six years in 1928. He was re-elected for a further six years in 1934, but served until the abolition of the Free State Seanad in 1936.

During the Irish Civil War he was kidnapped from near his house in Howth and held hostage by anti-Treaty forces in the Dublin Mountains. The Free State government responded by issuing a proclamation to the effect that if Bagwell were not safely released, reprisals would be taken.

Bagwell, however, maintained that he escaped his captors through his own efforts and his safe release could not be attributed to these threats. At around the same time, the family residence at Marlfield House, Clonmel, County Tipperary, was burned by anti-Treaty forces and the library of rare historical documents destroyed.
