= Marlfield Distillery =

Defunct Irish whiskey distillery

- Location: Marlfield
- Founded: 1817
- Founder: John Stein & Co.
- Status: Defunct
- Water source: St. Patrick's Well
- No. of stills: In 1856: 2 pot stills (9,980 gallon Wash still, 5,890 gallon Low Wines still), 1 Coffey Still (2,000 gallons per hour)
- Mothballed: 1856

Marlfield Distillery was an Irish whiskey distillery which operated in the village of Marlfield, just outside of Clonmel, Ireland between approximately 1817 and 1856.

The majority of the distillery buildings have since been demolished, aside from those adjacent to Distillery House, which is still extant.

== History ==
The distillery was established in 1817 by a business consortium which included members of the Steins, a noted family of distillers from Scotland. The firm traded as “John Stein & Co.”, named for the principal of the firm, though operations at the distillery were overseen by John’s brother Andrew. Others likely to have had a stake in the firm, though not necessarily when it was founded, include John Brown, John Murray, and Richard Sparrow.

The distillery was located in an old mill which the firm had converted for distilling purposes. In 1818, it is recorded as producing 8,268 proof gallons per week using a 500 gallon pot still. By 1826, output had risen to 396,599 gallons per annum.

In 1834, the partnership was dissolved, with John Murray, one of the partners assuming control of the company, which subsequently traded under “John Murray & Co.”

In 1836, Marlfield Whiskey is recorded as selling in Clonmel Market for about 7 shillings a gallon.

By 1838, the distillery then thriving, though output figures are not available, is known to have employed 150 people and consumed nearly 90,000 barrels of malt barley per annum.

In 1846, during the height of the Great Famine, the Distillery is noted to have sold Indian Corn Meal to its labourers at 14 pence a stone, at a time when others were selling it to the public at 2 shillings (24 pence) a stone.

In 1850, the distillery was taken over by members of the famous Jameson distilling dynasty from Dublin. Henry Jameson, the son of John Jameson founder of Jameson Irish Whiskey, who resided in Marlfield for some time, and is mentioned in several newspaper articles in connection with the distillery at the time likely took charge of the distillery at that point. However, the business appears to have continued to trade under the name of “John Murray & Co.”

In August 1856, it was announced that the distillery was to be dismantled, the materials sold, and the buildings put up for lease. The plant and equipment, which included pumps, two pot stills, a Coffey still, vats, 15 draft horses, and Berkshire breeding sows, were advertised for sale by private contract in August 1856. A separate newspaper advert from the time listed the buildings for lease, with corn stores and paper milling being given as suggested uses for the buildings. The distillery’s fire engine was purchased by the local Corporation of Clonmel.

Marlfield Whiskey continued to be sold locally for a number of years after the distillery closed, while the remaining stocks of whiskey were wound down.

== See also ==
- Irish Whiskey
