= Marlfield GAA =

Gaelic games club in County Tipperary, Ireland

- Founded: 1946
- County: Tipperary
- Colours
- Grounds: Marlfield GAA Ground

Playing kits
Standard colours

Marlfield GAA is a Gaelic Athletic Association club located in Marlfield, County Tipperary in Ireland. The club is part of the South division of Tipperary GAA. They have been South Tipperary Senior Hurling Champions on four occasions.

== Honours ==
- South Tipperary Senior Hurling Championship:
  - Winner (4): 1960, 1962, 1964, 1970
- South Tipperary Junior Hurling Championship:
  - Winner (4): 1954, 1958, 1976, 1983
- South Tipperary Under-21 B Hurling Championship:
  - 1999

== Famous players ==
- Theo English
