= Birdhill =

Town in County Tipperary, Ireland

Birdhill Cnocán an Éin Fhinn
- Village
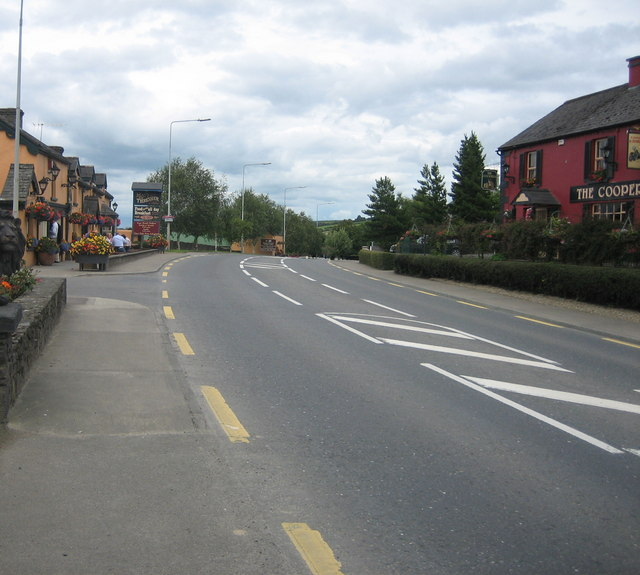
- The R445 regional road passes through Birdhill

- Location in Ireland
- Coordinates: 52°46′00″N 8°26′00″W
- Country: Ireland
- Province: Munster
- County: County Tipperary
- Time zone: UTC+0 (WET)
  - Summer (DST): UTC-1 (IST (WEST))

Birdhill (Irish: Cnocán an Éin Fhinn, meaning 'little hill of the fair bird') is a village in County Tipperary, Ireland. It is in the barony of Owney and Arra and is part of the parish of Newport, Birdhill and Toor in the Roman Catholic Archdiocese of Cashel and Emly. Its Irish name was historically anglicised as Knockan or Knockaneeneen.

== Myth ==
As recorded by J.F. Lynch, the village is, according to legend, named after an old Fianna story involving Oisín Mac Cumhaill. Upon returning from Tír na nÓg, Oisín met St.Patrick and annoyed the saint with his massive appetite. Oisín claimed that this was not for nothing; that in the time of the Fianna, everything was bigger. St. Patrick accused him of lying, so Oisín set off with his dog and a boy to find a massive bird (as well as a massive oak leaf and rowan berry). He fetched the Dord Fiann (horn of the Fianna) from a cave near Birdhill, and, once atop the height of the hill, used it to summon a bird as big as a cow. Oisín's dog killed the bird but then went mad, forcing Oisín to kill him. After then fetching the leaf and berry, he returned home with them and the corpse of the bird, proving to St. Patrick how big the food of the Fianna was. This story is written at the bottom of a sculpture of a bird in the village centre.

== Location ==
The village is located at the junction of the R445 (formerly N7), the R466, R504 and the R494 about 20 km from Limerick. The R494 route connects Birdhill to the M7. Traffic uses the existing slip roads with westbound traffic then passing over the motorway Bridge. There is a motorway service station operated by Applegreen at this bridge, the last station before Limerick. .

Bus transport is provided by Bus Éireann who provide multiple bus services a day to Limerick and Nenagh from Birdhill, on the 72, 323 and 323x routes.

== Railway line ==
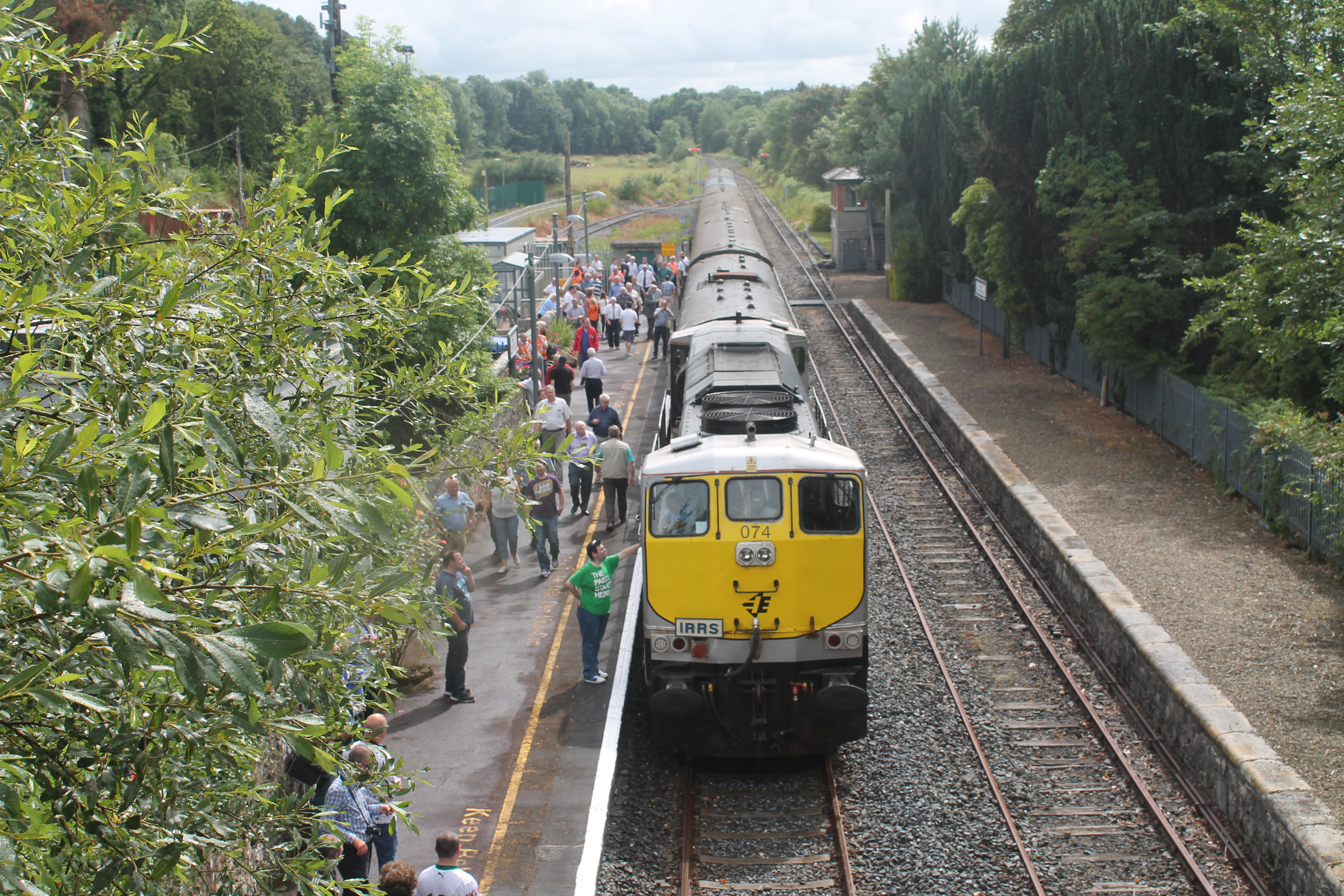
Birdhill railway station

Birdhill railway station is on the Limerick–Ballybrophy railway line. A January 2012 national newspaper article suggested that Irish Rail was expected to seek permission from the National Transport Authority to close the line. An enhanced timetable was in force during 2012 however the service was again reduced from February 2013..

Currently, Birdhill railway station is served by two weekday trains each way on the Limerick–Ballybrophy railway line and a skeleton service on the Limerick to Nenagh Commuter Service. There is a plan to increase this service to twice an hour by 2040.

== Demographics ==
The population of the Electoral Division of Birdhill was 743 in the 2022 census. However, this includes some individuals in the nearby village of Ballinahinch, as well as excluding some with Birdhill addresses such as Cooleen or Cragg. In general, as Birdhill is not a built up area, it is difficult to get an accurate estimate of the boundaries, and thus the population, of the village. Nevertheless, small area statistics for the 2022 census put the wider area at roughly 1,400.

Being such a small area, Birdhill has population peaks and troughs. There was a baby boom, for example, from roughly 2002/2003 to 2012/2013. This is reflected in 2022 census data, with most inhabitants being young people born between those years or those born 35-40 years earlier.

== River Shannon to Dublin pipeline ==
Plans were announced in 2011 for a pipeline from Lough Derg to supply drinking water to Dublin city and region. In 2016 the Parteen Basin at the south of lough was chosen as the proposed site of extraction. Water would be pumped via Birdhill to a break pressure tank at Knockanacree in County Tipperary and gravity fed from there to Peamount in Dublin.

== Awards ==
Birdhill was named the "Tidiest Village" in the Tidy Towns Awards in 2006, 2007, 2008, 2016 and again in 2017. In 2017, the village also took the overall award and was named Ireland's "Tidiest Town".

== Sport ==
Birdhill FC is the local soccer team, which competes in the North Tipperary District League. It fields a number of youth teams and one junior team, which competes in the NTDL Division 2. In February 2019, Birdhill FC won the NTDL Nora Kennedy Cup In July 2021, the men's junior team won the 2020/2021 NTDL Division 2 league title and were promoted up to the NTDL Division 1.

== Notable people ==
- William Atkins (1836–1920), Australian politician.
- Din Joe Crowley (1945–2016), Gaelic footballer
- John T. McDonough, American lawyer and politician.
- Lilla Minnie Perry, Irish landscape painter.

== See also ==
- List of towns and villages in Ireland
