= Tidy Towns (Ireland) =

Annual city competition in Ireland

Tidy Towns logo

Tidy Towns (Irish: Bailte Slachtmhara) is an annual competition, first held in 1958, organised by the Department of Rural and Community Development and the Gaeltacht in order to honour the tidiest and most attractive cities, towns and villages in the Republic of Ireland. The competition is organised on a national basis, and entrants must complete modules including Overall Developmental Approach (5 Year Plan), The Built Environment, Landscaping, Wildlife & Natural Amenities, Litter Control, Tidiness, Waste Minimisation, Residential Areas, Roads and Streets & Back Areas.

The Competition is judged during the summer months (May to August) by an independent adjudicator, who issues each town with a written report complimenting positive development and actions and providing positive suggestions on how the community can improve their general surroundings.

This competition covers many aspects of environment and prizes are awarded to winners of all areas. Other than that, there's an overall winner which is named as "Ireland's Tidiest Town" which is announced at the end of competition every September.

The 2020 competition was cancelled by Minister Michael Ring due to the COVID-19 pandemic in the Republic of Ireland for the first time in its history.

== Winners ==
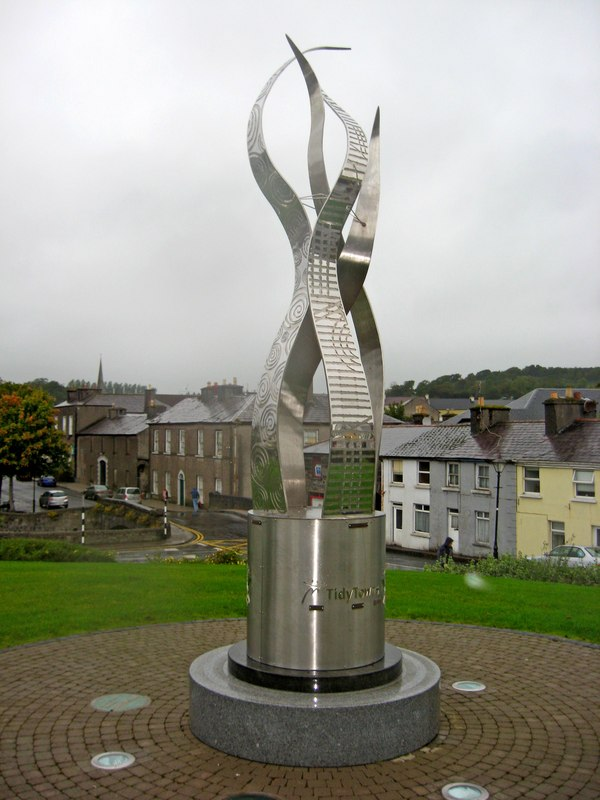
Tidy Towns monument in Westport

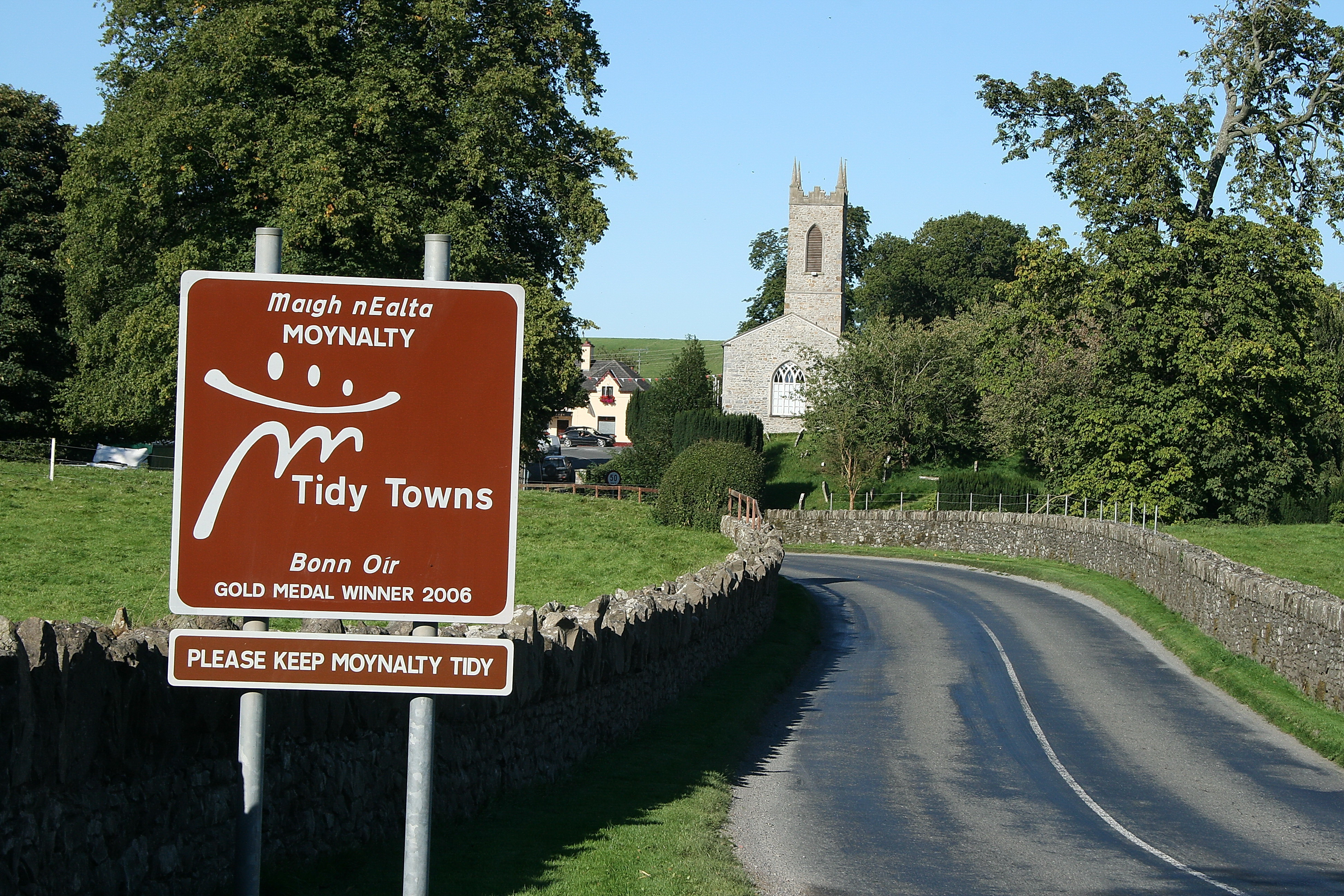
Moynalty won gold medal in 2006. It would go on to win the 2013 Tidy Towns competition.

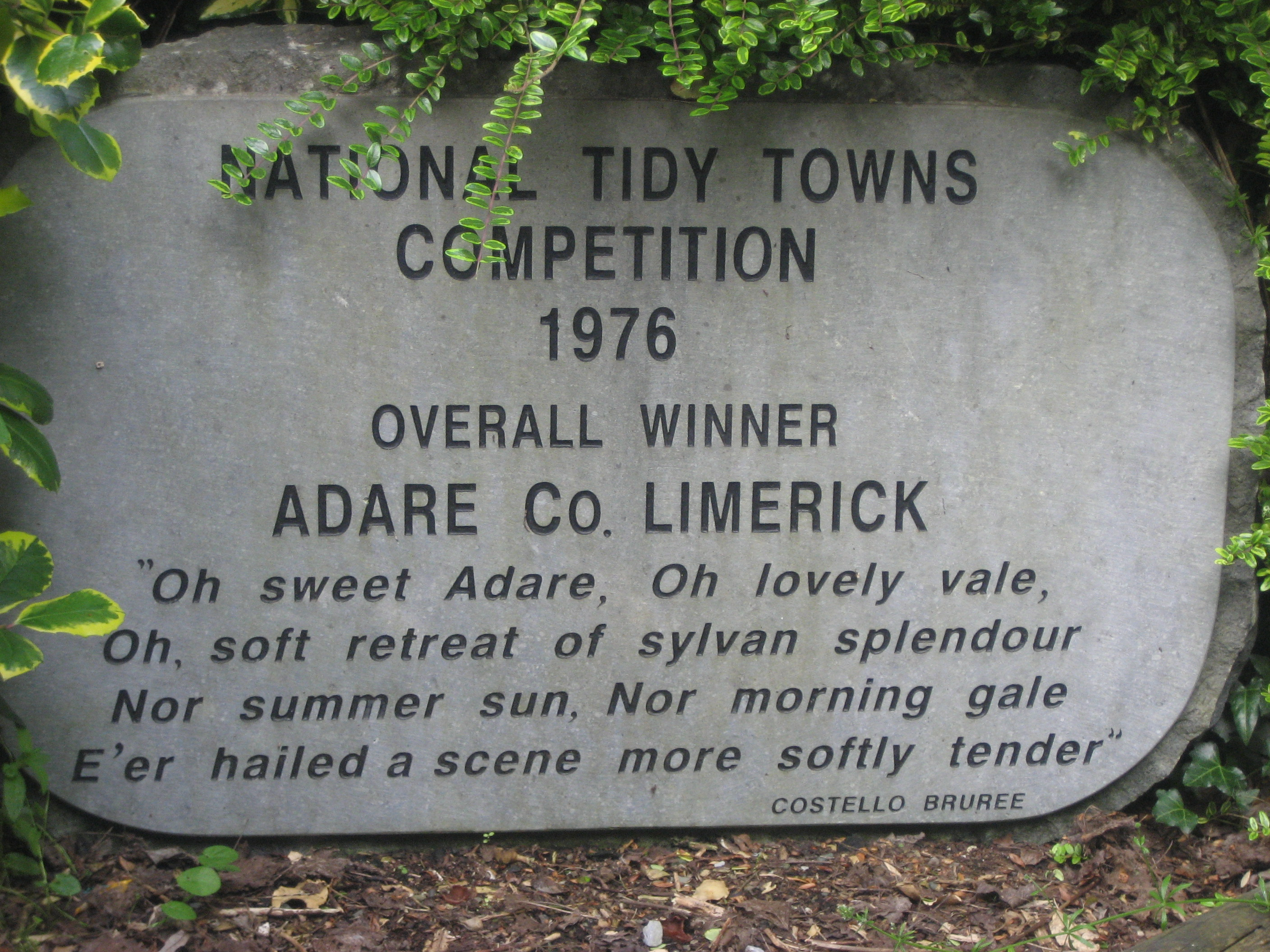
Sign commemorating Adare's 1976 victory.

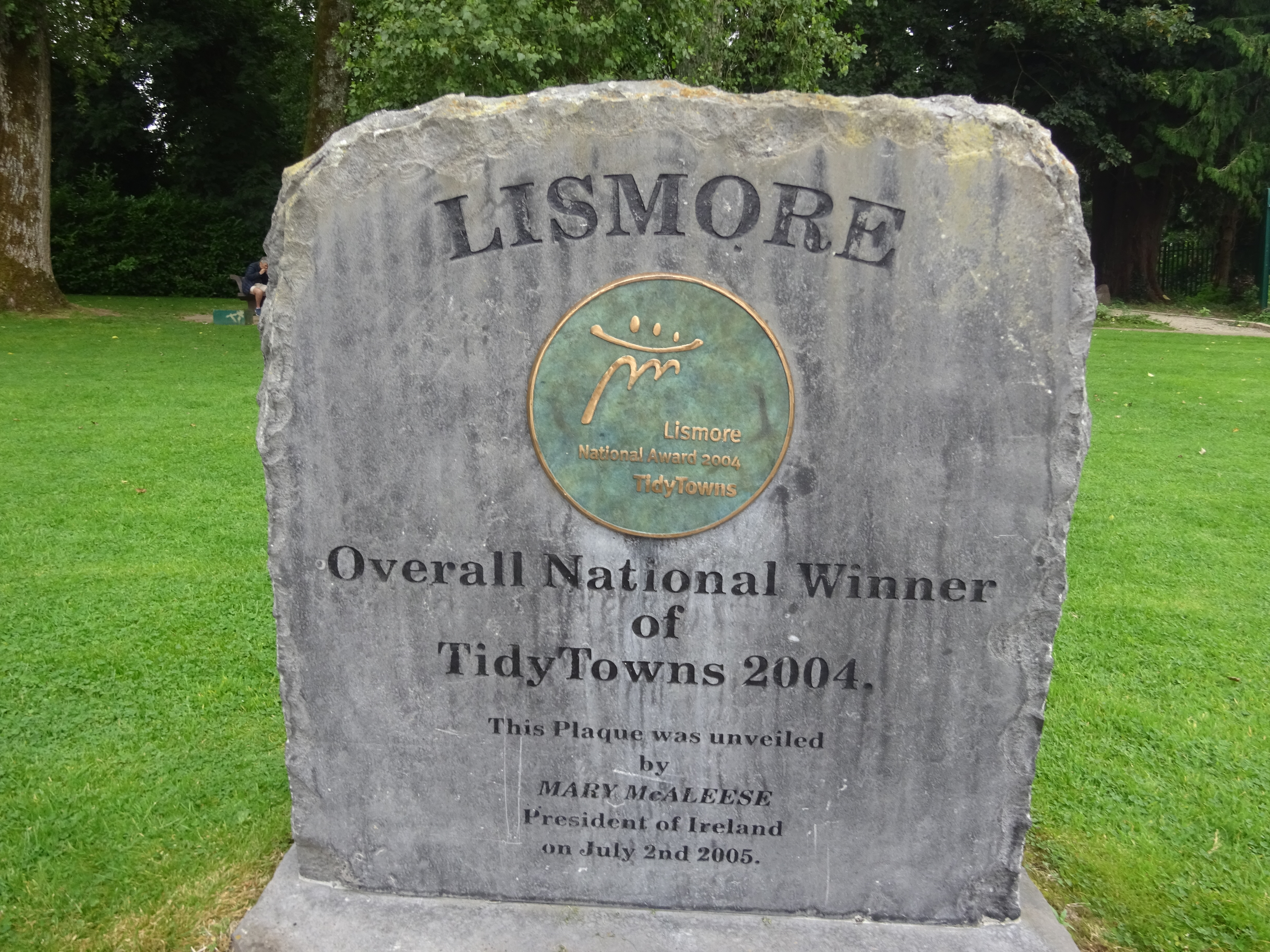
Sign in Lismore, commemorating the 2004 win.

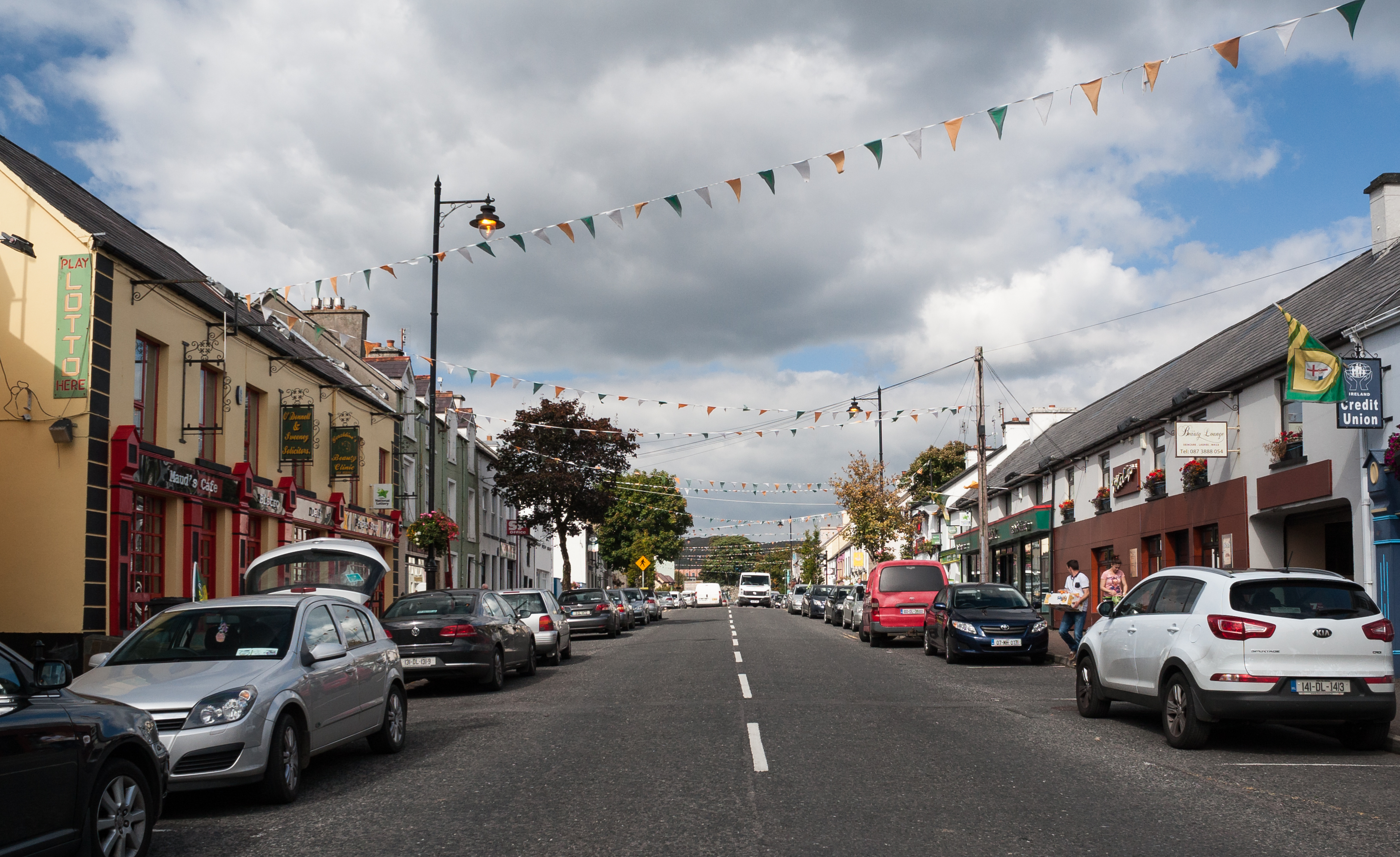
Glenties (Na Gleannta), County Donegal, the only town to win the overall award on five occasions.

Year	Overall winner	Village	Small Town	Large Town	Large Urban Centre
1958	Glenties	Not awarded	Not awarded	Not awarded	Not awarded
1959	Glenties (2)	Not awarded	Not awarded	Not awarded	Not awarded
1960	Glenties (3)	Not awarded	Not awarded	Not awarded	Not awarded
1961	Rathvilly	Not awarded	Not awarded	Not awarded	Not awarded
1962	Glenties (4)	Not awarded	Not awarded	Not awarded	Not awarded
1963	Rathvilly (2)	Not awarded	Not awarded	Not awarded	Not awarded
1964	Virginia, County Cavan	Not awarded	Not awarded	Not awarded	Not awarded
1965	Virginia, County Cavan (2)	Not awarded	Not awarded	Not awarded	Not awarded
1966	Ballyjamesduff	Not awarded	Not awarded	Not awarded	Not awarded
1967	Ballyjamesduff (2)	Not awarded	Not awarded	Not awarded	Not awarded
1968	Rathvilly (3)	Not awarded	Not awarded	Not awarded	Not awarded
1969	Tyrrellspass	Not awarded	Not awarded	Not awarded	Not awarded
1970	Malin	Not awarded	Not awarded	Not awarded	Not awarded
1971	Ballyconnell	Not awarded	Not awarded	Not awarded	Not awarded
1972	Trim	Not awarded	Not awarded	Not awarded	Not awarded
1973	Kiltegan	Not awarded	Not awarded	Not awarded	Not awarded
1974	Ballyconnell (2) & Trim (2)	Not awarded	Not awarded	Not awarded	Not awarded
1975	Kilsheelan	Not awarded	Not awarded	Not awarded	Not awarded
1976	Adare	Not awarded	Not awarded	Not awarded	Not awarded
1977	Multyfarnham	Not awarded	Not awarded	Not awarded	Not awarded
1978	Glaslough	Not awarded	Not awarded	Not awarded	Not awarded
1979	Kilsheelan (2)	Not awarded	Not awarded	Not awarded	Not awarded
1980	Newtowncashel	Not awarded	Not awarded	Not awarded	Not awarded
1981	Mountshannon	Not awarded	Not awarded	Not awarded	Not awarded
1982	Dunmanway	Not awarded	Not awarded	Not awarded	Not awarded
1983	Terryglass	Not awarded	Not awarded	Not awarded	Not awarded
1984	Trim	Not awarded	Not awarded	Not awarded	Not awarded
1985	Kilkenny	Not awarded	Not awarded	Not awarded	Not awarded
1986	Kinsale	Not awarded	Not awarded	Not awarded	Not awarded
1987	Sneem	Not awarded	Not awarded	Not awarded	Not awarded
1988	Carlingford	Not awarded	Not awarded	Not awarded	Not awarded
1989	Ardagh, County Longford	Not awarded	Not awarded	Not awarded	Not awarded
1990	Malahide	Not awarded	Not awarded	Not awarded	Not awarded
1991	Malin (2)	Not awarded	Not awarded	Not awarded	Not awarded
1992	Ardmore, County Waterford	Not awarded	Not awarded	Not awarded	Not awarded
1993	Keadue	Not awarded	Not awarded	Not awarded	Not awarded
1994	Galbally, County Limerick	Not awarded	Not awarded	Not awarded	Not awarded
1995	Glenties (5)	Not awarded	Not awarded	Not awarded	Not awarded
1996	Ardagh, County Longford (2)	Not awarded	Not awarded	Not awarded	Not awarded
1997	Terryglass (2)	Not awarded	Not awarded	Not awarded	Not awarded
1998	Ardagh, County Longford (3)	Not awarded	Not awarded	Not awarded	Not awarded
1999	Clonakilty	Not awarded	Not awarded	Not awarded	Not awarded
2000	Kenmare	Not awarded	Not awarded	Not awarded	Not awarded
2001	Westport	Not awarded	Not awarded	Not awarded	Not awarded
2002	Castletown, County Laois	Castletown, County Laois	Lismore, County Waterford	Ennis	Not awarded
2003	Keadue (2)	Keadue	Kenmare	Westport	Not awarded
2004	Lismore, County Waterford	Moynalty	Lismore, County Waterford	Westport	Not awarded
2005	Ennis	Moynalty	Lismore, County Waterford	Ennis	Not awarded
2006	Westport (2)	Birdhill	Aughrim, County Wicklow	Westport	Ennis
2007	Aughrim, County Wicklow	Birdhill	Aughrim, County Wicklow	Killarney	Letterkenny
2008	Westport (3)	Birdhill	Kenmare	Westport	Ennis
2009	Emly	Emly	Aughrim, County Wicklow	Westport	Ennis
2010	Tallanstown	Tallanstown	Lismore, County Waterford	Killarney	Kilkenny
2011	Killarney	Emly	Lismore, County Waterford	Killarney	Kilkenny
2012	Abbeyshrule	Abbeyshrule	Clonakilty	Westport	Ennis
2013	Moynalty	Moynalty	Kenmare	Killarney	Ennis
2014	Kilkenny (2)	Clonegal	Kilrush	Westport	Kilkenny
2015	Letterkenny	Clonegal	Listowel	Westport	Letterkenny
2016	Skerries	Birdhill	Listowel	Skerries	Ennis
2017	Birdhill	Birdhill	Clonakilty	Westport	Ennis
2018	Listowel	Glaslough	Listowel	Westport	Ballincollig
2019	Glaslough (2)	Glaslough	Blackrock, County Louth	Westport	Ennis
2020	Cancelled due to the COVID-19 pandemic in the Republic of Ireland				
2021	Ennis (2)	Geashill	Abbeyleix	Cobh	Ennis
2022	Trim (4)	Rosscarbery	Clonakilty	Trim	Ennis
2023	Abbeyleix	Geashill	Abbeyleix	Killarney	Ballincollig
2024	Ballincollig	Ballinahown	Blackrock	Westport	Ballincollig
2025	Carrick-on-Shannon	Rosscarbery	Carrick-on-Shannon	Dalkey	Tralee
2026	Ballinahown		Abbeyleix	Buncrana	Tralee

=== Summary map ===
Past overall winner
Category winner but never overall winner
