= Dunleckney Manor =

House in County Carlow, Ireland

Coordinates: 52.713667°N 6.939131°W

- Interactive map of the Dunleckney Manor area

General information
- Type: Manor house
- Location: Bagenalstown, County Carlow, Ireland

Dunleckney Manor is a manor house in Bagenalstown, County Carlow, Ireland.

== History ==
Sir Nicholas Bagenal built the original manor between 1585 and 1610. The current building dates from the 17th century. Around 1850, the heir to the Bagenal estate, Walter Newton, renovated the house, incorporating parts of the original structure.

In 1989, the house was purchased by Helen and Derek Sheane. The estate was in bad repair, requiring a new roof and extensive work to the windows and floors.

== Design ==
The manor was redesigned around 1835 by British architect Daniel Robertson (d.1849) in the Tudor gothic style. It features ashlar masonry, oriel windows, and fan-vaulted ceilings. The ornate wooden staircase includes several medieval wooden carvings from St Canice's Cathedral in nearby Kilkenny.

== See also ==
- List of country houses in County Carlow
