= 1963–64 National Hurling League =

33rd season of the National Hurling League

League details
- Dates: 29 September 1963 – 31 May 1964

League champions
- Winners: Tipperary (11th win)

Other division winners
- Division 2: Westmeath

The 1963–64 National Hurling League was the 33rd season of the National Hurling League.

== Division 1 ==
National Hurling League Division 1
- Season: 1963-64
- Champions: Tipperary; 11th National League title Captain: Seán McLoughlin
- Matches played: 23
- Top goalscorer: Jimmy Doyle (8-35)
- Biggest home win: Tipperary 9-14 - 1-4 Galway (29 September 1963)
- Biggest away win: Kilkenny 1-13 - 1-4 Galway (13 October 1963)
- Highest scoring: Tipperary 4-16 – 6-6 New York (31 May 1964)
- All statistics correct as of 4 March 2017.

Waterford came into the season as defending champions of the 1962-63 season.

On 31 May 1964, Tipperary won the title after a 4-16 to 6-6 aggregate win over New York in the final. It was their 11th league title overall and their first since 1960-61.

In spite of finishing at the bottom of their respective groups, neither Clare or Carlow were relegated.

Tipperary's Jimmy Doyle was the Division 1 top scorer with 8-35.

=== Group 1A table ===
Pos	Team	Pld	W	D	L	Pts	Notes
1	Tipperary	4	3	1	0	7	Division 1 champions
2	Cork	4	3	0	1	6	
3	Kilkenny	4	2	1	1	5	
4	Galway	4	1	0	3	2	
5	Clare	4	0	0	4	0	

=== Group stage ===
29 September 1963	Tipperary	9-14 - 1-04	Galway	MacDonagh Park, Nenagh
	J McKenna 3-1, S McLoughlin 3-0, D Nealon 2-1, L Devaney 1-1, Jimmy Doyle 0-4, M Keating 0-4, T Wall 0-2, M Burns 0-1.		N Derivan 1-0, M Cullinane 0-2, L Gardiner 0-1, F Coffey 0-1.	Referee: S Gleeson (Limerick)

6 October 1963	Cork	5-09 - 5-05	Clare	Cork Athletic Grounds, Cork
	J Bennett 2-7, F Mahony 1-1, R Browne 1-0, M Archer 1-0, J Young 0-1.		J Smyth 3-0, P Henchy 1-2, P McNamara 1-0, S Cleary 0-2, L Gallagher 0-1.	Referee: J Foran (Tipperary)

13 October 1963	Clare	2-08 - 5-07	Tipperary	Cusack Park, Ennis
	T Cronin 1-3, P McNamara 1-0, S Cleary 0-2, P Henchy 0-1, L Danaher 0-1, W Guinnane 0-1.		J McKenna 2-0, S McLoughlin 2-0, Jimmy Doyle 1-1, L Devaney 0-3, T English 0-2, T Ryan 0-1.	Referee: A Higgins (Galway)

13 October 1963	Galway	1-04 - 1-13	Kilkenny	Pearse Stadium, Salthill
	F Coffey 0-3, E Derivan 1-0, S Murphy 0-1.		E Keher 0-9, J Teehan 1-0, D Heaslip 0-2, W Murphy 0-1, M Dalton 0-1.	Referee: M Hayes (Clare)

10 November 1963	Tipperary	3-14 - 1-03	Cork	Thurles Sportsfield, Thurles
	Jimmy Doyle 2-5, S McLoughlin 1-0, M Keating 0-3, J McKenna 0-2, L Devaney 0-2, D Nealon 0-1, T English 0-1.		T Corbett 1-0, P Harte 0-3.	Referee: P Johnston (Kilkenny)

10 November 1963	Kilkenny	5-10 - 5-06	Clare	Nowlan Park, Kilkenny
	E Keher 2-8, P Larkin 2-0, P Forrestal 1-0, P Moran 0-1, T Walsh 0-1.		M O'Shea 2-1, J Smyth 1-3, L Danaher 1-0, N Jordan 1-0, S Cleary 0-1, P Henchy 0-1.	Referee: P Roche (Waterford)

1 March 1964	Clare	5-06 - 5-11	Galway	Cusack Park, Ennis
	P McNamara 3-0, P Henchy 1-1, M O'Shea 1-0, P Cronin 0-2, J Smyth 0-1, S Cleary 0-1, N Jordan 0-1.		F Coffey 2-3, J Maher 2-0, T Purcell 0-6, J Salmon 1-0, P Egan 0-1, P Mitchell 0-1.

1 March 1964	Cork	3-09 - 1-06	Kilkenny	Cork Athletic Grounds, Cork
	P Harte 0-7, M Archer 2-0, J O'Halloran 0-1, J O'Sullivan 0-1.		E Keher 1-3, J Teehan 0-1, P Larkin 0-1, D Heaslip 0-1.

22 March 1964	Kilkenny	3-09 - 2-12	Tipperary	Nowlan Park, Kilkenny
	T Walsh 2-0, E Keher 0-5, T Forrestal 1-1, D Heaslip 0-1, P Moran 0-1, S Cleere 0-1.		Jimmy Doyle 1-6, M Ketaing 1-1, M Burns 0-2, L Kiely 0-2, L Devaney 0-1.

22 March 1964	Galway	0-10 - 3-05	Cork	Kenny Park, Athenry
	T Purcell 0-7, PJ Lawless 0-1, G Lohan 0-1, S Murphy 0-1.		R Browne 1-2, J O'Halloran 1-1, N Gallagher 1-0, J Hayes 0-2.	Referee: J Smyth (Clare)

=== Group 1B table ===
Pos	Team	Pld	W	D	L	Pts	Notes
1	Wexford	4	4	0	0	8	
2	Limerick	3	2	0	1	6	
3	Dublin	4	2	0	2	4	
4	Waterford	4	1	0	2	2	
5	Carlow	3	0	0	3	0	

=== Group stage ===
29 September 1963	Dublin	2-10 - 5-06	Limerick	Croke Park, Dublin
	M Bermingham 2-4, B Cooney 0-2, D Foley 0-2, A McEntaggart 0-1, M Kennedy 0-1.		M Rainsford 3-1, B Hartigan 1-1, T Bluett 1-0, L Hogan 0-2, P Cobbe 0-1, E Carey 0-1.

13 October 1963	Limerick	1-09 - 1-10	Wexford	Ennis Road, Limerick
	M Rainsford 1-1, T Bluett 0-2, E Carey 0-2, PJ Keane 0-1, S Craig 0-1, D Flynn 0-1.		O McGrath 1-1, P Lynch 0-4, J Kennedy 0-1, J O'Brien 0-1, W Foley 0-1, A Quirke 0-1, J Foley 0-1.

20 October 1963	Carlow	1-10 - 2-10	Dublin	Dr. Cullen Park, Carlow
	P Freeney 0-8, P Brophy 1-0, D Hickey 0-1, P O'Connell 0-1.		F Whelan 1-3, J Shields 1-1, B Cooney 0-2, M Bermingham 0-2, W Jackson 0-1, A Boothman 0-1.

10 November 1963	Dublin	3-10 - 1-11	Waterford	Croke Park, Dublin
	M Bermingham 2-1, W Jackson 1-2, J Shields 0-3, C Leaney 0-3, A Boothman 0-1.		S Power 1-2, P Grimes 0-4, J Barron 0-2, L Guinan 0-1, J O'Byrne 0-1, V O'Connor 0-1.

2 February 1964	Wexford	5-10 - 0-06	Carlow	O'Kennedy Park, New Ross
	N O'Donnell 3-1, O McGrath 2-2, J Foley 0-3, P Lynch 0-2, J O'Brien 0-1, D Kennedy 0-1.		W Hogan 0-2, L Welsh 0-2, T Freeney 0-1, M O'Brien 0-1.

23 February 1964	Waterford	6-08 - 1-05	Carlow	Walsh Park, Waterford
	S Power 3-0, J O'Brien 2-3, V Connors 1-0, J Barron 0-2, P Grimes 0-2, M Flannelly 0-1.		J Darmody 1-0, P O'Connell 0-2, P McGovern 0-2, J McCarthy 0-1.	Referee: J Maddock (Wexford)

1 March 1964	Waterford	2-05 - 2-13	Wexford	Walsh Park, Waterford
	P Grimes 0-3, F Walsh 1-1, J Byrne 1-0, J Barron 0-1.		P Lynch 0-7, N O'Donnell 2-0, J O'Brien 0-3, P Wilson 0-2, O McGrath 0-1.	Referee: T Foran (Tipperary)

22 March 1964	Wexford	2-10 - 1-05	Dublin	Páirc Uí Shíocháin, Gorey
	O McGrath 1-2, J Foley 1-1, P Lynch 0-4, J O'Brien 0-2, B Rackard 0-1.		F Whelan 1-1, B Cooney 0-1, A Boothman 0-1, E Flynn 0-1, D Foley 0-1.	Referee: P Johnston (Kilkenny)

22 March 1964	Limerick	3-08 - 1-12	Waterford	Ennis Road, Limerick
	D Flynn 2-0, T Bluett 1-0, L Hogan 0-2, M Savage 0-2, K Long 0-2, J BLake 0-1, B Hartigan 0-1.		P Grimes 0-4, F Walsh 1-0, J O'Brien 0-3, J Byrne 0-2, J Phelan 0-1, M Flannelly 0-1, S Power 0-1.

=== Knock-out stage ===
Semi-finals

19 April 1964 Semi-Final	Tipperary	3-16 – 2-5	Limerick	MacDonagh Park, Nenagh
	Jimmy Doyle 1-8, S McLoughlin 1-1, L Devaney 1-0, D Nealon 0-3, T English 0-1, M Roche 0-1, L Kiely 0-1, J McKenna 0-1.		M Rainsford 1-2, J Blake 1-0, K Long 0-1, P Cobbe 0-1, E Carey 0-1.	Referee: A Higgins (Galway)

26 April 1964 Semi-Final	Wexford	2-9 – 2-7	Cork	Croke Park, Dublin
	J O'Brien 1-1, P Kehoe 1-0, D Shannon 0-2, P Lynch 0-2, O McGrath 0-2, R Murphy 0-1, P Wilson 0-1.		P Harte 1-6, J Bennett 1-1.	Referee: S Power (Waterford)

Home final

10 May 1964 Home Final	Tipperary	5-12 – 1-4	Wexford	Croke Park, Dublin
	Jimmy Doyle 1-4, M Keating 1-3, J McKenna 1-1, S McLoughlin 1-1, D Nealon 1-0, M Burns 0-1, L Kiely 0-1, T English 0-1.		P Lynch 1-1, D Shannon 0-1, N Wheeler 0-1, P Wilson 0-1.	Referee: A Higgins (Galway)

Final

31 May 1964 Final	Tipperary	4-16 – 6-6	New York	Gaelic Park, New York City
	Jimmy Doyle 2-7, Kiely 1-4, M Maher 1-0, M Keating, D Nealon, T English, T Ryan, M Roche 0-1 each	Report	J Carey, P Kelleher, Donohoe 2-0 each, Ryall 0-5, J Keating 0-1.	Attendance: 8,000; Referee: G Fitzgerald (Limerick)

=== Top scorers ===
Rank	Player	Club	Tally	Total
1	Jimmy Doyle	Tipperary	8-35	59
2	Eddie Keher	Kilkenny	3-25	34
3	Seán McLoughlin	Tipperary	8-02	26
4	John McKenna	Tipperary	6-05	23
4	Paul Lynch	Wexford	1-20	23
5	Martin Rainsford	Limerick	5-04	19
5	Mick Bermingham	Dublin	4-07	19
5	Patsy Harte	Cork	1-16	19
6	Oliver McGrath	Wexford	4-06	18
7	John Bennett	Cork	3-08	17

Top scorers in a single game

Rank	Player	Club	Tally	Total	Opposition
1	Eddie Keher	Kilkenny	2-08	14	Clare
2	John Bennett	Cork	2-07	13	Clare
2	Jimmy Doyle	Tipperary	2-07	13	New York
3	Jimmy Doyle	Tipperary	2-05	11	Cork
3	Jimmy Doyle	Tipperary	1-08	11	Limerick
4	John McKenna	Tipperary	3-01	10	Galway
4	Martin Rainsford	Limerick	3-01	10	Dublin
4	Nick O'Donnell	Wexford	3-01	10	Carlow
4	Mick Bermingham	Dublin	2-04	10	Limerick
5	Seán McLoughlin	Tipperary	3-00	9	Galway
5	Jimmy Smyth	Clare	3-00	9	Cork
5	Pat McNamara	Clare	3-00	9	Galway
5	Séamus Power	Waterford	3-00	9	Carlow
5	Frank Coffey	Galway	2-03	9	Clare
5	John O'Brien	Waterford	2-03	9	Carlow
5	Jimmy Doyle	Tipperary	1-06	9	Kilkenny
5	Patsy Harte	Cork	1-06	9	Wexford
5	Eddie Keher	Kilkenny	0-09	9	Galway

== Division 2 ==
National Hurling League Division 2
- Season: 1963-64
- Champions: Westmeath
- All statistics correct as of 4 March 2017.

On 3 May 1964, Westmeath won the title after a 3-9 to 3-7 win over Laois in the final.

In spite of finishing at the bottom of their respective groups, neither Down or Wicklow were relegated.

=== Group 2C table ===
Pos	Team	Pld	W	D	L	Pts	Notes
1	Westmeath	4	4	0	0	8	Division 2 champions
2	Antrim	4	3	0	1	6	
3	Meath	4	2	0	2	4	
4	Roscommon	4	1	0	3	2	
5	Down	4	0	0	4	0	

=== Group 2D table ===
Pos	Team	Pld	W	D	L	Pts	Notes
1	Laois	4	4	0	0	8	
2	Offaly	4	3	0	1	6	
3	Kerry	4	1	1	2	3	
4	Kildare	4	1	0	3	2	
5	Wicklow	4	0	1	3	1	

=== Knock-out stage ===
Semi-finals

5 April 1964 Semi-final	Laois	1-9 - 1-5	Antrim	Croke Park, Dublin
	P Bates 0-6, C O'Brien 1-0, S Cashin 0-3.		B McGarvey 1-0, P Mullaney 0-2, D Armstrong 0-2, D McNeill 0-1.

12 April 1964 Semi-final	Westmeath	2-12 - 4-4	Offaly	Croke Park, Dublin
	T Ring 0-7, M Flanagan 1-3, S Kiernan 1-0, C Connaughton 0-1, S Rooney 0-1.		B Loughnane 2-1, JJ Healion 1-1, T Errity 1-0, P Molloy 0-1, B Johnston 0-1.

Final

3 May 1964 Final	Westmeath	3-9 - 3-7	Laois	Croke Park, Dublin
	P Fagan 2-1, T Ring 0-4, J Rooney 1-0, J McGrath 0-3, P McCabe 0-1.		J Conroy 2-0, P Delaney 1-0, P Bates 0-3, J Fitzpatrick 0-1, J Lyons 0-1, T Drennan 0-1, J Lyons 0-1.
