= Richard Bagwell =

Irish historian

Richard Bagwell (9 December 1840 – 4 December 1918) was a historian of the Stuart and Tudor periods in Ireland, and a political commentator with strong Unionist convictions.

Book Cover

He was the eldest son of John Bagwell, M.P. for Clonmel from 1857 to 1874. His son John Philip Bagwell followed the family tradition in politics becoming a Senator in the government of the Irish Free State in 1923.

== Academic career ==
Bagwell was educated at Harrow and Oxford in England and called to the Bar, being admitted to Inner Temple in 1866. He was the author of Ireland Under the Tudors, 3 vols. (1885–1890) and Ireland Under the Stuarts, 3 vols. (1909–10), in recognition for which he was given the honorary degree of Litt. D. by Dublin University in 1913 and that of D.Litt. by Oxford University in 1917. He also wrote the historical entry on ‘Ireland’ for the Encyclopædia Britannica (Chicago 1911).

== Politics ==
Bagwell was a Commissioner on National Education between 1905 and 1918 and a member of the Patriotic Union (Southern Unionists). He held the position of High Sheriff of County Tipperary in 1869. He was a Justice of the Peace for County Tipperary (and later for Waterford), and held the office of Deputy Lieutenant of Tipperary. He was also Special Local Government Commissioner between 1898 and 1903 and President of the Borstal Association of Ireland.

== Personal life ==
Bagwell married Harriet Philippa Joscelyn (née Newton) on 9 January 1873. The couple had one son, John Philip Bagwell, and three daughters, Emily Georgiana, Margaret and Lilla Minnie. He died 4 December 1918 at Marlfield.

== Works ==
=== Ireland under the Tudors ===
- Bagwell, Richard (1885). Ireland under the Tudors. Vol. 1. London: Longmans, Green, and Co. OCLC 761857292. – 1534 to 1558
- Bagwell, Richard (1885). Ireland under the Tudors. Vol. 2. London: Longmans, Green, and Co. OCLC 761857292. – 1558 to 1578
- Bagwell, Richard (1890). Ireland under the Tudors. Vol. 3. London: Longmans, Green, and Co. OCLC 761857292. – 1579 to 1603

=== Ireland under the Stuarts ===
- Bagwell, Richard (1909). Ireland under the Stuarts and under the Interregnum. Vol. 1. London: Longmans, Green, and Co. OCLC 458582656. – 1603 to 1642
- Bagwell, Richard (1909). Ireland under the Stuarts and under the Interregnum. Vol. 2. London: Longmans, Green, and Co. OCLC 458582656. – 1642 to 1660
- Bagwell, Richard (1916). Ireland under the Stuarts and under the Interregnum. Vol. 3. London: Longmans, Green, and Co. OCLC 458582656. – 1660 to 1690

=== Contributions to the Dictionary of National Biography ===
Bagwell was a prolific contributor to the DNB. Among many others he wrote:

- Bagwell, Richard (1895). "O'Brien, Murrough, first Earl of Inchiquin (1614–1674)". In Lee, Sidney (ed.). Dictionary of National Biography. Vol. 41. New York: MacMillan and Co. pp. 320–327. OCLC 8544105.
- Bagwell, Richard (1896). "Philips or Phillips, George (1599?–1696)". In Lee, Sidney (ed.). Dictionary of National Biography. Vol. 45. London: Smith, Elder & Co. pp. 174–175. OCLC 8544105.
- Bagwell, Richard (1898). "Talbot, Richard, Earl and titular Duke of Tyrconnel (1630–1691)". In Lee, Sidney (ed.). Dictionary of National Biography. Vol. 55. London: Smith, Elder, & Co. pp. 331–336. OCLC 8544105.

=== Contributions to the Encyclopaedia Britannica 11th Edition ===
Bagwell contributed one signed article:

- Chisholm, Hugh, ed. (1910). "Ireland" . Encyclopædia Britannica. Vol. 14 (11th ed.). Cambridge University Press. pp. 742–789.

== Bibliography ==
Dudley Edwards, Ruth W.; O'Dowd, Mary (2003), Sources for Modern Irish History 1534-1641, Cambridge University Press, ISBN 978-0-521-27141-7

== See also ==
- Clonmel Borstal
- Marlfield, Clonmel
