= Marlfield House, Clonmel =

Marlfield House
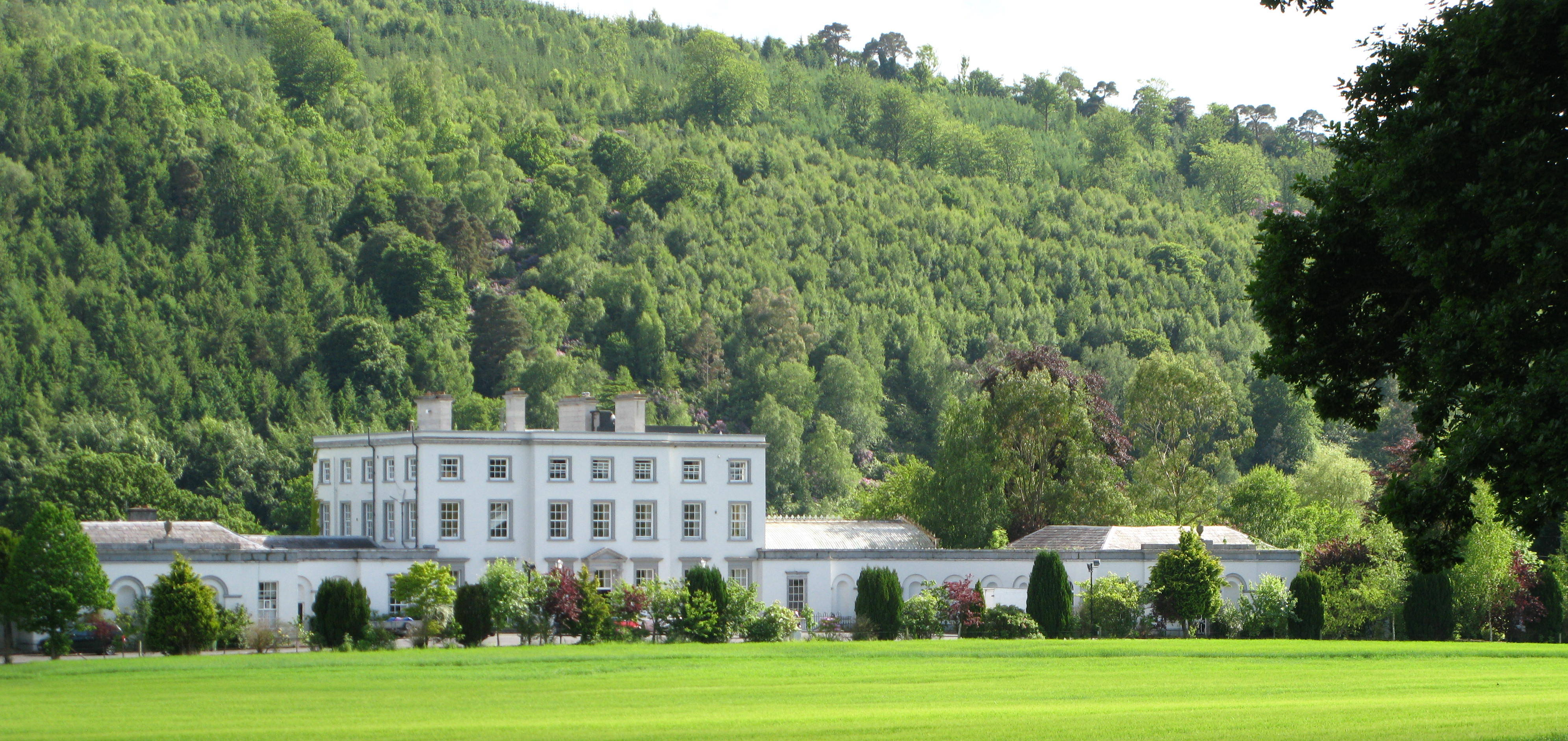
- North façade, 2010.

- Location within Ireland
- 52°20′35″N 7°45′40″W
- Location: 0.5 miles (1 km) west of Marlfield, Clonmel, County Tipperary, Ireland

History
- Built: 1785

Site notes
- Architect: William Tinsley

Marlfield House was the former residence of the Bagwells, a wealthy and politically influential Irish Unionist family in south Tipperary from the eighteenth to the twentieth centuries.

It is located about three kilometres west of the town of Clonmel on the northern bank of the River Suir. It was built by John Bagwell in 1785. The main entrance gate, considered of exceptional quality, was designed by the local architect William Tinsley and the conservatory by Richard Turner. In January 1923, the main house was badly damaged in an arson attack by anti-Treaty IRA forces during the Irish Civil War. The fire destroyed the library and historical papers of historian Richard Bagwell. It was targeted because of Bagwell's son John Philip Bagwell was a Senator in the new Irish Free State.

Following that conflict it was rebuilt and remained in Bagwell hands until the 1970s when it and the surrounding park and estate lands were sold. The first and second floors have since been converted into twelve apartments.

== Notable occupants ==
- John Bagwell (1751–1816). Representative for Tipperary in the Irish House of Commons.
- William Bagwell (1776–1826). MP for Clonmel at the House of Commons.
- John Bagwell (1811–1883). Nephew of William. MP for Clonmel between 1857 and 1874.
- Richard Bagwell (1840–1918). Noted historian of the Stuart and Tudor periods in Ireland,
- John Philip Bagwell (1874–1946). Railway executive and Irish Free State Senator.
