= Lilla Minnie Perry =

Irish landscape painter

- Born: Lilla Minnie Bagwell; 10 June 1888; Marlfield House, Clonmel, County Tipperary
- Died: 30 August 1974 (aged 86); Marlfield House, Clonmel, County Tipperary

Lilla Minnie Perry (10 June 1888 – 30 August 1974) was an Irish landscape painter.

== Early life and family ==
Lilla Minnie Perry was born Lilla Minnie Bagwell on 10 June 1888 at Marlfield House, Clonmel, County Tipperary. She was the youngest child of Richard and Harriet Bagwell (née Newton). She was raised at Marlfield House, living there until she married a captain in the merchant navy, John Perry (1875–1965) on 4 October 1915. They went on to have three sons and one daughter, Mary Lilla. They lived at the Perry estate, Newcastle, County Tipperary until it was burnt by republicans in June 1921. After this they lived at a property neighbouring Marlfield, Birdhill. Perry died at Marlfield on 30 August 1974.

== Artistic career ==
It has been assumed that Perry received some amount of formal art training, and she spent a few months in Italy as a young woman, but largely she appears to have been self-taught. She worked almost exclusively in watercolours, and exhibited regularly with the Water Colour Society of Ireland (WCSI) from 1908 to 1970. She showed over 100 works with the WCSI, initially as Lilla Bagwell, and later under her married name. In 1909 she exhibited with the London Salon for the first time, and was included in exhibitions at the Society of Women Artists, London in 1911/1912. She painted all her life, put her most prolific period was in the 1920s and 1930s. From 1927 to 1930, Perry exhibited five works at the Royal Hibernian Academy. She also showed with the Munster Fine Art Club in 1933 and the Ulster Academy of Arts, Belfast in 1937.

Her subjects were consistently gardens, trees and rivers, mostly scenes from her home at Birdhill, but also from around Clonmel. Over time her style developed, from muted colours and attention to close detail in her early work, to looser brushwork and a brighter palette. Her Kilmanahan castle near Clonmel was included at the centenary exhibition of the WCSI in 1970. The majority of her work is held in private collections, with the South Tipperary County Museum, Clonmel holding Knocklofty bridge (1940) and Clonmel and the River Suir (1931).
