= Ó Meachair =

Ó Meachair or O'Meachair (anglicised as Mahar, Maher, Mahir, Marr, Meagar, Meagher, Meaher, O'Maher and O'Meagher) is a Gaelic Irish surname. Ó Meachair literally means grandson/descendant of ('O' prefix) the kind, generous or hospitable (Meachair). By the Irish name convention, this becomes "descendant of a kind, hospitable chief (clan leader)". The Ó Meachair sept was part of the Ely O'Carroll clan and was concentrated in the areas of Kilkenny and Tipperary, notably the Barony of Ikerrin in Ireland.

According to historian C. Thomas Cairney, the O'Mahers were one of the chiefly families of the Éile tribe who in turn came from the Dumnonii or Laigin who were the third wave of Celts to settle in Ireland during the first century BC.

== Naming conventions ==
Male	Daughter	Wife (Long)	Wife (Short)
Ó Meachair	Ní Mheachair	Bean Uí Mheachair	Uí Mheachair

== People ==
=== Mahar ===
- Alan Mahar (born 1949), English author and publisher
- Andres Mähar (born 1978), Estonian actor
- Andrew Mahar, Canadian judge
- Buddy Mahar (born 1945), American basketball coach
- Frank Mahar (1878–1961), American baseball player
- Hendrik Isam Mahar (1928–1990), Indonesian Army officer
- Kevin Mahar (born 1981), American baseball player
- William F. Mahar Sr. (1919–2006), American politician
- William F. Mahar Jr. (born 1947), American politician, son of the above

=== Marr ===
- Johnny Marr (born 1963), né John Martin Maher, musician from Manchester in England

=== Meagher ===
- Aileen Meagher (1910–1987), Canadian athlete
- Danny Meagher (born 1962), Canadian basketball player
- Edward Meagher (1908–1988), Australian politician
- Frank Meagher (born 1897–?), Irish name Prionsias Ó Meachair, Irish hurler
- Henry Meagher (1902–1982), Irish name Pádraig Ó Meachair, Irish hurler
- Jack Meagher (1896–1968), American football coach
- Jill Meagher (1982–2012), murder victim in Melbourne, Australia
- Jim Meagher, founder of Meagher Electronics
- John Meagher, several people, including:
  - John Meagher (born 1947), Irish architect, partner in De Blacam & Meagher
  - John Meagher (Canada East politician) (c. 1805–1876), Irish-born merchant and politician in Canada East
  - John F. Meagher (born 1948), Australian thoroughbred racehorse trainer
  - John W. Meagher (1917–1996), American soldier, Medal of Honor recipient
- Karen Meagher, English actress
- Lory Meagher (1899–1973), Irish hurler
- Margaret Meagher (1911–1999), Canadian diplomat
- Mary T. Meagher (born 1964), American swimmer
- Matthew Meagher (born 1998), American YouTuber known as MMG
- Patrick Meagher (hurler) "Wedger" (1890-1958), Irish name Pádraig Ó Meachair, Irish hurler
- Ray Meagher (born 1944), Australian actor
- Reba Meagher (born 1967), Australian politician
- Rick Meagher (born 1953), Canadian ice hockey player
- Roddy Meagher (1932–2011), Australian jurist and judge
- Sylvia Meagher, American author
- Thomas Meagher, several people, including:
  - Thomas Meagher (merchant) (c. 1764–1837) Irish emigrant to Newfoundland, merchant and ship-owner
  - Thomas Meagher (MP) (1796–1874), Irish businessman and politician, mayor of Waterford and MP for Waterford, 1847–57
  - Thomas Francis Meagher (1823–1867), leader of the Young Irelander Rebellion of 1848, Union general, acting Governor of the Montana Territory
  - Thomas William Meagher (1902–1979), Australian medical practitioner, Lord Mayor of Perth, Western Australia
- William Meagher (Irish politician) (died 1897), Irish businessman and politician
- William R. Meagher (1903–1981), American lawyer
- Willie Meagher (1895–1957), Irish name Liam Ó Meachair, Irish hurler

== Other ==
- Fr Meachair Cup, an Irish inter-collegiate camogie tournament

== See also ==
- Maher (Arabic name)
- Mahir
- Maher (god)
- Irish clans

== Bibliography ==
- Ní Mheachair, Gabrielle, Ó Meachair: The Story of a Clan, Ui Cairin Press (2014)
