= Cork–Kilkenny hurling rivalry =

Irish sports rivalry

Cork-Kilkenny
- Location: County Cork; County Kilkenny
- Teams: Cork; Kilkenny
- First meeting: Cork 6-8 - 0-2 Kilkenny; 1893 All-Ireland final (24 June 1894)
- Latest meeting: Cork 3-12 - 1-15 Kilkenny; Division 1 Group A (1 March 2026)
- Next meeting: TBA

Statistics
- Total meetings: 29
- Most wins: Kilkenny
- Most player appearances: Henry Shefflin (7)
- Top scorer: Henry Shefflin (0-37)
- All-time series: Championship: Kilkenny 16-11 Cork (2 draws); NHL: Kilkenny 41-37 Cork (5 draws)
- Largest victory: Cork 6-8 - 0-2 Kilkenny; 1893 All-Ireland final (24 June 1894)

The Cork-Kilkenny rivalry is a hurling rivalry between Irish county teams Cork and Kilkenny, who first played each other in 1894. It is considered to be one of the biggest rivalries in Gaelic games. Kilkenny's home ground is Nowlan Park and Cork's home ground is Páirc Uí Chaoimh, however, all of their championship meetings have been held at neutral venues, usually Croke Park.

While Cork have the highest number of Munster titles and Kilkenny are the standard bearers in Leinster, they are also two of the most successful teams in the All-Ireland Senior Hurling Championship, having won 66 championship titles between them to date.

As of 2021 the sides have met 29 times in the hurling championship including meeting 24 times at the All Ireland final stage, more than any other All Ireland hurling final fixture, (Kilkenny have won 13 of these finals compared to Cork’s 9 final wins with 2 draw’s).

Regarded as two of hurling's "big three", with Tipperary making up the trio, an All-Ireland final between Cork and Kilkenny is regarded as a special occasion.

== History ==
=== 1893: Beginnings ===
An inauspicious start to one of the greatest rivalries on 24 June 1894. Cork won on probably the most unsuitable playing surface in hurling history after somebody neglected to get the grass cut at the original venue in Ashtown. The goalposts were uprooted and spectators and players alike moved to the Phoenix Park after a long delay. Cork, represented by Blackrock, gave an exhibition of hurling and led by 3-4 to 0-1 at the interval. Each side made exactly the same return in the second half to give Cork the victory.

=== 1903-1912: Kilkenny's first great era ===
On 16 July 1905, Cork played Kilkenny in the delayed 1903 All-Ireland home final. The Cats were completely overwhelmed as Cork powered to an 8-9 to 0-8 victory.

The delayed 1904 All-Ireland final, played on 24 June 1906, pitted three-in-a-row hopefuls Cork against Kilkenny. After losing four previous finals Kilkenny finally triumphed. Dick Doyle's first-half goal set the Cats on their way, while a last-minute miracle save by 'keeper Pat "Fox" Maher secured a narrow 1-9 to 1-8 victory.

Cork's 5-10 to 3-13 defeat of Kilkenny in the delayed 1905 All-Ireland final, played on 14 April 1907, was declared null and void as Cork goalkeeper Daniel McCarthy was a British Army reservist, while Kilkenny's Matt Gargan had played with Waterford in earlier rounds of the championship. The replay on 30 June 1907 saw Kilkenny's Jimmy Kelly score a record-equalling 5-2. Kilkenny scored their seven goals in a thirty-minute spell. A puck-out by Cork goalkeeper Jamesy Kelleher is said to have bounced and hopped over the Kilkenny crossbar for a point. Kilkenny powered to a 7-7 to 2-9 victory.

The delayed All-Ireland final on 21 June 1908 saw Cork face Kilkenny at Fraher Field. Jimmy Kelly got the first of his hat-trick of goals within seconds of the start. The game looked to be heading for a replay when Jack Anthony scored the winning point. The Cats survived two Cork goal hunts in the dying minutes and claimed a narrow 3-12 to 4-8 victory.

Gate receipts were a record £589 at Croke Park for the All-Ireland meeting of Cork and Kilkenny on 17 November 1912. Kilkenny's ability to score goals proved decisive as they recorded another one-point defeat of Cork. Sim Walton pulled on a long, dropping ball from Jimmy Kelly for Kilkenny's first goal. A long Matt Gargan ball dropped past the Cork 'keeper and stopped just an inch over the line for their second. A 2-1 to 1-3 score line gave Kilkenny their sixth All-Ireland title in nine years.

=== 1926: A lone meeting after a fourteen-year absence ===
On 24 October 1926 Cork and Kilkenny did battle on a snow-covered Croke Park. Three Meagher brothers - Lory, Willie and Henry - bolstered the Kilkenny team. Paddy "Balty" Ahern led the Cork attack as the Rebels had the narrowest of leads at the interval. Kilkenny slumped in the second half, going down to a 4-6 to 2-0 defeat. It was the first of thirteen All-Ireland victories for legendary Cork trained Jim "Tough" Barry.

=== 1931: Three All-Ireland finals ===
On 6 September 1931 Cork and Kilkenny faced each other in the All-Ireland decider. The first half was closely contested, with a goal from Mick Ahern helping Cork to a half-time lead of 1-3 to 0-2. Cork stretched the advantage to six points in the second half, but Kilkenny came storming back with a goal and then four points on the trot to take the lead by one point. In the dying moments Cork captain Eudie Coughlan got possession and made his way towards the goal. As he did so he slipped and fell but struck the sliotar while he was down on his knees, and it went over the bar to level the scores at 1-6 apiece and force a replay.

The replay took place a month later on 11 October 1931 and is regarded as a classic for its swinging fortunes. Cork once again had a four-point lead at the interval, however, Kilkenny again fought back in the second half. Lory Meagher sent over a 90-yard free to level the game at 2-5 apiece and again force a replay. After the game officials pressed for extra time, however, Cork captain Coughlan rejected this as a younger Kilkenny team would have the upper hand on an aging Cork team. It was also suggested at a meeting of the Central Council that both counties be declared joint champions and that half an All-Ireland medal by given to each player. This motion was later defeated.

Once again Cork and Kilkenny assembled at Croke Park on 1 November 1931 for the third installment of the All-Ireland final. Kilkenny captain Lory Meagher was ruled out of the game because of broken ribs sustained in the first replay and watched the game wearing his overcoat on the sideline. Such was the esteem in which he was held the game was virtually conceded to Cork since the star captain couldn't play. In spite of fielding a younger team, Kilkenny were defeated by Cork on a score line of 5-8 to 3-4. It was the first occasion when the GAA realised the lucrative nature of replays. Central Council reported earnings of £8000 from the gate at the three games.

=== 1939-1947: Two iconic All-Ireland meetings ===
On the same day that England and France declared war on Germany, the All-Ireland final between Cork and Kilkenny entered the realms of folklore as the famous "thunder and lightning final", so called because the climax of the game was played in a fierce thunderstorm. A then record crowd of 39,000 for a Cork-Kilkenny game saw both sides remain level for much of the game. Kilkenny pulled forward by three points at one stage, however, Willie Campbell landed a long-range free in the net for a dramatic equalising goal for Cork. While it looked as if the game was heading for a replay Kilkenny's Terry Leahy whipped over the winning point after he connected with a Paddy Phelan 70-yards free. With that the long whistle sounded and Kilkenny were the champions by 2-7 to 3-3.

After a seven-year absence, Cork and Kilkenny renewed their rivalry in the All-Ireland decider on 1 September 1946. Cork were aiming for a fifth All-Ireland title within six years, while Kilkenny were All-Ireland runners-up to Tipperary the previous year. While some had written off Cork's chances, they took an interval lead of four points. With ten minutes remaining Cork's lead was reduced to just two points, however, goals by Mossy O'Riordan and Joe Kelly secured the 7-6 to 3-8 victory.

Regarded by many oldtimers as the greatest All-Ireland final of them all, there was much at stake when Cork and Kilkenny met each other on 7 September 1947. After losing back-to-back championship deciders in 1945 and 1946, Kilkenny faced the unpalatable prospect of becoming the first team in championship history to lose three-in-a-row. Cork, on the other hand, were hoping to capture an unprecedented sixth All-Ireland title in seven years. Like many of their previous contests there was little to separate these two sides. Kilkenny took a narrow 0-7 to 0-5 lead at the interval, however, the game was far from over. Mossy O'Riordan and Joe Kelly got Cork back into the game with two second-half goals, however, Kilkenny's Jim Langton and Terry Leahy were the key players with tallies of 0-3 and 0-6 respectively. As the game headed towards a replay it was Leahy who chipped over the winning point. It was the first time since 1893 that Kilkenny failed to score a goal against Cork.

=== 1966-1972: Renewed rivalry ===
After an absence of nineteen years, Cork and Kilkenny faced each other in the All-Ireland final on 4 September 1966. Cork, seeking a first title in twelve years, laid the foundations for this victory with a solid first-half performance as having played into the win they trailed by 0-7 to 1-2. Not long after the restart Cork went ahead with Colm Sheehan scoring a hat-trick of goals. A 3-9 to 1-10 gave Cork the title in front of a then record of 68,249 spectators.

The respective All-Ireland champions of 1966 and 1967 faced each other in the last sixty-minute All-Ireland final on 7 September 1969. Cork had the better of the opening half and had a three-point lead at the break. The third quarter saw Kilkenny with the edge and on two occasions the sides could not be separated. Cork faded completely in the final quarter allowing Kilkenny to ease to a 2-15 to 2-9 victory.

Regarded as one of the classic games of the modern era, the All-Ireland final on 3 September 1972 was the only eighty-minute championship decider between Cork and Kilkenny. In a game that produced a plethora of scores, Cork's ability to find the net gave them a 2-8 to 0-12 lead at the interval. Halfway through the second-half Cork were on form and stretched their lead to eight points. Drastic action was required for Kilkenny and Eddie Keher was deployed closer to the Cork goal. One of the most abiding memories of that game is of Keher grabbing the sliotar out of the sky and racing up the wing in the shadow of the Hogan Stand. From that sideline position Keher pucked the sliotar as if going for a point, however, the sliotar dropped short, deceiving Cork goalkeeper Paddy Barry, and ending up in the back of the net. After scoring that goal an almost emotionless Keher simply turned around to go back to his normal playing position with blood pouring out of a cut over his eye. Keher finished the game with a tally of 2-9 as Kilkenny scored seven points without reply to capture a memorable 3-24 to 5-11 victory.

=== 1978-1983: Kilkenny double after Cork treble ===
Not the greatest of games between these two sides, however, it was notable as Cork attempted to capture a third All-Ireland title in-a-row on 3 September 1978. The game ebbed and flowed for much of the seventy minutes with no side breaking away. The sides were level eight times. With thirteen minutes left, Jimmy Barry-Murphy hit a low shot in towards the goal and it bobbled in past goalkeeper Noel Skehan. A 1-15 to 2-8 gave Cork their first championship three-in-a-row since 1954.

Kilkenny were rank outsiders going into the All-Ireland final on 5 September 1982 as the attendance dropped below 60,000 for the first time since before World War II. The opening eighteen minutes were frantic, however, a Noel Skehan save from a Seánie O'Leary shot inspired Kilkenny. A brace of goals from Christy Heffernan in two minutes just before the break gave Kilkenny a 2-11 to 0-7 lead. Cork rallied after the restart, however, Skehan was the hero for Kilkenny as they powered to a 3-18 to 1-13 victory.

The first period of the All-Ireland final on 4 September 1983 was similar to the previous year as Kilkenny built up an interval advantage of six points. Shortly after the restart, Kilkenny's advantage was nine points, however, they failed to score for the last seventeen minutes of the game. Cork rallied and narrowed the deficit to two points before running out of time. Billy Fitzpatrick scored 0-10 for Kilkenny, while Noel Skehan won a ninth All-Ireland medal, a full twenty years after he won his first as a substitute.

=== 1992: A lone meeting ===
The Cats were the favourites going into the All-Ireland final on 6 September 1992 as they sought their first championship in nine years. Cork, however, had earlier dethroned reigning champions Tipperary and were aiming for a second All-Ireland crown in two years. The final was going to script in the first half as Cork shot five points without reply before D. J. Carey rattled home a penalty before half-time to leave them just two adrift at the beginning of the second period. Christy Heffernan entered the fray in the second half and inspired Kilkenny to up their performance. John Power kicked a goal and Cork, despite a Ger Manley goal, were unable to get back on terms as Kilkenny ran out winners on a 3-10 to 1-12 scoreline.

=== 1999-2006: Cork and Kilkenny dominate ===
As the century drew to a close so to did the hurling revolution of the nineties. The old order restored their grip on the Liam MacCarthy Cup with Cork and Kilkenny squaring off against each other in the All-Ireland final on 12 September 1999. In a dour contest played on a wet day, Cork trailed by 0-5 to 0-4 after a low-scoring first half. Kilkenny increased the pace after the interval, pulling into a four-point lead but Cork always kept in touch in a game in which both defences were on top. Kilkenny were 0-11 to 0-08 ahead and suddenly Cork moved up a gear and through Joe Deane, Ben O'Connor and Seánie McGrath Cork scored five unanswered points. Kilkenny could only manage one more score – a point from a Henry Shefflin free – and Cork held out to win by 0-13 to 0-12, their first defeat of Kilkenny since 1978.

After a four-year hiatus, Cork and Kilkenny lined out against each other in the All-Ireland decider on 14 September 2003. The conclusion at the end was that Cork, who had endured a winter of discontent on Leeside culminating in a players' strike, had left the All-Ireland title behind them. Kilkenny sparkled in the first half when the Munster champions were haunted by some terrible finishing and stuttered in the face of an admirable recovery that was given huge impetus by Setanta Ó hAilpín's 53rd-minute goal. But Kilkenny had the character and the strength in defence to survive and then triumph through Martin Comerford's goal five minutes from the end of normal time.

On 12 September 2004, Cork and Kilkenny renewed their All-Ireland rivalry for a second year in-a-row. Kilkenny, as reigning champions, were attempting to claim a third successive All-Ireland championship, while Cork were out to gain revenge for defeat the previous year. The game was an unassuming one, played on a dull, overcast day. The sides were level for much of the game, however, in the final twenty minutes Cork scored nine points without reply and secured a 0-17 to 0-9 victory.

For the third time in four years, Cork faced Kilkenny in the All-Ireland decider on 3 September 2006. Cork were aiming to become the first team since 1978 to win a third successive All-Ireland championship. Revenge was foremost in the minds of Kilkenny as it was Cork who denied their own chance at three-in-a-row in 2004. In a bruising encounter, the teams were level five times before Diarmuid O'Sullivan dropped a high ball into Aidan Fogarty's path in the 29th minute and he rocketed a shot to the Cork net. Kilkenny led 1-8 to 0-8 at the break and while Ben O'Connor's 67th-minute goal, set up by the bulldozing Niall McCarthy, jangled nerves, Kilkenny held on for a 1-16 to 1-13 victory.

=== 2008-2013: Kilkenny's dominant as Cork decline ===
By 2008, Cork's great team of the earlier part of the decade was in decline while Kilkenny were enjoying the most remarkable run of success in the history of the championship. On 10 August that year both sides faced each other in an All-Ireland semi-final. The Leesiders gave it their best shot early on and the sides were level six times in the opening twenty one minutes. But when Eoin Larkin found himself in space for a Kilkenny goal after twenty nine minutes to have his side 1-9 to 0-6 in front, the champions were in control for the remainder. The nearest Cork came to closing the gap in the second half was to make it a five-point margin. Kilkenny claimed a 1-23 to 0-17 victory as Cork's stalwart full-back, Diarmuid O'Sullivan, made an emotional exit from inter-county hurling.

With the four-in-a-row taken care of, Kilkenny set their sights on an unprecedented fifth successive championship in 2010. On 8 August Cork faced Kilkenny in the All-Ireland semi-final. The Cats controlled the game with a masterful performance, killing off the Cork challenge with goals from Eddie Brennan and Aidan Fogarty on their way to a 13-point interval lead. Cork did stage a revival in the second half with a string of well-taken scores from Patrick Horgan and Ben O'Connor, but the Cats grabbed a third goal from Richie Power to secure a 3-22 to 0-19 victory.

On 28 July 2013, Cork faced Kilkenny at Semple Stadium in the first ever meeting of the two sides at the All-Ireland quarter-final stage, Kilkenny entered the game clinging onto their hopes of a securing a tenth All-Ireland championship following narrow wins over Tipperary and Waterford. Kilkenny were boosted with the inclusion of Henry Shefflin and Michael Fennelly in their starting line-up, after the duo bounced back from a period on the sidelines due to injury. Patrick Horgan, who had his red card from the Munster final rescinded, returned to boost Cork's chances. Cork led for most of the game, while Kilkenny were dealt a major blow with a second yellow card for Shefflin late in the first half, as Cork claimed an 0-11 to 0-06 interval lead. Kilkenny battled hard on the restart, but Cork kept ahead with goalkeeper Anthony Nash inspirational in Cork's first victory over Kilkenny since 2004.

=== 2019: All-Ireland Quarter-final ===
Despite being heavy favourite for a successive championship win over Kilkenny, Cork blew a two point half-time lead and were outclassed by a resurgent Kilkenny by a scoreline of 1-16 to 0-08 in the second half. Despite an heroic 3-10 individual tally scored by Pa Horgan, Cork were dumped out of the Championship to end the 2010s without an All-Ireland title; the first decade since the 1880s in which Cork failed to win at least one title.

== Statistics ==
Up to date as of 2023 season

Team	All-Ireland	Provincial	National League	Total
Kilkenny	36	75	19	130
Cork	30	54	14	98
Combined	66	129	33	228

== All time results ==
=== Legend ===
Cork win
Kilkenny win
Drawn game

=== Senior championship ===
No.	Date	Winners	Score	Runners-up	Venue	Stage
1.	24 June 1894	Cork (1)	6-8 - 0-2	Kilkenny	Phoenix Park	All-Ireland final
2.	16 July 1905	Cork (2)	8-9 - 0-8	Kilkenny	Fraher Field	All-Ireland home final
3.	24 June 1906	Kilkenny (1)	1-9 - 1-8	Cork	Carrick-on-Suir	All-Ireland final
4.	30 June 1907	Kilkenny (2)	7-7 - 2-9	Cork	Fraher Field	All-Ireland final refixture
5.	21 June 1908	Kilkenny (3)	3-12 - 4-8	Cork	Fraher Field	All-Ireland final
6.	17 November 1912	Kilkenny (4)	2-1 - 1-3	Cork	Jones's Road	All-Ireland final
7.	24 October 1926	Cork (3)	4-6 - 2-0	Kilkenny	Croke Park	All-Ireland final
8.	6 September 1931	Cork	1-6 - 1-6	Kilkenny	Croke Park	All-Ireland final
9.	11 October 1931	Cork	2-5 - 2-5	Kilkenny	Croke Park	All-Ireland final replay
10.	1 November 1931	Cork (4)	5-8 - 3-4	Kilkenny	Croke Park	All-Ireland second replay
11.	3 September 1939	Kilkenny (5)	2-7 - 3-3	Cork	Croke Park	All-Ireland final
12.	1 September 1946	Cork (5)	7-5 - 3-8	Kilkenny	Croke Park	All-Ireland final
13.	7 September 1947	Kilkenny (6)	0-14 - 2-7	Cork	Croke Park	All-Ireland final
14.	4 September 1966	Cork (6)	3-9 - 1-10	Kilkenny	Croke Park	All-Ireland final
15.	7 September 1969	Kilkenny (7)	2-15 - 2-9	Cork	Croke Park	All-Ireland final
16.	7 September 1972	Kilkenny (8)	3-24 - 5-11	Cork	Croke Park	All-Ireland final
17.	4 September 1978	Cork (7)	1-15 - 2-8	Kilkenny	Croke Park	All-Ireland final
18.	5 September 1982	Kilkenny (9)	3-18 - 1-13	Cork	Croke Park	All-Ireland final
19.	4 September 1983	Kilkenny (10)	2-14 - 2-12	Cork	Croke Park	AISHC final
20.	6 September 1992	Kilkenny (11)	3-10 - 1-12	Cork	Croke Park	AISHC final
21.	12 September 1999	Cork (8)	0-13 - 0-12	Kilkenny	Croke Park	All-Ireland final
22.	14 September 2003	Kilkenny (12)	1-14 - 1-11	Cork	Croke Park	All-Ireland final
23.	12 September 2004	Cork (9)	0-17 - 0-9	Kilkenny	Croke Park	All-Ireland final
24.	3 September 2006	Kilkenny (13)	1-16 - 1-13	Cork	Croke Park	All-Ireland final
25.	10 August 2008	Kilkenny (14)	1-23 - 0-17	Cork	Croke Park	All-Ireland semi-final
26.	8 August 2010	Kilkenny (15)	3-22 - 0-19	Cork	Croke Park	All-Ireland semi-final
27.	28 July 2013	Cork (10)	0-19 - 0-14	Kilkenny	Semple Stadium	All-Ireland quarter-final
28.	14 July 2019	Kilkenny (16)	2-27 - 3-18	Cork	Croke Park	All-Ireland quarter-final
29.	8 August 2021	Cork (11)	1-37 - 1-32	Kilkenny	Croke Park	All-Ireland semi-final

Team	Final (Draw)	Semi-Final	Qtr-final	Qualifiers	Total
Kilkenny	13 (2)	2	1	0	16 (2)
Cork	9 (2)	1	1	0	11 (2)
Combined	24 (incl. 2 draws)	3	2	0	29 (2)

=== National League ===
No.	Date	Winners	Score	Runners-up	Venue	Stage
1.	18 April 1926	Cork (1)	8-6 - 1-3	Kilkenny	Cork Athletic Grounds	Round 4
2.	1 May 1927	Cork (2)	3-4 - 2-3	Kilkenny	Nowlan Park	Round 4
3.	30 March 1930	Cork (3)	9-2 - 5-1	Kilkenny	Nowlan Park	Round 1
4.	1 March 1931	Cork (4)	4-6 - 4-4	Kilkenny	Cork Athletic Grounds	Round 1
5.	6 November 1932	Kilkenny (1)	2-5 - 2-2	Cork	Nowlan Park	Round 2
6.	29 October 1933	Kilkenny (2)	5-4 - 5-2	Cork	Cork Athletic Grounds	Round 2
7.	21 October 1934	Kilkenny (3)	5-5 - 2-7	Cork	The Mardyke	Round 2
8.	20 October 1935	Cork (5)	5-4 - 2-2	Kilkenny	Nowlan Park	Round 2
9.	29 November 1936	Cork (6)	6-5 - 2-2	Kilkenny	Cork Athletic Grounds	Round 5
10.	8 February 1938	Cork (7)	6-11 - 4-5	Kilkenny	Cork Athletic Grounds	Round 3
11.	4 December 1938	Kilkenny (4)	5-6 - 2-3	Cork	Nowlan Park	Round 2
12.	22 October 1939	Cork (8)	6-5 - 4-7	Kilkenny	Nowlan Park	Round 1
13.	17 November 1940	Cork (9)	6-3 - 1-6	Kilkenny	Nowlan Park	Round 3
14.	10 February 1946	Cork (10)	5-6 - 4-3	Kilkenny	Nowlan Park	Round 3
15.	28 September 1947	Cork (11)	5-7 - 0-5	Kilkenny	Cork Athletic Grounds	Round 3
16.	11 April 1948	Cork (12)	4-9 - 3-8	Kilkenny	Nowlan Park	Round 5
17.	7 November 1948	Cork	1-7 - 1-7	Kilkenny	Cork Athletic Grounds	Round 2
18.	6 February 1949	Cork (13)	5-11 - 4-5	Kilkenny	Croke Park	League semi-final
19.	6 November 1949	Kilkenny (5)	8-10 - 2-1	Cork	Nowlan Park	Round 1
20.	5 November 1950	Kilkenny (6)	3-10 - 2-9	Cork	Cork Athletic Grounds	Round 1
21.	28 October 1951	Kilkenny (7)	2-7 - 3-2	Cork	Cork Athletic Grounds	Round 2
22.	9 November 1952	Cork (14)	4-5 - 3-2	Kilkenny	Nowlan Park	Round 2
23.	1 November 1953	Kilkenny (8)	5-2 - 1-5	Cork	Nowlan Park	Round 2
24.	13 February 1955	Kilkenny (9)	5-3 - 2-2	Cork	Nowlan Park	Round 2
25.	30 October 1955	Cork (15)	4-11 - 2-7	Kilkenny	Cork Athletic Grounds	Round 2
26.	28 October 1956	Kilkenny (10)	5-15 - 2-9	Cork	Nowlan Park	Round 1
27.	30 March 1958	Cork (16)	4-6 - 3-3	Kilkenny	Cork Athletic Grounds	Round 4
28.	5 April 1959	Cork	5-8 - 6-5	Kilkenny	Nowlan Park	Round 6
29.	11 October 1959	Kilkenny (11)	5-7 - 3-7	Cork	Cork Athletic Grounds	Round 1
30.	30 October 1960	Kilkenny	2-2 - 1-5	Cork	Nowlan Park	Round 1
31.	6 May 1962	Kilkenny (12)	1-16 - 1-8	Cork	Croke Park	League final
32.	1 March 1964	Cork (17)	3-9 - 1-6	Kilkenny	Cork Athletic Grounds	Round 3
33.	14 March 1965	Kilkenny (13)	3-6 - 1-11	Cork	Nowlan Park	Round 3
34.	8 May 1966	Kilkenny (14)	4-11 - 1-8	Cork	Croke Park	League semi-final
35.	6 December 1970	Cork (18)	1-14 - 2-10	Kilkenny	Cork Athletic Grounds	Round 1
36.	7 November 1971	Kilkenny (15)	2-18 - 2-8	Cork	Nowlan Park	Round 2
37.	5 November 1972	Cork (19)	1-11 - 1-7	Kilkenny	Cork Athletic Grounds	Round 2
38.	4 November 1973	Cork (20)	3-9 - 1-12	Kilkenny	Nowlan Park	Round 3
39.	24 November 1974	Cork (21)	1-14 - 2-9	Kilkenny	The Mardyke	Round 5
40.	8 February 1976	Cork (22)	1-11 - 0-12	Kilkenny	Nowlan Park	Round 5
41.	4 April 1976	Cork	2-11 - 3-8	Kilkenny	Semple Stadium	League semi-final
42.	25 April 1976	Kilkenny (16)	2-17 - 3-10	Cork	Semple Stadium	League semi-final replay
43.	10 October 1976	Kilkenny (17)	3-10 - 1-8	Cork	Páirc Uí Chaoimh	Round 1
44.	20 November 1977	Kilkenny (18)	1-6 - 1-2	Cork	Nowlan Park	Round 3
45.	2 December 1979	Cork (23)	1-5 - 0-4	Kilkenny	Páirc Uí Chaoimh	Round 3
46.	20 March 1983	Kilkenny (19)	3-13 - 0-11	Cork	Nowlan Park	Round 6
47.	26 February 1984	Cork (24)	0-13 - 0-11	Kilkenny	Páirc Uí Chaoimh	Round 7
48.	10 February 1985	Cork (25)	4-10 - 2-7	Kilkenny	John Locke Park	Round 7
49.	8 March 1986	Kilkenny (20)	3-10 - 3-7	Cork	Páirc Uí Chaoimh	Round 7
50.	27 April 1986	Kilkenny (21)	2-15 - 1-8	Cork	Semple Stadium	League semi-final
51.	15 February 1987	Cork (26)	4-10 - 2-7	Kilkenny	Nowlan Park	Round 6
52.	21 February 1988	Kilkenny (22)	4-7 - 2-6	Cork	Páirc Uí Chaoimh	Round 6
53.	2 April 1989	Kilkenny (23)	1-15 - 1-7	Cork	Semple Stadium	League quarter-final
54.	25 February 1990	Kilkenny	0-13 - 1-10	Cork	Páirc Uí Chaoimh	Round 6
55.	11 November 1990	Cork (27)	4-8 - 0-10	Kilkenny	Páirc Uí Chaoimh	Round 3
56.	20 November 1994	Kilkenny (24)	2-10 - 3-3	Cork	Nowlan Park	Round 4
57.	3 March 1996	Kilkenny (25)	1-16 - 3-8	Cork	Nowlan Park	Round 6
58.	19 July 1997	Kilkenny (26)	3-12 - 1-10	Cork	Páirc Uí Chaoimh	League quarter-final
59.	8 March 1998	Cork (28)	0-16 - 1-8	Kilkenny	Páirc Uí Chaoimh	Round 1
60.	21 February 1999	Cork (29)	0-14 - 1-9	Kilkenny	Páirc Uí Rinn	Round 1
61.	20 February 2000	Kilkenny (27)	1-13 - 0-12	Cork	Nowlan Park	Round 1
62.	24 February 2001	Cork (30)	1-10 - 0-12	Kilkenny	Páirc Uí Chaoimh	Round 2
63.	5 May 2002	Kilkenny (28)	2-15 - 2-14	Cork	Semple Stadium	League final
64.	20 April 2003	Kilkenny (29)	4-17 - 3-12	Cork	Páirc Uí Chaoimh	Round 7
65.	10 April 2005	Kilkenny (30)	1-14 - 1-11	Cork	Páirc Uí Chaoimh	Round 6
66.	10 February 2008	Kilkenny (31)	w/o - scr.	Cork	Páirc Uí Chaoimh	Round 1
67.	5 April 2009	Kilkenny (32)	4-26 - 0-11	Cork	Nowlan Park	Round 6
68.	14 March 2010	Cork (31)	0-18 - 1-13	Kilkenny	Páirc Uí Chaoimh	Round 3
69.	20 February 2011	Kilkenny (33)	0-14 - 1-10	Cork	Nowlan Park	Round 2
70.	25 March 2012	Cork (32)	1-17 - 1-15	Kilkenny	Páirc Uí Chaoimh	Round 4
71.	6 May 2012	Kilkenny (34)	3-21 - 0-16	Cork	Semple Stadium	League final
72.	31 March 2013	Kilkenny (35)	0-20 - 2-12	Cork	Nowlan Park	Round 5
73.	14 February 2015	Kilkenny (36)	1-22 - 2-17	Cork	Páirc Uí Rinn	Round 1
74.	12 March 2016	Kilkenny (37)	2-23 - 2-22	Cork	Páirc Uí Rinn	Round 4
75.	5 March 2017	Kilkenny (38)	0-22 - 0-15	Cork	Nowlan Park	Round 3
77.	27 January 2018	Cork (33)	1-24 - 0-24	Kilkenny	Páirc Uí Chaoimh	Round 1
78.	27 January 2019	Kilkenny (39)	2-18 - 0-17	Cork	Nowlan Park	Round 1
79.	16 March 2019	Cork (34)	2-15 - 1-16	Kilkenny	Nowlan Park	Relegation Play-off
80.	26 March 2022	Cork (35)	1-27 - 2-20	Kilkenny	Páirc Uí Chaoimh	Division 1 Semi-finals
81.	26 March 2023	Kilkenny (40)	2-22 - 0-22	Cork	Nowlan Park	Division 1 Semi-finals
82.	10 February 2024	Kilkenny (41)	0-21 - 1-17	Cork	Páirc Uí Chaoimh	Division 1 Round 2
83.	1 March 2025	Cork (36)	1-22 - 2-16	Kilkenny	Páirc Uí Chaoimh	Division 1 Round 5
84.	1 March 2026	Cork (37)	3-12 - 1-15	Kilkenny	Nowlan Park	Division 1 Round 5

=== Intermediate championship ===
No.	Date	Winners	Score	Runners-up	Venue	Stage
1.	13 September 1997	Cork	0-12 - 1-9	Kilkenny	Fraher Field	All-Ireland s/f replay
2.	27 September 1997	Cork (1)	0-13 - 0-9	Kilkenny	Fraher Field	All-Ireland semi-final
3.	4 September 1999	Kilkenny (1)	4-11 - 2-14	Cork	Fraher Field	All-Ireland semi-final
4.	30 August 2003	Cork (2)	1-21 - 0-23	Kilkenny	Semple Stadium	All-Ireland final
5.	22 August 2004	Cork	2-11 - 2-11	Kilkenny	Semple Stadium	All-Ireland final
6.	4 September 2004	Cork (3)	1-16 - 1-10	Kilkenny	Semple Stadium	All-Ireland final replay
7.	26 August 2006	Cork (4)	3-15 - 1-18	Kilkenny	Fraher Field	All-Ireland final
8.	29 August 2009	Cork (5)	2-23 - 0-16	Kilkenny	Fraher Field	All-Ireland final
9.	28 August 2010	Kilkenny (2)	2-17 - 1-13	Cork	Semple Stadium	All-Ireland final
10.	August 2017	Kilkenny (3)	2-23 - 2-18	Cork	Páirc Uí Chaoimh	All-Ireland final
11.	August 2018	Cork (6)	2-19 - 0-18	Kilkenny	Nowlan Park	All-Ireland final

=== Junior championship ===
No.	Date	Winners	Score	Runners-up	Venue	Stage
1.	16 September 1917	Cork (1)	4-6 - 3-4	Kilkenny	Cork Athletic Grounds	All-Ireland final
2.	24 August 1958	Cork (2)	3-7 - 1-12	Kilkenny	Nowlan Park	All-Ireland semi-final
3.	28 August 1983	Cork (3)	1-11 - 0-10	Kilkenny	Páirc Uí Chaoimh	All-Ireland semi-final
4.	31 July 1984	Kilkenny (1)	2-15 - 2-12	Cork	Nowlan Park	All-Ireland semi-final
5.	16 July 1994	Cork (4)	2-13 - 2-11	Kilkenny	Fraher Field	All-Ireland final

=== Under-21 championship ===
No.	Date	Winners	Score	Runners-up	Venue	Stage
1.	8 September 1968	Cork (1)	2-18 - 3-9	Kilkenny	Walsh Park	All-Ireland final
2.	12 October 1975	Kilkenny (1)	5-13 - 2-19	Cork	Fraher Field	All-Ireland final
3.	19 September 1976	Cork (2)	2-17 - 1-8	Kilkenny	Walsh Park	All-Ireland final
4.	7 October 1977	Kilkenny (2)	2-9 - 1-9	Kilkenny	Semple Stadium	All-Ireland final
5.	11 September 1988	Cork (3)	4-11 - 1-5	Kilkenny	St. Brendan's Park	All-Ireland final

=== Minor championship ===
No.	Date	Winners	Score	Runners-up	Venue	Stage
1.	1 September 1936	Kilkenny (1)	2-4 - 2-3	Cork	Croke Park	All-Ireland final
2.	4 September 1937	Cork (1)	8-5 - 2-7	Kilkenny	Croke Park	All-Ireland final
3.	3 September 1939	Cork (2)	5-2 - 2-2	Kilkenny	Croke Park	All-Ireland final
4.	7 September 1969	Cork (3)	2-15 - 3-6	Kilkenny	Croke Park	All-Ireland final
5.	5 September 1971	Cork (4)	2-11 - 1-11	Kilkenny	Croke Park	All-Ireland final
6.	3 September 1972	Kilkenny (2)	8-7 - 3-9	Cork	Croke Park	All-Ireland final
7.	1 September 1974	Cork (5)	1-10 - 1-8	Kilkenny	Croke Park	All-Ireland final
8.	6 September 1975	Kilkenny (3)	3-19 - 1-4	Cork	Croke Park	All-Ireland final
9.	4 September 1977	Kilkenny	4-8 - 3-11	Cork	Croke Park	All-Ireland final
10.	9 October 1977	Kilkenny (4)	1-8 - 0-9	Cork	Semple Stadium	All-Ireland final replay
11.	3 September 1978	Cork (6)	1-15 - 1-8	Kilkenny	Croke Park	All-Ireland final
12.	2 September 1979	Cork (7)	2-11 - 1-9	Kilkenny	Croke Park	All-Ireland final
13.	4 September 1988	Kilkenny (5)	3-13 - 0-12	Cork	Croke Park	All-Ireland final
14.	2 September 1990	Kilkenny	3-14 - 3-14	Cork	Croke Park	All-Ireland final
15.	30 September 1990	Kilkenny (6)	3-16 - 0-11	Cork	Semple Stadium	All-Ireland final replay
16.	3 September 1995	Cork (8)	2-10 - 1-2	Kilkenny	Croke Park	All-Ireland final
17.	13 September 1998	Cork (9)	2-15 - 1-9	Kilkenny	Croke Park	All-Ireland final
18.	19 August 2001	Cork (10)	3-13 - 1-13	Kilkenny	Croke Park	All-Ireland semi-final
19.	17 August 2003	Kilkenny (7)	0-15 - 2-8	Cork	Croke Park	All-Ireland semi-final

== Records ==
=== Scorelines ===
- Biggest championship win:
  - For Cork: Cork 6-8 - 0-2 Kilkenny, All-Ireland final, Phoenix Park, 24 June 1894
  - For Kilkenny: Kilkenny 7-7 - 2-9 Cork, All-Ireland final refixture, Fraher Field, 30 June 1907
- Biggest league win:
  - For Cork: Cork 8-6 - 1-3 Kilkenny, National League Round 4, Cork Athletic Grounds, 18 April 1926
  - For Kilkenny:
    - Kilkenny 8-10 - 2-1 Cork, National League Round 1, Nowlan Park, 6 November 1949
    - Kilkenny 4-26 - 0-11 Cork, National League Round 6, Nowlan Park, 5 April 2009
- Highest aggregate:
  - Kilkenny 3-24 - 5-11 Cork, All-Ireland final, Croke Park, 7 September 1972

=== Most appearances ===
Team	Player	Championship games	Total
Cork	Donal Óg Cusack	1999, 2003, 2004, 2006, 2008, 2010	6
Cork	Ben O'Connor	1999, 2003, 2004, 2006, 2008, 2010	6
Cork	Seán Óg Ó hAilpín	1999, 2003, 2004, 2006, 2008, 2010	6
Kilkenny	Henry Shefflin	1999, 2003, 2004, 2006, 2008, 2010, 2013	7

=== Top scorers ===
Team	Player	Score	Total
Cork	Ben O'Connor	1-27	30
Kilkenny	Henry Shefflin	0-37	37

- Top scorer in a single game:
  - For Kilkenny: 2-9
    - Eddie Keher, Kilkenny 3-24 - 5-11 Cork, All-Ireland final, Croke Park, 7 September 1972
  - For Cork: 3-0
    - Colm Sheehan, Cork 3-9 - Kilkenny 1-10, All-Ireland final, Croke Park, 4 September 1966

=== Attendances ===
- Highest attendance:
  - 82,275 - Kilkenny 1-16 - 1-13 Cork, All-Ireland final, Croke Park, 3 September 2006
- Lowest attendance:
  - 1,000 - Cork 6-8 - 0-2 Kilkenny, All-Ireland final, Phoenix Park, 24 June 1894

== Club level ==
As well as the rivalry between the inter-county sides, Cork and Kilkenny club teams have also met on numerous occasions in the various All-Ireland club competitions.

=== Legend ===
Cork club win
Kilkenny club win
Drawn game

=== Senior championship ===
No.	Date	Winners	Score	Runners-up	Venue	Stage
1.	16 March 1975	St. Finbarr's (1)	3-8 - 1-6	Fenians	Croke Park	All-Ireland final
2.	14 March 1976	James Stephens (1)	2-10 - 2-4	Blackrock	Semple Stadium	All-Ireland final
3.	25 March 1979	Blackrock (2)	5-7 - 5-5	Ballyhale Shamrocks	Semple Stadium	All-Ireland final
4.	17 May 1981	Ballyhale Shamrocks (2)	1-15 - 1-11	St. Finbarr's	Semple Stadium	All-Ireland final
5.	15 February 2004	O'Loughlin Gaels	0-19 - 1-16	Newtownshandrum	Semple Stadium	All-Ireland semi-final
6.	21 February 2004	Newtownshandrum (3)	0-14 - 1-8	O'Loughlin Gaels	Semple Stadium	All-Ireland semi-final replay
7.	14 February 2010	Ballyhale Shamrocks (3)	0-19 - 0-17	Newtownshandrum	Semple Stadium	All-Ireland semi-final

=== Intermediate championship ===
No.	Date	Winners	Score	Runners-up	Venue	Stage
1.	12 February 2006	Dicksboro (1)	2-13 - 1-13	Ballinhassig	Croke Park	All-Ireland final
2.	13 February 2011	Ballymartle (1)	3-15 - 1-20	Dicksboro	Croke Park	All-Ireland final

=== Junior championship ===
No.	Date	Winners	Score	Runners-up	Venue	Stage
1.	11 May 2003	Ballinhassig (1)	4-15 - 1-6	Blacks and Whites	Walsh Park	All-Ireland final
2.	11 February 2007	Danesfort (1)	0-12 - 0-10	Kilworth	Fraher Field	All-Ireland semi-final
3.	15 February 2009	Dripsey (2)	2-15 - 0-18	Tullogher-Rosbercon	Croke Park	All-Ireland final
4.	13 February 2011	Meelin (3)	0-12 - 1-5	John Locke's	Croke Park	All-Ireland final
5.	11 February 2012	St Patrick's Ballyragget (2)	0-12 - 0-10	Charleville	Croke Park	All-Ireland final
6.	27 January 2013	Thomastown (3)	3-14 - 1-13	Kildorrery	Leahy Park	All-Ireland semi-final
7.	25 January 2016	Glenmore (4)	3-10 - 1-11	Dungourney	Carriganore Arena	All-Ireland semi-final
5.	19 February 2017	Mayfield (4)	2-16 - 1-18	Mooncoin	Croke Park	All-Ireland final

== Individual rivalries ==
Ring was the first to reach eight All-Ireland medals, gaining a considerable amount of fame and notoriety in the process. He was said to be obsessive about the game, playing senior inter-county between 1939 and 1963, when he retired as the top championship scorer of all time. A decade later Kilkenny's Eddie Keher broke Ring's scoring record. When Keher won his sixth All-Ireland medal in 1975, Kilkenny trainer Tommy Maher said: "At this stage, I must say Eddie Keher is the greatest I've seen. The second greatest was Christy Ring. Up until last year, perhaps, I would have reversed that order. But I have no doubt at all now, because Keher has done so much for the game, has played it so brilliantly, scores so brilliantly and at all times then a thorough gentleman – a credit to the game.".

The emergence of D. J. Carey as a force with Kilkenny in the 1990s brought a new challenger to Ring's status as the undisputed number one hurler of all time. D. J. Carey scored 44 points in All-Ireland Hurling Finals, edging Ring's record by a single point.

By the time of his retirement in 2014, Henry Shefflin had won 10 All-Ireland medals, 11 All Stars, and scored a career championship total of 27–483.

== Players ==
The rivalry between the two teams has not prevented their respective countrymen from playing in each other's club championships, in certain cases to high renown. In 1939 Martin White became one of the first Kilkenny players to play club hurling in Cork when he joined the famous Blackrock club. Over thirty years later Frank Cummins won the first of his three All-Ireland medals at club level with Blackrock. In 2005 ten-time All-Ireland medal winner Henry Shefflin was linked with a move to the Blackrock club.

Cork have also supplied players to various Kilkenny clubs. Three-time All-Ireland club medal winner Donie Collins, a native of Castlehaven, transferred from Blackrock to James Stephens in 1981 and quickly won a record-breaking fourth medal in 1982. In 1989, Cork's four-time dual All-Ireland medal winner Brian Murphy joined the O'Loughlin Gaels club where he became heavily involved as a player and coach.
