= Kilkenny–Tipperary hurling rivalry =

Rivalry in hurling

Kilkenny-Tipperary
- Location: County Kilkenny; County Tipperary
- Teams: Kilkenny; Tipperary
- First meeting: Tipperary 4-07 - 0-00 Kilkenny; 1887 All-Ireland semi-final
- Latest meeting: Tipperary 4-20 – 0-30 Kilkenny; 2025 All-Ireland Senior Hurling Championship (6 July 2025)

Statistics
- Total meetings: 28
- Most wins: Tipperary (16)
- Most player appearances: Lar Corbett (9); J. J. Delaney (9); Henry Shefflin (9)
- Top scorer: Henry Shefflin (2-41)
- All-time series: Championship: Tipperary 16-11 Kilkenny (1 draw); NHL: Kilkenny 21-22 Tipperary (3 draws)

The Kilkenny-Tipperary rivalry is a hurling rivalry between Irish county teams Kilkenny and Tipperary, who first played each other in 1887. It is considered to be one of the biggest rivalries in Gaelic games.

While Tipperary have the second highest number of Munster titles and Kilkenny are the standard bearers in Leinster, they are also two of the most successful teams in the All-Ireland Senior Hurling Championship, having won 61 championship titles between them to date.

As of the completion of the 2016 season the sides have met 27 times in the hurling championship including meeting 20 times at the All Ireland final stage (Tipperary have won 11 of these finals compared to Kilkenny's 8 final wins with 1 draw).

Regarded as two of hurling's "big three", with Cork making up the trio, an All-Ireland final between Tipperary and Kilkenny, is regarded as a special occasion.

== History ==
=== 1887: The beginning ===
The first meeting between the two teams occurred on 27 October 1887, when Kilkenny hosted Tipperary at Urlingford. That All-Ireland semi-final was played on a Thursday afternoon, after both teams turned up at Clonmel the previous Sunday but were not allowed to play as other games were in progress and because the South Tipperary Board was in dispute with the Central Council. In the circumstances, the teams arranged to play on the following Thursday in Urlingford. Tullaroan objected to some of the Thurles players before the game started on the grounds that they were not from the parish. This was accepted but Thurles had no difficulty getting replacements from among their supporters. There were plenty willing to take the place of those who could not play. It was reported that Frank Moloney "refereed with much difficulty".

=== 1895-1900: The rivalry intensifies ===
With Cork withdrawing from the championship and therefore passing up the opportunity to claim a fourth successive All-Ireland title, a Tipperary side represented by Tubberadora faced Kilkenny's Mooncoin in the delayed 1895 All-Ireland final on 16 March 1896. In the first decider to take place at what would later be called Croke Park, Tipperary tore into Kilkenny. Paddy Riordan is said to have scored all but one point of Tipp's total. Mick Coogan captured Kilkenny's only score of the game, as Tipperary claimed a massive 6–8 to 1–0 victory.

On 25 March 1900, Tubberadora once again represented Tipperary in an All-Ireland final showdown with Kilkenny who were represented by Threecastles. The Cats dominated for the opening twenty-three minutes, however, controversy reigned over hand-passed scores which were awarded to Kilkenny in spite of being illegal at the time. Mikey Maher of Tipperary scored a second-half hat-trick to help his side to a huge 7–13 to 3–10 victory.

For only the second time in the history of the championship, Kilkenny faced Tipperary in an All-Ireland semi-final on 29 June 1902. Tipp continued their dominance over their Leinster rivals, and claimed a 1–11 to 1–8 victory.

=== 1909-1916: Kilkenny's first great era ===
After nearly twenty years of near misses, Kilkenny finally arrived at the All-Ireland table by winning their first three titles in a four-year spell between 1904 and 1907. A dispute over the Railway Shield in 1908 resulted in the team withdrawing for the championship, while there was further trouble the following year when a selection row left the team short of substitutes. On 12 December 1909 a Mooncoin selection faced Tipperary representatives Thurles in the All-Ireland decider at the Cork Athletic Grounds. Kilkenny goals proved decisive courtesy of Jimmy Kelly and a hat-trick by Bill Hennebry. A 4–6 to 0–12 victory for Kilkenny meant a first All-Ireland final defeat for Tipperary.

On 28 July 1912, Kilkenny faced Tipperary in an alternative game to the original 1911 All-Ireland final. Limerick were the Munster champions, however, a retreat in the city meant that they pulled out of the decider. Tipperary were then nominated by the Munster Council to play Kilkenny, however, they were defeated by 3–3 to 2–1.

Two years later on 2 November 1913, Kilkenny's representatives Mooncoin faced Tipperary's Toomevara in the All-Ireland decider. As well as being the first fifteen-a-side final, Kilkenny were presented with the opportunity of joining Cork and Tipperary in a list of teams to have won three successive championships. A Matt Gargan goal gave Kilkenny a 1–4 to 1–1 lead at the interval. The second half was a low-scoring affair. Tipperary added just one more point, while Sim Walton got Kilkenny's only score when he bagged a goal with twelve minutes remaining. A 2–4 to 1–2 victory gave Kilkenny their seventh All-Ireland crown in ten championship seasons.

The great Kilkenny team of the first decade of the 20th century went into decline after their 1913 championship triumph, however, they had won last kick in 1916. Tipperary once again provided the opposition on 21 January 1917, as Kilkenny aimed to secure a fourth successive championship defeat of their near neighbours. Tipperary were five points down, however, they came bouncing back for a famous victory. Hugh Shelly scored a hat-trick for Tipperary, however, the game was not without incident as Tipperary's Tommy Shanahan and Kilkenny's Dick Grace were sent off. A 5–4 to 3–2 victory gave Tipperary a first defeat of Kilkenny since the 1900 All-Ireland semi-final.

=== 1922: Kilkenny's last triumph for 45 years ===
In one of the great All-Ireland finals, Kilkenny faced Tipperary in the delayed decider on 9 September 1923. Tipp played into the Canal End for the opening thirty minutes, however, the sides remained deadlocked. With ten minutes remaining Tipperary looked poised for success as they had a one-goal lead. Kilkenny's only All-Ireland medallist, Dick Grace, sent in a speculative seventy yard free towards a crowded Tipp goalmouth. Matty Power, John Roberts, Paddy Donoghue and Dick Tobin were all involved in the action, however, the free went untouched into the net for the equaliser. Tipperary quickly regained the lead with another goal, however, Kilkenny were not finished and two further goals secured a 4–2 to 2–6 victory. Team captain Wattie Dunphy became the first Kilkenny man to lift the newly introduced Liam MacCarthy Cup.

=== 1937-1964: Scarce Encounters ===
A builders' strike at Croke Park in 1937 resulted in an historic All-Ireland final taking place at Fitzgerald Stadium, Killarney on 5 September 1937, however, the game failed to live up to expectations. Newcomer Tommy Doyle pointed for Tipperary virtually from the throw-in. Kilkenny, who had dominated the early part of the decade and were appearing in their sixth final in seven years, had somewhat of a veteran team that failed to match Tipperary's speed. The Cats managed only a brace of points as Tipp notched up 2-8 courtesy of goals by Dinny Murphy and Jimmy "Butler" Coffey. Kilkenny introduced their veteran star, Lory Meagher, at the interval and he scored Kilkenny's solitary score of the second half, a point and the opening score of the period. Tipperary responded with another goal for Dinny Murphy, as they ran out easy winners by 3–11 to 0–3.

A record crowd of 69,459 turned up to Croke Park to see the first post-war All-Ireland decider on 2 September 1945. After four years of one-sided finals which yielded a record-breaking four successive All-Ireland triumphs for Cork, Kilkenny and Tipperary provided one of the best games in years. Tipp faced a strong sun in the opening half and conceded two early points without reply. A goal by Eddie Gleeson after fifteen minutes gave Tipp the lead and by half-time they had stretched their advantage to 4–3 to 0–3. Kilkenny fought back after the interval and goals by Tom Walton, Jack Mulcahy and Seánie O'Brien reduced Tipp's advantage to four points with ten minutes remaining. A Tony Brennan goal settled the game and gave Tipp the impetus once again as they finished the game as champions with a 5–6 to 3–6 victory.

After a five-year absence, Kilkenny faced reigning champions Tipperary in the All-Ireland final on 3 September 1950. Kilkenny played into a gale-force wind and glaring sunshine for the opening period and took a 0–7 to 0–5 lead at the break. Tipperary emerged as a different side after the interval, while Kilkenny changed tactics and passed on several opportunities to stretch their lead with some easy points in favour of trying to engineer goals. A minute from the end Paddy Kenny scored Tipp's only goal of the game to put them four points ahead. Tipperary supporters were still celebrating when Kilkenny's right wing-back Jimmy Kelly sent the sliotar to the net from seventy yards. Kilkenny eagerly awaited the puck-out and the chance to level the game, however, referee and former All-Ireland medallist Con Murphy (Cork) blew full-time. Kilkenny, who were the one point specialists, having won five All-Ireland titles by that margin, were at the wrong end for once as they were downed by 1–9 to 1–8.

For the third time in history, Kilkenny and Tipperary faced each other in an All-Ireland semi-final on 10 August 1958. Galway had received a bye to the All-Ireland final without playing a single game, while this match was seen as the de facto All-Ireland final, Tipperary once again showed that they held the Indian sign over Kilkenny by claiming a 1–13 to 1–8 victory.

The All-Ireland final on 6 September 1964 was Tipperary's fourth All-Ireland in five years, having won the title in both 1961 and 1962, though Kilkenny entered the game as reigning champions and favourites having beaten Waterford the previous year. John "Mackey" McKenna scored Tipp's first goal after ten minutes as the Munster champions took a 1–8 to 0-6 interval lead. The second half saw Tipperary score goals for fun, with Donie Nealon getting a hat-trick and Seán McLoughlin another. Kilkenny were humiliated at the full-time whistle as Tipperary triumphed by 5–13 to 2–8.

=== 1967-1971: Kilkenny breakthrough ===
Kilkenny and Tipperary dominated the late sixties and faced each other in the All-Ireland final on 3 September 1967. The game presented Tipperary's John Doyle with the chance of making history by winning a record-breaking ninth All-Ireland medal, however, it was Kilkenny who made history by claiming a first championship win over Tipp in forty-five years. Kilkenny 'keeper Ollie Walsh earned the Texaco Hurler of the Year award for his performance in the game, having had seven stitches put into his wrist after an accident on the way to the game. Kilkenny were in arrears by six points at the interval, however, it would have been more but for Walsh. Tipperary only scored one point in the second half. The game also ended on a sour note, with Kilkenny centre-forward Tom Walsh needing to have his eye removed as a result of a second-half injury.

In 1971 Kilkenny and Tipperary emerged from their respective provinces to contest the All-Ireland decider on 5 September. The game was notable as it was the first All-Ireland final to be broadcast in colour by Telefís Éireann, a factor which contributed to an attendance of 61,393. Tipperary relied on two freak goals to put them in the driving seat, one of which passed through Ollie Walsh's legs. Kilkenny's Eddie Keher surpassed his own record by scoring 2-11, in spite of ending up on the losing side. The game is also memorable for the fact that Michael "Babs" Keating discarded his boots and socks and played out the last period of the game in his bare feet. The final score of 5–17 to 5-14 gave Tipperary a merited victory and allowed the team to go top of the all-time roll of honour.

=== 1991: A lone meeting ===
On 1 September 1991, Tipperary and Kilkenny renewed their rivalry after a twenty-year hiatus. Tipperary went into the game as firm favourites having come through a replay with All-Ireland champions Cork to win the Munster title and a routine win over Galway in the semi-final. Kilkenny, however, had only progressed after a two-point win over Dublin in the Leinster final and a laboured win over Antrim in the semis. "The Cats" were first to impose themselves on the game but some excellent performances from Tipperarys Ken Hogan, Nicolas English, Pat Fox and a crucial goal from Michael "Skippy" Cleary – from a mishit 21-yard-free – swung the momentum in Tipp's favour as they went on to win by 4 points and extend their all Ireland final dominance over their arch rivals Kilkenny.

=== 2002-2003: Semi-final clashes ===
On 18 August 2002, Leinster champions Kilkenny faced Munster runners-up Tipperary in an All-Ireland semi-final for the first time since 1958. Prior to this meeting Kilkenny had only beaten Tipperary once in the senior hurling championship in the previous 79 years (Tipperary had won 7 of the 8 championship meetings which had taken place since the 1922 All Ireland final (a match did not take place until 1923)). Peter Barry, Andy Comerford and Henry Shefflin were all singled out for particular praise, however, the addition of D. J. Carey to the Kilkenny attack was arguably the principal factor in Tipperary's elimination. In real terms, what was crucial ultimately was Kilkenny's stronger finish, highlighted by Carey's fourth point in injury time.

For the second successive year in 2003, Tipperary maneuvered through the qualifiers to set up a penultimate meeting with reigning All-Ireland champions Kilkenny. After an even first half, Kilkenny gained the initiative through the first of their three goals in the 44th minute, and moved up to a different level. The twelve-point winning margin might have been greater had Kilkenny not been denied so many times in the second half by the absolute brilliance of Brendan Cummins in what was arguably one of the best exhibitions of goalkeeping in more recent times.

=== 2009–2015: Kilkenny Dominance ===
The Kilkenny-Tipperary rivalry reached new heights between 2009 and 2014, with both teams facing each other in some key championship and league games for six consecutive seasons. The renewed rivalry encompassed 16 games including five All-Ireland Finals and a semi-final and three NHL Finals.

In 2009 Tipperary were charged with derailing Kilkenny's bid for a record-equalling fourth successive All-Ireland championship, when a first All-Ireland final between the sides in eighteen years took place on 6 September. A crowd of 82,106 was treated to one of the greatest All-Ireland deciders of all time. Tipperary had to play almost twenty minutes with fourteen men following the dismissal of Benny Dunne, and their resolve was finally broken in the final stages, when referee Diarmuid kirwan awarded a controversial penalty scored by Henry Shefflin and a goal by substitute Martin Comerford finally killed off the heroic efforts of a Tipp side that looked for long periods that they were going to end the reign of Brian Cody's side. A 2–22 to 0–23 victory meant that Kilkenny became only the second county to put four All-Ireland titles back-to-back, joining the great Cork team of the 1940s.

After the All-Ireland final in 2009, Kilkenny had gone twenty-one championship games without a defeat and were chasing a record-breaking fifth successive All-Ireland triumph. Brian Cody's gamble on an injury-ravaged Henry Shefflin did not come off, and the Kilkenny ace was forced to retire injured after just twelve minutes. This compounded an already poor start, when Eoin Kelly had already swept over three frees before Lar Corbett pounced with his first goal in the tenth minute, his first of 3 that afternoon. Even Tipp goalkeeper Brendan Cummins got in on the act with a point from a massive free, and a further goal from Tipperary U21 ace Noel McGrath to add to Lars hat-trick, the first All-Ireland hat-trick in forty years, as Liam Sheedy's side produced a devastating attacking display to secure a 26th All-Ireland title for Tipperary and deny their old rivals Kilkenny a unique piece of GAA history.

The third installment of Kilkenny and Tipperary's All-Ireland trilogy came in 2011. It was the first time since 1903 that two teams had faced each other in three successive All-Ireland decider. Tipperary went into the game as favourites but without their successful management team of Liam Sheedy, Michael Ryan and Eamon o shea, it proved to be the most disappointing of the three All-Ireland deciders. Kilkenny made a flying start, racing into a five-point lead inside the opening thirteen minutes. It took until the 16th minute before Tipperary registered their opening score. Michael Fennelly and Richie Hogan grabbed the vital goals, late in each half, while the Henry Shefflin celebrated his record-equalling eighth All-Ireland medal triumph with a seven-points haul. For the fourth consecutive year, Tipperary faced Kilkenny in the All-Ireland series on 19 August 2012. Kilkenny entered this All-Ireland semi-final with questionable form and intimations of mortality. After a good first half, Tipp led by 1–10 to 1–9 at half-time and an exciting second half was in prospect. This did not materialise and Kilkenny blew Tipperary off the pitch in the second half, outscoring them 3–15 to 0–5.

In what quickly became known as "the great levelling off championship", two of the favourites for the All-Ireland title faced each other in the All-Ireland qualifiers on 6 July 2013. In the first ever meeting of the two sides in the qualifiers, Tipperary were fancied to finally kill off a Kilkenny team who were playing a third major game in as many weeks. A crowd of 23,307 packed Nowlan Park for a rip-roaring encounter. The sides were level at half-time – 1–6 to 0-9 – as 2010 Hurler of the Year Lar Corbett struck for Tipp's goal before retiring with a hamstring injury. The return of Henry Shefflin after a prolonged absence due to injury provided one of the main talking points, with the nine-time All-Ireland medallist making a cameo appearance near the end. It was another psychological masterstroke from manager Brian Cody and a tide of emotion swept Kilkenny over the line.

It's been lauded as the greatest hurling final ever,
even the greatest hurling game ever. Whatever
about being the best game or final ever, last Sunday
surely confirmed that the rivalry between this set of
Kilkenny hurlers and this group of Tipperary hurlers
is the greatest in GAA history.

— Kieran Shannon of the Irish Examiner lauds the
rivalry following the drawn 2014 All-Ireland final

On 7 September 2014 Leinster champions Kilkenny faced back-door finalists Tipperary in an All-Ireland decider. Regarded as one of the greatest games of all-time, Tipp's Séamus Callanan and John O'Dwyer, who contributed 0-14 between them, had dubious penalties saved in either half by Kilkenny goalkeeper Eoin Murphy. Similarly, Lar Corbett smashed a second-half shot off Murphy's right-hand upright at the Canal End while a Gearóid Ryan shot went over when well placed for a goal. Richie Power and T. J. Reid bagged three goals between them for Kilkenny as they held a one-point lead as a tumultuous second half neared its conclusion. John O'Dwyer scored a crucial free in the 68th minute to level the game once again, however, there was time for one more dramatic twist as Kilkenny's Brian Hogan was judged to have charged into Pádraic Maher and a free awarded. With time running out John O'Dwyer was charged with landing a 97-metre free to win the All-Ireland. O'Dwyer's shot looked good, however, after consultation the umpires were undecided and Hawk-Eye was called into play. The last action of the game confirmed that O'Dwyer's shot drifted inches wide and, for the first time ever, the sides finished level with the Cats recording 3–22 to Tipperary's 1-28

In the replay on 27 September 2014, second-half goals from brothers Richie and John Power inspired Kilkenny to a 2–17 to 2-14 All-Ireland triumph at Croke Park to win their 10th All Ireland title in 15 seasons and leave Tipperary with a record of only 1 win from their last 9 championship meetings with Kilkenny.

=== 2016 and 2019 - Tipperary triumph ===
Two years later on 4 September 2016, Tipperary comprehensively defeated Kilkenny by 2–29 to 2–20 to win their 27th All-Ireland title and stop Kilkenny from winning three in a row. Tipperary went on to beat their old rivals Kilkenny once again on 18 August 2019 to win the 28th All-Ireland title. Tipperary won the game by 14 points, against 14 man Kilkenny when Richie Hogan was sent off, it was the largest defeat by a Kilkenny team managed by Brian Cody and the largest defeat by a Kilkenny team since 1964 All Ireland which was also lost to Tipperary.

== Statistics ==
There have been 28 championship meetings between the teams (As of the completion of the 2022 All Ireland Hurling championship). Tipperary have won 15 of these matches, Kilkenny have won 12 of these matches and 1 of these matches have ended in a draw.

The biggest margin of victory came in the 1895 All-Ireland final when Tipperary defeated Kilkenny by 6–8 to 1–0, a victory of twenty-three points. Other one-sided victories in Tipperary's favour came in the 1887 All-Ireland final (4-7 to 0-00), the 1937 All-Ireland final (3-11 to 0-3) and the 1898 All-Ireland final (7-13 to 3-10). In recent times Kilkenny reversed this trend, dishing out a 4–24 to 1-15 trouncing in the 2012 All-Ireland semi-final. The largest attendance for a Kilkenny-Tipperary match was 82,106 for the All-Ireland final on 6 September 2009 at Croke Park.

Up to date as of 2022 season

Team	All-Ireland	Provincial	National League	Total
Kilkenny	36	74	19	129
Tipperary	28	42	19	89
Combined	64	116	38	218

== All time results ==
=== Championship ===
No.	Date	Winners	Score	Runners-up	Venue	Stage
1.	27 October 1887	Tipperary (1)	4-7 - 0-00	Kilkenny	Urlingford	AISHC semi-final
2.	15 March 1896	Tipperary (2)	6-8 - 1-0	Kilkenny	Jones's Road	AISHC final
3.	25 March 1900	Tipperary (3)	7-13 - 3-10	Kilkenny	Jones's Road	AISHC final
4.	29 June 1902	Tipperary (4)	1-11 - 1-8	Kilkenny	Jones's Road	AISHC semi-final
5.	12 December 1909	Kilkenny (1)	4-6 - 0-12	Tipperary	Cork Athletic Grounds	AISHC final
7.	2 November 1913	Kilkenny (3)	2-4 - 1-2	Tipperary	Croke Park	AISHC final
8.	21 January 1917	Tipperary (5)	5-4 - 3-2	Kilkenny	Croke Park	AISHC final
9.	9 September 1923	Kilkenny (4)	4-2 - 2-6	Tipperary	Croke Park	AISHC final
10.	5 September 1937	Tipperary (6)	3-11 - 0-3	Kilkenny	FitzGerald Stadium	AISHC final
11.	2 September 1945	Tipperary (7)	5-6 - 3-6	Kilkenny	Croke Park	AISHC final
12.	3 September 1950	Tipperary (8)	1-9 - 1-8	Kilkenny	Croke Park	AISHC final
13.	10 August 1958	Tipperary (9)	1-13 - 1-8	Kilkenny	Croke Park	AISHC semi-final
14.	6 September 1964	Tipperary (10)	5-13 - 2-8	Kilkenny	Croke Park	AISHC final
15.	3 September 1967	Kilkenny (5)	3-8 - 2-7	Tipperary	Croke Park	AISHC final
16.	5 September 1971	Tipperary (11)	5-17 - 5-14	Kilkenny	Croke Park	AISHC final
17.	1 September 1991	Tipperary (12)	1-16 - 0-15	Kilkenny	Croke Park	AISHC final
18.	18 August 2002	Kilkenny (6)	1-20 - 1-16	Tipperary	Croke Park	AISHC semi-final
19.	17 August 2003	Kilkenny (7)	3-18 - 0-15	Tipperary	Croke Park	AISHC semi-final
20.	6 September 2009	Kilkenny (8)	2-22 - 0-23	Tipperary	Croke Park	AISHC final
21.	5 September 2010	Tipperary (13)	4-17 - 1-18	Kilkenny	Croke Park	AISHC final
22.	4 September 2011	Kilkenny (9)	2-17 - 1-16	Tipperary	Croke Park	AISHC final
23.	19 August 2012	Kilkenny (10)	4-24 - 1-15	Tipperary	Croke Park	AISHC semi-final
24.	6 July 2013	Kilkenny (11)	0-20 - 1-14	Tipperary	Nowlan Park	AISHC qualifier
25.	7 September 2014	Kilkenny	3-22 - 1-28	Tipperary	Croke Park	AISHC final
26.	27 September 2014	Kilkenny (12)	2-17 - 2-14	Tipperary	Croke Park	AISHC final replay
27.	4 September 2016	Tipperary (14)	2-29 - 2-20	Kilkenny	Croke Park	AISHC final
28.	18 August 2019	Tipperary (15)	3-25 - 0-20	Kilkenny	Croke Park	AISHC final
29.	6 July 2025	Tipperary (16)	4-20 - 0-30	Kilkenny	Croke Park	AISHC semi-final

Team	Final (Draw)	Semi-Final	Qualifiers	Total
Kilkenny	8 (1)	3	1	12 (1)
Tipperary	12 (1)	3	0	15 (1)
Combined	20 (incl. 1 draw)	6	1	28

=== National Hurling League ===
Date	Winners	Score	Runners-up	Venue	Stage
1947	Kilkenny	3-12 - 2-6	Tipperary	Nowlan Park	NHL semi-final
7 May 1950	Tipperary	3-8 - 1-10	Kilkenny		NHL final
9 May 1954	Tipperary	3-10 - 1-4	Kilkenny	Croke Park	NHL final
12 May 1957	Tipperary	3-11 - 2-7	Kilkenny	Croke Park	NHL final
21 April 1963	Tipperary	2-12 - 2-9	Kilkenny	Thurles Sportsfield	NHL semi-final
23 May 1965	Tipperary	3-14 - 2-8	Kilkenny	Croke Park	NHL "home" final
22 May 1966	Kilkenny	0-9 - 0-7	Tipperary	Croke Park	NHL "home" final
12 May 1968	Tipperary	3-9 - 1-13	Kilkenny		NHL "home" final
10 April 1977	Kilkenny	3-12 - 2-9	Tipperary	Semple Stadium	NHL final
16 April 1989	Tipperary	0-15 - 1-11	Kilkenny	Croke Park	NHL semi-final
November 1990	Kilkenny	1-12 - 2-09	Tipperary	Semple Stadium	Group stage
3 November 1991	Tipperary	2-18 - 1-11	Kilkenny	Semple Stadium	Group stage
10 April 1994	Tipperary	2-18 - 1-12	Kilkenny	Croke Park	NHL quarter-final
15 November 1992	Tipperary	1-10 - 1-9	Kilkenny	Nowlan Park	Group stage
10 April 1994	Tipperary	2-18 - 1-12	Kilkenny	Croke Park	NHL quarter-final
6 November 1994	Kilkenny	2-12 - 1-10	Tipperary	Semple Stadium	Group stage
24 March 1996	Kilkenny	0-14 - 1-10	Tipperary	Nowlan Park	Group stage
31 May 1997	Tipperary	3-19 - 3-11	Kilkenny	Semple Stadium	Group stage
29 March 1998	Tipperary	3-13 - 1-13	Kilkenny	Semple Stadium	Group stage
28 March 1999	Kilkenny	3-14 - 1-13	Tipperary	Nowlan Park	Group stage
26 March 2000	Kilkenny	2-14 - 2-9	Tipperary	Semple Stadium	Group stage
8 April 2001	Tipperary	1-12 - 0-15	Kilkenny	Nowlan Park	Group stage
13 April 2003	Tipperary	2-19 - 2-16	Kilkenny	Nowlan Park	Group stage
5 May 2003	Kilkenny	5-14 - 5-13	Tipperary	Croke Park	NHL final
24 April 2005	Kilkenny	3-18 - 2-16	Tipperary	Nowlan Park	Group stage
26 February 2006	Kilkenny	0-19 - 0-10	Tipperary	Semple Stadium	Group stage
23 April 2006	Kilkenny	3-20 - 2-11	Tipperary	Semple Stadium	NHL semi-final
4 March 2007	Tipperary	3-13 - 2-13	Kilkenny	Nowlan Park	Group stage
12 April 2008	Tipperary	1-15 - 1-10	Kilkenny	Nowlan Park	NHL semi-final
22 March 2009	Kilkenny	5-17 - 1-12	Tipperary	Nowlan Park	Group stage
3 May 2009	Kilkenny	2-26 - 4-17 (aet)	Tipperary	Semple Stadium	NHL final
7 March 2010	Tipperary	1-14 - 0-13	Kilkenny	Semple Stadium	Group stage
12 February 2011	Kilkenny	1-17 - 1-10	Tipperary	Semple Stadium	Group stage
26 February 2012	Kilkenny	2-17 - 0-15	Tipperary	Nowlan Park	Group stage
10 March 2013	Tipperary	2-17 - 1-19	Kilkenny	Semple Stadium	Group stage
5 May 2013	Kilkenny	2-17 - 0-20	Tipperary	Nowlan Park	NHL final
23 February 2014	Kilkenny	5-20 - 5-14	Tipperary	Nowlan Park	Group stage
4 May 2014	Kilkenny	2-25 - 1-27 (aet)	Tipperary	Semple Stadium	NHL final
15 March 2015	Tipperary	2-22 - 1-13	Kilkenny	Semple Stadium	Group stage
21 February 2016	Kilkenny	2-17 - 0-18	Tipperary	Nowlan Park	Group stage
12 March 2017	Tipperary	2-17 - 3-14	Kilkenny	Semple Stadium	Group stage
25 February 2018	Kilkenny	2-22 - 2-21	Tipperary	Nowlan Park	Group stage
8 April 2018	Kilkenny	2-23-2-17	Tipperary	Nowlan Park	NHL Final
24 February 2019	Kilkenny	0-18-0-17	Tipperary	Semple Stadium	Group stage
13 February 2022	Tipperary	1-19 - 1-18	Kilkenny	Semple Stadium	Group stage
12 February 2023	Tipperary	2-24 - 1-21	Kilkenny	Nowlan Park	Group stage
9 March 2025	Tipperary	2-25 - 1-19	Kilkenny	Nowlan Park	Group stage

Team	Final	Semi/1/4 finals	Group stage (Draw)	Total
Kilkenny	7	2	12 (3)	21 (3)
Tipperary	5	5	13 (3)	22 (3)
Combined	12	7	25	43

As well as regularly meeting in the group stage of the National Hurling League, Kilkenny have faced Tipperary in many games in the knock-out stages of the competition.

In 1947 Kilkenny defeated Tipperary by 3–12 to 2–6 in the semi-final of the league. Not only was it their first meeting in the latter stages of the secondary competition, but it was also Kilkenny's first victory over Tipperary in a major game since the 1922 All-Ireland final. This defeat proved to be a temporary blip for Tipperary, as the dominance that they enjoyed over their nearest neighbours resumed immediately and lasted for another twenty years.

The mid sixties saw Kilkenny play Tipperary regularly in the latter stages of the league. On 22 May 1966 Kilkenny defeated Tipperary by 0–9 to 0–7 in the "home" final. Kilkenny later defeated New York to secure their first National League triumph since 1932–33.

Two years later on 12 May 1968, Kilkenny faced Tipperary in the league decider. By this stage the relationship between the counties – rarely one of hurling's most pleasant – had reached an all-time low. Previously in a league match in the spring of 1967, Pa Dillon and Babs Keating had got the line and a three-month suspension for both ensued. This game really upped the ante between the counties and from the moment Len Gaynor was tackled by a Kilkenny supporter, the game featured some of the most gratuitous violence ever seen at Croke Park. Tipp won the game by 3–9 to 1-13. After much discussion and investigation after the Kilkenny game, John Flanagan and Kilkenny's Ollie Walsh both incurred a six-month suspension, which meant that both players missed the championship in 1968, or at least the parts that occurred after the suspensions were announced in July. Perceived unfair and hyper-critical press coverage led the Tipperary county board to withdraw co-operation with certain journalists for the All-Ireland final, and the National Union of Journalists responded by refusing to provide any reports or news concerning Tipperary. Kilkenny also deferred their county championship until Ollie Walsh's term of suspension was up.

After only a handful of knock-out meetings since the 1960s, the dawn of the new century saw Kilkenny face Tipperary on five knock-out occasions between 2003 and 2013. Kilkenny's championship dominance extended to the league, with "the Cats" claiming victory on four occasions. The 2003 and 2009 league deciders were singled out for particular praise for the quality of the play.

== Records ==
=== Scorelines ===
- Biggest championship win:
  - For Kilkenny: Kilkenny 4-24 - 1-15 Tipperary, 2012 All-Ireland semi-final, Croke Park, 19 August 2012
  - For Tipperary: Tipperary 6-8 - 1-0 Kilkenny, 1895 All-Ireland final, Jones's Road, 15 March 1896
- Highest aggregate:
  - Tipperary 1-28 - 3-22 Kilkenny, 2014 All-Ireland final, Croke Park, 7 September 2014

=== Most appearances ===
Team	Player	Championship games	Total
Kilkenny	J. J. Delaney	2002, 2003, 2009, 2010, 2011, 2012, 2013, 2014 (draw), 2014 (replay)	9
Kilkenny	Henry Shefflin	2002, 2003, 2009, 2010, 2011, 2012, 2013, 2014 (draw), 2014 (replay)	9
Tipperary	Lar Corbett	2002, 2003, 2009, 2010, 2011, 2012, 2013, 2014 (draw), 2014 (replay)	9

=== Top scorers ===
Team	Player	Score	Total
Kilkenny	Henry Shefflin	2-41	47
Tipperary	Eoin Kelly	0-45	45

- Top scorer in a single game:
  - For Tipperary: 0-13
    - Eoin Kelly, Tipperary 0-23 - 2-22 Kilkenny, All-Ireland final, Croke Park, 6 September 2009
  - For Kilkenny: 2-11
    - Eddie Keher, Kilkenny 5-14 - 5-17 Tipperary, 1971 All-Ireland final, Croke Park, 5 September 1971
