= 1935 All-Ireland Senior Hurling Championship final =

1935 All-Ireland Senior Hurling Final
- Event: 1935 All-Ireland Senior Hurling Championship
Kilkenny	Limerick
2-5	2-4
- Date: 1 September 1935
- Venue: Croke Park, Dublin
- Referee: Tommy Daly (Clare)
- Attendance: 46,591

The 1935 All-Ireland Senior Hurling Championship Final was the 48th All-Ireland Final and the culmination of the 1935 All-Ireland Senior Hurling Championship, an inter-county hurling tournament for the top teams in Ireland. The match was held at Croke Park, Dublin, on 1 September 1935, between Limerick and Kilkenny. The Munster champions narrowly lost to their Leinster opponents on a score line of 2–5 to 2–4.

== Match report ==
At 3:15pm the former Clare hurler and match referee Tommy Daly got the game underway in earnest. Limerick, after coming through a tough provincial campaign in Munster were regarded as the favourites while the Kilkenny team were regarded as being too old to trouble the Munster men who were undefeated in 35 games over the course of two years. A record crowd of 46,591, for any GAA match up to that point, thronged Croke Park in anticipation of a hurling classic. The elements conspired against the hurlers as the rain came down in torrents during the entire game. In spite of this, both teams served up an epic encounter. Kilkenny had their homework done on Limerick before the game. Team captain Lory Meagher urged his team to keep the sliothar on the ground and keep it moving quickly. This was designed to combat the stylish Limerick players who preferred aerial battle. Meagher conducted the Kilkenny attack from midfield and set up some important scores. After an exciting opening half the Kilkenny team had a narrow 1–3 to 1–2 lead. Limerick's goal came after Mick Mackey sent a free crashing to the net.

Immediately after the restart Limerick equalized and an exciting thirty minutes was in prospect. A hectic ten-minute passage of play saw the sliothar move all over the field; however, neither side recorded a score. Then Lory Meagher sent over a point to give Kilkenny a lead that they would never surrender. Martin White added a point shortly afterwards to give Kilkenny a two-point cushion. Kilkenny were well on top going into the last quarter as Lory Meagher stepped up to take a sideline cut. He landed the sliothar into Martin White's hand and he made no mistake in turning around and crashing it into the net. With ten minutes left to play Kilkenny were five points ahead and had one hand on the cup. The game was not over yet as Paddy McMahon goaled for Limerick before Mickey Cross sent over a point to cut the deficit to the minimum. Immediately after the puck-out Limerick launched an all-out attack on the Kilkenny goalmouth in search of an equalizer or a winner, however, the Kilkenny defence stood firm. Tommy Daly sounded the full-time whistle shortly afterwards and Kilkenny were the champions with a 2–5 to 2–4 win.

== Match details ==
1935-09-01
15:15 UTC+1

Kilkenny	2-5 – 2-4	Limerick

Croke Park, Dublin
Attendance: 46,591
Referee: T. Daly (Clare)

Kilkenny	Limerick
