= Senator Mahar =

Senator Mahar may refer to:

- William F. Mahar Jr. (born 1947), Illinois State Senate
- William F. Mahar Sr. (1919–2006), Illinois State Senate
