= William F. Mahar =

William F. Mahar may refer to:

- William F. Mahar Jr. (born 1947), American politician
- William F. Mahar Sr. (1919–2006), American politician
