= 1935 All-Ireland Senior Hurling Championship =

Championship details
- Dates: 12 May – 1 September 1935
- Teams: 13

All-Ireland champions
- Winning team: Kilkenny (11th win)
- Captain: Lory Meagher

All-Ireland Finalists
- Losing team: Limerick
- Captain: Timmy Ryan

Provincial champions
- Munster: Limerick
- Leinster: Kilkenny
- Ulster: Not Played
- Connacht: Not Played

Championship statistics
- No. matches played: 13
- Goals total: 92 (7.07 per game)
- Points total: 141 (10.84 per game)
- All-Star Team: See here

The All-Ireland Senior Hurling Championship 1935 was the 49th series of the All-Ireland Senior Hurling Championship, Ireland's premier hurling knock-out competition. Kilkenny won the championship, beating Limerick 2–5 to 2–4 in the final.

== Teams ==
A total of thirteen teams contested the championship.

The Leinster championship was once again contested by the seven strongest hurling teams in the province. The Munster championship was contested by the five strongest hurling teams as Kerry did not field a team.

Galway, who had faced no competition in the Connacht championship since 1923, once again received a bye to the All-Ireland semi-final. There were no representatives from the Ulster championship in the All-Ireland series of games.

== Format ==
Leinster Championship

First round: (1 match) This was a single match between the first two teams drawn from the province of Leinster. One team was eliminated at this stage while the winning team advanced to the quarter-finals.

Quarter-finals: (2 matches) The winners of the lone quarter-final joined three remaining Leinster teams to make up the quarter-final pairings. Two teams were eliminated at this stage while the two winning teams advanced to the semi-finals.

Semi-finals: (2 matches) The winners of the two quarter-finals joined the two remaining Leinster teams to make up the semi-final pairings. Two teams were eliminated at this stage while the two winning teams advanced to the final.

Final: (1 match) The winners of the two semi-finals contested this game. One team was eliminated at this stage while the winning team advanced to the All-Ireland semi-final.

Munster Championship

Quarter-final: (1 match) This was a single match between the first two teams drawn from the province of Munster. One team was eliminated at this stage while the winning team advanced to the semi-finals.

Semi-finals: (2 matches) The winners of the lone quarter-final joined the three remaining Munster teams to make up the semi-final pairings. Two teams were eliminated at this stage while the two winning teams advanced to the final.

Final: (1 match) The winners of the two semi-finals contested this game. One team was eliminated at this stage while the winning team advanced to the All-Ireland final.

All-Ireland Championship

Semi-final: (1 match) The winners of the Leinster championship were drawn to play Galway, who received a bye to this stage of the championship. One team was eliminated at this stage while the winning team advanced to the final.

Final: (1 match) The winners of the lone semi-final and the Munster champions contested this game with the winners being declared All-Ireland champions.

== Provincial championships ==
=== Leinster Senior Hurling Championship ===
Preliminary round

19 May 1935 Preliminary round	Meath	3–05 – 3-03	Wexford	Croke Park, Dublin
	J Loughran 1–2, Kennedy 1–0, Quinlan 1–0, Plunkett 0–2, Fahy 0–1.		Boggan 1–0, Breen 1–0, Reilly 1–0, Butler 0–2, Foley 0–1.

First round

12 May 1935 First round	Offaly	7–10 – 4-03	Kildare	O'Connor Park, Tullamore
	M Falvey 3–5, McCormack 3–1, Dunne 1–0, M Dooley 0–3, P Egan 0–1.		Kelly 2–0, McDonnell 1–2, Foley 1–1.

2 June 1935 First round	Laois	6–07 – 3-03	Meath	Cusack Park, Mullingar
	W Delaney 4–1, J Jones 1–1, P Wheeler 1–0, F Jones 0–2, J Lodge 0–2, P Flynn 0–1.		W Quinlan 1–0, J Fahy 1–0, P O'Dare 1–0, J Loughran 0–2, R Collins 0–1.	Referee: J Flaherty (Offaly)

Semi-finals

26 May 1935 Semi-final	Kilkenny	7–07 – 2-06	Offaly	O'Moore Park, Portlaoise
	L Byrne 3–0, M Power 2–1, M Kennedy 1–2, J Dunne 1–0, J Walsh 0–3, L Meagher 0–1.		M Falvey 1–3, J Dooley 1–1, D Shortt 0–1, D Rafter 0–1.	Referee: P Campion (Laois)

16 June 1935 Semi-final	Laois	5–01 – 3-07	Dublin	Geraldine Park, Athy
	W Delaney 1–0, M Cranny 1–0, J Jones 1–0, P Drennan 1–0, J Lodge 1–0, P Hennessy 0–1.		D O'Riordan 1–1, J O'Connell 1–1, J Carroll 1–0, C Tobin 0–2, T Treacy 0–2, T Teehan 0–1.

14 July 1935 Semi-final replay	Laois	3–05 – 2-06	Dublin	St. Brendan's Park, Birr
	A Nugent 2–0, P Farrell 1–1, M Hopper 0–2, P Hennessy 0–1, W Delaney 0–1.		S Tumpane 2–0, T Treacy 0–3, N Wade 0–1, C Tobin 0–1, O Caniffe 0–1.

Final

21 July 1935 Final	Laois	0–06 – 3-08	Kilkenny	O'Moore Park, Portlaoise
	P Hennessy 0–1, J Cashin 0–1, L Nugent 0–1, T Delaney 0–1, W Delaney 0–1, D Griffin 0–1.		L Byrne 1–1, P Phelan 1–0, J Dunne 1–0, J Walsh 0–2, M Power 0–1, M White 0–3, L Meagher 0–1.

Preliminary round
Meath	3–5
Wexford	3–3

First round
Offaly	7–10
Kildare	4–3
Laois	6–7
Meath	3–3

Semi-finals
Kilkenny	7–7
Offaly	2–6
Laois (R)	5–1; 5–5
Dublin (R)	3–7; 2–6

Leinster final
Kilkenny	3–8
Laois	0–6

=== Munster Senior Hurling Championship ===
First round

14 July 1935 First round	Cork	8–03 – 2-04	Clare	Gaelic Grounds, Limerick
	PJ Dorgan 3–0, T Kelly 1–2, D Cogan 1–0, M Brennan 1–0, J Quirke 2–0, G Garrett 0–1.		M Hennessy 1–1, B Loughnane 1–0, J Quirke 0–2, J Houlihan 0–1,.	Referee: W Gleeson (Limerick)

Semi-finals

7 July 1935 Semi-final	Tipperary	8–04 – 1-02	Waterford	Carrick-on-Suir
	M Kennedy 4–0, P Ryan 2–3, J Heaney 1–0, Cronin 1–0, T Kennedy 0–1.		M Fardy 1–0, H Fardy 0–1, Sheehan 0–1.	Referee: T Daly (Clare)

28 July 1935 Semi-final	Limerick	3–12 – 2-03	Cork	Thurles Sportsfield, Thurles
	M Mackey 1–5, P McMahon 1–2, J O'Connell 1–1, J Close 0–3, P Clohessy 0–1.		M Brennan 2–0, G Garrett 0–1, D Barry-Murphy 0–1, J Quirke 0–1.	Referee: S Kennedy (Tipperary)

Final

11 August 1935 Final	Limerick	5–05 – 1-04	Tipperary	Cork Athletic Grounds, Cork
	P Clohessy 2–0, J Close 1–2, M Mackey 1–1, P McMahon 1–0, M Cross 0–1, M Ryan 0–1.		T Kennedy 1–0, S Gilmartin 0–2, B O'Donnell 0–2.

First round
Cork	8–3
Clare	2–4

Semi-finals
Limerick	3–12
Cork	2–3
Tipperary	8–4
Waterford	1–2

Munster final
Limerick	5–5
Tipperary	1–4

== All-Ireland Senior Hurling Championship ==
=== All-Ireland semi-finals ===
4 August 1935 Semi-final	Galway	1–08 – 6–10	Kilkenny	St. Brendan's Park, Birr
	M Healy 1–0, M Gill 0–2, M King 0–2, J Deely 0–1, W Hanniffy 0–1, R Donohue 0–1, M Brennan 0–1,		M Power 3–1, L Byrne 2–1, M White 1–1, L Meagher 0–4, J Walsh 0–2, J Duggan 0–1.	Referee: S Kennedy (Tipperary)

=== All-Ireland final ===
1 September 1935 Final	Limerick	2–04 – 2-05	Kilkenny	Croke Park, Dublin
	M Mackey 1–2, P McMahon 1–0, J Close 0–1, M Cross 0–1.		M White 2–0, J Walsh 0–2, M Power 0–1, J Dunne 0–1, L Meagher 0–1.	Attendance: 46,591; Referee: T Daly (Clare)

== Championship statistics ==
=== Top scorers ===
Top scorers overall

Rank	Player	Club	Tally	Total	Matches	Average
1	Locky Byrne	Kilkenny	6-02	20	4	5.00
1	Mick Falvey	Offaly	4-08	20	2	10.00
2	Matty Power	Kilkenny	5-04	19	4	4.75
3	Willie Delaney	Laois	5-03	18	4	4.50
4	Mick Mackey	Limerick	3-08	17	3	5.66
5	Martin White	Kilkenny	3-04	13	4	3.25

Top scorers in a single game

Rank	Player	Club	Tally	Total	Opposition
1	Mick Falvey	Offaly	3-05	14	Kildare
2	Willie Delaney	Laois	4-01	13	Meath
3	Martin Kennedy	Tipperary	4-00	12	Waterford
4	J. J. McCormack	Offaly	3-01	10	Kildare
4	Matty Power	Kilkenny	3-01	10	Galway
5	Locky Byrne	Kilkenny	3-00	9	Offaly
5	P. J. Dorgan	Cork	3-00	9	Clare
5	Paddy Ryan	Tipperary	2-03	9	Waterford
6	Mick Mackey	Limerick	1-05	8	Cork
7	Matty Power	Kilkenny	2-01	7	Offaly
7	Locky Byrne	Kilkenny	2-01	7	Galway

=== Miscellaneous ===
- Kilkenny won their 11th All-Ireland title to draw level with Cork and Tipperary at the top of the all-time roll of honour. It was the first time that "the big three" shared the title of roll of honour leaders.

== Sources ==
- Corry, Eoghan, The GAA Book of Lists (Hodder Headline Ireland, 2005).
- Donegan, Des, The Complete Handbook of Gaelic Games (DBA Publications Limited, 2005).
