= MMG =

MMG may refer to:

- Maddy Makes Games, video game development studio
- Maybach Music Group, record label founded by rapper Rick Ross
- MBC Media Group, a television and radio network in the Philippines
- Mechanomyogram or mechanomyography, (measuring the) mechanical signal observable from the surface of a muscle when the muscle is contracted
- Medium machine gun, a category of firearm
- Mello Music Group, a hip hop record label in Arizona
- Mick McGinley, Gaelic footballer whose son Paul is the professional golfer
- MMG Limited, a Chinese-Australian mining company
- MMG (YouTuber), American YouTuber
- Mosley Music Group, a record label created by Timbaland
- Motor City Machine Guns, a professional wrestling tag team
- Mount Magnet Airport, IATA airport code "MMG"

== See also ==
- Motor Machine Gun Service (MMGS), a British Army unit in the First World War that used motorcycle/sidecar combinations equipped with machine guns
