= 1922 All-Ireland Senior Hurling Championship final =

1922 All-Ireland Senior Hurling Final
- Event: 1922 All-Ireland Senior Hurling Championship
| Kilkenny | Tipperary |
| 4-2 | 2-6 |
- Date: 9 September 1923
- Venue: Croke Park, Dublin
- Referee: Pat Dunphy (Laois)
- Attendance: 26,119

The 1922 All-Ireland Senior Hurling Championship Final was the 35th All-Ireland Final and the culmination of the 1922 All-Ireland Senior Hurling Championship, an inter-county hurling tournament for the top teams in Ireland. The match was held at Croke Park, Dublin, on 9 September 1923, between Kilkenny and Tipperary. The Munster champions lost to their Leinster opponents on a score line of 4–2 to 2–6.

Kilkenny would not beat Tipperary in the championship again until the All-Ireland final of 1967.

== Match details ==
1923-09-09

| Kilkenny | 4-2 – 2-6 | Tipperary |

Croke Park, Dublin
Attendance: 26,119
Referee: P. Dunphy (Laois)

| Kilkenny | Tipperary |

== Order of Scoring ==
1922 All Ireland Senior Hurling Final Scoring Order
| Half | Minute | Winner | Score | Runner up | Score | SD | Scorer | Note |
|---|---|---|---|---|---|---|---|---|
| 1 | 3 | Kilkenny | 0-00 | Tipperary | 0-01 | -1 | John or Jack Cleary |
| 1 | 9 | Kilkenny | 0-00 | Tipperary | 0-02 | -2 | John Joe Hayes |
| 1 | 11 | Kilkenny | 0-00 | Tipperary | 0-03 | -3 | John Joe Hayes |
| 1 | 15 | Kilkenny | 1-00 | Tipperary | 0-03 | 0 | John Joe Hayes |
| 1 | 19 | Kilkenny | 1-00 | Tipperary | 0-04 | -1 | John Joe Hayes | f |
| 1 | 20 | Kilkenny | 1-01 | Tipperary | 0-04 | 0 | Martin Lawlor |
| Half | Minute | Winner | Score | Runner up | Score | SD | Scorer | Note |
| 2 | 10 | Kilkenny | 1-01 | Tipperary | 1-04 | -3 | Jack or Paddy Power |
| 2 | 12 | Kilkenny | 1-01 | Tipperary | 1-05 | -4 | John Joe Hayes | f |
| 2 | 15 | Kilkenny | 1-02 | Tipperary | 1-05 | -3 | John Roberts |
| 2 | 21 | Kilkenny | 2-02 | Tipperary | 1-05 | 0 | Dick Grace | 65 |
| 2 | 24 | Kilkenny | 2-02 | Tipperary | 2-05 | -3 | Paddy Power |
| 2 | 27 | Kilkenny | 3-02 | Tipperary | 2-05 | 0 |
| 2 | 29 | Kilkenny | 4-02 | Tipperary | 2-05 | +3 |
| 2 | 30 | Kilkenny | 4-02 | Tipperary | 2-06 | +2 |

== Miscellaneous ==
- Along with the 1932 final, it is the only senior hurling final match where the teams were level longer than either team led during the game.
- Tipperary led four separate times during the match. This was the most by a losing team up to that point and was not equalled until the 1972 final.
- Kilkenny only led for two minutes, which is the shortest length of time for any winning team in an All Ireland senior hurling final.
