= 1967 All-Ireland Senior Hurling Championship final =

1967 All-Ireland Senior Hurling Final
- Event: 1967 All-Ireland Senior Hurling Championship
| Kilkenny | Tipperary |
| 3-8 | 2-7 |
- Date: 3 September 1967
- Venue: Croke Park, Dublin
- Referee: M. Hayes (Clare)
- Attendance: 64,246

The 1967 All-Ireland Senior Hurling Championship Final was the 80th All-Ireland Final and the culmination of the 1967 All-Ireland Senior Hurling Championship, an inter-county hurling tournament for the top teams in Ireland. The match was held at Croke Park, Dublin, on 3 September 1967, between Kilkenny and Tipperary. The Munster champions lost to their Leinster opponents on a score line of 3-8 to 2-7.

The match is notable as it was Kilkenny's first defeat of Tipperary in the championship since the All-Ireland final of 1922.

== Match details ==
1967-09-03
15:15 UTC+1

| Kilkenny | 3-8 – 2-7 | Tipperary |

Croke Park, Dublin
Attendance: 64,241
Referee: M. Hayes (Clare)

| Kilkenny | Tipperary |
