= Locky Byrne =

Kilkenny and Waterford hurler

Personal information
- Native name: Séamus Ó Broin (Irish)
- Nickname: Locky
- Born: 28 April 1913 Waterford, Ireland
- Died: 18 January 1941 (aged 27) Dublin, Ireland
- Occupation: Carpenter

Sport
- Sport: Hurling
- Position: Full-forward
Club
- Years: Club
- Mount Sion
Inter-county
- Years: County
- 1931–1941 1934–1938: Waterford; Kilkenny
Inter-county titles
- Munster titles: 1
- All-Irelands: 1
- NHL: 0

James Loughlin "Locky" Byrne (28 April 1913 – 18 January 1941) was an Irish hurler who played as a full-forward at senior level for the Kilkenny and Waterford county teams.

Born in Waterford, Byrne first arrived on the inter-county scene at the age of fifteen when he first linked up with the Waterford minor team, before later joining the senior side. He made his senior debut during the 1931 championship. Byrne immediately became a regular member of the starting fifteen, before later playing with Kilkenny, and won one All-Ireland medal, one Leinster medal and one Munster medal. He was an All-Ireland runner-up on two occasions.

As a member of the Munster and Leinster inter-provincial teams on a number of occasions, Byrne won one Railway Cup medal. At club level he played with Ferrybank, Slieverue, Mooncoin and Mount Sion, winning several championship medals.

== Biography ==
Loughlin Byrne was born in the Glen area of Waterford in 1913. The son of a railyard worker called James "Dashy" Byrne, he was raised in Ferrybank on the Waterford-Kilkenny border.

== Playing career ==
=== Club ===
Byrne played his club hurling with a number of clubs in both Waterford and Kilkenny. As a player with Ferrybank, in 1928, he won a minor Waterford Minor Hurling Championship title. Byrne later joined the Mooncoin GAA club in Kilkenny. Here he captured a senior Kilkenny Senior Hurling Championship in 1936. He also lined out with Slieverue during this period. Byrne later joined the Mount Sion GAA club in Waterford city and shared in some of that club's victories. He won his first senior Waterford Senior Hurling Championship with Mount Sion in 1938. It was the first of three consecutive county titles as Byrne collected two more county medals in 1939 and 1940.

=== Inter-county ===
Byrne first joined the Waterford minor hurling team in the late 1920s. He was only fifteen years-old when he won a Munster Minor Hurling Championship title in 1929 following a 7-5 to 0-2 thrashing of Tipperary. Waterford later qualified for the All-Ireland final where Meath provided the opposition. Waterford won by 5-0 to 1-1 giving Byrne an All-Ireland Minor Hurling Championship medal.

Byrne was later drafted onto the Waterford senior hurling panel. He was only seventeen when he played in the 1931 Munster final with Cork providing the opposition. In eight minutes of injury time, Cork scored an equalising point and the game ended in a draw. The replay was more conclusive as Cork won by 5-4 to 1-2, ending Waterford's championship campaign.

By the mid-1930s Byrne had crossed the border and was playing with the Kilkenny senior inter-county team. He played in the Leinster decider of 1934; however, Dublin were the winners on that occasion. The following year Byrne was still on the team as Kilkenny defeated Laois to take the Leinster title. Byrne later lined out in his first All-Ireland final at senior level. Limerick provided the opposition on that occasion and were favourites to win. They were the reigning National League and All-Ireland champions and had played a remarkable 31 games without defeat. A record crowd of over 46,000 turned up to watch the game. At the beginning of the second-half Lory Meagher sent over a huge point from midfield giving Kilkenny a lead which they wouldn't surrender. As a result of this victory, Byrne collected an All-Ireland Senior Hurling Championship medal.

By 1938 Byrne was back on the Waterford senior team. That year his side reached the Munster final with Clare providing the opposition. In a close game Waterford emerged as the victors on a score line of 3-5 to 2-5. Not only was it Byrne's first Munster Senior Hurling Championship medal, but it was also the first time that Waterford had won the provincial title. Waterford later accounted for Galway allowing Byrne's side to advance to their first-ever All-Ireland final. Dublin provided the opposition on that occasion. Declan Goode scored a goal for the Decies after just six minutes, however, Dublin fought back with goals of their own. Eventually, victory went to Dublin on a score line of 2-5 to 1-6.

== Death ==
In 1940 Byrne got injured playing a club match against Portlaw and came off with a coat wrapped around himself. He sat in the wet grass on the sideline for the remainder of the game and, as a result, contracted tuberculosis. His health steadily declined over the next few months and on 19 January 1941 he died in a Dublin hospital. He was twenty-seven years old.
