= Patrick 'Pakey' O'Mahony =

Irish boxer and hurling trainer

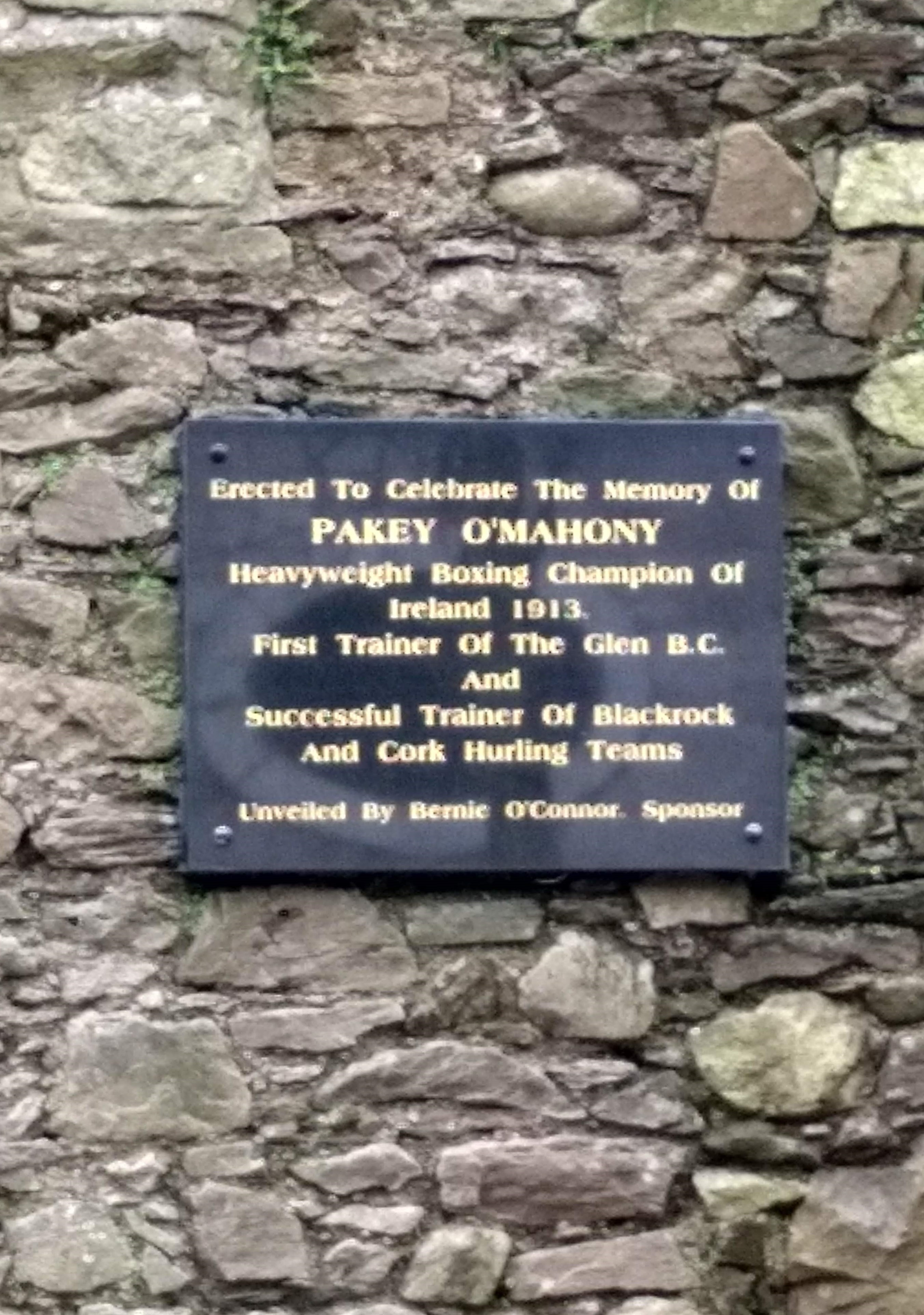
Plaque commemorating Patrick O'Mahony, Bishop Lucy Park, Cork City, Ireland

Patrick 'Pakey' O'Mahony (1880–1968) alias "Packey Mahoney", was an Irish boxer and hurling trainer. He won the Irish heavyweight championship in 1912. His professional boxing career saw him win his first fourteen fights; he lost (and retired after) his fifteenth fight, a contest with Bombardier Billy Wells on 30 June 1913. He was the first trainer of the Glen Boxing Club.

With his background in boxing training O'Mahony was asked to come into the Blackrock Hurling Club set-up as a trainer (in this era, GAA panels were prepared for matches by a trainer and then the team was picked by a selection panel). After a successful stint with the Rockies, O'Mahony was asked to train the Cork county hurling team. He (and his assistant Jim Barry) trained the county to All-Ireland titles in 1926 and 1928.
