= Jim Barry =

Irish hurler (1893–1968)

Jim "Tough" Barry (26 July 1893 – 17 October 1968) was an Irish hurling and football trainer. In a career that lasted for forty years from 1926 until 1966 he trained the Cork hurling team to thirteen All-Ireland titles (trainer for 11 and assistant trainer for 2). He also trained the Limerick hurling team and the Cork football team to All Ireland success.

== Early life ==
James Barry, son of John and Mary (née Lynch), was born in the Lying-in Hospital in Cork on 31 July 1893. James’ parents already had three children when he was born; they would go on to have eight children in total, of whom six (four girls and two boys) would survive the high child mortality of the time. The Barry family lived on Grattan Street in 1893 but later moved to nearby Penrose Square. Following the profession of his father, James started working as a tailor when he left school. James had a love of music, especially opera and had an excellent tenor voice. He was also a keen sportsman; he was Irish Springboard champion for four years and earned his nickname 'Tough' as a result of his boxing career during which he fought as a Bantamweight. James Barry became involved in the Irish War of Independence 1919 - 1921 and was arrested and imprisoned. He was held at Spike Island, Cork Harbour, as well as Bere Island in Cork, before being released in December 1921.

== Gaelic games ==
In 1926, Jim Barry was brought into the Cork hurling set-up as a physical trainer and assistant to Patrick 'Pakey' O'Mahony. It was his success in swimming and boxing that got him the role (Mahony was also a boxer) and not any background in hurling (he had hurled with Blackrock as a young man but was not of inter-county standard; Jack Lynch later said "Not only did he not play but I also wouldn’t ascribe to Jim a very in-depth knowledge of all the aspects of hurling").

Barry helped guide Cork to League and Championship success in his first year. Another victory followed in 1928 so when Pakey Mahony left the set-up Barry continued on without him. Barry had immediate success in 1929, and another league was won in 1930.

Barry's Cork team won the All-Ireland again in 1931. When Cork were knocked out of the championship in 1934, he was asked to train Limerick, they won the League and the All-Ireland. His Cork team lost to Kilkenny in the 1939 All Ireland final and won the league in 1940.

Barry became the first manager to win four All-Ireland titles in a row from 1941 to 1944 (the first year also saw another league win). He trained the Cork county football team to All-Ireland victory in 1945 and also refereed that year's Minor Hurling final. His Cork side beat Kilkenny in the 1946 All Ireland final but were beaten by the cats the following year. Cork won the League again in 1948.

Barry's Cork returned for another run of multiple All-Ireland's, a three-in-a-row, from 1952-1954 (the middle year also saw another league won). There was then a barren period for 12 years before Cork returned with a shock victory over old rivals Kilkenny in the 1966 final. It was after this final that Barry said, "In Cork, hurlers come up overnight like mushrooms". Tough Barry suffered a stroke in October 1968 and died in the South Infirmary a few days later.

=== Management style ===
Barry came into the Cork set-up as a physical trainer (after earlier success in swimming and boxing) but with time took on more and more responsibility. He is credited with bringing a forward-thinking and holistic approach to player preparation. He often visited workplaces to talk to employers on behalf of his players, demanded proper meals for his squads after matches, and was renowned for his ability to have them perfectly pitched for the biggest games. Jack Lynch later said, "He had a tremendous ability to bring out the best in the team he was training. He used to do everything. When the training session started, he would go down to the Park to make sure the grass was cut. If it wasn’t he would kick up holy murder! He’d make sure the jerseys were washed and the towels were washed. After matches, win or lose, he’d always make sure that the team were sitting down to a good meal and he wouldn’t let anybody interfere."

In this era, GAA panels were prepared for matches by a trainer and the team was picked by a selection panel. With time however, his opinions on selection gained considerable weight.

When asked about his own modest hurling career he would reply "You don’t have to be a greyhound to train greyhounds".
