= 1931 All-Ireland Senior Hurling Championship final =

1931 All-Ireland Senior Hurling Final
- Event: 1931 All-Ireland Senior Hurling Championship
Cork	Kilkenny
1-6 2-5 5-8	1-6 2-5 3-4
- Date: 6 September 1931; 11 October 1931 (replay); 1 November 1931 (2nd replay)
- Venue: Croke Park, Dublin
- Referee: Seán Robbins (Offaly); Seán Robbins (Offaly) (replay); Willie Walsh (Waterford) (2nd replay)
- Attendance: 26,460; 33,124 (replay); 31,935 (2nd replay)

The first 1931 All-Ireland Senior Hurling Championship Final took place on 6 September 1931 at Croke Park, Dublin. It was the 44th All-Ireland final and was contested by Cork and Kilkenny. The match ended in a 1-5 apiece draw. The replay took place at the same venue five weeks later on 11 October 1931. Once again, the sides finished level with both scoring 2-5. An unprecedented second replay took place on 1 November 1931. On that occasion the Leinster champions lost to their Munster opponents on a score line of 5-8 to 3-4.

== Match details ==
=== First game ===
1931-09-06
15:15 UTC+1

Cork	1-6 – 1-6	Kilkenny

Croke Park, Dublin
Attendance: 26,460
Referee: S. Robbins (Offaly)

MATCH RULES

- 60 minutes.
- Replay if scores level.
- Three named substitutes

=== Replay ===
1931-10-11
15:15 UTC+1

Cork	2-5 – 2-5	Kilkenny

Croke Park, Dublin
Attendance: 33,124
Referee: S. Robbins (Offaly)

MATCH RULES

- 60 minutes.
- Replay if scores level.
- Three named substitutes

=== Second replay ===
1931-11-01
15:15 UTC+1

Cork	5-8 – 3-4	Kilkenny

Croke Park, Dublin
Attendance: 31,935
Referee: Willie Walsh (Waterford)

MATCH RULES

- 60 minutes.
- Replay if scores level.
- Three named substitutes

Cork Team 1 John Ballyhea Coughlan 2 Morgan Madden 3 Edward Marie O'Connell 4 Paddy Fox Collins 5 Jim O'Regan 6 Dinny Barry Murphy 7 Tom Barry 8 Jim Hurley 9 Mick O'Connell 10 Michael Gah Ahern 11 Eugene Eudie Coughlan 12 Paddy Delea 13 Paddy Balty Ahern 14 Peter Hawker O'Grady 15 Willie Clancy Substitute George Garrett Trainer Jim Tough Barry
