= Hendrik Isam Mahar =

Indonesian army officer

- Born: 24 November 1928; Kasongan, Katingan, West Kalimantan, Kalimantan, Dutch East Indies
- Died: 12 January 1990 (aged 61); Jakarta, Indonesia
- Spouse: Katibah Noor
- Children: 5
- Relatives: Tjilik Riwut (uncle)
- Military career
- Allegiance: Indonesia
- Branch: Indonesian Army
- Rank: Brigadier general
- Unit: Kopassus

Hendrik Isam Mahar (24 November 1928 – 12 January 1990) was an Indonesian Army officer from the Special Forces Command who spearheaded the suppression of the communist insurgency in Sarawak.

Hendrik Isam Mahar was born November 20, 1942, in Kasongan, the capital of Katingan Regency, to Isam Mahar and Imik. The fourth of six children in a Christian family, he has a sister named Tagiana and Ecen and four brothers, Fransiul, Yelbu Mahat, Siberson, and Ukat. Both Isam Mahar and Imik were of Dayak descent.

In 1966, Isam, who at that time was a colonel and stationed in the Udayana Regional Military Command in Bali, was summoned by A. J. Witono to West Kalimantan. Witono, the military commander in West Kalimantan, ordered Isam to led an intelligence operation to quell the North Kalimantan Communist Party rebel. Witono chose Isam as the leader of the operation due to Ishak's Dayak ethnicity. As West Kalimantan is majority Dayak majority, Witono hoped that the Dayaks would support the operation.

Following his appointment as the leader of the operation, his uncle, Tjilik Riwut, who at that time was the Governor of Central Kalimantan, contacted Oevaang Oeray, the Governor of West Kalimantan, and requested him to assist Isam in the operation. A declaration of war against the North Kalimantan Communist Party was announced in the Indonesian state radio on behalf of Oevaang on 21 August 1967.

The operation commenced after the assassination of Sayid Ahmad Sofyan, the leader of the party, on 12 January 1974. Isam was promoted to brigadier general shortly after and retired from the military. He then became an entrepreneur and opened up businesses in West Kalimantan.

Isam died on 12 January 1990 in Jakarta.

Isam was married to Katibah Noor. The marriage resulted in five children.
