= Big Three (hurling) =

In hurling, the term "Big Three" (Irish: An Triúr Mór) refers to the hurling county teams of Cork, Kilkenny and Tipperary.

Historically, these three counties have dominated the sport. Together, they have won 95 out of 138 of the All-Ireland Senior Hurling Championships (68.8%) and 53 of 96 (55.2%) National Hurling Leagues.

== Results ==
Accurate to 12 April 2026.

County team	All-Ireland	Munster	Leinster	League
Kilkenny	36	—N/a	77	19
Cork	30	55	—N/a	15
Tipperary	29	42	—N/a	19
All other counties	43	41	60	43

== See also ==
- Cork–Kilkenny hurling rivalry
- Cork–Tipperary hurling rivalry
- Kilkenny–Tipperary hurling rivalry
