= Eddie Gleeson =

Irish hurler

Personal information
- Native name: Éamonn Ó Gliasáin (Irish)
- Born: 1920 Thurles, County Tipperary, Ireland

Sport
- Sport: Hurling
- Position: Left corner-forward
Club
- Years: Club
- 1930s-1950s: Thurles Sarsfields
Inter-county
- Years: County
- 1945-1946: Tipperary
Inter-county titles
- Munster titles: 1
- All-Irelands: 1
- NHL: 0

Edward Gleeson (born 1920, date of death unknown) was an Irish hurler who played as a left corner-forward for the Tipperary senior team.

Gleeson made his first appearance for the team during the 1945 championship and was a regular member of the starting fifteen for just two full seasons. During that time he won one All-Ireland medal and one Munster medal. At club level Gleeson played with Thurles Sarsfields.
