= Frank Meagher =

Irish hurler

Personal information
- Native name: Prionsias Ó Meachair (Irish)
- Born: 1897 Tullaroan, County Kilkenny, Ireland
- Occupation: Priest

Sport
- Sport: Hurling
Club
- Years: Club
- 1916-1920: Tullaroan
Club titles
- Kilkenny titles: 0
Inter-county
- Years: County
- 1917-1920: Kilkenny
Inter-county titles
- Leinster titles: 0
- All-Irelands: 0

Francis Meagher (born 1897) was an Irish hurler who played as a right corner-back for the Kilkenny senior team.

Meagher made his first appearance for the team during the 1917 championship and was a regular member of the starting fifteen until his retirement after the 1920 championship. During that time, he failed to secure either All-Ireland or Leinster winners' medals.

Meagher enjoyed a brief club career with Tullaroan. However, he failed to win a county championship medals.

Meagher was a member of a famous Gaelic games dynasty. His father, Henry J. Meagher, was said to have attended the inaugural meeting of the Gaelic Athletic Association in 1884. His brothers, Willie and Henry, both played with Kilkenny throughout the 1920s, while a third brother, Lory, won 8 Leinster and 3 All-Ireland titles in the 1920s and 30s.
