= Willie Meagher =

Irish hurler

Personal information
- Native name: Liam Ó Meachair (Irish)
- Born: 30 August 1895 Tullaroan, County Kilkenny, Ireland
- Died: 19 June 1957 (aged 61) Kilkenny, Ireland

Sport
- Sport: Hurling
Club
- Years: Club
- 1915-1930: Tullaroan
Club titles
- Kilkenny titles: 4
Inter-county
- Years: County
- 1918-1927: Kilkenny
Inter-county titles
- Leinster titles: 2
- All-Irelands: 0
- NHL: 0

William Joseph Meagher (30 August 1895 – 19 June 1957) was an Irish hurler who played as a right corner-back for the Kilkenny senior team.

Meagher made his first appearance for the team during the 1918 championship and was a regular player for much of the next decade. During that time, he won two Leinster medals. However, an All-Ireland winners' medal eluded him.

Meagher enjoyed a successful club career with Tullaroan, winning four county championship medals.

Meagher was a member of a famous Gaelic games dynasty. His father, Henry J. Meagher, was said to have attended the inaugural meeting of the Gaelic Athletic Association in 1884. His brothers, Frank and Henry, both played with Kilkenny throughout the 1920s while a third brother, Lory, won 8 Leinster and 3 All-Ireland titles in the 1920s and 30s.
