= Henry Meagher =

Irish hurler

Personal information
- Native name: Pádraig Ó Meachair (Irish)
- Born: 6 October 1902 Tullaroan, County Kilkenny, Ireland
- Died: October 1982 (aged 80) United States

Sport
- Sport: Hurling
- Position: Full-forward
Club
- Years: Club
- 1922-1928: Tullaroan
Club titles
- Kilkenny titles: 1
Inter-county
- Years: County
- 1926-1927: Kilkenny
Inter-county titles
- Leinster titles: 2
- All-Irelands: 0
- NHL: 0

Henry Joseph Meagher (6 October 1902 – October 1982) was an Irish hurler who played as a full-forward for the Kilkenny senior team.

Meagher made his first appearance for the team during the 1926 championship and was a regular player for just two championship seasons. During that time, he won two Leinster winner's medals.

At club level, Meagher enjoyed a successful career with Tullaroan. However, he also lined out with arch-rivals Mooncoin, winning one county club championship winners' medal. He also won a Railway Cup winners' medal as a member of the inaugural Leinster inter-provincial team.

Meagher was a member of an extended Gaelic games dynasty. His father, Henry J. Meagher, was said to have attended the inaugural meeting of the Gaelic Athletic Association in 1884. His brothers, Frank and Willie, both played with Kilkenny throughout the 1920s while a third brother, Lory, won 8 Leinster and 3 All-Ireland titles in the 1920s and 30s.
