= John Roberts (hurler) =

Irish hurler and sports administrator

Personal information
- Native name: Seán Mac Roibeaird (Irish)
- Born: 24 June 1895 Kilkenny, Ireland
- Died: 9 December 1987 (aged 92) Kilkenny, Ireland
- Occupation: Baker
- Height: 5 ft 8 in (173 cm)

Sport
- Sport: Hurling
- Position: Full-forward
Club
- Years: Club
- 1914–1930: Dicksboro
Club titles
- Kilkenny titles: 2
Inter-county
- Years: County
- 1917–1929: Kilkenny
Inter-county titles
- Leinster titles: 3
- All-Irelands: 1
- NHL: 0

John Roberts (24 June 1895 – 9 December 1987) was an Irish hurler, handballer, referee and Gaelic games administrator. His league and championship career at senior level with the Kilkenny county team spanned thirteen years from 1916 until 1929.

Born in Kilkenny, Roberts was educated at St John's Boys' School. He first played competitive hurling at the age of fourteen with the Dean Street Volunteers before joining the Dicksboro club in 1914. After winning county junior championship medals in 1914 and 1919, Roberts went on the captain the club at senior level. He won county senior championship medals in 1923 and 1926.

Roberts first came to prominence on the inter-county scene in 1916. After impressing in a trial game he became a regular member of the Kilkenny senior team the following year. Over the course of the following thirteen championship seasons, Roberts won one All-Ireland medal. He also won three Leinster medals and played his last game for Kilkenny in 1929.

As a member of the first Leinster inter-provincial team in 1927, Roberts won one Railway Cup medal in the inaugural year of the competition.

In retirement from playing, Roberts continued his involvement with the game as a referee and administrator. He refereed the 1928 All-Ireland final between Cork and Galway, as well as numerous county championship matches in Kilkenny and Wexford. Roberts was Kilkenny's representative on the Leinster Council from 1927 until 1942

== Honours ==
Kilkenny

- All-Ireland Senior Hurling Championship (1): 1922
- Munster Senior Hurling Championship (3): 1922, 1923, 1926

Sporting positions
Preceded by Dick Grace	Kilkenny Senior Hurling Captain; 1922	Succeeded by Wattie Dunphy
Preceded by Dick Grace	Kilkenny Senior Hurling Captain; 1927	Succeeded by
