= MMG (YouTuber) =

American YouTuber (born 1998)

- Meagher in 2026
- Born: Matthew Meagher; May 4, 1998 (age 28)
- Education: Michigan State University
- Occupation: YouTuber

YouTube information
- Channel: MMG
- Years active: 2015–present
- Genres: Gaming; vlog
- Subscribers: 3.21 million
- Views: 2.2 billion
- Last updated: June 7, 2026

Matthew Meagher (born May 4, 1998), known online as MMG or Meags, is an American YouTuber who specializes in American Football content. He makes Madden NFL and EA Sports College Football videos. He has gained over 4.3 million subscribers and 2.2 billion views across his three channels.

== Early life ==
Meagher grew up in DeWitt, Michigan. He began playing the Madden NFL video game series when he was about nine years old. He attended DeWitt High School, where he played basketball, football, and track. He was a kicker in football, twice being named to the Lansing State Journal dream team and earning an all-state honorable mention in his senior year in 2015. He then went to Michigan State University, where he graduated in 2020. He majored in marketing and was president of the school's Psi Upsilon fraternity..

== Online career ==
Meagher began posting Madden NFL videos to YouTube as a high school junior in 2015. His early videos featured the Madden Ultimate Team (MUT) deck-building gamemode. He later changed his focus to Madden NFL gameplay during his sophomore year of college. His videos gained popularity for showcasing his unfiltered and animated personality, which sometimes got them demonetized. Episodes in his trademark "Wheel of MUT" series included random spins to determine which players to add to his team.

Meagher's channel reached 1 million subscribers in early 2019. Following the release of Madden NFL 20, his average viewership multiplied and he had 1.5 million subscribers by the start of 2020. He later branched into the EA Sports College Football series. Outside of video games, he has made vlogs about his life and sports events. He ran a second channel, MMG Live, from 2021 to 2024. He started a third channel, Meags, in 2022.
