= Matty Power =

Irish hurler

Personal information
- Native name: Maitiú de Paor (Irish)
- Born: 18 October 1899 Graiguenamanagh, County Kilkenny, Ireland
- Died: 7 October 1965 (aged 65) Rathgar, Dublin, Ireland
- Occupation: Garda

Sport
- Sport: Hurling
- Position: Left corner-forward
Clubs
- Years: Club
- Dicksboro; Garda
Club titles
- Dublin titles: 6
Inter-county
Years	County	Apps (scores)
1920-1937 1926-1930	Kilkenny; Dublin	41 (35-28); 11 (11-10)
Inter-county titles
- Leinster titles: 12
- All-Irelands: 5
- NHL: 2

Matthew "Matty" Power (18 October 1899 – 7 October 1965) was an Irish sportsperson. He played hurling at various times with his local clubs Dicksboro and Garda. Power was also a member of the Kilkenny and Dublin senior inter-county team in the 1920s and 1930s.

== Biography ==
Matty Power was born in Graiguenamanagh, County Kilkenny in 1899. He was educated locally and later trained as a member of the Garda Síochána before moving to Dublin where he worked as a guard. Together with his wife, Nancy Walsh (1916–2003), they also ran a boarding house at Gardiner Place called Kilkenny House.

Matty Power died from lung cancer in 1965.

== Playing career ==
=== Club ===
Power played his club hurling with his local Dicksboro club just outside Kilkenny. He won a senior county title with the club in 1923. Power later moved to Dublin where he played with the famous Garda club in the city. Here he collected five senior county titles in-a-row from 1925 until 1929. Power won a seventh county title in 1931.

=== Inter-county ===
Power first came to prominence on the inter-county scene as a member of the Kilkenny senior inter-county team in the early 1920s. He won his first Leinster title in 1922 following an eight-point victory over Dublin. This victory allowed Kilkenny to advance to the All-Ireland final where Tipperary were the opponents. With three minutes left in the game Tipp were leading by three points, however, last-minute goals by Paddy Donoghue and Dick Tobin secured a 4–2 to 2–6 victory for Kilkenny. Power had captured his first All-Ireland Senior Hurling Championship medal. He added a second Leinster title to his collection in 1923 following another win over Dublin, however, Galway accounted for Power's side in the All-Ireland semi-final.

After moving to Dublin, Power was allowed to turn out for the Dublin senior hurling team. He won a third Leinster title in 1927 as Dublin defeated his own native-county on a score line of 7–7 to 4–6. In the subsequent All-Ireland final, Dublin faced Cork, the reigning All-Ireland champions. On a team composed of nine members of the Garda Síochána Dublin were in the lead at half-time, and Power collected his second All-Ireland medal as his side won by 4–8 to 1–3. In 1928, Power added a fourth provincial medal to his collection as Dublin defeated Offaly by 9–7 to 4–3. The subsequent All-Ireland semi-final saw the Leinster and Munster champions come face-to-face as Dublin took on Cork in a repeat of the previous All-Ireland final. On this occasion Cork defeated Power's side by 5- to 0–2. In 1929, Power collected a National Hurling League title with Dublin. Dublin were later defeated by Kilkenny in the Leinster final. The team bounced back in 1930 and defeated Laois by 5–7 to 2-2 giving Power a fifth Leinster title and passage to the All-Ireland final. Dublin faced Tipperary on that occasion, however, Power ended up on the losing side that day.

In 1931 Power availed of the newly introduced non-resident rule and declared for his own native-county of Kilkenny. That year he won a sixth Leinster title following a narrow win for Kilkenny over Laois. A defeat of Galway in the penultimate stage of the championship set up a championship decider with Cork. On that occasion both sides finished level on a score line of 1-6 apiece. One month later both teams returned to Croke Park to participate in the replay. Once again Cork took the lead at half-time, however, Kilkenny fought back, and both sides again finished level with 2-5 each. On 1 November, Cork and Kilkenny returned to Croke Park for the third time. Cork went on to win the game by 5–8 to 3–4. In 1932, Kilkenny were back and Power collected a seventh Leinster title following a victory over Dublin. The subsequent All-Ireland final saw Power's side take on Clare. It was the first ever meeting of these two teams in the history of the championship. In a close match, Kilkenny took the lead thanks to goals by Power, Lory Meagher and Martin White. Clare fought back, however, Kilkenny hung on to win the game by 3–3 to 2-3 giving Power a third All-Ireland medal. Kilkenny retained their provincial dominance in 1933 with a defeat of Dublin giving Power an eighth Leinster medal. A defeat of Galway in the next game set up an All-Ireland final meeting with Limerick. In another tight game Kilkenny sealed the victory with a 1–7 to 0–6 score line giving Power his fourth All-Ireland title, Kilkenny lost their provincial title in 1934, however, Power won a ninth Leinster medal in 1935. The All-Ireland final saw Kilkenny take on Limerick for the second time in three years. Once again the match was a close one, however, Kilkenny clung on and won by a single point – 2–5 to 2–4. It was Power's fifth victory in an All-Ireland final. At this he was thirty-six years old and most players would contemplate retirement. Power, however, decided to play on, a decision which paid off in 1936 as he collected a tenth Leinster title before lining out in yet another All-Ireland final. Kilkenny and Limerick were paired together in the championship decider. Limerick won on a score line of 5–6 to 1–5. Power remained on the team and collected an eleventh Leinster title in 1937. The All-Ireland final saw Kilkenny take on Tipperary, however, Kilkenny were heavily defeated by 3–11 to 0–3. Following this defeat Power decided to retire from inter-county hurling.

=== Province ===
Power also lined out with Leinster in the inter-provincial hurling competition. He won his first Railway Cup medal in 1927 as Leinster defeated Munster in the inaugural year of the competition. Power's side were defeated by Munster for the next four years, however, he added another two Railway Cup medals to his collection in 1932 and 1933. He won a fourth and final title in 1936.

== Honours ==
Kilkenny & Dublin

- All-Ireland Senior Hurling Championship (5): 1922, 1927, 1932, 1933, 1935
- Leinster Senior Hurling Championship (12): 1922, 1923, 1925, 1926, 1927, 1930, 1931, 1932, 1933, 1935, 1936, 1937
- National Hurling League (2): 1929, 1933

Leinster

- Railway Cup (4): 1927, 1932, 1933, 1936
