= Martin White (hurler) =

Irish hurler

Personal information
- Native name: Máirtín de Faoite (Irish)
- Born: 31 July 1909 Tullaroan, County Kilkenny, Ireland
- Died: 12 October 2011 (aged 102) Glasnevin, County Dublin, Ireland
- Occupations: Butcher, baker

Sport
- Sport: Hurling
- Position: Centre-forward
Clubs
- Years: Club
- 1929–1938 1939–1948: Tullaroan; Blackrock
Club titles
- Kilkenny titles: 3
Inter-county
- Years: County
- 1931–1938: Kilkenny
Inter-county titles
- Leinster titles: 3
- All-Irelands: 3
- NHL: 0
- All Stars: 1

Martin White (31 July 1909 – 12 October 2011) was an Irish hurler who played as a centre-forward for the Kilkenny senior team.

White made his first appearance for the team during the 1931 championship and became a regular member of the team until his retirement following the conclusion of the 1938 championship. During that time he won three All-Ireland winner's medals and three Leinster winner's medals.

At club level White enjoyed lengthy careers with Tullaroan in Kilkenny and with Blackrock in Cork. He won three county club championship winners' medals with the former.

Until his death White was the oldest living senior All-Ireland medal winner.

== Biography ==
White was born in Lacken near Tullaroan, County Kilkenny, in 1909. One of a family of fourteen he was educated locally at Bonnettstown national school before later attending St. James's CBS and St. Kieran's College, a hurling nursery for local talent. Following his secondary education White began working for Clover Meats in Waterford in 1929. After ten years as a butcher in the city he later moved to Cork. White moved to Dublin in 1948 where he became a baker.

White married his wife Peg Ryan in 1947; the couple had seven children. He died at Glasnevin, Dublin, aged 102, in 2011.

== Playing career ==
=== Club ===
White played his club hurling with the Tullaroan club and enjoyed much success. As a sixteen-year-old he played hurling with the club's junior team until he was promoted to senior status in 1929. In his second season on the club's senior team, Tullaroan qualified for the final of the county senior championship, with Urlingford providing the opposition. That game was a huge triumph for Tullaroan and White collected a county winners' medal following a 4–4 to 0–3 trouncing. After surrendering their title in 1931, Tullaroan were back in the county club championship decider again in 1933. Carrickshock were the opponents on that occasion and a high-scoring game developed. Eleven goals were scored in total, with White ending up on the winning side by 6–5 to 5–4. It was his second county winners' medal.

In 1934, Tullaroan set out to successfully defend their title. All went to plan as White's side reached the county final once again. For the second year in succession, Carrickshock provided the opposition, however, the result remained the same. White added a third county medal to his collection following a 6–6 to 1–5 trouncing. Tullaroan failed to make it three-in-a-row, however, White lined out in his fourth county championship decider in 1936. Mooncoin were the opponents and little separated the two sides. At the long whistle White's side were just about defeated by 4–2 to 4–1.

After moving to Cork White joined the Blackrock GAA club. He enjoyed little success here, as "the Rockies" were going through an uncharacteristic dry-spell.

=== Inter-county ===
White first came to prominence on the inter-county scene as a member of the Kilkenny senior inter-county team when he made his debut in 1931. After missing Kilkenny's 4–7 to 4–2 Leinster final defeat of Laois, he was named to start in the subsequent All-Ireland final against arch-rivals Cork. The game itself turned out to be a remarkable contest with both sides ending the game with 1–6 apiece. The replay took place one month later and proved to be just as exciting a contest as the first game.

White, however, was dropped for the replay. In spite of a great display by Lory Meagher a winner couldn't be found and both sides finished level again at 2–5 apiece. After this game officials pressed for extra time, however, Cork captain Eudie Coughlan rejected this. It was also suggested at a meeting of the GAA's Central Council that both counties be declared joint champions and that half an All-Ireland medal by given to each player. This motion was later defeated. As the All-Ireland saga went to a third meeting White was still confined to the bench. In spite of fielding a younger team, Kilkenny were defeated by Cork on a score line of 5–8 to 3–4.

White missed Kilkenny's successful defence of their provincial crown in 1932, however, he was included at full-forward for the All-Ireland final against Clare. It was both sides first ever meeting in the history of the championship. In a low-scoring but tense game Clare's Tull Considine scored two goals and was foiled for what would almost certainly have been a third. These goals were negated by Kilkenny's three goal-scoring heroes Matty Power, Lory Meagher, who scored a remarkable goal from a line ball, and White himself. The final score of 3–3 to 2–3 gave victory to Kilkenny and gave White an All-Ireland medal.

1933 saw White miss Kilkenny's third consecutive Leinster final triumph, however, in a similar pattern to recent years, he secured a place on the starting fifteen for the subsequent All-Ireland final. Limerick lined out against the Leinster champions on that occasion as just over 45,000 people turned up at Croke Park. Such was the crowd that the gates were locked five minutes before the game began and 5,000 people were locked out. The game was a close one; however, Kilkenny sealed the victory with a great solo-run goal by Johnny Dunne. A 1–7 to 0–6 win gave White his second consecutive All-Ireland medal.

Kilkenny were back in 1935 with White finally collecting a Leinster winners' medal on the field of play following his team's 3–8 to 0–6 defeat of Laois. Another All-Ireland final appearance beckoned with red-hot favourites Limerick providing the opposition once again. They were the reigning National Hurling League and All-Ireland champions and had played a remarkable thirty-one games without defeat. In spite of rain falling throughout the entire game both sides served up a great game. At the beginning of the second-half Lory Meagher sent over a huge point from midfield giving Kilkenny a lead which they wouldn't surrender. As a result of this victory White captured a third All-Ireland medal in four years.

By 1936 White had firmly established himself as a key member of the Kilkenny team. That year he was rewarded when he picked up a second Leinster winners' medal following a 4–6 to 2–5 defeat of Laois. Kilkenny later qualified for the All-Ireland final where Limerick provided the opposition for the third time in four years. On this occasion White's side were completely outclassed. Three more Limerick goals followed in the second half as Kilkenny were well beaten by 5–6 to 1–5. 1937 saw Kilkenny qualify for the Leinster final once again. Westmeath were accounted for on that occasion by a score line of 5–3 to 2–4 as White collected his third Leinster winners' medal.

The subsequent All-Ireland final was played in the unusual surroundings of FitzGerald Stadium in Killarney due to a builders strike at Croke Park. Tipperary were the opponents on that occasion and surprised Kilkenny with a tour de force. Lory Meagher came on as a substitute in the second half to score his team's only point of the half. Kilkenny collapsed as Tipp recorded a 3–11 to 0–3 victory in one of the most one-sided championship deciders ever. Butler Coffey, who died at the age of 101 in 2010, was the last surviving member of the Tipperary team that won the 1937 final, while Kilkenny full-forward that day, Martin White, was the last surviving player from either team from that final.

White played for the team again in 1938, however, Kilkenny were defeated in a replay of the provincial final. It was his last game.

=== Inter-provincial ===
White also lined out with Leinster in the inter-provincial hurling competition. He won his sole Railway Cup winners' medal as a non-playing substitute in 1936 when his province defeated Munster by 2–8 to 3–4.

== Honours ==
=== Tullaroan ===
- Kilkenny Senior Hurling Championship:
  - Winner (3): 1930, 1933, 1934
  - Runner-up (1): 1936

=== Kilkenny ===
- All-Ireland Senior Hurling Championship:
  - Winner (3): 1932, 1933, 1935
  - Runner-up (3): 1931, 1936, 1937
- Leinster Senior Hurling Championship:
  - Winner (3): 1935, 1936, 1937
  - Runner-up (2): 1934, 1938

=== Leinster ===
- Railway Cup:
  - Winner (1): 1936 (sub)
  - Runner-up (1): 1937

Awards
Preceded by Pat Stakelum (Tipperary)	GAA All-Time All-Star Award in Hurling; 1994	Succeeded by Discontinued
Achievements
Preceded by Jim Power	Oldest living All-Ireland medal winner 1998-2011	Succeeded by Tommy Cooke
