= William F. Mahar Jr. =

American politician (born 1947)

William Francis Mahar, Jr. (born February 13, 1947) is an American politician.

Born in Chicago Heights, Illinois, Mahar served in the United States Army from 1970 to 1972. He received his bachelor's degree in psychology from Southern Illinois University and his master's degree in personnel services from Purdue University. He lived in Homewood, Illinois and served on the Homewood village board.

Mahar served in the Illinois Senate from 1985 to 2003 and was a Republican. His father William F. Mahar Sr. also served in the Illinois General Assembly.
