= William F. Mahar Sr. =

American politician (1919–2006)

Member of the Illinois Senate
- In office 1981–1985

Member of the Illinois House of Representatives
- In office 1973–1981

Personal details
- Born: William Francis Mahar; January 1, 1919 Belleville, Wisconsin, U.S.
- Died: October 13, 2006 (aged 87)
- Party: Republican
- Children: William F. Mahar Jr.
- Education: University of Wisconsin
- Occupation: Politician

Military service
- Allegiance: United States
- Branch/service: United States Army
- Rank: Colonel
- Battles/wars: World War II; Battle of the Bulge
- Awards: Bronze Star Medal

William Francis Mahar Sr. (January 1, 1919 – October 13, 2006) was an American politician.

Born in Belleville, Wisconsin, Mahar served in the United States Army during World War II and was a commissioned colonel. He participated in the Battle of the Bulge and was a Bronze Star recipient. He went to the University of Wisconsin, where he studied history and political science. He served on the Homewood, Illinois village board and as village president. Mahar served in the Illinois House of Representatives from 1973 to 1981 and was a Republican. Mahar then served in the Illinois Senate from 1981 to 1985. His son William F. Mahar Jr. also served in the Illinois General Assembly.
