= Lory Meagher =

Kilkenny hurler (1899–1973)

- Lory Meagher (left) prior to the start of the 1931 All-Ireland final.

Personal information
- Native name: Labhraí Ó Meachair (Irish)
- Nickname: Lory
- Born: 25 May 1899 Tullaroan, County Kilkenny, Ireland
- Died: 17 May 1973 (aged 73) Kilkenny, Ireland
- Occupation: Farmer
- Height: 5 ft 11 in (180 cm)

Sport
- Sport: Hurling
- Position: Midfield
Club
- Years: Club
- Tullaroan
Club titles
- Kilkenny titles: 5
Inter-county*
| Years | County | Apps (scores) |
| 1924–1937 | Kilkenny | 39 (8–46) |
Inter-county titles
- Leinster titles: 8
- All-Irelands: 3
- NHL: 1
- *Inter County team apps and scores correct as of 00:59, 1 July 2013.

Lorenzo Ignatius "Lory" Meagher (25 May 1899 – 17 May 1973) was an Irish hurler who played as a midfielder at senior level for the Kilkenny county team.

Born in Tullaroan, County Kilkenny, Meagher arrived on the inter-county scene at the age of twenty-four when he first linked up with the Kilkenny senior team. He made his debut in the 1924 championship. Meagher went on to play a key part for more than a decade, and won three All-Ireland medals, eight Leinster medals and one National Hurling League medal. An All-Ireland runner-up on four occasions, Meagher also captained the team to All-Ireland victory in 1935.

Meagher represented the Leinster inter-provincial team at various times throughout his career, winning two Railway Cup medals in 1927 and 1933. At club level, he won five championship medals with Tullaroan.

Throughout his career, Meagher made 39 championship appearances for Kilkenny. His retirement came following Kilkenny's defeat by Tipperary in the 1937 championship.

His brothers, Frank, Willie and Henry, all played with distinction with Kilkenny.

Meagher has been repeatedly voted onto teams made up of hurling's greatest players, including as midfield partner to Jack Lynch on the Hurling Team of the Century in 1984 and the Hurling Team of the Millennium in 2000.

== Playing career ==
=== Club ===
Meagher played his club hurling with Tullaroan and enjoyed much success during a lengthy career.

He made his club debut in 1919, in what was the delayed ending of the 1916 championship. The delay, a direct consequence of a period of political instability in Ireland, eventually led to the suspension of the championship for a number of years. Tullaroan contested that year's final, with Meagher lining out at midfield, however, a 5–2 to 2–3 score line after an earlier drawn game resulted in victory for Mooncoin.

By 1924, the championship had resumed on a regular basis and Tullaroan contested the decider once again. A comprehensive 4–4 to 2–2 defeat of Clonmanto gave Meagher his first championship medal.

Tullaroan and Meagher made it two-in-a-row in 1925, following a narrow 3–4 to 3–3 defeat of Dicksboro.

A period of decline followed, however, Tullaroan fought back to reach the championship decider once again in 1930. A 4–4 to 0–3 trouncing of senior hurling novices Urlingford gave Meagher a third championship medal.

Tullaroan surrendered their championship crown the following year but returned to the decider again in 1933. A high-scoring 6–5 to 5–4 defeat of Carrickshock gave Meagher, who by now was captain of the team, a fourth championship medal.

Carrickshock stood in the way of a second successive championship for Tullaroan in 1934, however, they proved no match. A 6–6 to 1–5 victory gave Meagher his fifth and final championship medal and his second victory as captain.

Meagher's club career ended in much the same way in which it started, as a narrow 4–2 to 4–1 defeat by Mooncoin in the 1936 decider proved to be his final big outing with Tullaroan.

=== Inter-county ===
Meagher made his senior inter-county debut for Kilkenny in a 1–3 to 3–4 Leinster semi-final defeat by Dublin in 1924.

In 1925, Meagher lined out in his first provincial decider. Reigning champions Dublin provided the opposition and secured a 6–4 to 4–7 victory. A subsequent objection forced the result to be overturned, and Meagher collected his first Leinster medal as Kilkenny were awarded the title.

Meagher won a second Leinster medal, his first on the field of play, in 1926 as Offaly were accounted for by 3–8 to 1–4. On 24 October 1926, he lined out in his first All-Ireland decider, with his two brothers, Willie and Henry, also on the Kilkenny team to face Cork. At a snow-covered Croke Park, the first half was even enough with Cork holding an interval lead of one point, however, Kilkenny slumped in the second half, going down to a 4–6 to 2–0 defeat.

After tamely surrendering their Leinster crown to Dublin the following year, both sides met again in the provincial decider in 1929. Controversy and dissent dogged the game as the players from the Dicksboro club did not play as they disagreed with the selection committee's choice. The dispute caused a delay in taking the field. Kilkenny won the game by 3–5 to 2–6; however, Dublin objected on the grounds that Kilkenny were late taking the field. The referee reported that they were seventeen minutes late, but Dublin were also late. The final was declared null and void.

After a shock defeat by Laois in 1931, both sides met in the provincial decider the following year. A 4–7 to 4–2 victory gave Meagher his third Leinster medal. 6 September 1931 saw Kilkenny face Cork in the All-Ireland final for the first time in five years. The first half was closely contested, with a goal from Mick Ahern helping Cork to a half-time lead of 1–3 to 0–2. Cork stretched the advantage to six points in the second half, but Kilkenny came storming back with a goal and then four points on the trot to take the lead by one point. In the dying moments, Eudie Coughlan got possession and made his way towards the goal. As he did so he slipped and fell but struck the sliotar while he was down on his knees, and it went over the bar for the equalising point. A 1–6 apiece draw was the result. 11 October 1931 was the date of the replay and proved to be just as exciting a contest as the first game. Meagher was playing the best hurling of his career at this time and scored a magnificent point from 90 yards out the field. In spite of this great effort, a winner couldn't be found and both sides finished level again at 2–5 apiece. After this game, officials pressed for extra time; however, Cork captain Eudie Coughlan rejected this. It was also suggested at a meeting of Council that both teams be declared joint champions and that half an All-Ireland medal by given to each player. This motion was later defeated. As the All-Ireland saga went to a third meeting on 1 November 1931, Meagher was ruled out of the game because of broken ribs sustained in the first replay. Such was the esteem in which he was held, that the game was virtually conceded to Cork since the star captain couldn't play. In spite of fielding a younger team, Kilkenny were defeated by Cork on a score line of 5–8 to 3–4.

Kilkenny retained their provincial crown in 1932, with Meagher adding a fourth Leinster medal to his collection following a 4–6 to 3–5 defeat of Dublin. The All-Ireland final on 4 September 1932 saw Clare provide the opposition for the first time in almost twenty years. In a low-scoring game, Clare's Tull Considine scored two goals and was foiled for what would almost certainly have been a third. These goals were negated by Kilkenny's three goal-scoring heroes Matty Power, Martin White and Meagher, who scored a remarkable goal from a line ball. The final score of 3–3 to 2–3 gave victory to Kilkenny and gave Meagher an All-Ireland medal.

1933 saw Meagher add a National Hurling League medal to his collection following a 3–8 to 1–3 defeat of Limerick. He later won a fifth Leinster medal following a stunning comeback against Dublin in which he scored a decisive goal in a 7–5 to 2–5 victory. The All-Ireland final on 3 September 1933 saw a record crowd of 45,176 travel to Croke Park to see Kilkenny face and up-and-coming Limerick. After being level at the interval, the game remained close in the second half until a solo-run goal by Johnny Dunne sealed a 1–7 to 0–6 victory. It was Meagher's second consecutive All-Ireland medal.

After surrendering their provincial crown to Dublin in 1934, Kilkenny faced Laois in the decider again the following year. A 3–8 to 0–6 victory gave Meagher, who was now captain of the team, a sixth Leinster medal. Another record crowd gathered at Croke Park for the All-Ireland final between Kilkenny and Limerick on 1 September 1935. In spite of rain falling throughout the entire game, both sides served up a classic. At the beginning of the second half, Meagher sent over a huge point from midfield giving Kilkenny a lead which they wouldn't surrender. A narrow 2–5 to 2–4 victory gave Meagher a third All-Ireland medal, while he also had the honour of collecting the Liam MacCarthy Cup.

Kilkenny dominated the provincial series again in 1936 and Meagher won his seventh Leinster medal following a 4–6 to 2–5 defeat of Laois. The lure of a Kilkenny-Limerick clash brought a record crowd of over 50,000 to Croke Park for the All-Ireland decider on 6 September 1936. The first half produced a game that lived up to the previous clashes, and Limerick had a two-point advantage at half-time. In the second half, Limerick took over and Meagher's side were completely outclassed on a 5–6 to 1–5 score line.

Meagher's influence on the Kilkenny team had been in decline for a number of seasons, however, he was still chosen for the opening provincial games in 1937. A 5–3 to 2–4 defeat of the provincial final debutantes game gave him his eighth Leinster medal. For the first time in his career, Meagher was dropped from the starting fifteen for the subsequent All-Ireland semi-final defeat of Galway. The All-Ireland final against Tipperary took place at Fitzgerald Stadium, Killarney on 5 September 1937, however, Meagher was among the substitutes. He was introduced in the second half, however. Tipp gave a tour de force performance and recorded a 3–11 to 0–3 victory in one of the most one-sided championship deciders ever. This was Meagher's last game in the black and amber jersey of Kilkenny.

=== Inter-provincial ===
Meagher also had the honour of lining out with Leinster in the inter-provincial series of games.

His inter-provincial hurling career had something of an unorthodox beginning. While attending the inaugural Railway Cup semi-final between Connacht and Leinster at O'Moore Park as a spectator, one of the players on the team cried off to make way for Meagher. His performance was so good that he was retained for the decider against Munster. A 1–11 to 2–6 victory gave Meagher his first Railway Cup medal.

After a period of Munster dominance, Leinster reclaimed the title in 1933. The 4–6 to 3–6 victory gave Meagher a second Railway Cup medal.

== Recognition ==
In time, Meagher came to be regarded as one of the greatest players of all time.

Moondharrig, a contemporary hurling commentator, said of him: "Meagher was the stylist of the hurling fields, not alone in the hey-day of his career, the late '20s and early '30s, but possibly in our life-times. Certainly no sweeter striker of the ball has graced the senior championship for Meagher was equally effective off the ground or in the air, from play or from the side-placed ball.".

In his book, A Lifetime in Hurling, contemporary Tipperary hurler Tommy Doyle, wrote: "Lory Meagher was one of the greatest hurlers Kilkenny ever produced. When the occasion demanded few hurlers could rise to the same brilliancy as the Tullaroan captain, and for a period of ten years or so he inspired his county to many notable triumphs."

Following his death in 1973, prominent Gaelic games sportswriter, Pádraig Puirséil, wrote: "I have not seen the equal of his artistry, or watched a more supreme stylist. When the mood was on him Meagher was a veritable magician, with a camán for a wand; he was a wizard with the sliotar at his command."

At his funeral, his coffin was carried from the altar to the waiting hearse by former Cork legends Jack Barrett, Eudie Coughlan, Paddy "Fox" Collins and Jim O'Regan. These men had played against Meagher in the epic three-game All-Ireland saga in 1931.

A decade after his death, Meagher received the ultimate honour during the GAA's centenary year in 1984 when he was chosen at midfield on the Hurling Team of the Century. In 1988, he was chosen on a special Tullaroan team to celebrate the centenary of the club's foundation. Meagher later retained his position at midfield on the Hurling Team of the Millennium in 2000, while he was also named in the same position on a special Kilkenny Team of the Century.

In 2008, Meagher's name was further honoured when the Lory Meagher Cup was introduced for "fourth tier" teams.

== Personal life ==
Christened Lorenzo Ignatius Meagher, Lory, as he was known, was born in Tullaroan. The name Lorenzo had been in the family for generations and one of his grand uncles, named Lorenzo, had been a naval doctor. Meagher was born into a family that was heavily involved in nationalist politics and in Gaelic games. His father, Henry Joseph Meagher (born 1865), is believed to have attended the very first meeting of the Gaelic Athletic Association in Thurles in 1884. His mother, Elizabeth Keoghan (born 1866), from Threecastles, was an aunt of the famous Grace family, Dick Grace, Pierce and Jack who went on to garner fifteen All-Ireland medals in all for both Kilkenny and Dublin, A cousin was Jack Keoghan, who won five All-Ireland medals. Jer Doheny, who captained Kilkenny's first All-Ireland winning team, was also a cousin. The Meaghers were substantial farmers, farming about 130 acres of good land.

Meagher was the third child in the family. His siblings included Willie (1895–1957), Kathleen (born 1896), Frank (1897–1971), Elizabeth (1898–1987), Mary Agnes (1901–1978), Henry (1902–1982) and Rose Angela (1906–1984).

After his education at the local national school, Meagher spent the rest of his life working as a farmer and never married.

== Honours ==
=== Team ===
Tullaroan

- Kilkenny Senior Hurling Championship (5): 1924, 1925, 1930, 1933 (c), 1934 (c)

Kilkenny

- All-Ireland Senior Hurling Championship (3): 1932, 1933, 1935 (c)
- Leinster Senior Hurling Championship (8): 1925, 1926, 1931, 1932, 1933, 1935 (c), 1936, 1937
- National Hurling League (1): 1932–33

Leinster

- Railway Cup (2): 1927, 1933

=== Individual ===
Honours

- Hurling Team of the Millennium: Midfield
- Hurling Team of the Century: Midfield
- Kilkenny Team of the Century: Midfield
- Tullaroan Team of the Century: Midfield
- GAA Hall of Fame Inductee: 2013

Sporting positions
| Preceded by | Kilkenny Senior Hurling Captain; 1931 | Succeeded by Jim Dermody |
| Preceded by Eddie Doyle | Kilkenny Senior Hurling Captain; 1934–1935 | Succeeded by Paddy Larkin |
Achievements
| Preceded by Timmy Ryan (Limerick) | All-Ireland SHC winning captain 1935 | Succeeded by Mick Mackey (Limerick) |
