= List of Cork inter-county hurlers =

This is an incomplete list of hurlers who have played at senior grade for the Cork county team.

== A ==
Name	Born	Died	Club	All-Ireland SHC titles	Munster SHC titles
Liam Abernethy	1929		Castlemartyr	1952	
Mick 'Gah' Ahern	1905	1946	Blackrock	1926, 1928, 1929, 1931	1926, 1928, 1929, 1931
Paddy 'Balty' Ahern	1900	1971	Blackrock	1919, 1926, 1928, 1929, 1931	1919, 1920, 1926, 1927, 1928, 1929, 1931
Dinny Allen	1952		Nemo Rangers		1975
John Allen	1956		St Finbarr's	1978	1976
John Anderson	1978		Glen Rovers		

== B ==
Name	Born	Died	Club	All-Ireland SHC titles	Munster SHC titles
Jack Barrett	1910	1979	Kinsale	1941	1939
Shane Barrett	2001		Blarney		2025
Paddy Barry	1941		St Vincent's	1966, 1970	1966, 1969, 1970, 1972
Paddy Barry	1928	2000	Sarsfield's	1952, 1953, 1954	1952, 1953, 1954, 1956
Pat Barry			Glen Rovers	1976	1976
Seánie Barry	1945		Bride Rovers	1966	1966, 1970
Tom Barry			Carrigtwohill	1928, 1929, 1931	1928, 1929, 1931
Dinny Barry-Murphy	1904	1973	Éire Óg	1926, 1928, 1929, 1931	1926, 1927, 1928, 1929, 1931
Jimmy Barry-Murphy	1954		St Finbarr's	1976, 1977, 1978, 1984, 1986	1975, 1976, 1977, 1978, 1979, 1982, 1983, 1984, 1985, 1986
Derry Beckett	1954			1942	1942
John Bennett	1933		Blackrock	1966	1966
Micka Brennan	1933		Sarsfield's	1941, 1943	1939, 1943
John Blake			St Finbarr's		1982, 1984, 1985
Jimmy Brohan	1935		Blackrock		1956
Dean Brosnan	1991		Glen Rovers		
Alan Browne	1973		Blackrock	1999	1999, 2000, 2003
John Browne	1976		Blackrock	1999, 2004	1999, 2000
Richard Browne			Blackrock	1986	
Connie Buckley	1916		Glen Rovers	1941	1939
Din Joe Buckley			Glen Rovers	1941, 1942, 1943, 1944, 1946	1942, 1944, 1946, 1947
John Buckley			Aghabullogue	1890	
John Buckley (hurler)	1953		Glen Rovers	1892	1982, 1983
Pat Buckley			Aghabullogue	1890	
Killian Burke	1993		Midleton		2014
Denis Burns	1952		St Finbarr's		1976, 1978
Jim Buttimer				1941, 1942	1939

== C ==
Name	Born	Died	Club	All-Ireland SHC titles	Munster SHC titles
Alan Cadogan	1993		Douglas		2014, 2017
Eoin Cadogan	1986		Douglas		
Damien Cahalane	1992		St Finbarr's		2014, 2017, 2018, 2025
Michael Cahalane	1995		Bandon		
Graham Callinan	1982		Glen Rovers		
Willie Campbell	1918			1941	1939
Paddy Cantillon			Redmond's	1902	1901, 1902
Kevin Canty	1986		Valley Rovers		
Cathal Casey	1967		St Catherine's	1990	1990, 1992
Jim Cashman	1966		Blackrock	1986, 1990	1986, 1990, 1992
Mick Cashman	1931	1990	Blackrock		1954, 1956
Niall Cashman	1995		Blackrock		
Tom Cashman	1957		Blackrock	1977, 1978, 1984, 1986	1977, 1978, 1979, 1982, 1983, 1984, 1985, 1986
Willie Clancy	1907		Mallow	1931	1931
Dónal Clifford	1948		Glen Rovers	1970	1969, 1970
Johnny Clifford	1934	2007	Glen Rovers	1954	1954
Mark Coleman	1997		Blarney		2017, 2018, 2025
Martin Coleman	1950		Ballinhassig	1976, 1977, 1978	1975, 1976, 1977, 1978, 1979
Martin Coleman, Jnr	1983		Ballinhassig		
Donie Collins	1950		Blackrock		
Ger Collins	1999		Ballinhassig		
Paddy 'Fox' Collins	1903	1995	Glen Rovers	1929, 1931	1929, 1931
Patrick Collins	1996		Ballinhassig		2025
Seán Condon	1923	2001	St Finbarr's	1941, 1942, 1944	1942, 1944, 1947
Christy Connery	1967		Na Piarsaigh		
Alan Connolly	2001		Blackrock		2025
Tony Connolly	1941		St Finbarr's	1966	1966
John Considine	1964		Sarsfield's	1990	1990
Daithí Cooney	1954		Youghal		1982, 1983
Bill Cooper	1987		Youghal		2014
Brian Corcoran	1973		Erin's Own	1999, 2004, 2005	1992, 1999, 2000, 2005, 2006
Brian Corry	1988		Ballymartle		
Con Cottrell	1917	1982	Ballinhassig	1941, 1943, 1944, 1946	1942, 1953, 1944, 1946, 1947
Denis Coughlan	1945		Glen Rovers	1976, 1977, 1978	1969, 1972, 1976, 1977, 1978, 1979
Eudie Coughlan	1900	1987	Blackrock	1926, 1928, 1929, 1931	1926, 1927, 1928, 1929, 1931
Jamie Coughlan	1992		Newtownshandrum		
John Coughlan	1898	1965	Blackrock	1929, 1931	1926, 1931
Pat Coughlan			Blackrock	1893, 1894	1893, 1894
Tom Coughlan	1898	1965	Blackrock	1902, 1903	1902, 1904
Dave Creedon	1919	2007	Glen Rovers	1952, 1953, 1954	1952, 1953, 1954
Jerry Cronin	1957		Newmarket	1977, 1978	1977, 1978, 1979
Killian Cronin	1978		Cloyne		
Pa Cronin	1987		Bishopstown		2014
Johnny Crowley	1956		Bishopstown	1976, 1977, 1978, 1984, 1986	197, 1977, 1978, 1979, 1982, 1983, 1984, 1985, 1986
Tim Crowley	1952		Newcestown	1977, 1978, 1984	1977, 1978, 1979, 1982, 1983, 1984, 1985
Charlie Cullinane	1943	2015	St Finbarr's	1970	1969, 1970
Brenadan Cummins	1950		Blackrock	1976	1976
Kevin Cummins	1946		Blackrock		
Ray Cummins	1948		Blackrock	1970, 1976, 1977, 1978	1969, 1970, 1972, 1975, 1976, 1977, 1978, 1979, 1982
Ger Cunningham	1961		St Finbarr's	1984, 1986, 1990	1982, 1983, 1984, 1985, 1986, 1990, 1992
Ronan Curran	1981		St Finbarr's	2004, 2005	2003, 2005, 2006
Conor Cusack	1979		Cloyne		
Donal Óg Cusack	1977		Cloyne	1999, 2004, 2005	1999, 2000, 2003, 2005, 2006
Michael Cussen	1984		Sarsfield's		

== D ==
Name	Born	Died	Club	All-Ireland SHC titles	Munster SHC titles
Declan Dalton	1997		Fr. O'Neill's		
Willie John Daly	1925	2017	Carrigtwohill	1952, 1953, 1954	1952, 1953, 1954, 1956
Joe Deane	1977		Killeagh	1999, 2004, 2005	1999, 2000, 2003, 2005, 2006
Paddy Delea	1901		Blackrock	1926, 1928, 1929, 1931	1926, 1927, 1928, 1929, 1931
Peter Doolan	1940		St Finbarr's	1966	1966
Liam Dowling	1931		Castlemartyr/Sarsfields	1952, 1953	1952, 1953
Dan Drew	1878	1923	Aghabullogue		

== E ==
Name	Born	Died	Club	All-Ireland SHC titles	Munster SHC titles
Barry Egan	1972		Delaney Rovers		1992
Jack Egan	1904	1984	Glen Rovers & Blackrock		
William Egan	1990		Kilbrin		2014
Mark Ellis	1990		Millstreet		2014

== F ==
Name	Born	Died	Club	All-Ireland SHC titles	Munster SHC titles
John Fenton	1954		Midleton	1984, 1986	1975, 1979, 1982, 1983, 1984, 1985, 1986
Ger FitzGerald	1964		Midleton	1986, 1990	1990, 1992
Paddy FitzGerald	1939		Midleton	1966	1966
Darragh Fitzgibbon	1997		Charleville		2017, 2025
John Fitzgibbon	1967		Glen Rovers	1990	1986, 1990, 1992
Mark Foley	1967		Arigdeen Rangers	1990	1990
Matty Fuohy			Carrigtwohill	1952, 1953, 1954	1952, 1953, 1954

== G ==
Name	Born	Died	Club	All-Ireland SHC titles	Munster SHC titles
John Gardiner	1983		Na Piarsaigh	2004, 2005	2003, 2005, 2006
William Gleeson			Tower St.		
Éamonn Goulding	1933		Glen Rovers	1954	
Ned Grey	1895	1974	Carrigtwohill		

== H ==
Name	Born	Died	Club	All-Ireland SHC titles	Munster SHC titles
Séamus Harnedy	1990		St Ita's		2014, 2017, 2018, 2025
Josie Hartnett	1927	2005	Glen Rovers	1953, 1954	1952, 1953, 1954, 1956
John Hartnett	1960		Midleton		
Kevin Hartnett	1984		Russell Rovers		
Pat Hartnett	1960		Midleton		
Brian Hayes	2001		St Finbarr's		2025
Derry Hayes	1928	2005	Blackrock	1953, 1954	1953, 1954
Stephen Hayes			Blackrock	1894	1894
Diarmuid Healy	2004		Lisgoold		2025
Pat Hegarty	1947		Youghal	1970	1969, 1970, 1972, 1975
Jer Henchion			Aghabullogue	1890	
Kevin Hennessy	1961		Midleton	1984, 1986, 1990	1982, 1983, 1984, 1985, 1986, 1990, 1992
John Hodgins	1961		St Finbarr's	1984	1984, 1985, 1986
John Horgan	1952		Blackrock	1970, 1976, 1977, 1978	1970, 1975, 1976, 1977, 1978, 1979
Pat Horgan	1957		Glen Rovers		
Patrick Horgan	1988		Glen Rovers		2014, 2017, 2018, 2025
Jim Hurley	1902	1965	Blackrock	1926, 1928, 1929, 1931	1926, 1927, 1928, 1929, 1931

== I ==
Name	Born	Died	Club	All-Ireland SHC titles	Munster SHC titles
Tom Irwin	1873	1956	Redmonds		

== J ==
Name	Born	Died	Club	All-Ireland SHC titles	Munster SHC titles
Barry Johnson	1984		Bride Rovers		
Christopher Joyce	1992		Na Piasaigh		2014
Ciarán Joyce	2001		Castlemartyr		2025

== K ==
Name	Born	Died	Club	All-Ireland SHC titles	Munster SHC titles
Daniel Kearney			Sarsfields		
William Kearney			Sarsfields		
Jamesy Kelleher	1878	1943	Dungourney	1894, 1902, 1903	1894, 1901, 1902, 1903, 1904, 1905, 1907, 1912
Pat Kenneally	1968		Newcestown		
Jimmy 'Major' Kennedy			Carrigtwohill	1919	1912, 1915, 1919, 1920
Mick Kennefick	1924	1982	St Finbarr's	1942, 1943	1942, 1943
Tom Kenny	1981		Grenagh	2004, 2005	2003, 2005, 2006
John Kidney	1872		Blackrock		
Kieran Kingston	1963		Tracton	1986	
Tom Kingston	1967		Tracton		
Shane Kingston	1997		Douglas		2025

== L ==
Name	Born	Died	Club	All-Ireland SHC titles	Munster SHC titles
Dan Lane	1861	1940	Aghabullogue	1890	1890
Mark Landers	1972		Killeagh	1999	1999
Brian Lawton	1988		Castlemartyr		2014
Conor Lehane	1992		Midleton		2014, 2017, 2018, 2025
Brendan Lombard	1980		Ballinhassig		
Séamus Looney	1950		St Finbarr's	1970	1970, 1972
Alan Lotty	1920	1973	Sarsfields	1941, 1942, 1943, 1944, 1946	1939, 1943, 1944, 1946, 1947
Jimmy Lynam	1925		Glen Rovers	1953	1953
Jack Lynch	1917	1999	Glen Rovers	1941, 1942, 1943, 1944, 1946	1939, 1942, 1943, 1944, 1946, 1947
John Lyons	1924		Glen Rovers	1952, 1953, 1954	1952, 1953, 1954, 1956

== M ==
Name	Born	Died	Club	All-Ireland SHC titles	Munster SHC titles
Dermot Mac Curtain	1957		Blackrock	1977, 1978, 1984	1977, 1978, 1979, 1982, 1983, 1984, 1985, 1986
Tony Maher	1945		St Finbarr's	1970	1969, 1970, 1972, 1975
Charlie McCarthy	1946		St Finbarr's	1966, 1970, 1976, 1977, 1978	1966, 1969, 1970, 1972, 1975, 1976, 1977, 1978, 1979
Cian McCarthy	1989		Sarsfields		2014
Darren McCarthy	1990		Ballymartle		2014
Garvan McCarthy	1980		Sarsfields		
Gerald McCarthy	1945		St Finbarr's	1966, 1970, 1976, 1977, 1978	1966, 1969, 1970, 1972, 1975, 1976, 1977, 1978, 1979
Justin McCarthy	1945		Passage	1966	1966, 1969, 1972
Niall McCarthy	1982		Carrigtwohill	2004, 2005	2003, 2005, 2006
Seánie McCarthy	1966		Ballinhassig	1990	1990, 1992
Teddy McCarthy	1964		Sarsfields	1986, 1990	1992
Timmy McCarthy	1977		Castlelyons	1999, 2004, 2005	1999, 2000, 2003, 2005, 2006
Fergal McCormack	1974		Mallow	1999	1999, 2000
Pat McDonnell	1950		Inniscarra	1970, 1976	1970, 1972, 1975, 1976, 1977
Stephen McDonnell	1989		Glen Rovers		2014
Seánie McGrath	1975		Glen Rovers	1999	1999, 2000
Kieran McGuckin	1968		Glen Rovers	1990	1990
Lorcán McLoughlin	1989		Kanturk		2014
Billy Mackessy			Blackrock	1903	1903, 1905, 1912
Morgan Madden			Redmond's	1928, 1929, 1931	1928, 1929, 1931
Mick Malone	1950		Midleton	1976, 1977	1972, 1976, 1977, 1978
Luke Meade	1996		Newcestown		2025
John Meyler	1956		St Finbarr's	1986	
Ger Millerick	1999		Fr. O'Neill's		
John Mitchell	1946		Blarney		
Willie Moore	1931	2003		1954	1954
Pat Moylan	1949		Blackrock	1976, 1977, 1978	1976, 1977, 1978
Stephen Moylan	1987		Douglas		
Denis Mulcahy	1956		Midleton	1984, 1986	1984, 1985, 1986, 1992
Pat Mulcahy	1975		Newtownshandrum	2005	2003, 2005, 2006
Tom Mulcahy	1923		Glen Rovers	1943, 1944, 1946	1943, 1944, 1946, 1947
Tomás Mulcahy	1963		Glen Rovers	1984, 1986, 1990	1983, 1984, 1985, 1986, 1992
Mark Mullins			Na Piarsaigh		
Bertie Óg Murphy	1954		Sarsfields		1983
Brian Murphy	1982		Bride Rovers	2004, 2005	2005, 2006
Brian Murphy	1952		Nemo Rangers	1976, 1977, 1978	1972, 1975, 1976, 1977, 1979, 1982, 1983
Con Murphy	1922	2007	Valley Rovers	1942, 1943, 1944, 1946	1942, 1943, 1944, 1946, 1947
Cormac Murphy	1993		Mallow		
Denis Murphy	1939		Grenagh, St Finbarr's	1966	1966, 1969
Gerald Murphy	1928	1978	Midleton	1952, 1953, 1954	1952, 1953, 1954, 1956
John 'Curtis' Murphy			Blackrock	1893	1893
Kieran Murphy	1983		Erin's Own	2005	2005
Kieran Murphy	1983		Sarsfields	2004, 2005	2005, 2006
Kilian Murphy	1989		Erin's Own		
Seán Óg Murphy	1897	1956	Blackrock	1919, 1926, 1928, 1929	1915, 1919, 1920, 1926, 1927, 1928
Shane Murphy	1983		Erin's Own		
Willie 'Long Puck' Murphy	1915	1977	Ballincollig	1941, 1942, 1943, 1944, 1946	1939, 1942, 1943, 1944, 1946, 1947
Tadhg Murphy	1956		Sarsfields	1977	
Kevin Murray	1972		St Finbarr's	1999	1999, 2000

== N ==
Name	Born	Died	Club	All-Ireland SHC titles	Munster SHC titles
Anthony Nash	1985		Kanturk		2014
Cathal Naughton	1987		Newtownshandrum		
Frank Norberg	1948		Blackrock	1972	1972
Jer Norberg			Blackrock	1893, 1894	1893, 1894

== O ==
Name	Born	Died	Club	All-Ireland SHC titles	Munster SHC titles
Aisake Ó hAilpín	1985		Na Piarsaigh		
Seán Óg Ó hAilpín	1977		Na Piarsaigh	1999, 2004, 2005	1999, 2000, 2003, 2005, 2006
Setanta Ó hAilpín	1983		Na Piarsaigh		2003
Eddie O'Brien	1945		Passage	1970	1969, 1970
Teddy O'Brien	1949	2000	Glen Rovers		1975
Bill O'Callaghan	1868	1946	Redmond's	1892	1892
Johnny O'Callaghan	1964		Ballyhea		
Edward 'Marie' O'Connell	c.1900	1971	Blackrock	1926, 1928, 1929, 1931	1926, 1927, 1928, 1929, 1931
Mick O'Connell			St Finbarr's	1928, 1929, 1931	1926, 1927, 1928, 1929, 1931
Mickey O'Connell	1979		Midleton	1999	2003
Tommy O'Connell	2000		Midleton		2025
Ben O'Connor	1979		Newtownshandrum	1999, 2004, 2005	1999, 2000, 2003, 2005, 2006
Bernie O'Connor	1950		Meelin		
Cian O'Connor	1984		Erin's Own	2006	
Jack O'Connor	1998		Sarsfields		
Jerry O'Connor	1979		Newtownshandrum	2004, 2005	2003, 2005, 2006
Martin O'Doherty	1952		Glen Rovers	1976, 1977, 1978	1975, 1976, 1977, 1978, 1979, 1982
Éamonn O'Donoghue	1951		Blackrock	1976, 1978	1978, 1982, 1983
Seán O'Donoghue	1996		Inniscarra		
Tom O'Donoghue	1940		Sarsfields	1966	1966, 1969
Paddy O'Donovan	1916	1990	Glen Rovers	1941, 1942, 1943, 1944, 1946	1939, 1942, 1943, 1944, 1946, 1947
Luke O'Farrell	1990		Midleton		2017
Robbie O'Flynn	1997		Erin's Own		2025
Seán O'Gorman	1960		Milford	1990	1990, 1992
Dónal O'Grady	1953		St Finbarr's	1984	1982, 1983, 1984
Peter 'Hawker' O'Grady			Blackrock	1928, 1929, 1931	1928, 1929, 1931
John O'Halloran	1943		Blackrock	1966	1966
Chris O'Leary	1997		Valley Rovers		
Seánie O'Leary	1952		Youghal	1976, 1977, 1978, 1984	1972, 1975, 1976, 1977, 1982, 1984
Tim O'Mahony	1997		Newtownshandrum		2025
Shane O'Neill	1986		Bishopstown		2014
Jim O'Regan			Kinsale	1926, 1928, 1929, 1931	1926, 1928, 1929, 1931
Gerry O'Riordan			Blackrock	1946, 1952, 1953, 1954	1946, 1947, 1952, 1953, 1954
Mossy O'Riordan	1927	2008	Blackrock	1946, 1952	1946, 1947, 1952
Tony O'Shaughnessy	1930	2006	St Finbarr's	1952, 1953, 1954	1952, 1953, 1954
Rob O'Shea	1993		Carrigaline		2014
Brendan O'Sullivan	1965		Valley Rovers	1990	1990
Conor O'Sullivan	1989		Sarsfields		
Diarmuid O'Sullivan	1978		Cloyne	1999, 2004, 2005	1999, 2000, 2003, 2005, 2006
Jerry O'Sullivan	1940	1985	Glen Rovers	1966	1970
Michael O'Sullivan	1990		Tracton		
Paudie O'Sullivan	1988		Cloyne		2014
Tom O'Sullivan				1953	1954
Tony O'Sullivan	1963		Na Piarsaigh	1984, 1986, 1990	1982, 1983, 1984, 1985, 1986, 1990, 1992

== P ==
Name	Born	Died	Club	All-Ireland SHC titles	Munster SHC titles
Ned Porter			Brian Dillons & Glen Rovers	1942	1942
Ger Power	1960		Midleton		
Mark Prendergast	1978		Na Piarsaigh		

== Q ==
Name	Born	Died	Club	All-Ireland SHC titles	Munster SHC titles
David Quirke	1970		Midleton	1990	1990
Johnny Quirke	1911	1983	Blackrock	1941, 1942, 1943, 1944	1939, 1942, 1943, 1944

== R ==
Name	Born	Died	Club	All-Ireland SHC titles	Munster SHC titles
Christy Ring	1920	1979	Glen Rovers	1941, 1942, 1943, 1944, 1946, 1952, 1953, 1954	1942, 1943, 1944, 1946, 1947, 1952, 1953, 1954, 1956
Steva Riordan			Blackrock	1903	1903, 1904, 1907
Con Roche	1946		St Finbarr's	1970	1970, 1972, 1975
Bernard Rochford	1979		Killeagh	1999	1999, 2000
Darren Ronan	1976		Ballyhea		
Neil Ronan	1979		Ballyhea	1999, 2005	1999, 2005, 2006
Fergal Ryan	1972		Blackrock	1999	1999, 2000
Pat Ryan	1976		Sarsfields		1999, 2000
Tomás Ryan	1943		Inniscarra	1970	1969, 1970
James 'Bobby' Ring	1913		Carrigtwohill	1941	1939

== S ==
Name	Born	Died	Club	All-Ireland SHC titles	Munster SHC titles
Brian Sheehan	1972		Blarney		1992
Colm Sheehan	c.1940		Éire Óg	1966	1966
Wayne Sherlock	1978		Blackrock	1999, 2004	1999, 2000, 2003, 2005
Colm Spillane	1993		Castlelyons		2017
Darren Sweetnam	1993		Dohenys		

== T ==
Name	Born	Died	Club	All-Ireland SHC titles	Munster SHC titles
Batt Thornhill			Buttevant	1941, 1942, 1943, 1944	1939, 1942, 1943, 1944
Paul Tierney	1982		Blackrock		
Charlie Tobin			Glen Rovers	1942	1942
Tom Toomey			Aghabullogue	1890	
Roger Tuohy	1945		Na Piarsaigh		1969
Joe Twomey			Glen Rovers	1952, 1953	1952, 1953

== W ==
Name	Born	Died	Club	All-Ireland SHC titles	Munster SHC titles
Aidan Walsh	1990		Kanturk		2014
Austin Walsh	1977		Kildorrery		
Denis Walsh	1965		St Catherine's	1986, 1990	1984, 1986, 1990, 1992
Denis Walsh	1961		Cloughduv & St Finbarr's		
Willie Walsh	1948		Youghal	1970	1969, 1970, 1975
Mick Waters	1941		Blackrock	1966	1966
Stephen White	1988		Ballygarvan		

== Y ==
Name	Born	Died	Club	All-Ireland SHC titles	Munster SHC titles
Jim Young	1915	1992	Glen Rovers	1941, 1942, 1943, 1944, 1946	1939, 1942, 1943, 1944, 1946, 1947

== Top scorers ==
As of 28 May 2018

Name	Club	Career	All-Ireland titles	Munster titles	Apps	Goals	Points	Total
Christy Ring	Glen Rovers	1940-1962	8	9	64	33	208	307
Joe Deane	Killeagh	1996-2008	3	5	50	10	239	269
Ben O'Connor	Newtownshandrum	1999-	3	5	51	8	224	248
Charlie McCarthy	St Finbarr's	1965-1980	5	9	45	24	149	221
John Fenton	Midleton	1975-1987	2	7	31	8	132	156
Tony O'Sullivan	Na Piarsaigh	1982-1995	3	7	39	1	140	143
Mick Ahern	Blackrock	1925-1932	4	5	30	35	27	132
Jimmy Kennedy	Carrigtwohill	1912-1927	1	4	26	42	5	131
Seánie O'Leary	Youghal	1971-1984	4	9	36	30	33	123
Jimmy Barry-Murphy	St Finbarr's	1975-1986	5	10	40	23	52	121
Kevin Hennessy	Midleton	1982-1993	3	7	22	23	49	118
Jack Lynch	Glen Rovers	1936-1950	5	6	42	13	66	105
Ray Cummins	Blackrock	1969-1982	4	9	35	18	46	100
Paddy Ahern	Blackrock	1919-1931	5	7	37	23	11	80
Johnny Quirke	Blackrock	1932-1946	4	4	33	19	20	77

== See also ==
- List of Cork inter-county footballers
