= Edward O'Connell =

Irish hurler

Edward "Marie" O'Connell
Personal information
- Native name: Éamonn Ó Conaill (Irish)
- Nickname: Marie
- Born: 25 April 1897 Ballintemple, Cork, Ireland
- Died: 27 January 1971 (aged 73) Cork, Ireland
- Occupation: Cork Gas Co. employee

Sport
- Sport: Hurling
- Position: Full-back
Club
- Years: Club
- Blackrock
Club titles
- Cork titles: 7
Inter-county
Years	County	Apps (scores)
1920–1932	Cork	32 (0-00)
Inter-county titles
- Munster titles: 5
- All-Irelands: 4
- NHL: 2

Edward "O'Connell (25 April 1897 – 27 January 1971) was an Irish hurler who played as a full-back for the Cork senior team.

Born in Blackrock, Cork, O'Connell first arrived on the inter-county scene at the age of twenty-two when he first linked up with the Cork senior team. He made his senior debut during the 1920 championship. O'Connell later became a regular member of the starting fifteen, and won four All-Ireland medals, five Munster medals and two National Hurling League medals.

As a member of the Munster inter-provincial team on a number of occasions, O'Connell won two Railway Cup medals. At club level he was a seven-time championship medallist with Blackrock.

Throughout his career O'Connell made 32 championship appearances. He retired from inter-county hurling following the conclusion of the 1932 championship.

== Playing career ==
=== Club ===
In 1920 O'Connell was a key member of the Blackrock senior hurling team. He won his first championship medal that year following a huge 14–4 to 2–0 trouncing of Fairhill.

Four years later "the Rockies" were back in the senior decider. O'Connell won his second championship medal that year following a 3–5 to 1–2 defeat of Redmonds.

Blackrock retained the title in 1925, with O'Connell collecting a third championship medal following a 6–4 to 2–3 defeat of St. Finbarr's.

Three-in-a-row proved beyond Blackrock, however, in 1927 they were back in a fourth successive decider. A 5–5 to 2–1 defeat of Redmonds gave Ahern a fourth championship medal.

After a one-year hiatus "the Rockies" were back in the county decider once again in 1929. A 5–6 to 2–2 defeat of St. Finbarr's gave O'Connell a fifth championship medal. It was the beginning of a great era of success for the club as further final victories over Glen Rovers in 1930 and Éire Óg in 1931 brought O'Connell's championship medal tally to seven.

=== Inter-county ===
==== Early successes ====
O'Connell made his senior championship debut for Cork on 13 June 1920 when he was introduced as a substitute in a 2–5 to 2–3 Munster semi-final defeat of Kerry. He remained on and off the team over the next few years, as he found it difficult to nail down a place on the team.

Cork remained in the doldrums for much of this time, however, the team bounced back during the 1925–26 league, the inaugural running of the competition. O'Connell later collected a first National Hurling League medal following a 3–7 to 1–5 defeat of Dublin in the decider. He later won his first Munster medal following a three-game saga with Tipperary, culminating in a 3–6 to 2–4 victory for Cork. On 24 October 1926 O'Connell lined out in his first All-Ireland decider, as Cork faced Kilkenny for the first time since 1912. At a snow-covered Croke Park, the first half was even enough with Cork holding an interval lead of one point, however, Kilkenny slumped in the second half, going down to a 4–6 to 2–0 defeat. It was O'Connell's first All-Ireland medal.

Cork retained the provincial crown in 1927, with O'Connell collecting a second Munster medal following a 5–3 to 3–4 defeat of Clare. Cork later faced Dublin in the All-Ireland decider on 4 September 1927. The Metropolitans were well on top in the opening thirty minutes and took a 2–3 to 0–1 lead at the interval. Cork fought back in the third quarter, however, an expert display of goalkeeping by Tommy Daly saved the day by keeping Mick "Gah" Ahern scoreless, as Dublin went on to win by 4–8 to 1–3.

In 1928 O'Connell won a third Munster medal following a 6–4 to 2–2 defeat of Clare in a replay. On 9 September 1928 Cork faced Galway in the All-Ireland decider. The Westerners, who got a bye into the final without lifting a hurley, were no match as a rout ensued. Ahern's brother, Mick, ran riot scoring 5–4, a record for an All-Ireland final, as Cork triumphed by 6–12 to 1–0. It was his second All-Ireland medal.

O'Connell won a fourth Munster medal in 1929 as Cork made it four-in-a-row following a 4–6 to 2–3 defeat of Waterford. On 1 September 1929 Cork faced Galway in the All-Ireland final for the second successive year. Little had changed in a year as Cork were on the top of their game again. A rout ensued as "the Rebels" and O'Connell claimed a third All-Ireland title following a 4–9 to 1–3 victory.

Cork exited the championship at the first hurdle in 1930, however, O'Connell finished the year by winning a second league medal following a 3–5 to 3–0 defeat of Dublin the decider.

==== Fourth All-Ireland medal ====
O'Connell won a seventh Munster medal in 1931 following a 5–4 to 1–2 defeat of Waterford. 6 September 1931 saw Kilkenny face Cork in the All-Ireland final for the first time in five years. The first half was closely contested, with a goal from Mick Ahern helping Cork to a half-time lead of 1–3 to 0–2. Cork stretched the advantage to six points in the second half, but Kilkenny came storming back with a goal and then four points on the trot to take the lead by one point. In the dying moments Cork captain Eudie Coughlan got possession and made his way towards the goal. As he did so he slipped and fell but struck the sliotar while he was down on his knees, and it went over the bar for the equalising point. A 1–6 apiece draw was the result. 11 October 1931 was the date of the replay and proved to be just as exciting a contest as the first game. Kilkenny's Lory Meagher was playing the best hurling of his career at this time and scored a magnificent point from 90 yards out the field. In spite of this great effort a winner couldn't be found and both sides finished level again at 2–5 apiece. After this game officials pressed for extra time, however, Eudie Coughlan rejected this. It was also suggested at a meeting of Central Council that both teams be declared joint champions and that half an All-Ireland medal by given to each player. This motion was later defeated. As the All-Ireland saga went to a third meeting on 1 November 1931, Kilkenny's captain Meagher was ruled out of the game because of broken ribs sustained in the first replay. Such was the esteem in which he was held the game was virtually conceded to Cork since the star player couldn't play. In spite of fielding a younger team, Kilkenny were defeated by Cork on a score line of 5–8 to 3–4. This victory meant that O'Connell collected a fourth All-Ireland medal.

==== Decline ====
At the beginning of 1932 O'Connell was appointed captain of the Cork team. Eudie Coughlan was in line to retain the captaincy, however, he took umbrage at the actions of the Cork County Board in taking from his club, Blackrock, the selection of the Cork senior hurling team for the upcoming year, and he retired from inter-county activity. Cork's championship campaign came to an end with a Munster final defeat by Clare. O'Connell retired from inter-county hurling following this defeat.

=== Inter-provincial ===
O'Connell was chosen on the Munster team for the inaugural inter-provincial championship in 1927. The southern province lost out to arch rivals Leinster on that occasion.

In 1928 O'Connell was picked for inter-provincial duty once again. Reigning champions Leinster were the opponents and a low-scoring game developed. A narrow 2–2 to 1–2 victory gave O'Connell his first Railway Cup medal.

O'Connell was included on the team once again in 1929. A 5–3 to 3–1 defeat of Leinster gave him a second consecutive Railway Cup medal.

== Honours ==
=== Player ===
Blackrock

- Cork Senior Hurling Championship (7): 1920, 1924, 1925, 1927, 1929, 1930, 1931

Cork

- All-Ireland Senior Hurling Championship (4): 1926, 1928, 1929 (c), 1931
- Munster Senior Hurling Championship (5): 1926, 1927, 1928, 1929 (c), 1931
- National Hurling League (2): 1925–26, 1929–30

Munster

- Railway Cup (2): 1928, 1929

Sporting positions
Preceded by Eudie Coughlan	Cork Senior Hurling Captain; 1932	Succeeded by
