= Paddy Ahern =

Irish hurler

Paddy "Balty" Ahern
Personal information
- Native name: Páidí Ó hEachtairn (Irish)
- Nickname: Balty
- Born: 23 October 1900 Douglas, Cork, Ireland
- Died: 2 October 1971 (aged 70) Cork, Ireland

Sport
- Sport: Hurling
- Position: Centre-forward
Club
- Years: Club
- Blackrock
Club titles
- Cork titles: 7
Inter-county
Years	County	Apps (scores)
1919–1931	Cork	37 (23–11)
Inter-county titles
- Munster titles: 7
- All-Irelands: 5
- NHL: 2

Paddy "Balty" Ahern (23 October 1900 – 2 October 1971) was an Irish hurler who played as a centre-forward for the Cork senior team.

Born in Douglas, Cork, Ahern first played competitive hurling during his schooling at Crab Lane National School. He arrived on the inter-county scene at the age of eighteen when he first linked up with the Cork senior team. He made his senior debut during the 1919 championship. Ahern immediately became a regular member of the starting fifteen, and won five All-Ireland medals, seven Munster medals and two National Hurling League medals. He was an All-Ireland runner-up on two occasions.

As a member of the Munster inter-provincial team on a number of occasions, Ahern won one Railway Cup medal. At club level he was a seven-time championship medallist with Blackrock.

His brother, Mick "Gah" Ahern, was a teammate with Cork and won four All-Ireland medals.

Throughout his career Ahern made 37 championship appearances. He retired from inter-county hurling following the conclusion of the 1931 championship.

== Hurling career ==
=== Club ===
In 1920 Ahern was a key member of the Blackrock senior hurling team. He won his first championship medal that year following a huge 14–4 to 2–0 trouncing of Fairhill.

Four years later "the Rockies" were back in the senior decider. Ahern won his second championship medal that year following a 3–5 to 1–2 defeat of Redmonds.

Blackrock retained the title in 1925, with Ahern collecting a third championship medal following a 6–4 to 2–3 defeat of St. Finbarr's.

Three-in-a-row proved beyond Blackrock, however, in 1927 they were back in a fourth successive decider. A 5–5 to 2–1 defeat of Redmonds gave Ahern a fourth championship medal.

After a one-year hiatus "the Rockies" were back in the county decider once again in 1929. A 5–6 to 2–2 defeat of St. Finbarr's gave Ahern a fifth championship medal. It was the beginning of a great era of success for the club as further final victories over Glen Rovers in 1930 and Éire Óg in 1931 brought Ahern's championship medal tally to seven.

=== Inter-county ===
==== Early success ====
Ahern made his senior championship debut for Cork on 24 August 1919 as Limerick were the opponents in what was the provincial decider. A 3–5 to 1–6 victory gave Cork the title for the first time in sixteen years, while Ahern collected his first Munster medal. Cork later faced Dublin in the All-Ireland decider on 21 September 1919. Cork, who were wearing the distinctive red jersey for the very first time, proved too good for the metropolitans and had a commanding 4–2 to 1–1 lead at the interval courtesy of four goals by Jimmy "Major" Kennedy. Dublin could not stop the Cork onslaught as "the Rebels" went on to secure a 6–4 to 2–4 victory and a first All-Ireland medal for Ahern.

The War of Independence delayed the playing of the 1920 championship for over two years. In spite of this Cork retained their provincial crown. The 3–4 to 0–5 victory over Limerick gave Ahern a second Munster medal. Dublin provided the opposition in the subsequent All-Ireland decider on 14 May 1922. The metropolitans were out to avenge the defeat of the previous year and came out with all guns blazing. Joe Phelan went on the rampage and scored four goals in quick succession to give Dublin a merited 4–9 to 4–3 victory.

==== Return to winning ways ====
Cork went into a period of decline over the next few years, however, the team bounced back during the 1925–26 league, the inaugural running of the competition. Ahern later collected a first National Hurling League medal following a 3–7 to 1–5 defeat of Dublin in the decider. He later won his third Munster medal following a three-game saga with Tipperary, culminating in a 3–6 to 2–4 victory for Cork. On 24 October 1926 Ahern lined out in his third All-Ireland decider, as Cork faced Kilkenny for the first time since 1912. At a snow-covered Croke Park, the first half was even enough with Cork holding an interval lead of one point, however, Kilkenny slumped in the second half, going down to a 4–6 to 2–0 defeat. It was Ahern's second All-Ireland medal.

Cork retained the provincial crown in 1927, with Ahern collecting a fourth Munster medal following a 5–3 to 3–4 defeat of Clare. He was switched from centre-forward to right corner-forward for Cork's subsequent All-Ireland meeting with Dublin on 4 September 1927. The Metropolitans were well on top in the opening thirty minutes and took a 2–3 to 0–1 lead at the interval. Cork fought back in the third quarter, however, an expert display of goalkeeping by Tommy Daly saved the day by keeping Ahern scoreless, as Dublin went on to win by 4–8 to 1–3.

==== Continued dominance ====
In 1928 Ahern won a fifth Munster medal following a 6–4 to 2–2 defeat of Clare in a replay. On 9 September 1928 Cork faced Galway in the All-Ireland decider. The Westerners, who got a bye into the final without lifting a hurley, were no match as a rout ensued. Ahern's brother, Mick, ran riot scoring 5–4, a record for an All-Ireland final, as Cork triumphed by 6–12 to 1–0. It was his third All-Ireland medal.

Ahern won a sixth Munster medal in 1929 as Cork made it four-in-a-row following a 4–6 to 2–3 defeat of Waterford. On 1 September 1929 Cork faced Galway in the All-Ireland final for the second successive year. Little had changed in a year as Cork were on the top of their game again. A rout ensued as "the Rebels" and Ahern claimed a fourth All-Ireland title following a 4–9 to 1–3 victory.

Cork exited the championship at the first hurdle in 1930, however, Ahern finished the year by winning a second league medal following a 3–5 to 3–0 defeat of Dublin the decider.

==== Fifth All-Ireland medal ====
Ahern was at corner-forward for much of the 1931 championship campaign. He won a seventh Munster medal that year following a 5–4 to 1–2 defeat of Waterford. 6 September 1931 saw Kilkenny face Cork in the All-Ireland final for the first time in five years. The first half was closely contested, with a goal from Mick Ahern helping Cork to a half-time lead of 1–3 to 0–2. Cork stretched the advantage to six points in the second half, but Kilkenny came storming back with a goal and then four points on the trot to take the lead by one point. In the dying moments Cork captain Eudie Coughlan got possession and made his way towards the goal. As he did so he slipped and fell but struck the sliotar while he was down on his knees, and it went over the bar for the equalising point. A 1–6 apiece draw was the result. 11 October 1931 was the date of the replay and proved to be just as exciting a contest as the first game. Kilkenny's Lory Meagher was playing the best hurling of his career at this time and scored a magnificent point from 90 yards out the field. In spite of this great effort a winner couldn't be found and both sides finished level again at 2–5 apiece. After this game officials pressed for extra time, however, Eudie Coughlan rejected this. It was also suggested at a meeting of Central Council that both teams be declared joint champions and that half an All-Ireland medal by given to each player. This motion was later defeated. As the All-Ireland saga went to a third meeting on 1 November 1931, Kilkenny's captain Meagher was ruled out of the game because of broken ribs sustained in the first replay. Such was the esteem in which he was held the game was virtually conceded to Cork since the star player couldn't play. In spite of fielding a younger team, Kilkenny were defeated by Cork on a score line of 5–8 to 3–4. This victory meant that Ahern became the first Cork player to win five All-Ireland medals. He remains the only Cork player to win an All-Ireland medal on the field of play in each of three decades.

=== Inter-provincial ===
Ahern was selected for duty with Munster in the inter-provincial championship in 1928. Reigning champions Leinster were the opponents and a low-scoring game developed. A narrow 2–2 to 1–2 victory gave Ahern a Railway Cup medal.

== Personal life ==
Born in Douglas, Cork, Ahern was the sixth child and second youngest son born to Patrick and Norah Ahern. He was educated at Crab Lane National School where his hurling skills were first developed and he quickly earned a reputation for his skill in the school shield competitions.

Ahern died on 2 October 1971.

== Honours ==
=== Team ===
Blackrock

- Cork Senior Hurling Championship (7): 1920, 1924, 1925, 1927, 1929, 1930, 1931

Cork

- All-Ireland Senior Hurling Championship (5): 1919, 1926, 1928, 1929, 1931
- Munster Senior Hurling Championship (7): 1919, 1920, 1926, 1927, 1928, 1929, 1931
- National Hurling League (2): 1925–26, 1929–30

Munster

- Railway Cup (1): 1928
