= Mick O'Connell (hurler) =

Irish hurler (1900–1966)

Personal information
- Native name: Mícheál Ó Conaill (Irish)
- Born: 20 April 1900 Ballincollig, County Cork, Ireland
- Died: 27 January 1966 (aged 65) Cork, Ireland
- Occupation: Rate collector

Sport
- Sport: Hurling
- Position: Midfield
Club
- Years: Club
- 1922-1935: St Finbarr's
Club titles
- Cork titles: 5
Inter-county*
Years	County	Apps (scores)
1921–1934	Cork	27 (2–03)
Inter-county titles
- Munster titles: 4
- All-Irelands: 3
- NHL: 1
- *Inter County team apps and scores correct as of 17:40, 7 April 2015.

Michael Aloysius O'Connell (20 April 1900 – 27 January 1966) was an Irish hurler who played as a midfielder at senior level for the Cork county team.

Born in Cork, O'Connell first arrived on the inter-county scene when he first linked up with the Cork senior team before later joining the junior side. He made his senior debut during the 1921 championship. O'Connell subsequently became a regular member of the starting fifteen, and won three All-Ireland medals, four Munster medals and one National Hurling League medal.

As a member of the Munster inter-provincial team on a number of occasions, O'Connell won one Railway Cup medal. At club level he was a five-time championship medallist with St Finbarr's.

Throughout his career O'Connell made 27 championship appearances. He retired from inter-county hurling following the conclusion of the 1934 championship.

== Playing career ==
=== Club ===
O'Connell experienced his first success with St Finbarr's in 1923. After reaching the final of the club championship, "the Barr's" were granted a walkover from Blackrock as they couldn't field a team due to sustaining several injuries in the semi-final. It was O'Connell's first championship medal.

St Finbarr's and Blackrock qualified for a dream championship decider again in 1923, however, "the Barr's" were not granted a walkover on this occasion. After a fierce hour of hurling St Finbarr's narrowly won by 0–6 to 1–2, with O'Connell collecting a second championship medal.

After two years of Blackrock dominance, both sides faced off against each other in the 1926 decider. Blackrock, containing ten of the side that had represented Cork in the All-Ireland decider just a short few weeks beforehand, were deemed unstoppable as they set out to secure a third successive title. A narrow 6–2 to 5–4 victory for St Finbarr's gave O'Connell a third championship medal.

In 1932 St Finbarr's bounced back to reach the championship decider once again. Carrigtwohill provided the opposition, however, the Barr's played with a strong wind in the first half and were 2–1 ahead before Carrig's first score. St Finbarr's built up a considerable lead at the interval and got another soft goal in the opening minutes of the second half, to lead by fourteen points. For the rest of the match though Carrig fought back. In spite of this, a narrow 5–3 to 4–4 score line secured the title for St Finbarr's and a fourth championship medal for O'Connell.

Both O'Connell's side and Carrigtwohill met in the county final again in 1933. An exciting game produced a draw. The replay saw St Finbarr's make no mistake. After taking an early lead they powered to a 6–6 to 5–0 victory. It was O'Connell's fifth championship medal.

=== Inter-county ===
==== Beginnings ====
O'Connell made his senior championship debut with Cork on 28 May 1922 in a 5–2 to 1–2 Munster semi-final defeat by Limerick.

After a number of years on the senior team, O'Connell joined the junior team in 1925. He won a Munster medal that year following a 6–3 to 4–2 defeat of Clare in the provincial decider.

==== Period of dominance ====
O'Connell was back on the senior team in time for the 1926 championship. He later won his first Munster medal following a three-game saga with Tipperary, culminating in a 3–6 to 2–4 victory for Cork. O'Connell was confined to the substitutes' bench for Cork's subsequent 4–6 to 2–0 All-Ireland final defeat of Kilkenny.

After being dropped from the team in 1927, O'Connell was back the following year. He later won a second Munster medal following a 6–4 to 2–2 defeat of Clare in a replay. On 9 September 1928 Cork faced Galway in the All-Ireland decider. The Westerners, who got a bye into the final without lifting a hurley, were no match as a rout ensued. "Gah" Ahern ran riot scoring 5–4, a record for an All-Ireland final, as Cork triumphed by 6–12 to 1–0. It was O'Connell's first All-Ireland medal on the field of play.

O'Connell won a third Munster medal as Cork made it four-in-a-row following a 4–6 to 2–3 defeat of Waterford. On 1 September 1929 Cork faced Galway in the All-Ireland final for the second successive year. Little had changed in a year as Cork were on the top of their game again. A rout ensued as "the Rebels" and O'Connell claimed a second All-Ireland medal with a 4–9 to 1–3 victory.

Cork exited the championship at the first hurdle in 1930, however, O'Connell finished the year by winning a National Hurling League medal following a 3–5 to 3–0 defeat of Dublin the decider.

==== Third All-Ireland medal ====
O'Connell won a fourth Munster medal 1in 1931 following a 5–4 to 1–2 defeat of Waterford. 6 September 1931 saw Kilkenny face Cork in the All-Ireland final for the first time in five years. The first half was closely contested, with a goal from "Gah" Ahern helping Cork to a half-time lead of 1–3 to 0–2. Cork stretched the advantage to six points in the second half, but Kilkenny came storming back with a goal and then four points on the trot to take the lead by one point. In the dying moments Cork captain Eudie Coughlan got possession and made his way towards the goal. As he did so he slipped and fell but struck the sliotar while he was down on his knees, and it went over the bar for the equalising point. A 1–6 apiece draw was the result. 11 October 1931 was the date of the replay and proved to be just as exciting a contest as the first game. Kilkenny's Lory Meagher was playing the best hurling of his career at this time and scored a magnificent point from 90 yards out the field. In spite of this great effort a winner couldn't be found and both sides finished level again at 2–5 apiece. After this game officials pressed for extra time, however, Eudie Coughlan rejected this. It was also suggested at a meeting of Central Council that both teams be declared joint champions and that half an All-Ireland medal by given to each player. This motion was later defeated. As the All-Ireland saga went to a third meeting on 1 November 1931, Kilkenny's captain Meagher was ruled out of the game because of broken ribs sustained in the first replay. Such was the esteem in which he was held the game was virtually conceded to Cork since the star player couldn't play. In spite of fielding a younger team, Kilkenny were defeated by Cork on a score line of 5–8 to 3–4. It was O'Connell's third and final All-Ireland medal.

=== Inter-provincial ===
In 1930 O'Connell was chosen on the Munster team that reached the final of the inter-provincial championship. A 4–6 to 2–7 defeat of Leinster gave O'Connell a Railway Cup medal.

== Death ==
On 27 January 1966, O'Connell died from a stroke as a result of diabetes aged 65.

== Honours ==
St Finbarr's

- Cork Senior Hurling Championship (5): 1922, 1923, 1926, 1932, 1933

Cork

- All-Ireland Senior Hurling Championship (4): 1926 (sub), 1928, 1929 (c), 1931
- Munster Senior Hurling Championship (4): 1926 (sub), 1928, 1929, 1931
- National Hurling League (1): 1929–30
- Munster Junior Hurling Championship (1): 1925

Munster

- Railway Cup (1): 1930
