= Paddy Collins =

Irish hurler

Paddy "Fox" Collins
Personal information
- Native name: Pádraig Ó Coileáin (Irish)
- Nickname: Fox
- Born: 12 April 1903 Kinsale, County Cork, Ireland
- Died: 17 February 1995 (aged 91) Wales

Sport
- Sport: Hurling
- Position: Left corner-back
Club
- Years: Club
- 1921–1940: Glen Rovers
Club titles
- Cork titles: 7
Inter-county
Years	County	Apps (scores)
1928–1938	Cork	24 (0-00)
Inter-county titles
- Munster titles: 2
- All-Irelands: 2
- NHL: 1
- All Stars: 1

Paddy "Fox" Collins (12 April 1903 – 17 February 1995) was an Irish hurler who played as a left corner-back for the Cork senior team.

Born in Kinsale, County Cork, Collins first played competitive hurling during his schooling at The North Monastery. He arrived on the inter-county scene at the age of twenty-five when he first linked up with the Cork senior team. He made his senior debut during the 1928 championship. Collins immediately became a regular member of the starting fifteen, and won two All-Ireland medals, two Munster medals and one National Hurling League medal.

As a member of the Munster inter-provincial team on a number of occasions, Collins won one Railway Cup medal. At club level he was a seven-time championship medallist with Glen Rovers.

Throughout his career Collins made 24 championship appearances. He retired from inter-county hurling following the conclusion of the 1938 championship.

In retirement from playing Collins became involved in team management and coaching. He was a selector with six All-Ireland-winning Cork teams between 1941 and 1954.

In 1988, when he was the last surviving member of Cork's 1931 championship triumph, he was the recipient of the GAA All-Time All-Star Award.

== Playing career ==
=== Colleges ===
During his schooling at The North Monastery in Cork, Collins became a key member of the senior hurling team. In 1919 he won a Harty Cup medal following a 3–2 to 2–2 defeat of Cistercian College, Roscrea.

=== Club ===
Collins played his club hurling with Glen Rovers.

In 1924 he was a member of the team when the Glen claimed their first major victory. A defeat of Dohenys, who conceded the match after a fifty minutes due to a huge lead by the Glen, gave Collins a junior championship medal.

The following year, a 7–2 to 2–3 win over Inniscarra gave Collins an intermediate championship medal. The victory also secured senior status for Glen Rovers.

Having lost the senior decider to Blackrock in 1930, it would take four years for the Glen to qualify for a second senior final. A 3–2 to 0–6 defeat of four-in-a-row hopefuls St. Finbarr's gave Collins a senior championship medal. He added a second championship medal to his collection the following year when Carrigtwohill gave Glen Rovers a walkover in the championship decider.

The Glen continued to dominate Cork hurling once again in 1936. In spite of having two players sent off, Collins won a third successive championship medal following a 7–5 to 4–2 defeat of Sarsfield's.

Having been granted a walkover by the same opposition two years earlier, Glen Rovers faced Carrigtwohill in the county decider of 1937. A 3–5 to 1–0 score line gave Collins a fourth championship medal.

In 1938 Glen Rovers set out to make history by besting Blackrock's twenty-five-year-old championship record of successive championship titles. Midleton stood in the way of a fifth successive championship title, however, a comprehensive 5–6 o 1–3 score line secured the victory and gave Collins his fifth championship.

The following year Glen Rovers faced Blackrock in their first championship decider meeting in almost a decade. A 5–4 to 2–5 win for the Glen gave Collins a sixth successive championship medal.

Sarsfield's stood in the way of Glen Rovers securing a seventh successive championship in 1940. In one of the most high-scoring county finals of all time, Collins won his seventh championship medal following a 10–6 to 7–5 defeat of Sars. Collins brought the curtain down on his club hurling career following this victory.

=== Inter-county ===
Collins made his senior championship debut for Cork in a Munster semi-final defeat of Waterford in 1928. He was dropped from the panel for the rest of the championship as Cork went on to claim the Munster and All-Ireland crowns.

After being reinstated to the starting fifteen in 1929, Collins went on to line out in his first provincial decider. A 4–6 to 2–3 defeat of Waterford gave him his first Munster medal. The subsequent All-Ireland final was a replay of the previous year as Cork lined out Galway once again. Mick Ahern scored a goal for Cork after just twenty-five seconds to start the rout. Cork won by 4–9 to 1–3 giving Collins his first All-Ireland medal.

Collins added a National Hurling League medal to his collection in 1930 as Cork defeated Dublin by 3–5 to 3–0. Cork later surrendered their provincial and All-Ireland crowns.

In 1931 Cork were back in the provincial decider against Waterford, however, the game ended in a draw. A 5–4 to 1–2 victory for Cork in the replay gave Collins a second Munster medal. The subsequent All-Ireland final pitted Cork against Kilkenny. As the final whistle approached Cork were in arrears by one point when Eudie Coughlan took off for goal along the wing. He stumbled and fell to his knees, but struck the sliotar while still on his knees and sent it over the bar the level the game at 1–6 apiece and secure a draw. The replay took place four weeks later. Cork took the lead at half-time, however, Kilkenny fought back. Once again both sides finished level at 2–5 apiece. After this game officials pressed for extra time, however, this was rejected by both sides. It was also suggested at a meeting of the Central Council that both counties be declared joint champions and that half an All-Ireland medal by given to each player. This motion was later defeated. The first week of November saw the second replay of the All-Ireland final take place. The absence of Kilkenny captain Lory Meagher hampered Kilkenny and, at the third attempt, Cork triumphed by 5–8 to 3–4. It was Collins's second All-Ireland medal.

The rest of the decade proved difficult as Cork went into decline. A defeat by Clare in the provincial final of 1932 was Collins's last big occasion with Cork. He continued to play with further success until his retirement after Cork's exit from the championship in 1938.

=== Inter-provincial ===
Collins was also selected for Munster in the inter-provincial series of games. He made his debut with the province in 1931 and was a regular until his retirement in 1933.

In 1931 he lined out in his first inter-provincial decider. A 1–12 to 2–6 defeat of rivals Leinster gave Murphy Collins first Railway Cup medal. He lined out again in the deciders of 1932 and 1933, however, Leinster triumphed on both occasions.

== Honours ==
=== Team ===
North Monastery

- Dr Harty Cup (1): 1919

Glen Rovers

- Cork Senior Hurling Championship (7): 1934, 1935, 1936, 1937, 1938, 1939, 1940
- Cork Intermediate Hurling Championship (1): 1925
- Cork Junior Hurling Championship (1): 1924

Cork

- All-Ireland Senior Hurling Championship (2): 1929, 1931
- Munster Senior Hurling Championship (2): 1929, 1931
- National Hurling League (1): 1929–30

Munster

- Railway Cup (1): 1931

=== Selector ===
Cork

- All-Ireland Senior Hurling Championship (6): 1941, 1942, 1946, 1952, 1953, 1954

=== Individual ===
Awards

- GAA All-Time All-Star Award (1): 1988

Awards
Preceded by Christy Moylan (Waterford)	GAA All-Time All-Star Award; 1988	Succeeded by M.J. 'Inky' Flaherty (Galway)
