= Dinny Barry-Murphy =

Irish hurler

Personal information
- Native name: Donnacha de Barra-Murchu (Irish)
- Nickname: Dinny
- Born: 17 July 1903 Cloughduv, County Cork, Ireland
- Died: 21 August 1973 (aged 70) Cork, Ireland
- Occupation: Company director
- Height: 5 ft 8 in (173 cm)

Sport
- Sport: Hurling
- Position: Centre-back
Clubs
- Years: Club
- Cloughduv; Éire Óg; St Finbarr's
Club titles
- Cork titles: 1
College
- Years: College
- 1922-1928: University College Cork
College titles
- Fitzgibbon titles: 2
Inter-county
Years	County	Apps (scores)
1926-1935	Cork	35 (1-10)
Inter-county titles
- Munster titles: 5
- All-Irelands: 4
- NHL: 2

Dinny Barry-Murphy (17 July 1903 – 21 August 1973) was an Irish hurler who played as a centre-back for the Cork senior team.

Born in Cloughduv, County Cork, Barry-Murphy first played competitive hurling during his schooling at St Finbarr's College, Farranferris. He arrived on the inter-county scene at the age of twenty when he first linked up with the Cork junior team before later joining the senior side. He made his senior debut during the 1926 championship. Barry-Murphy immediately became a regular member of the starting fifteen, and won four All-Ireland medals, five Munster medals and two National Hurling League medals. The All-Ireland-winning captain of 1929, he was an All-Ireland runner-up on one occasion.

At international level Barry-Murphy played for the victorious Tailteann Games hurling team in 1932. As a member of the Munster inter-provincial team on a number of occasions, he won five Railway Cup medals. At club level Barry-Murphy was a one-time championship medallist with Éire Óg, while he also played with Cloughduv and St. Finbarr's.

His brothers, John, Barry and Neil, all played for Cork, while his grand-nephew, Jimmy Barry-Murphy, is regarded as one of the most iconic players of all-time.

Throughout his career Barry-Murphy made 35 championship appearances. He retired from inter-county hurling following the conclusion of the 1935 championship.

In retirement from playing Barry-Murphy became involved in team management and coaching. He was a selector with three All-Ireland-winning Cork teams between 1941 and 1944.

== Early and personal life ==
Born in Cloughduv, County Cork, Barry-Murphy was the second youngest child born to John and Katie Barry-Murphy. He was educated at the local national school before later boarding at St. Finbarr's College in Cork. Here he played on all the top college teams and enjoyed much success. Barry-Murphy later worked as an employer and director with the Cork Farmers Union – a meat processing company.

Dinny Barry-Murphy died on 21 August 1973 following a short illness.

== Playing career ==
=== Club ===
Barry-Murphy began his club hurling career with Cloughduv, however, a merger with various local clubs in 1928 led to the formation of Éire Óg. The newly formed club, with Barry-Murphy as a key member, entered the senior ranks in their inaugural campaign, winning the championship after a 5-2 to 3-2 defeat of Mallow in the decider.

By 1932 Barry-Murphy had joined the St Finbarr's club, however, after a disappointing few years with the club he rejoined the Cloughduv team in 1935.

In the twilight of his career Barry-Murphy helped Cloughduv to some successes. In 1940 a 10-00 to 5-1 win over Newtownshandrum gave him a sought-after championship medal in the junior grade.

The following year Barry-Murphy added a championship medal in the intermediate grade to his collection, following Cloughduv's 6-4 to 3-0 defeat of Buttevant. This win meant that Barry-Murphy is one of the few hurlers to have made a clean sweep of junior, intermediate and senior championship medals.

=== Inter-county ===
==== Cork junior ====
Barry-Murphy first appeared for Cork as a member of the junior team in 1923. He won a Munster medal that year following an 8-4 to 5-1 defeat of Tipperary in the decider. Barry-Murphy was at centre-forward for the subsequent All-Ireland decider, which was delayed by over a year. A narrow 3-4 to 3-2 defeat by Offaly denied Barry-Murphy a winners' medal on that occasion.

After provincial defeat the following year, the Cork junior team bounced back in 1925. Barry-Murphy won a second Munster medal that year following a 6-3 to 4-2 defeat of Clare in the decider. The subsequent All-Ireland decider, which was once again delayed by almost a year, saw Cork defeat Dublin by 5-6 to 1-0, giving Barry-Murphy an All-Ireland Junior Hurling Championship medal.

==== Early success ====
Barry-Murphy was a regular for Cork during the 1925-26 league, the inaugural running of the competition, and collected a first National Hurling League medal following a 3-7 to 1-5 defeat of Dublin in the decider. He made his senior championship debut on 30 May 1926 in a 12-3 to 5-2 Munster quarter-final defeat of Waterford. Barry-Murphy later won his first Munster medal following a three-game saga with Tipperary, culminating in a 3-6 to 2-4 victory for Cork. On 24 October 1926 he lined out in his first senior All-Ireland decider, as Cork faced Kilkenny for the first time since 1912. At a snow-covered Croke Park, the first half was even enough with Cork holding an interval lead of one point, however, Kilkenny slumped in the second half, going down to a 4-6 to 2-0 defeat. It was Barry-Murphy's first All-Ireland medal.

Cork retained the provincial crown in 1927, with Barry-Murphy collecting a second Munster medal following a 5-3 to 3-4 defeat of Clare. He was switched to full-back for Cork's subsequent All-Ireland meeting with Dublin on 4 September 1927. The Metropolitans were well on top in the opening thirty minutes and took a 2-3 to 0-1 lead at the interval. Cork fought back in the third quarter, however, an expert display of goalkeeping by Tommy Daly saved the day by keeping Mick "Gah" Ahern scoreless, as Dublin went on to win by 4-8 to 1-3.

==== Continued dominance ====
In 1928 Barry-Murphy won a third Munster medal following a 6-4 to 2-2 defeat of Clare in a replay. On 9 September 1928 Cork faced Galway in the All-Ireland decider. The Westerners, who got a bye into the final without lifting a hurley, were no match as a rout ensued. "Gah" Ahern ran riot scoring 5-4, a record for an All-Ireland final, as Cork triumphed by 6-12 to 1-0. It was Barry-Murphy's second All-Ireland medal.

Barry-Murphy was appointed captain of the team in 1929 and won a fourth successive Munster medal as Cork made it four-in-a-row following a 4-6 to 2-3 defeat of Waterford. On 1 September 1929 Cork faced Galway in the All-Ireland final for the second successive year. Little had changed in a year as Cork were on the top of their game again. A rout ensued as "the Rebels" and Barry-Murphy claimed a third All-Ireland title from four final appearances with a 4-9 to 1-3 victory. He also had the honour of lifting the Liam MacCarthy Cup.

Cork exited the championship at the first hurdle in 1930, however, Barry-Murphy finished the year by winning a second league medal following a 3-5 to 3-0 defeat of Dublin the decider.

==== Fourth All-Ireland medal ====
Barry-Murphy won a fifth Munster medal 1in 1931 following a 5-4 to 1-2 defeat of Waterford. 6 September 1931 saw Kilkenny face Cork in the All-Ireland final for the first time in five years. The first half was closely contested, with a goal from "Gah" Ahern helping Cork to a half-time lead of 1-3 to 0-2. Cork stretched the advantage to six points in the second half, but Kilkenny came storming back with a goal and then four points on the trot to take the lead by one point. In the dying moments Cork captain Eudie Coughlan got possession and made his way towards the goal. As he did so he slipped and fell but struck the sliotar while he was down on his knees, and it went over the bar for the equalising point. A 1-6 apiece draw was the result. 11 October 1931 was the date of the replay and proved to be just as exciting a contest as the first game. Kilkenny's Lory Meagher was playing the best hurling of his career at this time and scored a magnificent point from 90 yards out the field. In spite of this great effort a winner couldn’t be found and both sides finished level again at 2-5 apiece. After this game officials pressed for extra time, however, Eudie Coughlan rejected this. It was also suggested at a meeting of Central Council that both teams be declared joint champions and that half an All-Ireland medal by given to each player. This motion was later defeated. As the All-Ireland saga went to a third meeting on 1 November 1931, Kilkenny's captain Meagher was ruled out of the game because of broken ribs sustained in the first replay. Such was the esteem in which he was held the game was virtually conceded to Cork since the star player couldn't play. In spite of fielding a younger team, Kilkenny were defeated by Cork on a score line of 5-8 to 3-4. It was Barry-Murphy's fourth and final All-Ireland medal.

On 28 July 1935 Barry-Murphy played his last game for Cork in a 3-12 to 2-3 Munster semi-final defeat by Limerick

=== Inter-provincial ===
In 1927 Barry-Murphy was chosen on the inaugural Munster inter-provincial team which narrowly fell to Leinster in the decider.

Barry-Murphy was included on the team once again in 1928. A 5-3 to 3-1 defeat of arch rivals Leinster gave him his first Railway Cup medal. It was the start of a great run of success for the province as three further final defeats of Leinster brought Barry-Murphy's medal tally to four.

Defeat was Barry-Murphy's lot over the next two years, however, the team bounced back in 1934. A convincing 6-3 to 3-2 victory gave him a fifth and final Railway Cup medal.

=== International ===
In 1932 Barry-Murphy's prowess as one of the top players of his era was recognised when he was chosen for the Ireland national hurling team for the Tailteann Games. A defeat of Scotland, whose players relied on their shinty, gave him a winners' medal.

== Selector ==
In retirement from playing Barry-Murphy was added to the six-man Cork senior hurling selection team in 1941. An outbreak of foot and mouth disease severely hampered that year's championship. As a result of this Cork were nominated to represent the province in the All-Ireland series and faced Dublin in the decider on 28 September 1941. A huge 5-11 to 0-6 victory gave Cork the All-Ireland title, their first in ten years.

Barry-Murphy had no involvement with the team in 1942, however, he was back as a selector once again the following year. A 2-13 to 3-8 defeat of Waterford gave Cork the Munster crown, before later facing first-time finalists Antrim in the All-Ireland decider on 5 September 1943. Cork built up an unassailable half-time lead over Antrim and the final score of 5-16 to 0-4 gave Cork their second-ever hat-trick of All-Ireland titles.

In 1944, Cork were attempting to capture a fourth All-Ireland title in-a-row. No team in the history of the hurling championship had won more than three consecutive titles. The year got off to a good start when Cork defeated Limerick by 4-6 to 3-6 after a replay of the provincial decider. For the third time in four years Cork faced Dublin in an All-Ireland decider. Joe Kelly was the hero of the day and he contributed greatly to Cork's 2-13 to 1-2 victory. It was a fourth successive All-Ireland title for Cork, Barry-Murphy's third as a selector.

== Honours ==
=== Player ===
University College Cork

- Fitzgibbon Cup (2): 1925, 1928

Cloughduv

- Cork Intermediate Hurling Championship (1): 1941
- Cork Junior Hurling Championship (1): 1940

Éire Óg

- Cork Senior Hurling Championship (1): 1928

Cork

- All-Ireland Senior Hurling Championship (4): 1926, 1928, 1929 (c), 1931
- Munster Senior Hurling Championship (5): 1926, 1927, 1928, 1929 (c), 1931
- National Hurling League (2): 1925-26, 1929-30
- All-Ireland Junior Hurling Championship (1): 1925
- Munster Junior Hurling Championship (2): 1923, 1925

Munster

- Railway Cup (5): 1928, 1929, 1930 (c), 1931, 1934

Ireland

- Tailteann Games (1): 1932

=== Selector ===
Cork

- All-Ireland Senior Hurling Championship (3): 1941, 1943, 1944
- Munster Senior Hurling Championship (2): 1943, 1944

Sporting positions
Preceded by Seán Óg Murphy	Cork Senior Hurling Captain; 1929	Succeeded by Eudie Coughlan
Achievements
Preceded by Seán Óg Murphy (Cork)	All-Ireland Senior Hurling Final winning captain 1929	Succeeded by John Joe Callinan (Tipperary)
Preceded by Seán Óg Murphy (Munster)	Railway Cup Hurling Final winning captain 1930	Succeeded by Phil Purcell (Munster)
