= Morgan Madden =

Irish hurler

Personal information
- Native name: Murcha Ó Madáin (Irish)
- Born: 8 April 1906 Turners Cross, Cork, Ireland
- Died: January 1962 (aged 55) London, England

Sport
- Sport: Hurling
- Position: Right corner-back
Club
- Years: Club
- Redmonds
Club titles
- Cork titles: 0
Inter-county
Years	County	Apps (scores)
1928-1932	Cork	18 (0-00)
Inter-county titles
- Munster titles: 3
- All-Irelands: 3
- NHL: 1

Morgan Madden (8 April 1906 - January 1962) was an Irish hurler who played as a right corner-back for the Cork senior team.

Born in Turners Cross, Cork, Madden first arrived on the inter-county scene at the age of twenty-two when he first linked up with the Cork senior team. He made his senior debut during the 1928 championship. Madden immediately became a regular member of the starting fifteen, and won three All-Ireland medals, three Munster medals and one National Hurling League medal.

At club level Madden played with Redmonds.

Throughout his career Madden made 18 championship appearances. He retired from inter-county hurling following the conclusion of the 1932 championship.

== Playing career ==
=== Inter-county ===
Madden made his senior championship debut for Cork on a 15 July 1928 in a 2-2 apiece Munster final draw with the Clare. He retained his place on the starting fifteen for the replay a fortnight later. Cork won that game by 6–4 to 2-2, giving Madden a first Munster medal. On 9 September 1928 Cork faced Galway in the All-Ireland decider. The Westerners, who got a bye into the final without lifting a hurley, were no match as a rout ensued. Mick "Gah" Ahern ran riot scoring 5–4, a record for an All-Ireland final, as Cork triumphed by 6–12 to 1–0. It was Madden's first All-Ireland medal.

Madden won a second Munster medal in 1929 as Cork made it four-in-a-row following a 4–6 to 2–3 defeat of Waterford. On 1 September 1929 Cork faced Galway in the All-Ireland final for the second successive year. Little had changed in a year as Cork were on the top of their game again. A rout ensued as "the Rebels" and Madden claimed a second All-Ireland title following a 4–9 to 1–3 victory.

Cork exited the championship at the first hurdle in 1930, however, Madden finished the year by winning a second league medal following a 3–5 to 3–0 defeat of Dublin the decider.

Madden won a third Munster medal in 1931 following a 5–4 to 1–2 defeat of Waterford. 6 September 1931 saw Kilkenny face Cork in the All-Ireland final for the first time in five years. The first half was closely contested, with a goal from "Gah" Ahern helping Cork to a half-time lead of 1–3 to 0–2. Cork stretched the advantage to six points in the second half, but Kilkenny came storming back with a goal and then four points on the trot to take the lead by one point. In the dying moments Cork captain Eudie Coughlan got possession and made his way towards the goal. As he did so he slipped and fell but struck the sliotar while he was down on his knees, and it went over the bar for the equalising point. A 1-6 apiece draw was the result. 11 October 1931 was the date of the replay and proved to be just as exciting a contest as the first game. Kilkenny's Lory Meagher was playing the best hurling of his career at this time and scored a magnificent point from 90 yards out the field. In spite of this great effort a winner couldn't be found and both sides finished level again at 2-5 apiece. After this game officials pressed for extra time, however, Eudie Coughlan rejected this. It was also suggested at a meeting of Central Council that both teams be declared joint champions and that half an All-Ireland medal by given to each player. This motion was later defeated. As the All-Ireland saga went to a third meeting on 1 November 1931, Kilkenny's captain Meagher was ruled out of the game because of broken ribs sustained in the first replay. Such was the esteem in which he was held the game was virtually conceded to Cork since the star player couldn't play. In spite of fielding a younger team, Kilkenny were defeated by Cork on a score line of 5–8 to 3–4. It was Madden's third and final All-Ireland medal.

Madden brought the curtain down on his inter-county career following Cork's exit from the 1932 championship.

== Honours ==
=== Team ===
Cork

- All-Ireland Senior Hurling Championship (3): 1928, 1929, 1931
- Munster Senior Hurling Championship (3): 1928, 1929, 1931
- National Hurling League (1): 1929-30
