= John Coughlan (hurler) =

Irish hurler (1898–1965)

Personal information
- Native name: Seán Mac Cochláin (Irish)
- Nickname: Ballyhea
- Born: 18 August 1898 Blackrock, County Cork, Ireland
- Died: 18 August 1965 (aged 67) Blackrock, County Cork, Ireland
- Occupation: Cork Harbour Board employee

Sport
- Sport: Hurling
- Position: Goalkeeper
Club
- Years: Club
- Blackrock
Club titles
- Cork titles: 7
Inter-county
Years	County	Apps (scores)
1925-1931	Cork	15 (0-00)
Inter-county titles
- Munster titles: 2
- All-Irelands: 2
- NHL: 2

John "Ballyhea" Coughlan (18 August 1898 – 18 August 1965) was an Irish hurler who played as a goalkeeper for the Cork senior team.

Born in Blackrock, County Cork, Coughlan first played competitive hurling in his youth. He arrived on the inter-county scene at the age of 27, when he first linked up with the Cork senior team. He made his senior debut during the 1925 championship. Coughlan later became a regular member of the starting fifteen, and won two All-Ireland medals, two Munster medals and two National Hurling League medals.

At club level, Coughlan was a seven-time championship medallist with Blackrock.

His father, Pat, uncles, Tom, Denis and Dan, and brother, Eudie, were all hurlers.

Coughlan made a total of 15 championship appearances. He retired from inter-county hurling after the 1931 championship.

== Playing career ==
=== Club ===
In 1920, Coughlan was a key member of the Blackrock senior hurling team. He won his first championship medal that year following a comfortable 14–4 to 2-0 win over Fairhill.

Four years later, Coughlan won his second championship medal following a 3–5 to 1–2 defeat of Redmonds.

Coughlan collected a third championship medal in 1925 when Blackrock defeated St. Finbarr's by 6–4 to 2–3.

Three-in-a-row proved beyond Blackrock, however, in 1927 they were back in a fourth successive decider. A 5–5 to 2–1 defeat of Redmonds gave Coughlan a fourth championship medal.

After a one-year hiatus "the Rockies" were back in the county decider once again in 1929. A 5–6 to 2–2 defeat of St. Finbarr's gave Coughlan a fifth championship medal. It was the beginning of a great era of success for the club as further final victories over Glen Rovers in 1930 and Éire Óg in 1931 brought Coughlan's championship medal tally to seven.

=== Inter-county ===
Coughlan made his senior championship debut for Cork on 19 May 1925 in a 4–9 to 1-3 Munster quarter-final defeat of Limerick. He was dropped from the starting for the semi-final, a game Cork narrowly lost to Tipperary.

During the 1925-26 league, the inaugural running of the competition, Coughlan was a regular starter for Cork and collected a first National Hurling League medal following a 3–7 to 1–5 defeat of Dublin in the decider. He later won his first Munster medal following a three-game saga with Tipperary, culminating in a 3–6 to 2–4 victory for Cork. On 24 October 1926 Coughlan lined out in his first All-Ireland decider, as Cork faced Kilkenny for the first time since 1912. At a snow-covered Croke Park, the first half was even enough with Cork holding an interval lead of one point, however, Kilkenny slumped in the second half, going down to a 4–6 to 2–0 defeat. It was Coughlan's first All-Ireland medal.

After being dropped from the Cork team for the next three seasons, Coughlan returned as sub goalkeeper in 1930. Cork exited the championship at the first hurdle that year, however, he finished the year by winning a second league medal following a 3–5 to 3–0 defeat of Dublin the decider.

Coughlan was back as first-choice goalkeeper for the 1931 championship campaign. He won a second Munster medal that year following a 5–4 to 1–2 defeat of Waterford. 6 September 1931 saw Kilkenny face Cork in the All-Ireland final for the first time in five years. The first half was closely contested, with a goal from Mick "Gah" Ahern helping Cork to a half-time lead of 1–3 to 0–2. Cork stretched the advantage to six points in the second half, but Kilkenny came storming back with a goal and then four points on the trot to take the lead by one point. In the dying moments Cork captain Eudie Coughlan got possession and made his way towards the goal. As he did so he slipped and fell but struck the sliotar while he was down on his knees, and it went over the bar for the equalising point. A 1-6 apiece draw was the result. 11 October 1931 was the date of the replay and proved to be just as exciting a contest as the first game. Kilkenny's Lory Meagher was playing the best hurling of his career at this time and scored a magnificent point from 90 yards out the field. In spite of this great effort a winner couldn't be found and both sides finished level again at 2-5 apiece. After this game officials pressed for extra time, however, Eudie Coughlan rejected this. It was also suggested at a meeting of Central Council that both teams be declared joint champions and that half an All-Ireland medal by given to each player. This motion was later defeated. As the All-Ireland saga went to a third meeting on 1 November 1931, Kilkenny's captain Meagher was ruled out of the game because of broken ribs sustained in the first replay. Such was the esteem in which he was held the game was virtually conceded to Cork since the star player couldn't play. In spite of fielding a younger team, Kilkenny were defeated by Cork on a score line of 5–8 to 3–4. It was Coughlan fourth and final All-Ireland medal.

== Death ==
On 18 August 1965, Couglan died from a pulmonary embolism aged 67 at the Mercy Hospital in Cork.

== Honours ==
=== Team ===
Blackrock

- Cork Senior Hurling Championship (7): 1920, 1924, 1925, 1927, 1929, 1930, 1931

Cork

- All-Ireland Senior Hurling Championship (2): 1926, 1931
- Munster Senior Hurling Championship (2): 1926, 1931
- National Hurling League (2): 1925-26, 1929-30
