= Willie Clancy (hurler) =

Irish hurler from Cork

Personal information
- Native name: Liam Mac Lannchaidh (Irish)
- Born: 17 June 1906 Mallow, County Cork, Ireland
- Died: 14 December 1967 (aged 61) Mallow, County Cork, Ireland
- Occupation: ESB employee

Sport
- Sport: Hurling
- Position: Left corner-forward
Club
- Years: Club
- Mallow
Club titles
- Cork titles: 0
Inter-county*
Years	County	Apps (scores)
1928-1934	Cork	15 (7-03)
Inter-county titles
- Munster titles: 2
- All-Irelands: 2
- NHL: 1
- *Inter County team apps and scores correct as of 18:40, 3 May 2015.

William John Clancy (17 June 1906 – 14 December 1967) was an Irish hurler who played as a left corner-forward for the Cork senior team.

Born in Mallow, County Cork, Clancy first arrived on the inter-county scene at the age of twenty-one when he first linked up with the Cork senior team. He joined the senior panel during the 1928 championship. Clancy subsequently became a regular member of the starting fifteen, and won one All-Ireland medal, one Munster medal and one National Hurling League medal.

Clancy was a member of the Munster inter-provincial team on a number of occasions, however, he never won a Railway Cup medal. At club level Clancy enjoyed a lengthy career with Mallow.

Throughout his career Clancy made 15 championship appearances. He retired from inter-county hurling following the conclusion of the 1934 championship.

== Playing career ==
=== Club ===
Clancy played his club hurling with his local club in Mallow. The high point of his career, and indeed the highpoint of the club's history, came in 1928 when Mallow played Éire Óg in the final of the senior county championship. Mallow, however, lost on that occasion.

=== Inter-county ===
Clancy first came to prominence on the inter-county scene as a member of the extended Cork panel in 1929. He was an unused substitute that year as Cork claimed Munster and All-Ireland honours following respective defeats of Waterford and Galway.

On 6 July 1930 Clancy made his senior championship debut in a 6–6 to 5-6 Munster semi-final defeat by Clare. In spite of this defeat he finished off the year by winning a National Hurling League medal following a 3–5 to 3–0 defeat of Dublin the decider.

Clancy won his first Munster medal on the field of play in 1931 following a 5–4 to 1–2 defeat of Waterford. 6 September 1931 saw Kilkenny face Cork in the All-Ireland final for the first time in five years. The first half was closely contested, with a goal from "Gah" Ahern helping Cork to a half-time lead of 1–3 to 0–2. Cork stretched the advantage to six points in the second half, but Kilkenny came storming back with a goal and then four points on the trot to take the lead by one point. In the dying moments Cork captain Eudie Coughlan got possession and made his way towards the goal. As he did so he slipped and fell but struck the sliotar while he was down on his knees, and it went over the bar for the equalising point. A 1-6 apiece draw was the result. 11 October 1931 was the date of the replay and proved to be just as exciting a contest as the first game. Kilkenny's Lory Meagher was playing the best hurling of his career at this time and scored a magnificent point from 90 yards out the field. In spite of this great effort a winner couldn't be found and both sides finished level again at 2-5 apiece. After this game officials pressed for extra time, however, Eudie Coughlan rejected this. It was also suggested at a meeting of Central Council that both teams be declared joint champions and that half an All-Ireland medal by given to each player. This motion was later defeated. As the All-Ireland saga went to a third meeting on 1 November 1931, Kilkenny's captain Meagher was ruled out of the game because of broken ribs sustained in the first replay. Such was the esteem in which he was held the game was virtually conceded to Cork since the star player couldn't play. In spite of fielding a younger team, Kilkenny were defeated by Cork on a score line of 5–8 to 3–4. The victory gave Clancy an All-Ireland medal on the field of play.

On 8 July 1934 Clancy played his last game for Cork in a 3–4 to 2-2 Munster semi-final defeat by Limerick

=== Inter-provincial ===
Clancy also lined out with Munster in the inter-provincial hurling competition. He first played for his province in 1932, however, Munster were defeated by Leinster in the final of the Railway Cup. Clancy lined out again in 1933, however, Leinster triumphed once again.

== Personal life and death ==
Clancy was born in Mallow, County Cork, the second of six children of County Leitrim-born William and Julia (née Callaghan). After completing his education, he worked with the Electricity Supply Board. Clancy married Abina O'Sullivan in September 1933.

On 14 December 1967, Clancy died from colon cancer aged 61.

== Honours ==
Cork

- All-Ireland Senior Hurling Championship (2): 1929 (sub), 1931
- Munster Senior Hurling Championship (2): 1929 (sub), 1931
- National Hurling League (1): 1929-30
