= Peter O'Reilly (hurler) =

Irish hurler

Personal information
- Native name: Peadar Ó Raghallaigh (Irish)
- Born: 29 September 1902 Kilkenny, Ireland
- Died: 25 February 1940 (aged 37) Kilkenny, Ireland
- Occupation: Baker

Sport
- Sport: Hurling
- Position: Full-back
Club
- Years: Club
- 1925-1939: Dicksboro
Club titles
- Kilkenny titles: 1
Inter-county
- Years: County
- 1926-1936: Kilkenny
Inter-county titles
- Leinster titles: 6
- All-Irelands: 3
- NHL: 1

Peter O'Reilly (29 September 1902 – 25 February 1940) was an Irish hurler who played as a full-back for the Kilkenny senior team.

Born in Kilkenny, O'Reilly arrived on the inter-county scene at the age of twenty-three when he first linked up with the Kilkenny senior team. He made his debut in the 1925-26 National League. O'Reilly went on to play a key part for more than a decade, and won three All-Ireland medals, six Leinster medals and one National Hurling League medal. O'Reilly was an All-Ireland runner-up on three occasions.

O'Reilly represented the Leinster inter-provincial team at various times throughout his career, winning two Railway Cup medals in 1932 and 1933. At club level he won one championship medals with Dicksboro.

Following Kilkenny's defeat by Limerick in the 1936 championship, O'Reilly retired from inter-county hurling.

== Playing career ==
=== Inter-county ===
O'Reilly made his senior inter-county debut for Kilkenny in a National League defeat by Dublin on 26 March 1926. Although he missed Kilkenny's subsequent championship defeat of Dublin, O'Reilly was named at full-back for the provincial decider. He won his first Leinster medal as Offaly were accounted for by 3-8 to 1-4. On 24 October 1926 he lined out in his first All-Ireland decider, with Cork providing the opposition. At a snow-covered Croke Park, the first half was even enough with Cork holding an interval lead of one point, however, Kilkenny slumped in the second half, going down to a 4-6 to 2-0 defeat.

After tamely surrendering their Leinster crown to Dublin the following year, both sides met again in the provincial decider in 1929. Controversy and dissent dogged the game as O'Reilly and his teammates from the Dicksboro club did not play as they disagreed with the selection committee's choice.

The dispute continued for a number of seasons, however, O'Reilly returned for the 1931 championship. A 4-7 to 4-2 defeat of Laois gave O'Reilly his second Leinster medal. 6 September 1931 saw Kilkenny face Cork in the All-Ireland final for the first time in five years. The first half was closely contested, with a goal from Mick Ahern helping Cork to a half-time lead of 1-3 to 0-2. Cork stretched the advantage to six points in the second half, but Kilkenny came storming back with a goal and then four points on the trot to take the lead by one point. In the dying moments Eudie Coughlan got possession and made his way towards the goal. As he did so he slipped and fell but struck the sliotar while he was down on his knees, and it went over the bar for the equalising point. A 1-6 apiece draw was the result. 11 October 1931 was the date of the replay and proved to be just as exciting a contest as the first game. In spite of a great effort a winner couldn't be found and both sides finished level again at 2-5 apiece. After this game officials pressed for extra time, however, Cork captain Eudie Coughlan rejected this. It was also suggested at a meeting of Central Council that both teams be declared joint champions and that half an All-Ireland medal by given to each player. This motion was later defeated. As the All-Ireland saga went to a third meeting on 1 November 1931, Kilkenny captain Lory Meagher was ruled out of the game because of broken ribs sustained in the first replay. Such was the esteem in which he was held the game was virtually conceded to Cork. In spite of fielding a younger team, Kilkenny were defeated by Cork on a score line of 5-8 to 3-4.

Kilkenny retained their provincial crown in 1932, with O'Reilly adding a third Leinster medal to his collection following a 4-6 to 3-5 defeat of Dublin. The All-Ireland final on 4 September 1932 saw Clare provide the opposition for the first time in almost twenty years. In a low-scoring game, Clare's Tull Considine scored two goals and was foiled for what would almost certainly have been a third. These goals were negated by Kilkenny's three goal-scoring heroes Matty Power, Martin White and Lory Meagher, who scored a remarkable goal from a line ball. The final score of 3-3 to 2-3 gave victory to Kilkenny and gave O'Reilly an All-Ireland medal.

1933 saw O'Reilly add a National Hurling League medal to his collection following a 3-8 to 1-3 defeat of Limerick. He later won a fourth Leinster medal following a stunning comeback against Dublin. The All-Ireland final on 3 September 1933 saw a record crowd of 45,176 travel to Croke Park to see Kilkenny face and up-and-coming Limerick. After being level at the interval, the game remained close in the second half until a solo-run goal by Johnny Dunne sealed a 1-7 to 0-6 victory. It was O'Reilly's second consecutive All-Ireland medal.

After surrendering their provincial crown to Dublin in 1934, Kilkenny faced Laois in the decider again the following year. A 3-8 to 0-6 victory gave O'Reilly a fifth Leinster medal. Another record crowd gathered at Croke Park for the All-Ireland final between Kilkenny and Limerick on 1 September 1935. In spite of rain falling throughout the entire game both sides served up a classic. At the beginning of the second-half Lory Meagher sent over a huge point from midfield giving Kilkenny a lead which they wouldn't surrender. A narrow 2-5 to 2-4 victory gave O'Reilly a third All-Ireland medal.

Kilkenny dominated the provincial series again in 1936 and O'Reilly won his sixth Leinster medal following a 4-6 to 2-5 defeat of Laois. The lure of a Kilkenny-Limerick clash brought a record crowd of over 50,000 to Croke Park for the All-Ireland decider on 6 September 1936. The first half produced a game that lived up to the previous clashes, and Limerick had a two point advantage at half-time. In the second half Limerick took over and O'Reilly's side were completely outclassed on a 5-6 to 1-5 score line. Following this defeat O'Reilly brought the curtain down on his inter-county career.

=== Inter-provincial ===
O'Reilly also had the honour of lining out with Leinster in the inter-provincial series of games.

After being an unused substitute for Leinster's inaugural Railway Cup win in 1927, O'Reilly was the first-choice full-back by 1932. He won his first Railway Cup medal on the field of play that year following a 6-8 to 4-4 defeat of Munster.

The province made it two-in-a-row the following year, and a 4-6 to 3-6 defeat of Munster gave O'Reilly a second Railway Cup medal.
