= Michael O'Connell =

Michael O'Connell may refer to:

- Michael O'Connell (artist) (1898–1976), English modernist artist
- Michael O'Connell (footballer) (born 1962), former Australian rules footballer
- Michael O'Connell (politician), Irish Labour Party politician and Lord Mayor of Cork
- Michael O'Connell (botanist), professor of botany, National University of Ireland, Galway
- Michael F. O'Connell (1877–?), Wisconsin politician
- Mike O'Connell (born 1955), former professional ice hockey player and general manager
- Mick O'Connell (born 1937), former Irish Gaelic footballer
- Mick O'Connell (hurler) (1900–1966), Irish hurler in the 1920s and 1930s

== See also ==
- Mike Connell (disambiguation)
