= Dan Coughlan (Blackrock hurler) =

Irish hurler (born 1870)

Personal information
- Native name: Dónall Mac Cochláin (Irish)
- Born: Blackrock, County Cork

Sport
- Sport: Hurling
- Position: Forward
Club
- Years: Club
- 1894-1905: Blackrock
Club titles
- Cork titles: 4
Inter-county
- Years: County
- 1894-1903: Cork
Inter-county titles
- Munster titles: 2
- All-Irelands: 1

Dan Coughlan (born 21 March 1870) was an Irish sportsperson. He played hurling with his local club Blackrock and was a member of the Cork senior inter-county team from 1894 until 1903.

== Biography ==
The Coughlans were a well-known family in Blackrock at the turn of the 20th century. The father, John Coughlan, earned his livelihood as a fisherman. All of his sons would later earn their livings on the sea. The Coughlans also came to be regarded as a famous hurling family in the early years of the championship. Dan Coughlan was the fourth son in the family. He and his four brothers – Pat Coughlan, Denis 'Lyonsie' Coughlan, Jer Coughlan, and Tom 'Honest Man' Coughlan – all played with 'the Rockies' and claimed All-Ireland titles with Cork.

The Coughlan bloodline saw much success also on the hurling field also. His nephews, Eudie and John, went on to win seven All-Ireland medals between them with Cork between 1929 and 1931. His niece, Kitty, won three All-Ireland camogie medals in-a-row between 1939 and 1941. Coughlan's grandnephew continued the hurling tradition by winning a county title with Blackrock in 1961.

== Playing career ==
=== Club ===
Coughlan played his club hurling with the Blackrock National Hurling Club in Cork and had much success. He won his first senior county title in 1894. AT this time Blackrock had become the standard-bearers in the county and Coughlan had further county victories with the club in 1895, 1897, 1898 and 1903.

=== Inter-county ===
Coughlan first came to prominence on the inter-county scene with Cork when he captained the team in 1894. A relatively easy 3–4 to 1–2 defeat of Tipperary in the provincial decider gave him a Munster winners' title. For the second time in three years Dublin provided the opposition for Cork in the subsequent All-Ireland final. The game turned into an absolute rout as Cork won easily by 5–20 to 2–0. The victory gave Coughlan an All-Ireland winners' title.

Coughlan did not take part in any inter-county activity for the next few years, however, in 1902 he was back on the team. He missed the Munster final but returned in time for the All-Ireland 'home' final. Dublin provided the opposition on that occasion, however, the game ended in a draw. Coughlan did not take part in the subsequent replay or the All-Ireland final victory over London.

Coughlan was still a key member of the Cork team again in 1903. That year he collected a second Munster winners’ medal as Cork trounced Waterford by 5–16 to 1-1. He was injured prior to the subsequent All-Ireland final and played no part in Cork's victory over London.

In 1905, when salmon fishing declined on the River Lee, Coughlan emigrated when still in the prime of his hurling career.
