= Tom Barry (Cork hurler) =

Irish hurler

Personal information
- Native name: Tomás de Barra (Irish)
- Born: 18 February 1903 Carrigtwohill, County Cork, Ireland
- Died: 25 April 1984 (aged 81) Carrigtwohill, County Cork, Ireland
- Occupation: Farmer

Sport
- Sport: Hurling
- Position: Left wing-back
Club
- Years: Club
- Carrigtwohill
Club titles
- Cork titles: 0
Inter-county*
Years	County	Apps (scores)
1928-1933	Cork	20 (0-00)
Inter-county titles
- Munster titles: 3
- All-Irelands: 3
- NHL: 1
- *Inter County team apps and scores correct as of 19:43, 3 May 2015.

Thomas Barry (18 February 1903 – 25 April 1984) was an Irish sportsperson. He played hurling with his local club Carrigtwohill and with the Cork senior inter-county team in the 1920s and 1930s.

== Playing career ==
=== Club ===
Barry played his club hurling with his local club in Carrigtwohill club and enjoyed some success. In spite of this he never won a senior county title with the club.

=== Inter-county ===
Barry first came to prominence on the inter-county scene with Cork in the late 1920s. He made his debut in 1928 as Cork faced Clare in the Munster final for the second year in-a-row. That game ended in a draw, however, in the replay Cork triumphed with Barry collecting his first Munster title. Cork later defeated Dublin in the All-Ireland semi-final before lining out against Galway in the championship decider. Galway got a bye into the final without picking up a hurley, however, the game turned into a rout. A score line of 6-12 to 1-0 gave Cork the victory and gave Barry an All-Ireland medal.

In 1929 Cork retained their provincial dominance for a fourth consecutive year. A 4-6 to 2-3 defeat of Waterford gave Barry his second Munster title. The subsequent All-Ireland final was a replay of the previous year's game as Cork played Galway once again. Mick Ahern scored a goal for Cork after just 25 seconds to start another rout. Cork won the day by 4-9 to 1-3 giving Barry his second All-Ireland title.

In 1930 Barry added a National Hurling League title to his collection; however, Cork surrendered their provincial crown later that summer. The team bounced back in 1931 with Barry collecting a third Munster winners’ medal. Once again it took a replay for Cork and Waterford to be separated. The All-Ireland final saw Cork take on Kilkenny for the first time since 1926. After a close game both sides finished level – 1-6 apiece. Eudie Coughlan played a captain's role in that game as he scored a point from his knees to level the scores. The replay of the final took place four weeks later and is regarded as a classic. Cork took the lead at half-time, however, Kilkenny fought back. Once again both sides finished level – 2-5 apiece. After this game officials pressed for extra time, however, this was rejected. It was also suggested at a meeting of the GAA’s Central Council that both counties be declared joint champions and that half an All-Ireland medal by given to each player. This motion was later defeated. The first week of November saw the second replay of the All-Ireland final take place. At the third attempt Cork triumphed by 5-8 to 3-4 giving Barry his third and final All-Ireland medal.
