= Denis Coughlan (Blackrock hurler) =

Irish hurler

Denis 'Lyonsie' Coughlan
Personal information
- Native name: Donnacha Mac Cochláin (Irish)
- Nickname: Lyonsie
- Born: 10 September 1871 Blackrock, Cork
- Died: 24 July 1903 (aged 31) Blackpool, Cork

Sport
- Sport: Hurling
- Position: Forward
Club
- Years: Club
- 18902-1900s: Blackrock
Club titles
- Cork titles: 6
Inter-county
Years	County	Apps (scores)
1891-1892	Cork	3
Inter-county titles
- Munster titles: 1
- All-Irelands: 1

Denis "Lyonsie" Coughlan (10 September 1871 – 24 July 1903) was an Irish sportsperson. He played hurling with his local club Blackrock and was a member of the Cork senior inter-county team from 1891 until 1892.

== Biography ==
The Coughlan family lived in Blackrock, Cork at the turn of the 20th century, and the father, John Coughlan, earned his livelihood as a fisherman. All of his sons would later earn their livings on the sea. The Coughlan's also came to be regarded as a famous hurling family in the early years of the championship. Pat Coughlan was the eldest of the family. He was followed by Denis 'Lyonsie' Coughlan, Jer Coughlan, Dan Coughlan and Tom 'Honest Man' Coughlan who all played with 'the Rockies' and claimed All-Ireland titles with Cork.

Coughlan's nephews, Eudie and John, went on to win seven All-Ireland medals between them with Cork between 1929 and 1931. His niece, Kitty, won three All-Ireland camogie medals in-a-row between 1939 and 1941. Coughlan's grandnephew continued the hurling tradition by winning a county title with Blackrock in 1961.

== Playing career ==
=== Club ===
Coughlan played his club hurling with the famous Blackrock club in Cork and enjoyed much success. He won his first senior county title in 1891. Blackrock quickly became the standard-bearers in the county and Coughlan had further county victories with the famous club in 1893, 1894, 1895, 1897 and 1898.

=== Inter-county ===
Coughlan first came to prominence on the inter-county scene with Cork when he captained the team in 1891. It was an unsuccessful year as Cork were defeated by eventual champions Kerry in their opening game.

Coughlan was on the team again in 1892 and he lined out in his first provincial decider with Kerry providing the opposition. An exciting game developed, however, at full-time Cork were the champions by 5–3 to 2–5. It was Coughlan's first Munster title. Cork's next game was an All-Ireland final meeting with Dublin. The game was a controversial one as referee Dan Fraher changed his mind after initially awarding Michael Brassil a goal to Cork. He eventually decided that the GAA's Central Council should decide the matter. Dublin, however, had walked off the field and, because of this, Cork were awarded the title. It gave Coughlan an All-Ireland title. It was his last appearance with Cork.

== Death ==
Coughlan's life ended in unhappy circumstances. He was badly affected by a training ground incident when, while preparing for a Cork match, he accidentally hit another great player while both were pulling on a dropping ball. The blow from the hurley proved fatal and Coughlan never recovered from this. He died in July 1903.
