= Willie Clancy =

Willie Clancy may refer to:

- Willie Clancy (musician) (1918–1973), Irish uilleann piper
- Willie Clancy (hurler) (1906–1967), Irish hurler

== See also ==
- William Clancy (disambiguation)
