= Mike Connell =

Mike Connell may refer to:

- Mike Connell (musician) (born 1959), leader of The Connells, American band
- Mike Connell (American football) (born 1956), American football player
- Mike Connell (soccer) (born 1956), soccer player in the North American Soccer League
- Michael Connell (judge) (1939–2013), British barrister and judge
- Michael Connell (1963–2008), Republican consultant, subpoenaed in a case regarding alleged tampering with 2004 U.S. presidential election
- Michael Connell (golfer) (born 1975), American professional golfer
- Mick Connell (born 1961), Australian wheelchair tennis player
- Mike Connell, a character in the film Adventureland

== See also ==
- Michael O'Connell (disambiguation)
