= Pat Coughlan =

Irish hurler

Personal information
- Native name: Pádraig Mac Cochláin (Irish)
- Nickname: Parson
- Born: 23 August 1867 Blackrock, County Cork, Ireland
- Died: Unknown
- Occupation: Fisherman

Sport
- Sport: Hurling
- Position: Left wing-back
Club
- Years: Club
- Blackrock
Club titles
- Cork titles: 8
Inter-county
- Years: County
- 1891-1899: Cork
Inter-county titles
- Munster titles: 2
- All-Irelands: 2

Pat "Parson" Coughlan (born 23 August 1867) was an Irish hurler who played as a left wing-back for the Cork senior team.

Coughlan joined the team during the 1891 championship and was a regular member of the starting fifteen until his retirement after the 1899 championship. During that time he won two All-Ireland medals and two Munster medals.

At club level Coughlan was an eight-time county club championship medalist with Blackrock.

== Playing career ==
=== Club ===
Coughlan played his club hurling with the Blackrock GAA club in Cork and enjoyed much success. He won his first senior county title in 1887 as 'the Rockies' captured the very first Cork county title. Coughlan added further county titles to his collection in 1889 and 1891. Blackrock quickly became the standard-bearers in the county and Coughlan had further county victories with the club in 1893, 1894, 1895, 1897 and 1898.

=== Inter-county ===
Coughlan made his first appearance for the Cork senior hurling team during the 1891 championship, however, Cork's campaign ended without success.

Two years later in 1893 Coughlan was back on the Cork team as part of the Blackrock contingent. Cork's opening game was a provincial decider against Limerick. A remarkable 5-3 to no score victory gave Coughlan his first Munster medal. The subsequent All-Ireland final provided the very first championship meeting of Cork and Kilkenny. The game was fixed for Ashtown, however, upon arrival both teams refused to play there as somebody had neglected to cut the grass. After a long delay the goalposts were uprooted and both teams and their supporters headed to the Phoenix Park where the game took place after a long delay. The game itself turned into a rout as Cork scored 6-8 to Kilkenny's 0-2. It was Coughlan's first All-Ireland medal.

Coughlan lined out in a second provincial decider in 1894. A 3-4 to 1-2 defeat of Tipperary gave him a second Munster medal. The subsequent All-Ireland decider saw Dublin provide the opposition. A delay of two hours mattered little to Cork and the team powered to a 5-20 to 2-0 victory. It was one of the most one-sided championship deciders of all-time while it also gave Coughlan his second All-Ireland medal. It was also Cork's third successive All-Ireland title.

Four-in-a-row proved beyond Cork as a dispute over the awarding of the All-Ireland football title in 1894 resulted in Cork leaving the Gaelic Athletic Association in protest.

Coughlan continued to line out with Cork without success until his retirement after the 1899 championship.

== Personal life ==
Born in Blackrock, Coughlan was the eldest of what would become a hurling 'dynasty'. His young brothers, Denis, Jer, Dan and Tom, would all become All-Ireland medalists with Cork.

Coughlan worked as a fisherman and was affectionately knows as Parson. He married Nora Dorney, sister of fellow Blackrock and Cork hurlers "Bill Bill" Dorney and "Down Down" Dorney. Coughlan's sons, Eudie and John, went on to win seven All-Ireland medals between them with Cork between 1920 and 1931. His daughter, Kitty, won three All-Ireland medals in-a-row between 1939 and 1941 as a member of the Cork camogie team. Coughlan's grandson, Willie, continued the hurling tradition by winning a championship medal with Blackrock in 1961.

Sporting positions
Preceded by Richard Mooney	Cork Senior Hurling Captain; 1897	Succeeded by Denis Cremin
