= William Clancy (disambiguation) =

William Clancy was an Irish missionary.

William Clancy may also refer to:

- Liam Clancy (1935–2009), William Clancy, Irish folk singer
- Bill Clancy (1879–1948), American baseball player

== See also ==
- Willie Clancy (disambiguation)
