= List of Cork inter-county footballers =

This is a very incomplete list of Gaelic footballers who have played at senior level for the Cork county team.

== List of players ==
Key
D	Dual player (hurling)

=== A ===
- Dinny Allen
- John Allen D

=== B ===
- Jimmy Barrett
- Declan Barron
- Jimmy Barry-Murphy D
- Derry Beckett D

=== C ===
- Eoin Cadogan D
- Niall Cahalane
- Graham Canty: Until 2013
- Philip Clifford
- John Coleman
- Colin Corkery
- Denis Coughlan D
- Tadhgo Crowley
- Danny Culloty
- Ray Cummins D

=== D ===
- Don Davis
- Tony Davis

=== F ===
- Shea Fahy

=== G ===
- Daniel Goulding: 2006–2016

=== H ===
- Con Hartnett
- John Hayes
- Donal Hunt

=== K ===
- Derek Kavanagh
- Kevin Kehily
- Humphrey Kelleher
- Paddy Kelly: 2008–2017
- Paul Kerrigan: 13 seasons, 2008–2020 made his senior debut against Kerry in the 2008 Munster SFC final
- Paudie Kissane: Retired aged 33 in 2013, made championship debut aged 28, though was a senior panelist in 2002 and 2003

=== L ===
- Dinny Long
- James Loughrey: 2013–2021, also played for Antrim
- Anthony Lynch: Until 2011
- Jack Lynch D

=== M ===
- Dave McCarthy
- Teddy McCarthy D
- Billy Mackesy D
- Kevin McMahon
- James Masters
- John Miskella: 1999–2011
- Billy Morgan
- Brian Murphy D
- Nicholas Murphy

=== O ===
- Alan O'Connor: Until 2013, returned 2015, retired 2017
- Donncha O'Connor: Until 2018
- Kieran O'Connor: 2004-2011
- Kevin O'Driscoll: Until 2021
- Kevin O'Dwyer
- Seán Óg Ó hAilpín D
- Noel O'Leary: 14 years, until 2013
- Colm O'Neill
- Pearse O'Neill
- Diarmuid O'Sullivan
- Kevin Jer O'Sullivan

=== P ===
- Jim Power

=== Q ===
- Alan Quirke: 1999–2013

=== S ===
- Ciarán Sheehan: Until 2021

=== T ===
- Larry Tompkins

=== W ===
- Aidan Walsh D
- Denis Walsh D

=== Y ===
- Éamonn Young

== See also ==
- List of Cork inter-county hurlers
