= Dan Dunne =

Irish hurler

Daniel Dunne
Personal information
- Native name: Dónall Ó Doinn (Irish)
- Born: 8 January 1908 Mullinavat, County Kilkenny, Ireland
- Died: 22 May 1984 (aged 76) Mullinavat, County Kilkenny, Ireland

Sport
- Sport: Hurling
- Position: Right corner-forward
Club
- Years: Club
- Young Irelands
Club titles
- Dublin titles: 2
Inter-county
- Years: County
- 1931-1933: Kilkenny
Inter-county titles
- Leinster titles: 6
- All-Irelands: 3
- NHL: 1

Daniel Dunne (8 January 1908 – 22 May 1984) was an Irish hurler. His inter-county career with the Kilkenny senior hurling team lasted from 1931 until 1933.

== Honours ==
Kilkenny

- All-Ireland Senior Hurling Championship (2): 1932, 1933
- Leinster Senior Hurling Championship (3): 1931, 1932, 1933
- National Hurling League (1): 1932-33
