= Johnny O'Callaghan =

Irish hurler

Personal information
- Native name: Seánie Ó Ceallaicháin (Irish)
- Born: 1964 (age 61–62) Ballyhea, County Cork, Ireland

Sport
- Sport: Hurling
- Position: Left wing-back
Club
- Years: Club
- Ballyhea
Club titles
- Cork titles: 0
Inter-county*
Years	County	Apps (scores)
1985-1986	Cork	1 (0-00)
Inter-county titles
- Munster titles: 0
- All-Irelands: 0
- NHL: 0
- All Stars: 0
- *Inter County team apps and scores correct as of 17:22, 23 May 2015.

John "Johnny" O'Callaghan (born 1964) is an Irish retired hurler who played as a left wing-back for the Cork senior team.

Born in Ballyhea, County Cork, O'Callaghan first arrived on the inter-county scene at the age of seventeen when he first linked up with the Cork minor team before later joining the under-21 side. He joined the senior panel during the 1985 championship. O'Callaghan was largely an unused substitute during his career, however, he did win one All-Ireland medal and two Munster medals as a non-playing substitute.

At club level O'Callaghan played with Ballyhea.

Throughout his career O'Callaghan made just one championship appearance. His retirement came following the conclusion of the 1986 championship.

== Honours ==
=== Team ===
Cork

- All-Ireland Senior Hurling Championship (1): 1986 (sub)
- Munster Senior Hurling Championship (2): 1985 (sub), 1986 (sub)
