= Michael O'Connell (botanist) =

Irish botanist

- Scientific career
- Fields: Botany
- Institutions: NUI Galway

Michael O'Connell is Professor of Botany at the National University of Ireland, Galway.

O'Connell is a member of the Palaeoenvironmental Research Unit and a member of the Environmental Protection Agency. His areas of interests include past environments, past climate change, long-term human impact and late-glacial and Holocene environments.

== Select bibliography ==
- Connemara:Vegetation and Land Use Since the Last Ice Age, Dublin, 1994.
- "Fresh insights into long-term changes in flora, vegetation, land use and soil erosion in the karstic environment of the Burren, western Ireland", with I. Feeser, in Journal of Ecology 97, pp. 1083–1100, 2009.
- "Palaeoecological investigations in the Barrees Valley", in Local worlds: Early settlement landscapes and upland farming in south-west Ireland, pp. 285–322, Cork, 2009.
