= Tom Coughlan (hurler) =

Irish hurler

Personal information
- Native name: Tomás Mac Cochláin (Irish)
- Nickname: Honest Man
- Born: 1881 Blackrock, County Cork, Ireland
- Died: Unknown
- Occupation: Fisherman
- Height: 5 ft 10 in (178 cm)

Sport
- Sport: Hurling
- Position: Centre-back
Club
- Years: Club
- Blackrock
Club titles
- Cork titles: 6
Inter-county
Years	County	Apps (scores)
1901-1911	Cork	24
Inter-county titles
- Munster titles: 4
- All-Irelands: 2

Tom "Honest Man" Coughlan (born 1881) was an Irish hurler who played as a centre-back for the Cork senior team.

Coughlan joined the team during the 1901 championship and was a regular member of the starting fifteen until his retirement after the 1911 championship. During that time he captained the team on numerous occasions and won two All-Ireland medals and four Munster medals.

At club level Coughlan was a multiple county club championship medalist with Blackrock.

Coughlan came from a family of other hurlers, and his brothers, Pat, Denis and Dan, all won All-Ireland medals with Cork. His nephews, Eudie and John, were also All-Ireland medalists in the 1920s and 1930s.

Sporting positions
Preceded by J. MCCullagh	Cork Senior Hurling Captain; 1908	Succeeded by Jamesy Kelleher
Preceded by Jamesy Kelleher	Cork Senior Hurling Captain; 1910	Succeeded by D. Bradley
