= Brian Sheehan =

Irish hurler

Personal information
- Native name: Briain Ó Síocháin (Irish)
- Born: 1972 (age 53–54) Blarney, County Cork, Ireland

Sport
- Sport: Hurling
- Position: Left corner-back
Club
- Years: Club
- Blarney
Club titles
- Cork titles: 0
Inter-county*
Years	County	Apps (scores)
1992-1994	Cork	0 (0-00)
Inter-county titles
- Munster titles: 0
- All-Irelands: 0
- NHL: 0
- All Stars: 0
- *Inter County team apps and scores correct as of 18:30, 5 August 2014.

Brian Sheehan (born 1972) is an Irish retired hurler who played as a left corner-back for the Cork senior team.

Born in Blarney, County Cork, Sheehan first arrived on the inter-county scene at the age of seventeen when he first linked up with the Cork minor teams as a dual player, before later joining the under-21, junior and intermediate sides. He joined the senior team during the 1992 championship. Sheehan went on to be a regular member of the team for a number of years, winning one Munster medal as an unused substitute.

At club level Sheehan is a one-time championship medallist in the junior grade with Blarney.

== Honours ==
=== Team ===
Blarney

- Cork Junior Hurling Championship (1): 1993

Cork

- Munster Senior Hurling Championship (1): 1992
- All-Ireland Junior Hurling Championship (1): 1994 (sub)
- Munster Junior Hurling Championship (3): 1992, 1994, 1996
- Munster Under-21 Hurling Championship (2): 1991, 1993
- Munster Minor Hurling Championship (1): 1988
