= Mick Ahern =

Irish hurler

Mick "Gah" Ahern
Personal information
- Native name: Mícheál Ó hEachtairn (Irish)
- Nickname: Gah
- Born: 22 May 1905 Blackrock, Cork, Ireland
- Died: 30 December 1946 (aged 41) Blackrock, Cork, Ireland

Sport
- Sport: Hurling
- Position: Full-forward
Club
- Years: Club
- Blackrock
Club titles
- Cork titles: 6
Inter-county
Years	County	Apps (scores)
1925–1932	Cork	30 (35–27)
Inter-county titles
- Munster titles: 4
- All-Irelands: 4
- NHL: 2

Michael John "Gah" Ahern (22 May 1905 – 30 December 1946) was an Irish hurler who played as a full-forward for the Cork senior team.

Born in Ballintemple, Cork, Ahern first played competitive hurling during his schooling at Crab Lane National School. He arrived on the inter-county scene at the age of twenty when he first linked up with the Cork junior team before later joining the senior side. He made his senior debut during the 1925 championship. Ahern immediately became a regular member of the starting fifteen, and won four All-Ireland medals, four Munster medals and two National Hurling League medals. He was an All-Ireland runner-up on one occasion.

At international level Ahern played for the victorious Tailteann Games hurling team in 1932. As a member of the Munster inter-provincial team on a number of occasions, he won two Railway Cup medals. At club level Ahern was a six-time championship medallist with Blackrock.

His brother, Paddy "Balty" Ahern, was a teammate with Cork and won five All-Ireland medals.

Ahern's career tally of 35 goals and 27 points was a record score for a Cork player which stood until 22 June 1952 when it was surpassed by Christy Ring.

Throughout his career Ahern made 30 championship appearances. He retired from inter-county hurling prior to the start of the 1932 championship.

== Playing career ==
=== Club ===
In 1924 Ahern was a key member of the Blackrock senior hurling team. He won his first championship medal that year following a 3–5 to 1–2 defeat of Redmonds.

Blackrock retained the title in 1925, with Ahern collecting a second championship medal following a 6–4 to 2–3 defeat of St. Finbarr's.

Three-in-a-row proved beyond Blackrock, however, in 1927 they were back in a fourth successive decider. A 5–5 to 2–1 defeat of Redmonds gave Ahern a third championship medal.

After a one-year hiatus "the Rockies" were back in the county decider once again in 1929. A 5–6 to 2–2 defeat of St. Finbarr's gave Ahern a fourth championship medal. It was the beginning of a great era of success for the club as further final victories over Glen Rovers in 1930 and Éire Óg in 1931 brother Ahern's championship medal tally to six.

=== Inter-county ===
==== Beginnings ====
Ahern first appeared for Cork as a member of the junior team in 1925. He won a Munster medal that year, after scoring a hat trick of goals in a 6–3 to 4–2 defeat of Clare in the decider. Ahern was at full-forward for the subsequent All-Ireland decider, which was delayed by almost a year. A 5–6 to 1–0 defeat of Dublin gave Ahern an All-Ireland Junior Hurling Championship medal.

On 2 August 1925 Ahern made his senior championship debut in a 5–3 to 5–1 Munster semi-final defeat by Tipperary.

==== Early successes ====
Ahern was a regular for Cork during the 1925–26 league, the inaugural running of the competition, and collected a first National Hurling League medal following a 3–7 to 1–5 defeat of Dublin in the decider. He later won his first Munster medal following a three-game saga with Tipperary, culminating in a 3–6 to 2–4 victory for Cork. On 24 October 1926 Ahern lined out in his first All-Ireland decider, as Cork faced Kilkenny for the first time since 1912. At a snow-covered Croke Park, the first half was even enough with Cork holding an interval lead of one point, however, Kilkenny slumped in the second half, going down to a 4–6 to 2–0 defeat. It was Ahern's first All-Ireland medal.

Ahern missed Cork's second successive Munster triumph in 1927, however, he was restored to the starting fifteen for Cork's subsequent All-Ireland meeting with Dublin on 4 September 1927. The Metropolitans were well on top in the opening thirty minutes and took a 2–3 to 0–1 lead at the interval. Cork fought back in the third quarter, however, an expert display of goalkeeping by Tommy Daly saved the day by keeping Ahern scoreless, as Dublin went on to win by 4–8 to 1–3.

==== Continued dominance ====
In 1928 Ahern won a second Munster medal following a 6–4 to 2–2 defeat of Clare in a replay. On 9 September 1928 Cork faced Galway in the All-Ireland decider. The Westerners, who got a bye into the final without lifting a hurley, were no match as a rout ensued. Ahern ran riot scoring 5–4, a record for an All-Ireland final, as Cork triumphed by 6–12 to 1–0. It was his second All-Ireland medal.

Ahern won a third Munster medal in 1929 as Cork made it four-in-a-row following a 4–6 to 2–3 defeat of Waterford. On 1 September 1929 Cork faced Galway in the All-Ireland final for the second successive year. Little had changed in a year as Cork were on the top of their game again. A rout ensued as "the Rebels" and Ahern claimed a third All-Ireland title from four final appearances with a 4–9 to 1–3 victory.

Cork exited the championship at the first hurdle in 1930, however, Ahern finished the year by winning a second league medal following a 3–5 to 3–0 defeat of Dublin the decider.

==== Fourth All-Ireland medal ====
Ahern was moved to centre-forward for the 1931 championship campaign. He won a fourth Munster medal that year following a 5–4 to 1–2 defeat of Waterford. 6 September 1931 saw Kilkenny face Cork in the All-Ireland final for the first time in five years. The first half was closely contested, with a goal from Ahern helping Cork to a half-time lead of 1–3 to 0–2. Cork stretched the advantage to six points in the second half, but Kilkenny came storming back with a goal and then four points on the trot to take the lead by one point. In the dying moments Cork captain Eudie Coughlan got possession and made his way towards the goal. As he did so he slipped and fell but struck the sliotar while he was down on his knees, and it went over the bar for the equalising point. A 1–6 apiece draw was the result. 11 October 1931 was the date of the replay and proved to be just as exciting a contest as the first game. Kilkenny's Lory Meagher was playing the best hurling of his career at this time and scored a magnificent point from 90 yards out the field. In spite of this great effort a winner couldn't be found and both sides finished level again at 2–5 apiece. After this game officials pressed for extra time, however, Eudie Coughlan rejected this. It was also suggested at a meeting of Central Council that both teams be declared joint champions and that half an All-Ireland medal by given to each player. This motion was later defeated. As the All-Ireland saga went to a third meeting on 1 November 1931, Kilkenny's captain Meagher was ruled out of the game because of broken ribs sustained in the first replay. Such was the esteem in which he was held the game was virtually conceded to Cork since the star player couldn't play. In spite of fielding a younger team, Kilkenny were defeated by Cork on a score line of 5–8 to 3–4. It was Ahern's fourth and final All-Ireland medal.

Ahern brought the curtain down on his inter-county career following Cork's exit from the 1932 championship. At the time he was Cork's all-time top championship scorer.

=== Inter-provincial ===
In 1926 Ahern was chosen on the inaugural Munster inter-provincial team which narrowly fell to Leinster in the decider.

After a one-year absence Ahern was back on the team again in 1928. A 5–3 to 3–1 defeat of arch rivals Leinster gave him his first Railway Cup medal.

Ahern missed out on the 1930 triumph, however, he was back on the team again in 1931. A 1–12 to 2–6 defeat of Leinster once again gave him a second Railway Cup medal.

=== International ===
In 1932 Ahern's prowess as one of the top forwards of his era was recognised when he was chosen for the Ireland national hurling team for the Tailteann Games . A defeat of Scotland, whose players relied on their shinty, gave him a winners' medal.

== Personal life ==
Born in Ballintemple, Cork, Ahern was the eighth and youngest child born to Patrick and Norah Ahern. He was educated at Crab Lane National School where his hurling skills were first developed and he quickly earned a reputation as the boy wonder of the school shield competitions.

On 30 December 1946, Ahern died from tuberculosis aged 41.

== Honours ==
=== Team ===
Blackrock

- Cork Senior Hurling Championship (6): 1924, 1925, 1927, 1929, 1930, 1931

Cork

- All-Ireland Senior Hurling Championship (4): 1926, 1928, 1929, 1931
- Munster Senior Hurling Championship (4): 1926, 1928, 1929, 1931
- National Hurling League (2): 1925–26, 1929–30
- All-Ireland Junior Hurling Championship (1): 1925
- Munster Junior Hurling Championship (1): 1925

Munster

- Railway Cup (2): 1929, 1931

Ireland

- Tailteann Games (1): 1932
