= 1925–26 National Hurling League =

First season of the National Hurling League

League details
- Dates: 27 September 1925 – 16 May 1926
- Teams: 7

League champions
- Winners: Cork (1st win)
- Captain: Seán Óg Murphy

League runners-up
- Runners-up: Dublin
- Captain: Ned Tobin

Other division winners
- Division 2A: Clare

The 1925–26 National Hurling League was the first edition of the National Hurling League, which ran from 27 September 1925 until 16 May 1926.

The seven participating teams in Division 1 were Cork, Dublin, Galway, Kilkenny, Laois, Limerick and Tipperary who agreed to play a six game format whereby each team would play each of their six rivals once with two points awarded for a win and one point awarded for a drawn game. The two teams with most points at the completion of the season would play a final, with the winners being declared National Hurling League champions.

Cork defeated Dublin by 3-7 to 1-5 in the final.

Cork also won the All-Ireland Championship in 1926, the first time that a team completed the league-championship double.

Division 2 was contested by five teams: Clare, Kerry, Offaly, Waterford and Wexford.

== National Hurling League ==
=== Division 1 ===
==== Table ====
Pos	Team	Pld	W	D	L	Pts	Notes
1	Cork	6	5	0	1	10	National Hurling League champions
2	Dublin	5	4	0	1	8	National Hurling League runners-up
3	Laois	6	3	0	3	6	
4	Galway	6	3	0	3	6	
5	Tipperary	6	3	0	3	6	
6	Limerick	5	1	0	4	2	
7	Kilkenny	6	1	0	5	2	

- Points cancelled in Dublin–Limerick tie. Dublin won match

==== Final ====
16 May 1926 Final	Cork	3-7 - 1-5	Dublin	Cork Athletic Grounds
		Report		Attendance: 14,000; Referee: S Hogan (Waterford)

=== Division 2 ===
==== Table ====
Pos	Team	Pld	W	D	L	Pts	Notes
1	Clare	4	4	0	0	8	Division 2 champions
2	Offaly	4	3	0	1	6	Division 2 runners-up
3	Kerry	4	2	0	2	4	
4	Waterford	4	0	0	4	0	
5	Wexford	4	0	0	4	0	
