= 1929–30 National Hurling League =

Fourth season of the National Hurling League

League champions
- Winners: Cork (2nd win)
- Captain: Eudie Coughlan

League runners-up
- Runners-up: Dublin
- Captain: Mick Gill

The 1929–30 National Hurling League was the fourth edition of the National Hurling League.

Each team played each of their rivals once with two points awarded for a win and one point awarded for a drawn game. The teams who finished top would advance to the knock-out stage, with the winners being declared National Hurling League champions.

Cork defeated Dublin by 3-5 to 3-0 in the final.

== Results ==
=== Knock-out stage ===
23 November 1930 Semi-final	Dublin	8-6 - 1-0	Clare	Croke Park

30 November 1930 Final	Cork	3-5 - 3-0	Dublin	Cork Athletic Grounds
				Attendance: 10,000
