= 1931 All-Ireland Senior Hurling Championship =

Championship details
- Dates: 10 May – 1 November 1931
- Teams: 12

All-Ireland champions
- Winning team: Cork (11th win)
- Captain: Eudie Coughlan

All-Ireland Finalists
- Losing team: Kilkenny
- Captain: Lory Meagher

Provincial champions
- Munster: Cork
- Leinster: Kilkenny
- Ulster: Not Played
- Connacht: Not Played

Championship statistics
- No. matches played: 15
- Goals total: 79 (5.64 per game)
- Points total: 117 (8.35 per game)
- Top Scorer: Dan Dunne (8–3)
- All-Star Team: See here

The 1931 All-Ireland Senior Hurling Championship was the 45th staging of the All-Ireland Senior Hurling Championship, the Gaelic Athletic Association's premier inter-county hurling tournament. The championship ran from 10 May to 1 November 1931.

Tipperary were the defending champions, however, they were beaten by Cork in the Munster semi-final.

The All-Ireland final went to two replays for the only time in the history of the competition. The second replay was played at Croke Park in Dublin on 1 November 1931 between Cork and Kilkenny, in what was their sixth championship meeting overall and a first meeting in the All-Ireland final in five years. Cork won the match by 5–08 to 3–04 to claim their 11th All-Ireland title overall and a first title in two years.

Kilkenny's Dan Dunne was the championship's top scorer with 8–03.

== Leinster Senior Hurling Championship ==
=== Leinster quarter-finals ===
17 May 1931 Quarter-final	Offaly	3–02 – 3–05	Meath	Balyduff Park

31 May 1931 Quarter-final	Wexford	1–01 – 8–08	Kilkenny	New Ross Garounds

=== Leinster semi-finals ===
21 June 1931 Semi-final	Laois	2–02 – 1–03	Dublin	Nowlan Park

5 July 1931 Semi-final	Kilkenny	5–09 – 1–02	Meath	Nowlan Park
				Attendance: 10,000

=== Leinster final ===
2 August 1931 Final	Kilkenny	4–7 – 4–2	Laois	Nowlan Park
	M Larkin 2–2, D Morrissey 1–0, Matty Power 1–0, P Phelan 0–2, E Byrne 0–1, P Walsh 0–1, L Meagher 0–1.		J Fitzpatrick 2–0, P Drennan 1–2, P Carroll 1–0.	Attendance: 10,000

== Munster Senior Hurling Championship ==
=== Munster quarter-finals ===
10 May 1931 Quarter-final	Tipperary	3–04 – 0–02	Limerick	Cork Athletic Grounds

28 June 1931 Quarter-final	Cork	3–04 – 1–06	Clare	Thurles Sportsfield

=== Munster semi-finals ===
17 May 1931 Semi-final	Waterford	8–04 – 3–01	Kerry	Tralee Sportsfield

26 July 1931 Semi-final	Tipperary	2–03 – 3–05	Cork	Thurles Sportsfield

=== Munster final ===
16 August 1931 Final	Waterford	4–00 – 1–09	Cork	Clonmel Grounds

=== Munster final replay ===
30 August 1931 Final replay	Cork	5–04 – 2–01	Waterford	Clonmel Grounds

== All-Ireland Senior Hurling Championship ==
=== All-Ireland semi-final ===
16 August 1931 Semi-final	Kilkenny	7–02 – 3-01	Galway	Croke Park

=== All-Ireland final ===
6 September 1931 Final	Cork	1–06 – 1-06	Kilkenny	Croke Park
				Attendance: 26,460; Referee: S Robbins (Offaly)

=== All-Ireland final replay ===
11 October 1931 Final replay	Cork	2–05 – 2-05	Kilkenny	Croke Park
				Attendance: 33,124; Referee: S Robbins (Offaly)

=== All-Ireland final second replay ===
1 November 1931 Final second replay	Cork	5–08 – 3-04	Kilkenny	Croke Park
				Attendance: 31,935; Referee: W Walsh (Waterford)

== Championship statistics ==
=== Scoring ===
- Widest winning margin: 28 points
  - Kilkenny 8–8 : Wexford 1–1 (Leinster quarter-final, 31 May 1931)
- Most goals in a match: 10
  - Kilkenny 7–2 : Galway 3–1 (All-Ireland semi-final, 16 August 1931)
- Most points in a match: 12
  - Kilkenny 1–6 : Cork 1–6 (All-Ireland final, 6 September 1931)
  - Kilkenny 3–4 : Cork 5–8 (All-Ireland final second replay, 1 November 1931)
- Most goals by one team in a match: 8
  - Kilkenny 8–8 : Wexford 1–1 (Leinster quarter-final, 31 May 1931)
- Most goals scored by a losing team: 4
  - Laois 4–2 : Kilkenny 4–7 (Leinster final, 2 August 1931)
- Most points scored by a losing team: 6
  - Clare 1–6 : Cork 3–4 (Munster quarter-final, 28 June 1931)

== Sources ==
- Corry, Eoghan, The GAA Book of Lists (Hodder Headline Ireland, 2005).
- Donegan, Des, The Complete Handbook of Gaelic Games (DBA Publications Limited, 2005).
