= 1926 All-Ireland Senior Hurling Championship =

Championship details
- Dates: 18 April – 24 October 1926
- Teams: 11

All-Ireland champions
- Winning team: Cork (8th win)
- Captain: Seán Óg Murphy

All-Ireland Finalists
- Losing team: Kilkenny
- Captain: Dick Grace

Provincial champions
- Munster: Cork
- Leinster: Kilkenny
- Ulster: Not Played
- Connacht: Not Played

Championship statistics
- No. matches played: 12
- All-Star Team: See here

The 1926 All-Ireland Senior Hurling Championship was the 40th staging of the All-Ireland Senior Hurling Championship, the Gaelic Athletic Association's premier inter-county hurling tournament. The championship began on 18 April 1926 and ended on 24 October 1926.

The championship was won by Cork who secured the title following a 4–6 to 2–0 defeat of Kilkenny in the All-Ireland final. This was their 8th All-Ireland title.

Tipperary were the defending champions but were defeated by Cork in the Munster final.

Antrim won the Ulster SHC title, but at the suggestion of the Central Council, it was decided that the Ulster winners would enter the All Ireland Junior Hurling Championship.

== Results ==
=== Leinster Senior Hurling Championship ===
2 May 1926 Semi-final	Laois	2–3 – 3–3	Offaly	Portlaoise Sportsfield

Semi-final	Kilkenny	4–8 – 5–4	Dublin

11 July 1926 Final	Kilkenny	3–8 – 1–4	Offaly	Croke Park

=== Munster Senior Hurling Championship ===
18 April 1926 Quarter-final	Kerry	4–6 – 2–4	Clare	Tralee Sportsfield

30 May 1926 Quarter-final	Waterford	5–2 – 12–3	Cork	Fraher Field

15 August 1926 Semi-final	Cork	7–7 – 1–4	Kerry	Cork Athletic Grounds

22 August 1926 Semi-final	Tipperary	6–5 – 4–6	Limerick	Fraher Field

12 September 1926 Final	Cork	0–0 – 1–2	Tipperary	Cork Athletic Grounds

19 September 1926 Final replay	Tipperary	4–1 – 3–4	Cork	Thurles Sportsfield

3 October 1926 Final second replay	Tipperary	2–4 – 3–6	Cork	Thurles Sportsfield

=== All-Ireland Senior Hurling Championship ===
29 August 1926 Semi-final	Kilkenny	6–2 – 5–1	Galway	Croke Park

24 October 1926 Final	Cork	4–6 – 2–0	Kilkenny	Croke Park
				Attendance: 26,829; Referee: P McCullagh (Wexford)

== Championship statistics ==
=== Miscellaneous ===
- The Munster final between Cork and Tipperary is abandoned after just ten minutes when the crowd storm the field.
- For the first time ever the Munster final goes to a second replay.
- The All-Ireland semi-final between Kilkenny and Galway is the first GAA game to be broadcast on radio. The commentator is P.D. Mehigan. It is also the first commentary on a field game to take place in Europe.

== Sources ==
- Corry, Eoghan, The GAA Book of Lists (Hodder Headline Ireland, 2005).
- Donegan, Des, The Complete Handbook of Gaelic Games (DBA Publications Limited, 2005).
