= 1929 All-Ireland Senior Hurling Championship =

Championship details
- Dates: 19 May – 1 September 1929
- Teams: 12

All-Ireland champions
- Winning team: Cork (10th win)
- Captain: Dinny Barry-Murphy

All-Ireland Finalists
- Losing team: Galway
- Captain: Junior Mahony

Provincial champions
- Munster: Cork
- Leinster: Kilkenny
- Ulster: Not Played
- Connacht: Not Played

Championship statistics
- No. matches played: 11
- Goals total: 80 (7.27 per game)
- Points total: 91 (8.27 per game)
- All-Star Team: See here

The All-Ireland Senior Hurling Championship 1929 was the 43rd series of the All-Ireland Senior Hurling Championship, Ireland's premier hurling knock-out competition. Cork won the championship, beating Galway 4–9 to 1–3 in the final.

== Format ==
Leinster Championship

Quarter-finals: (2 matches) These were two single matches between the first four teams drawn from the province of Leinster. Two teams were eliminated at this stage while the two winning teams advanced to the semi-finals.

Semi-finals: (2 matches) The winners of the two quarter-finals joined the two remaining Leinster teams to make up the semi-final pairings. Two teams were eliminated at this stage while the two winning teams advanced to the final.

Final: (1 match) The winners of the two semi-finals contested this game. One team was eliminated at this stage while the winning team advanced to the All-Ireland semi-final.

Munster Championship

Quarter-final: (1 match) This was a lone match between the first two teams drawn from the province of Munster. One team was eliminated at this stage while the winning team advanced to the semi-finals.

Semi-finals: (2 matches) The winner of the lone quarter-final joined the three remaining Munster teams to make up the semi-final pairings. Two teams were eliminated at this stage while the two winning teams advanced to the final.

Final: (1 match) The winners of the two semi-finals contested this game. One team was eliminated at this stage while the winning team advanced to the All-Ireland final.

All-Ireland Championship

Semi-final: (1 match) The winners of the Leinster championship were drawn to play Galway, who received a bye to this stage of the championship. One team was eliminated at this stage while the winning team advanced to the final.

Final: (1 match) The winners of the lone semi-final and the Munster champions contested this game with the winners being declared All-Ireland champions.

== Results ==
=== Leinster Senior Hurling Championship ===
May 19, 1929
Quarter-final

Laois	5–4 – 1–5	Offaly

O'Moore Park, Portlaoise

May 26, 1929
Quarter-final

Meath	4–5 – 2–2	Wexford

Croke Park, Dublin

July 7, 1929
Semi-final

Meath	3–2 – 6–0	Kilkenny

The Show Grounds, Navan

July 14, 1929
Semi-final

Dublin	8–10 – 1–2	Laois

O'Connor Park, Tullamore

July 29, 1929
Final

Kilkenny	3–5 – 2–6	Dublin

Kennedy Park, New Ross

The Leinster Council declare the Leinster final void after the game started twenty minutes late due to the late arrival of some Kilkenny players. The referee declared Kilkenny the 3–5 to 2–6 winners over Dublin, however, this result was not allowed to stand. The possibility of a replay was ruled out by the Leinster Council as it would establish a dangerous precedent. A proposal that Dublin represent Leinster in the All-Ireland series was defeated by a single vote in favour of Kilkenny.

=== Munster Senior Hurling Championship ===
June 16, 1929
Quarter-final

Tipperary	6–5 – 3–3	Clare

Thurles Sportsfield, Thurles

June 30, 1929
Semi-final

Waterford	4–4 – 2–4	Limerick

Gaelic Grounds, Limerick

July 21, 1929
Semi-final

Cork	3–4 – 2–1	Tipperary

Cork Athletic Grounds, Cork

August 11, 1929
Final

Cork	4–6 – 2–3	Waterford

Fraher Field, Dungarvan

=== All-Ireland Senior Hurling Championship ===
August 11, 1929
Semi-final

Kilkenny	7–1 – 7–7	Galway

St. Brendan's Park, Birr

September 1, 1929
Final

Cork	4–9 – 1–3	Galway

Croke Park, Dublin
Attendance: c.14,000
Referee: S. Robbins (Offaly)

== Sources ==
- Corry, Eoghan, The GAA Book of Lists (Hodder Headline Ireland, 2005).
- Donegan, Des, The Complete Handbook of Gaelic Games (DBA Publications Limited, 2005).
