= 1928 All-Ireland Senior Hurling Championship =

All-Ireland champions
- Winning team: Cork (9th win)
- Captain: Seán Óg Murphy

All-Ireland Finalists
- Losing team: Galway
- Captain: Jim Power

Provincial champions
- Munster: Cork
- Leinster: Dublin
- Ulster: Not Played
- Connacht: Not Played

Championship statistics
- All-Star Team: See here

The All-Ireland Senior Hurling Championship 1928 was the 42nd series of the All-Ireland Senior Hurling Championship, Ireland's premier hurling knock-out competition. Cork won the championship, beating Galway 6–12 to 1–0 in the final.

== Format ==
All-Ireland Championship

Semi-final: (1 match) The Leinster and Munster champions were drawn to play each other in a lone semi-final. One team was eliminated at this stage while the winners advanced to the All-Ireland final.

Final: (1 match) Galway received a bye to this stage of the championship and played the winners of the lone semi-final. The winners were declared All-Ireland champions.

== Results ==
=== Leinster Senior Hurling Championship ===
May 6
Quarter-final

| Laois | 6–1 – 1–4 | Wexford |

Nowlan Park, Kilkenny

May 13
Quarter-final

| Dublin | 3–5 – 0–6 | Kilkenny |

O'Moore Park, Portlaoise

May 27
Semi-final

| Offaly | 7–0 – 4–2 | Meath |

Nowlan Park, Kilkenny

June 17
Semi-final

| Dublin | 7–0 – 1–2 | Laois |

Ballyduff Park, Tullamore

July 15
Final

| Dublin | 9–7 – 4–3 | Offaly |
|---|---|---|
| T Barry 3–1, Matty Power 2–1, C Griffin 2–0, J Leeson 1–0, M Gill 1–0, G Howard 0–3, T Quinlan 0–1. | | T Hannon 2–0, T Lawless 1–0, K Grogan 1–0, R O'Brien 0–3. |

Croke Park, Dublin

=== Munster Senior Hurling Championship ===
May 13
Semi-final

| Waterford | 0–3 – 4–8 | Cork |

Gaelic Park, Waterford

June 3
Quarter-final

| Tipperary | 4–2 – 2–6 | Limerick |

Cork Athletic Grounds, Cork

June 24
Semi-final

| Tipperary | 2–5 – 5–5 | Clare |

Thurles Sportsfield, Thurles

July 15
Final

| Cork | 2–2 – 2–2 | Clare |

Thurles Sportsfield, Thurles

July 29
Final replay

| Cork | 6–4 – 2–2 | Clare |

Thurles Sportsfield, Thurles

=== Ulster Senior Hurling Championship ===
21 October
Final

| Antrim | 4–5 – 1–1 | Down |

Castlewellan

=== All-Ireland Senior Hurling Championship ===
August 26
Semi-final

| Cork | 5–3 – 0–2 | Dublin |

Nowlan Park, Kilkenny

September 9
Final

| Cork | 6–12 – 1–0 | Galway |

Croke Park, Dublin
Attendance: 15,259
Referee: J. Roberts (Kilkenny)

== Sources ==
- Corry, Eoghan, The GAA Book of Lists (Hodder Headline Ireland, 2005).
- Donegan, Des, The Complete Handbook of Gaelic Games (DBA Publications Limited, 2005).
