= Eudie Coughlan =

Irish hurler

- Eudie Coughlan (right) prior to the start of the 1931 All-Ireland final.

Personal information
- Native name: Eoghan Ó Cochláin (Irish)
- Nickname: Eudie
- Born: 26 August 1900 Blackpool, Cork, Ireland
- Died: 4 January 1987 (aged 86) Blackrock, Cork, Ireland

Sport
- Sport: Hurling
- Position: Half-forward
Club
- Years: Club
- Blackrock
Club titles
- Cork titles: 7
Inter-county
Years	County	Apps (scores)
1919–1931	Cork	34 (11–33)
Inter-county titles
- Munster titles: 7
- All-Irelands: 5
- NHL: 2
- All Stars: 1

Eugene "Eudie" Coughlan (26 August 1900 – 4 January 1987) was an Irish hurler. His league and championship career with the Cork senior team spanned thirteen seasons from 1919 until 1931.

Born in Cork, Coughlan was raised in a strong hurling family. His father as well as several of his paternal and maternal uncles all won All-Ireland medals with Cork in the early years of the championship.

Coughlan first played competitive hurling with the Blackrock club, making his senior debut in 1918. In a hugely successful club career, he lined out in twelve county finals, winning seven county senior championship medals.

After impressing on the club scene, Coughlan came to prominence at inter-county level at the age of nineteen when he was added to the Cork senior panel in 1919. Over the course of the next thirteen seasons he won five All-Ireland medals, beginning with a lone triumph as a non-playing substitute in his debut season, three championship titles in four seasons between 1926 and 1929 and a fifth and final winners' medal as captain of the team in 1931. Coughlan also won seven Munster medals and two National Hurling League medals. He played his last game for Cork in November 1931. Coughlan was joined on the Cork team by his brother, John.

After being chosen on the Munster inter-provincial team for the first time in 1928, Coughlan was an automatic choice on the starting fifteen for a number of years until 1932. During that time he won three Railway Cup medals.

Even during his playing days Coughlan came to be recognised as one of the greatest players of all time. In 1985 he was the recipient of the GAA's All-Time All-Star Award, while he was posthumously named in the right wing-forward position on the Cork Hurling Team of the Century in 2000.

== Early life ==
Eugene 'Eudie' Coughlan (pronounced Cawlan) was born in Blackrock, just outside Cork in 1899. He was born into a family that was steeped in the hurling tradition of the area. Coughlan's father, Pat, was the eldest of the family and won back-to-back All-Ireland titles in 1893 and 1894. His uncles included Denis 'Lyonsie' Coughlan, Jer Coughlan, Dan Coughlan and Tom 'Honest Man' Coughlan who all played with 'the Rockies' and claimed All-Ireland titles with Cork. Coughlan's mother's maiden name was Dorney. Her brothers were also both prominent in Blackrock and Cork hurling circles.

All of Coughlan's family earned their livelihoods as fishermen. As a youngster he rowed a boat on the River Lee, picked mussels and prepared them for dispatch to Liverpool. Coughlan later worked with the Ford Motor Company, the workplace of many Cork All-Ireland medal winners, before finding a job with the Cork Harbour Board.

== Playing career ==
=== Club ===
Coughlan carried on the tradition of his father and uncles and played his club hurling with the famous Blackrock club. He enjoyed much success. Coughlan lined out in his first county final in 1918, however, 'the Rockies' were defeated by Carrigtwohill. It was the first of nine consecutive final appearances for the Blackrock club. The following year Coughlan's club made the final once again, however, on that occasion it was the St. Finbarr's club who triumphed. In 1920 Coughlan won his first senior county title as Fairhill were defeated in the final. The championship was suspended in 1921, however, Coughlan's side were back in the finals of 1922 and 1923. On both occasions the team was beaten by 'the Barr's.' Coughlan added two more county victories to his collection in 1924 and 1925, however, St. Finbarr's caught Blackrock in the final of 1926. The following year Coughlan won his fourth county medal. Blackrock failed to reach the final in 1928, however, in 1929 he won his fifth county title. It was the first of three-in-a-row for Coughlan, bringing his county medal tally to seven. The 1931 final victory was Coughlan's last big occasion with Blackrock. The club would not win another county title until 1956.

=== Inter-county ===
Coughlan first came to the attention of the Cork hurling selectors in 1919 when Blackrock played a Cork selection in a game in aid of Republican prisoners. Later that same year he was a non-playing substitute on the Cork team that defeated Dublin to win the All-Ireland final. The following year Coughlan was still a member of the substitute's bench when Cork won the Munster title. He did line out in the subsequent All-Ireland final with Dublin providing the opposition once again. In a close game 'the Dubs' avenged the defeat of 1919 by winning on a score line of 4–9 to 4–3.

Cork were defeated in the provincial championship for the next few seasons as Limerick and Tipperary came to dominate the competition. In the winter and spring of 1925–1926 the inaugural National Hurling League was played. Coughlan's side reached the final of that competition and defeated Dublin, giving Coughlan, and his brother John, his first major victory. Cork later proved themselves by reaching the Munster final. Tipperary were the opponents on that occasion and took a 1–2 to 0–0 lead. At that point the game was abandoned and a replay was ordered. The second game was a much tighter affair with both sides finishing level on a score line of 4–1 to 3–4. The third game was also a close affair, however, Cork pulled through to win by 3–6 to 2–4, giving Coughlan his first Munster title on the field of play. The subsequent All-Ireland final pitted Cork against Kilkenny at a snow-covered Croke Park in October of that year. Coughlan's side took the lead at half-time and held on to win by 4–6 to 2–0. It was Cork's first championship title since 1919 and Coughlan's first All-Ireland medal on the field of play.

Cork retained their Munster title in 1927 with a 5–3 to 3–4 victory over Clare. The subsequent All-Ireland final saw Cork take on Dublin once again. Cork fell behind by 2–3 to 0–1 at half-time; however, they fought back in the second-half. In a team made up of nine members of the Garda Síochána 'the Dubs' claimed the victory by 4–8 to 1–3.

In 1928 Cork faced Clare in the Munster final for the second year in-a-row. That game ended in a draw, however, in the replay Cork triumphed with Coughlan collecting his third consecutive Munster title. Cork later defeated Dublin in the All-Ireland semi-final before lining out against Galway in the championship decider. Galway got a bye into the final without picking up a hurley, however, the game turned into a rout. A score line of 6–12 to 1–0 gave Cork the victory and gave Coughlan a second All-Ireland medal. 1928 also saw Coughlan lining out with the Irish Hurling Team in the Tailteann Games, Ireland's answer to the Olympic Games.

In 1929 Cork retained their provincial dominance for a fourth consecutive year. A 4–6 to 2–3 defeat of Waterford gave Coughlan his fourth Munster title in four years. The subsequent All-Ireland final was a replay of the previous year's game as Cork played Galway once again. Mick Ahern scored a goal for Cork after just 25 seconds to start another rout. Cork won the day by 4–9 to 1–3 giving Coughlan his third All-Ireland title.

In 1930 Coughlan was appointed captain of the Cork senior hurling team. That year he won a second National League title, however, Cork surrendered their provincial crown later that summer. The team bounced back in 1931 with Coughlan, who was still the captain of the side, collecting a fifth Munster winners' medal. Once again it took a replay for Cork and Waterford to be separated. The All-Ireland final saw Cork take on Kilkenny for the first time since 1926. After a close game both sides finished level – 1–6 apiece. Coughlan played a captain's role in that game as he scored a point from his knees to level the scores. The replay of the final took place four weeks later and is regarded as a classic. Cork took the lead at half-time, however, Kilkenny fought back. Once again both sides finished level – 2–5 apiece. After this game officials pressed for extra time, however, Coughlan, as Cork captain, rejected this. It was also suggested at a meeting of the GAA's Central Council that both counties be declared joint champions and that half an All-Ireland medal by given to each player. This motion was later defeated. The first week of November saw the second replay of the All-Ireland final take place. Coughlan gave his best-ever performance in that game. At the third attempt Cork triumphed by 5–8 to 3–4 giving Coughlan his fourth All-Ireland medal.

At the beginning of 1932 Coughlan took umbrage at the actions of the Cork County Board in taking from his club, Blackrock, the selection of the Cork senior hurling team for the upcoming year. Coughlan, although in line to retain the captaincy, retired from inter-county hurling in protest at the relatively young age of 31.

=== Provincial ===
Coughlan also lined out with Munster in the inter-provincial hurling competition. He first played for his province in the second year of the Railway Cup competition in 1928. On that occasion he collected his first winners' medal as Munster defeated Leinster. Coughlan remained on the team and helped Munster to capture further titles in 1929 and 1931. He was appointed captain in 1932, however, Munster were defeated by Leinster.

== Post-playing career ==
In retirement from the game Coughlan came to be recognised as one of the greatest players of all-time. In 1961 he was selected, by popular opinion, as a wing-forward on a Gael-Linn sponsored "Best Ever Team". At the 1984 All-Ireland Hurling Final he received a great welcome when he was presented to the crowd during the celebrations to mark the centenary of the Gaelic Athletic Association. At the time Coughlan, who was in his 85th year, was the oldest-living captain of an All-Ireland-winning senior hurling team. Just before the game he was presented to the crowd along with such hurling greats as Jack Lynch, Eddie Keher and Jimmy Doyle. The following year Coughlan was presented with the GAA All-Time All-Star Award.

Eudie Coughlan died on 4 January 1987. He was posthumously honoured in 2000 when he was named in the right wing-forward position on the Cork Hurling Team of the Century.

== Honours ==
=== Blackrock ===
- Cork Senior Hurling Championship:
  - Winner (7): 1920, 1924, 1925, 1927, 1929, 1930, 1931
  - Runner-up (5): 1918, 1919, 1922, 1923, 1926

=== Cork ===
- All-Ireland Senior Hurling Championship:
  - Winner (4): 1926, 1928, 1929, 1931
  - Runner-up (2): 1920, 1927
- Munster Senior Hurling Championship:
  - Winner (5): 1926, 1927, 1928, 1929, 1931
  - Runner-up (1): 1921,
- National Hurling League:
  - Winner (2): 1925–1926, 1929–1930
  - Runner-up (1): 1928–1929

=== Munster ===
- Railway Cup:
  - Winner (3): 1928, 1929, 1931
  - Runner-up (1): 1932

== Sources ==
- Corry, Eoghan, The GAA Book of Lists (Hodder Headline Ireland, 2005).
- Fullam, Brendan, Captains of the Ash (Wolfhound Press, 2002).

Sporting positions
Preceded by Dinny Barry-Murphy	Cork Senior Hurling Captain; 1930–1931	Succeeded by Edward O'Connell
Achievements
Preceded by John Joe Callinan (Tipperary)	All-Ireland Senior Hurling winning captain 1931	Succeeded by Jimmy Walsh (Kilkenny)
Awards
Preceded by Jim Langton (Kilkenny)	GAA All-Time All-Star Award; 1985	Succeeded by Tommy Doyle (Tipperary
