= Structure of the Gaelic Athletic Association =

The structure of the Gaelic Athletic Association (GAA) is a voluntary, democratic association consisting of various boards, councils, and committees organised in a structured hierarchy. The individual club is the basic unit of the association, and the world headquarters are at Croke Park. All of the GAA's activities are governed by a book called the Official Guide.

== County boards ==
Each county board may have its own by-laws, none of which may conflict with the Official Guide. Each divisional board may have its own regulations, none of which may duplicate or contradict the Official Guide or county by-laws.

- Annual Congress
- President
- Central Council
- Provincial councils
- County Board
  - Divisional Board (in some larger counties)
  - Sport specific board (in some counties)
- Club Committee

Congress is an annual GAA county boards and provincial councils meeting. It is here that changes to the Official Guide can be made. Central Council is a committee consisting of representatives of county boards and senior management at Croke Park. In Ireland, there are four provincial councils, and some overseas units fit into the same level, such as the British Provincial Council. In Ireland there are 32 county boards, and again there are overseas units that fit into this level, such as the New York Board and the Canadian Board.

Except for Central Council, all of these councils, boards, and committees are elected at an annual meeting at which the outgoing board reports on its year's activities before stepping down and the election of the incoming board taking place.

== Higher Education GAA ==
The Higher Education GAA fulfills a similar role as the county board in competitions in which educational institutions such as University College Dublin (UCD) field teams. Some institutions (such as UCD) are also considered clubs by the county board and so fall under the two jurisdictions.

- Annual Congress
- President
- Central Council
- Higher Education GAA
- Educational institution
