= John Maher (Tipperary hurler) =

Irish hurler

Personal information
- Native name: Seán Ó Meachair (Irish)
- Born: 26 June 1908 Thurles, County Tipperary, Ireland
- Died: 11 July 1990 (aged 81) Beaumont, Dublin, Ireland
- Occupation: Farmer
- Height: 6 ft 2 in (188 cm)

Sport
- Sport: Hurling
- Position: Centre Back
Club
- Years: Club
- 1929-1946: Thurles Sarsfields
Club titles
- Tipperary titles: 9
Inter-county
- Years: County
- 1929-1945: Tipperary
Inter-county titles
- Munster titles: 4
- All-Irelands: 3
- NHL: 0

John Maher (26 June 1908 – 11 July 1990) was an Irish hurler. At club level he played for Thurles Sarsfields, captaining the club on a number of occasions, and was the captain of the Tipperary senior hurling team that won the 1945 All-Ireland Championship.

Widely regarded as one of the Thurles Sarsfields club's all-time greats, Maher's career spanned three decades. During that time he won nine Tipperary Senior Championship medals, including two as club captain in 1944 and 1945.

Maher made his first appearance for the Tipperary senior hurling team as the youngest member of their 1930 All-Ireland Championship-winning team. Over the following fifteen years he was a regular member of the half-back line, and won further All-Ireland Championship medals in 1937 and as captain of the team in 1945. Maher also won four Munster Championship medals.

Maher's father, Dinny, was the first ever captain of the Tipperary senior hurling team, while his direct descendants, Pa Bourke and Pádraic Maher, have also won All-Ireland Championship medals.

== Biography ==
John Maher was born in Thurles, County Tipperary in 1908. He was born into a family that had a strong association with the hurling tradition of the area. His father, "Long" Dinny Maher, had been involved with the Thurles Blues side that won the first ever All-Ireland hurling title in 1887. He captained the team in some of the games, however, he played no part in the final due to a dispute over travel expenses. In later years, other members of the Maher clan were instrumental in the purchase of Thurles Sportsfield, later Semple Stadium.

Maher grew up on the family farm just outside the town and was educated locally. After a brief education he took over the family farm, got married and worked on the land for the rest of his life. In his playing days he was known as a fierce opponent who manned the Tipperary half back line like his life depended on it. Indeed, the legendary Mick Mackey of Limerick later said of John "a tough bony divil, oh you would know all about it if you got past him alright". John held the honour of being the oldest man ever to captain an All-Ireland winning team at either hurling or football when he lifted the Liam McCarthy at the age of 37 after the 1945 final, but this honor is subsequently held by Jim Ware who at the age of 40 captained Waterford to the 1948 All Ireland defeat of Dublin. His grandson, Pa Bourke is a current member of the Tipperary panel and won an All Ireland medal in 2010 and also appeared as a substitute in the 2011 final loss to Kilkenny, a game in which Pa scored Tipperary's only goal.

John Maher died in 1990 just before that year's Munster final. He was posthumously honoured in 1999 when the Killinan end of Semple Stadium was renamed the Maher Terrace in his honour.

== Playing career ==
=== Club ===
Maher played his club hurling with the legendary Thurles Sarsfields club and enjoyed much success. He won his first senior county title in 1929 to begin a remarkable run of success. In all, he won nine county titles with 'the Sars' club. Maher's other county medals came in 1935, 1936, 1938, 1939, 1942 and a three-in-a-row in 1944, 1945 and 1946.

=== Inter-county ===
Maher made his senior debut for Tipperary in the National Hurling League 1929–30. His first outing proved less than successful; however, Tipp bounced back in 1930. That year Maher collected his first Munster title as Tipperary trounced Clare. The subsequent All-Ireland final saw Dublin provide the opposition. The first half was a close affair; however, goals by Martin Kennedy and captain John Joe Callanan gave Tipp the edge. The Munster men hung on to win by 2–7 to 1–3, giving Maher his first All-Ireland medal.

Tipp went into decline for the next few years as Limerick emerged as the dominant team in Munster. Tipperary returned to the big time in 1937. That year Maher collected a second Munster medal as his side defeated Limerick, the reigning All-Ireland champions, in the provincial decider. Tipp later qualified for the All-Ireland final. The game itself was played in FitzGerald Stadium, Killarney and Kilkenny provided the opposition. The game saw a surprisingly overwhelming victory for Tipp on a score line of 3–11 to 0–3. It was Maher's second All-Ireland medal.

Tipperary hurling faced a traumatic few years following this victory. The county was excluded from the provincial championship in 1941 due to an outbreak of foot-and-mouth disease in the county. As a result of this Cork were declared Munster champions and went on to win the All-Ireland title. In the delayed Munster final Tipp gained their revenge on Cork and Maher collected a third Munster medal.

In 1945 Tipperary were back at the top table in Munster once again. That year Maher was appointed captain of the Tipperary team. He won a fourth Munster title that year as Tipp defeated Limerick. The subsequent All-Ireland final saw Kilkenny provide the opposition, however, the game was a much closer affair than the previous meeting, Tipp took a 4–3 to 0–3 lead at half-time, however, 'the Cats' came storming back after the interval. Tipp held on to win by 5–6 to 3-6 and Maher collected a third All-Ireland medal and the Liam MacCarthy Cup.

Maher played for one final season in 1946, however, Tipp were defeated in their opening game. Maher retired from inter-county hurling shortly afterwards.

=== Provincial ===
Maher also lined out with Munster in the inter-provincial hurling competition and enjoyed much success winning six Railway Cup medals. He first played for his province in the Railway Cup in 1934 and captured his first winners' medal that year. Maher captured further titles in 1937, 1938, 1940, 1943 and 1946.

== Honours ==
Thurles Sarsfields

- Tipperary Senior Hurling Championship (9): 1929, 1935, 1936, 1938, 1939, 1942, 1944 (c), 1945 (c), 1946
- Mid Tipperary Senior Hurling Championship (9): 1929, 1935, 1936, 1938, 1939, 1942, 1944 (c), 1945 (c), 1946

Tipperary

- All-Ireland Senior Hurling Championship (3): 1930, 1937, 1945 (c)
- Munster Senior Hurling Championship (4): 1930, 1937, 1941, 1945

Munster

- Railway Cup (6): 1934, 1937, 1938, 1940, 1943, 1946

Sporting positions
Preceded by	Tipperary Senior Hurling Captain; 1945	Succeeded by
Achievements
Preceded by Seán Condon	All-Ireland Senior Hurling winning captain 1945	Succeeded by Christy Ring
