= Phil Cahill =

Irish hurler (1899–1945)

Personal information
- Native name: Pilib Ó Cathail (Irish)
- Born: 31 August 1899 Holycross, County Tipperary, Ireland
- Died: 8 September 1945 (aged 46) Thurles, County Tipperary, Ireland
- Occupation: Farmer

Sport
- Sport: Hurling
- Position: Left wing-forward
Clubs
- Years: Club
- Holycross–Ballycahill; Boherlahan–Dualla; Moycarkey-Borris
Club titles
- Tipperary titles: 4
Inter-county
- Years: County
- 1922–1933: Tipperary
Inter-county titles
- Munster titles: 3
- All-Irelands: 2
- NHL: 1

Philip Cahill (31 August 1899 – 8 September 1945) was an Irish hurler. At club he played with Holycross–Ballycahill, Boherlahan–Dualla and Moycarkey-Borris, and also lined out at inter-county level with the Tipperary senior hurling team.

== Career ==
Cahill first played hurling at club level with Holycross–Ballycahill. He later won Tipperary SHC medals with a Mid Selection (Boherlahan) in 1922 and with a South Selection (Boherlahan) in 1924. Cahill ended his career with the Moycarkey-Borris club, with whom he won back-to-back Tipperary SHC titles in 1932 and 1933.

At inter-county level, Cahill earned selection to the Tipperary senior hurling team in 1922. He made his debut a year later, however, he was dropped for the 1923 Munster final. Cahill regained his place in 1924 and claimed his first Munster SHC medal that year. He won a second consecutive Munster SHC medal the following year before winning his first All-Ireland SHC medal after a 5-06 to 1-05 defeat of Galway in the 1925 All-Ireland final.

Cahill added a National Hurling League medal to his collection in 1928. He won his third Munster SHC after a defeat of Clare in 1930. Cahill lined out at wing-forward when Tipperary beat Dublin in the 1930 All-Ireland final. He also spent six consecutive years with the Munster inter-provincial team and won four consecutive Railway Cup medals from 1928 to 1931.

== Death ==
Cahill died at the District Hospital in Thurles on 8 September 1955, at the age of 46.

== Honours ==
Boherlahan-Dualla

- Tipperary Senior Hurling Championship: 1922, 1924

Moycarkey=Borris

- Tipperary Senior Hurling Championship: 1932, 1933

Tipperary

- All-Ireland Senior Hurling Championship: 1930
- Munster Senior Hurling Championship: 1924, 1925, 1930
- National Hurling League: 1927–28

Munster

- Railway Cup: 1928, 1929, 1930, 1931
