= Jimmy Ryan (hurler) =

Irish hurler

Personal information
- Native name: Séamus Ó Riain (Irish)
- Born: 1943 (age 82–83) Carrick-on-Suir, County Tipperary, Ireland
- Occupation: Miloko operative
- Height: 5 ft 9 in (175 cm)

Sport
- Sport: Hurling
- Position: Centre-forward
Club
- Years: Club
- Carrick Davins
Club titles
- Tipperary titles: 2
- Munster titles: 1
Inter-county
- Years: County
- 1964-1971: Tipperary
Inter-county titles
- Munster titles: 1
- All-Irelands: 0
- NHL: 1
- All Stars: 0

James Ryan (born 1943) is an Irish former hurling coach and player. At club level, he played with Carrick Davins and at inter-county level was a member of the Tipperary senior hurling team.

== Playing career ==
Ryan first played hurling at club level with Carrick Davins. After winning a Tipperary JAHC title in 1963, he won consecutive Tipperary SHC medals in 1966 and 1967. Ryan was also part of the Carrick Davins team that won the Munster Club SHC title after a defeat of Ballygunner in 1966. He was involved in all 11 of the clubs South Tipperary SHC successes between 1965 and 1979.

At inter-county level, Ryan first played for Tipperary alongside his brother P. J. Ryan as a member of the under-21 team that beat Wexford in the 1964 All-Ireland under-21 final. He also joined the intermediate and senior teams that year. Ryan won a National League–Munster SHC double in 1968 before being beaten by Wexford in that year's All-Ireland final.

== Coaching career ==
In retirement from playing, Ryan became involved in team management and coaching at club level with Carrick Davins. He was also a selector when Tipperary won the Munster MHC title in 1993. Ryan also spent two years as coach of Tipperary's junior team.

== Honours ==
=== Player ===
Carrick Davins

- Munster Senior Club Hurling Championship: 1966
- Tipperary Senior Hurling Championship: 1966, 1967
- South Tipperary Senior Hurling Championship: 1965, 1966, 1967, 1969, 1971, 1972, 1973, 1975, 1976, 1977, 1979 (c)
- Tipperary Junior A Hurling Championship: 1963

Tipperary

- Munster Senior Hurling Championship: 1968
- National Hurling League: 1967–68
- All-Ireland Under-21 Hurling Championship: 1964
- Munster Under-21 Hurling Championship: 1964

=== Management ===
Tipperary

- Munster Minor Hurling Championship: 1993
