= Jimmy Lanigan =

Irish hurler

Personal information
- Native name: Séamus Ó Lonagáin (Irish)
- Born: 20 April 1910 Ballycahill, County Tipperary, Ireland
- Died: 9 March 1992 (aged 81) Thurles, County Tipperary, Ireland
- Occupation: Fitter

Sport
- Sport: Hurling
- Position: Right wing-back
Club
- Years: Club
- Thurles Sarsfields
Club titles
- Tipperary titles: 9
Inter-county
- Years: County
- 1930-1940: Tipperary
Inter-county titles
- Munster titles: 2
- All-Irelands: 2
- NHL: 0

James Lanigan (20 April 1910 – 9 March 1992) was an Irish hurler. At club level he played with Thurles Sarsfields and was the All-Ireland Championship-winning captain with the Tipperary senior hurling team in 1937.

== Playing career ==
Lanigan first came to prominence at inter-county level as a member of the Tipperary junior team in 1929 before being drafted onto the senior side for the 1930 Munster Championship. He won his first All-Ireland medal in his debut year after Tipperary's victory over Dublin in the final. Lanigan captained the team to All-Ireland success in 1937 after lining out at right wing-back in the defeat of Kilkenny at FitzGerald Stadium. His other hurling honours include two Munster Championships, nine senior county championship medals, including five as captain, with Thurles Sarsfields and Railway Cup medal as captain of Munster.

== Later life and death ==
Lanigan, who remained unmarried throughout his life, worked as a fitter in his native Thurles. He died aged 81 on 9 March 1992 after being involved in a traffic collision.

== Honours ==
Thurles Sarsfields

- Tipperary Senior Hurling Championship (9): 1929, 1935 (c), 1936 (c), 1938 (c), 1939 (c), 1942 (c), 1944, 1945, 1946

Tipperary

- All-Ireland Senior Hurling Championship (2): 1930, 1937 (c)
- Munster Senior Hurling Championship (2): 1930, 1937 (c)

Munster

- Railway Cup (1): 1938 (c)

Sporting positions
Preceded by Phil Purcell	Tipperary Senior Hurling Captain; 1936-1937	Succeeded by Paddy Ryan
Achievements
Preceded by Mick Mackey	All-Ireland Senior Hurling Final winning captain 1937	Succeeded by Mick Daniels
