= Brian Kenny (hurler) =

Irish hurler (1938–2022)

Personal information
- Native name: Brian Ó Cionnaith (Irish)
- Born: 1938 Carrick-on-Suir, County Tipperary, Ireland
- Died: 22 August 2022 (aged 84) Enniscorthy, County Wexford, Ireland
- Occupation: Garda Síochána
- Height: 5 ft 11 in (180 cm)

Sport
- Sport: Hurling
- Position: Full-back
Clubs
- Years: Club
- Carrick Davins; St Aidan's, Enniscorthy
Club titles
- Tipperary titles: 2
- Munster titles: 1
Inter-county
- Years: County
- 1967-1968: Tipperary
Inter-county titles
- Munster titles: 1
- All-Irelands: 0
- NHL: 1
- All Stars: 0

Patrick Brian Kenny (1938 – 22 August 2022) was an Irish hurler. At club level, he played with Carrick Davins and St Aidan's, Enniscorthy and at inter-county level was a member of the Tipperary senior hurling team.

== Career ==
Kenny first played hurling at club level with Carrick Davins. He transferred to the St Aidan's club in Enniscorthy and lined out with the club between 1960 and 1965. Kenny returned to the Davins club won consecutive Tipperary SHC medals in 1966 and 1967. He was also part of the Carrick Davins team that won the Munster Club SHC title after a defeat of Ballygunner in 1966.

At inter-county level, Kenny never played for Tipperary at underage levels but joined the senior team following club success with Carrick Davins. He won a National League–Munster SHC double in 1968 before being a substitute on the team beaten by Wexford in that year's All-Ireland final.

== Death ==
Kenny died on 22 August 2022, at the age of 84.

== Honours ==
Carrick Davins

- Munster Senior Club Hurling Championship: 1966
- Tipperary Senior Hurling Championship: 1966, 1967

Tipperary

- Munster Senior Hurling Championship: 1968
- National Hurling League: 1967–68
