= 1940 Tipperary Senior Hurling Championship =

Annual hurling competition season

- Dates: 8 September – 13 October 1940
- Teams: 4
- Champions: Moycarkey–Borris (10th title); Tom Kennedy (captain)
- Runners-up: Cashel King Cormacs

Tournament statistics
- Matches played: 3
- Goals scored: 21 (7 per match)
- Points scored: 21 (7 per match)

The 1940 Tipperary Senior Hurling Championship was the 49th staging of the Tipperary Senior Hurling Championship since its establishment by the Tipperary County Board] in 1887. The championship ran from 8 September to 13 October 1940.

Thurles Sarsfields were the defending champions.

The final was played on 13 October 1940 at Thurles Sportsfield, between Moycarkey–Borris and Cashel King Cormacs, in what was their second meeting in the final overall. Moycarkey–Borris won the match by 4–07 to 4–02 to claim their 10th championship title overall and a first title in three years.

== Qualification ==
Championship	Champions
Mid Tipperary Senior Hurling Championship	Moycarkey–Borris
North Tipperary Senior Hurling Championship	Kilruane MacDonaghs
South Tipperary Senior Hurling Championship	Killenaule
West Tipperary Senior Hurling Championship	Cashel King Cormacs

== Results ==
=== Semi-finals ===
8 September 1940 Semi-final	Moycarkey–Borris	4-05 - 3-01	Killenaule	Clonmel Sportsfield

15 September 1940 Semi-final	Cashel King Cormacs	3-04 - 3-02	Kilruane MacDonaghs	Páirc Shíleáin

=== Final ===
13 October 1940 Final	Moycarkey–Borris	4-07 - 4-02	Cashel King Cormacs	Thurles Sportsfield
