= Jackie Walsh (hurler) =

Tipperary hurler

Personal information
- Native name: Seánie Breathnach (Irish)
- Born: 1946 (age 79–80) Carrick-on-Suir, County Tipperary, Ireland

Sport
- Sport: Hurling
- Position: Right corner-forward
Club
- Years: Club
- Carrick Davins
Club titles
- Tipperary titles: 2
- Munster titles: 1
Inter-county
- Years: County
- 1977: Tipperary
Inter-county titles
- Munster titles: 0
- All-Irelands: 0
- NHL: 0
- All Stars: 0

John Walsh (born 1946) is an Irish former hurler. At club level, he played with Carrick Davins and at inter-county level with the Tipperary senior hurling team.

== Playing career ==
Walsh began his club career with Carrick Davins at juvenile and underage levels. After progressing to adult level, he went on to win eleven South Tipperary SHC titles between 1965 and 1979. Walsh also won back-to-back Tipperary SHC medals in 1965 and 1966 after respective defeats of Lorrha and Roscrea. He also claimed a Munster Club SHC medal after a 2-17 to 1-11 defeat of Ballygunner in 1966.

At inter-county level, Walsh first played for Tipperary during a two-year tenure with the minor team. His three successive years with the under-21 team saw him win an All-Ireland U21HC medal after lining out at corner-forward in the 1-08 to 1-07 win over Dublin in the 1967 All-Ireland under-21 final. Walsh lined out with the senior team in 1977.

== Coaching career ==
In retirement from playing, Walsh became involved in team management and coaching. He was a selector with the Tipperary junior football team in 1996.

== Honours ==
Carrick Davins

- Munster Senior Club Hurling Championship: 1966
- Tipperary Senior Hurling Championship: 1966, 1967
- South Tipperary Senior Hurling Championship: 1965, 1966, 1967, 1969, 1971, 1972, 1973, 1975, 1976, 1977, 1979

Tipperary

- All-Ireland Under-21 Hurling Championship: 1967
- Munster Under-21 Hurling Championship: 1967
