= Jimmy O'Loughlin =

Irish hurler

Personal information
- Native name: Séamus Ó Lochlain (Irish)
- Born: 19 January 1902 Thurles, County Tipperary, Ireland
- Died: 29 April 1959 (aged 57) Thurles, County Tipperary, Ireland
- Occupation: Farmer

Sport
- Sport: Hurling
- Position: Right corner-back
Club
- Years: Club
- Thurles Sarsfields
Club titles
- Tipperary titles: 1
Inter-county
- Years: County
- 1927-1933: Tipperary
Inter-county titles
- Munster titles: 1
- All-Irelands: 1
- NHL: 0

James O'Loughlin (19 January 1902 – 29 April 1959) was an Irish hurler. At club he played with Thurles Sarsfields, and also lined out at inter-county level with various Tipperary teams.

== Career ==
O'Loughlin first played hurling at club level with Thurles Sarsfields. He won several Mid Tipperary SHC medals, before claiming a Tipperary SHC medal after a defeat of Toomevara in 1929.

At inter-county level, O'Loughlin first played for Tipperary as a member of the junior team in 1923. He won an All-Ireland JHC medal the following year after a 5–05 to 1–02 defeat of Galway in the final. O'Loughlin was promoted to the senior team in 1927. He won a Munster SHC after a defeat of Clare in 1930. O'Loughlin lined out at corner-back when Tipperary beat Dublin in the 1930 All-Ireland final. He continued to line out until his retirement in 1933.

== Coaching career ==
In retirement from playing, O'Loughlin became involved in coaching. He was part of the seven-man selection committee when Tipperary won the All-Ireland SHC after a defeat of Kilkenny in 1937.

== Death ==
O'Loughlin died from injuries sustained in a fall on his farm on 29 April 1959, at the age of 57.

== Honours ==
=== Player ===
Thurles Sarsfields

- Tipperary Senior Hurling Championship: 1929

Tipperary

- All-Ireland Senior Hurling Championship: 1930
- Munster Senior Hurling Championship: 1930
- All-Ireland Junior Hurling Championship: 1924
- Munster Junior Hurling Championship: 1924

=== Selector ===
Tipperary

- All-Ireland Senior Hurling Championship: 1937
- Munster Senior Hurling Championship: 1937
