= John Joe Hayes =

Irish hurler

Personal information
- Native name: Seán Seosamh Ó hAodha (Irish)
- Born: 27 June 1895 Littleton, County Tipperary, Ireland
- Died: 8 November 1979 (aged 84) Littleton, County Tipperary, Ireland
- Occupation: Farmer

Sport
- Sport: Hurling
- Position: Left corner-back
Club
- Years: Club
- Moycarkey–Borris
Club titles
- Tipperary titles: 4
Inter-county
- Years: County
- 1917-1927: Tipperary
Inter-county titles
- Munster titles: 3
- All-Irelands: 1
- NHL: 0

John Joseph Hayes (27 June 1895 – 8 November 1979) was an Irish hurler. At club level he played with Moycarkey–Borris and was also a member of the Tipperary senior hurling team. He usually lined out as a corner-back.

== Career ==
Hayes first came to prominence as a hurler with the Moycarkey–Borris club. In a career that spanned three decades, he won four County Championship titles, including one as team captain in 1926. Hayes first appeared on the inter-county scene as a member of the Tipperary senior hurling team in 1917. It was the first year of a decade-long association with the team, culminating with the winning of the All-Ireland Championship in 1925. Hayes's other honours include three Munster Championship medals, while he was also included on the Ireland team for the 1924 Tailteann Games.

== Personal life and death ==
Hayes was born in the townland of Ballyerk in Littleton, County Tipperary in June 1895. The second of six surviving children born to Daniel and Johanna Hayes (née Dywer), he spent his entire working life as a farmer. Hayes is the subject of "the Tipperary Hurler", a painting by Limerick-born artist Seán Keating.

Hayes died aged 84 on 8 November 1979.

== Honours ==
Moycarkey–Borris

- Tipperary Senior Hurling Championship: 1926 (c), 1932, 1933, 1934
- Mid Tipperary Senior Hurling Championship: 1922, 1923, 1924, 1926 (c), 1930, 1931, 1932, 1933, 1934

Tipperary

- All-Ireland Senior Hurling Championship: 1925
- Munster Senior Hurling Championship: 1922, 1924, 1925
