= 1943 Tipperary Senior Hurling Championship =

Annual hurling competition season

- Dates: 12 September – 3 October 1943
- Teams: 4
- Champions: Éire Óg Annacarty (1st title); Johnny Ryan (captain)
- Runners-up: Moycarkey-Borris; Johnny Ryan (captain)

Tournament statistics
- Matches played: 2
- Goals scored: 14 (7 per match)
- Points scored: 17 (8.5 per match)

The 1943 Tipperary Senior Hurling Championship was the 52nd staging of the Tipperary Senior Hurling Championship since its establishment by the Tipperary County Board in 1887. The championship ran from 12 September to 3 October 1943.

Thurles Sarsfields were the defending champions.

The final was played on 3 October 1943 at Thurles Sportsfield, between Éire Óg Annacarty and Moycarkey–Borris, in what was their first ever meeting in the final. Éire Óg Annacarty won the match by 4–03 to 2–04 to claim their first ever championship title.

== Qualification ==
| Championship | Champions |
|---|---|
| Mid Tipperary Senior Hurling Championship | Moycarkey–Borris |
| North Tipperary Senior Hurling Championship | Kiladangan |
| South Tipperary Senior Hurling Championship | Killenaule |
| West Tipperary Senior Hurling Championship | Éire Óg Annacarty |

== Results ==
=== Semi-finals ===
| 12 September 1943 Semi-final | Moycarkey–Borris | 6-06 - 2-04 | Kiladangan | Borrisoleigh Grounds |

| 19 September 1943 Semi-final | Éire Óg Annacarty | w/o - scr. | Killenaule | Leahy Park |

=== Final ===
| 3 October 1943 Final | Éire Óg Annacarty | 4-03 - 2-04 | Moycarkey–Borris | Thurles Sportsfield |
