= 1945 Tipperary Senior Hurling Championship =

Annual hurling competition season

- Dates: 14 October – 25 November 1945
- Teams: 4
- Champions: Thurles Sarsfields (15th title); John Maher (captain)
- Runners-up: Roscrea; Martin Loughnane (captain)

Tournament statistics
- Matches played: 4
- Goals scored: 28 (7 per match)
- Points scored: 30 (7.5 per match)

The 1945 Tipperary Senior Hurling Championship was the 54th staging of the Tipperary Senior Hurling Championship since its establishment by the Tipperary County Board in 1887. The championship ran from 14 October to 25 November 1945.

Thurles Sarsfields were the defending champions.

The final, a replay, was played on 25 November 1945 at Clonmel Sportsfield, between Thurles Sarsfields and Roscrea, in what was their first meeting in the final in nine years. Thurles Sarsfields won the match by 1–04 to 1–00 to claim their 15th championship title overall and a second consecutive title.

== Qualification ==
Championship	Champions
Mid Tipperary Senior Hurling Championship	Thurles Sarsfields
North Tipperary Senior Hurling Championship	Roscrea
South Tipperary Senior Hurling Championship	Carrick Swans
West Tipperary Senior Hurling Championship	Cashel King Cormacs

== Results ==
=== Semi-finals ===
14 October 1945 Semi-final	Thurles Sarsfields	6-03 - 5-02	Carrick Swans	Leahy Park

21 October 1945 Semi-final	Roscrea	5-07 - 3-03	Cashel King Cormacs	Thurles Sportsfield

=== Final ===
11 November 1945 Final	Thurles Sarsfields	4-04 - 3-07	Roscrea	MacDonagh Park

=== Final replay ===
25 November 1945 Final replay	Thurles Sarsfields	1-04 - 1-00	Roscrea	Thurles Sportsfield
