= 1938 Tipperary Senior Hurling Championship =

Annual hurling competition season

- Dates: 21 August – 25 September 1938
- Teams: 4
- Champions: Thurles Sarsfields (11th title); J. Lanigan (captain)
- Runners-up: Kildangan; M. Kennedy (captain)

Tournament statistics
- Matches played: 3
- Goals scored: 23 (7.67 per match)
- Points scored: 22 (7.33 per match)

The 1938 Tipperary Senior Hurling Championship was the 47th staging of the Tipperary Senior Hurling Championship since its establishment by the Tipperary County Board in 1887. The championship ran from 21 August to 25 September 1938.

Moycarkey-Borris were the defending champions.

The final was played on 25 September 1938 at Borrisoleigh Grounds, between Thurles Sarsfields and Kildangan, in what was their first ever meeting in the final. Thurles Sarsfields won the match by 7–07 to 2–02 to claim their 11th championship title overall and a first title in two years.

== Qualification ==
Championship	Champions
Mid Tipperary Senior Hurling Championship	Thurles Sarsfields
North Tipperary Senior Hurling Championship	Kildangan
South Tipperary Senior Hurling Championship	Fethard
West Tipperary Senior Hurling Championship	Knockavilla–Donaskeigh Kickhams

== Results ==
=== Semi-finals ===
21 August 1938 Semi-final	Kildangan	4-03 - 3-03	Fethard	Thurles Sportsfield

4 September 1938 Semi-final	Thurles Sarsfields	5-07 - 2-00	Knockavilla–Donaskeigh Kickhams	Clonoulty Grounds

=== Final ===
25 September 1938 Final	Thurles Sarsfields	7-07 - 2-02	Kildangan	Borrisoleigh Grounds
