= 1946 Tipperary Senior Hurling Championship =

Annual hurling competition season

- Dates: 27 October – 17 November 1946
- Teams: 4
- Champions: Thurles Sarsfields (16th title); Ger Cornally (captain)
- Runners-up: Carrick Swans

Tournament statistics
- Matches played: 3
- Goals scored: 17 (5.67 per match)
- Points scored: 32 (10.67 per match)

The 1946 Tipperary Senior Hurling Championship was the 55th staging of the Tipperary Senior Hurling Championship since its establishment by the Tipperary County Board in 1887. The championship ran from 27 October to 17 November 1946.

Thurles Sarsfields were the defending champions.

The final was played on 17 November 1946 at Clonmel Sportsfield, between Thurles Sarsfields and Carrick Swans, in what was their first meeting in the final in 11 years. Thurles Sarsfields won the match by 4–05 to 0–03 to claim their 16th championship title overall and a third consecutive title.

== Qualification ==
Championship	Champions
Mid Tipperary Senior Hurling Championship	Thurles Sarsfields
North Tipperary Senior Hurling Championship	Toomevara
South Tipperary Senior Hurling Championship	Carrick Swans
West Tipperary Senior Hurling Championship	Knockavilla–Donaskeigh Kickhams

== Results ==
=== Semi-finals ===
27 October 1946 Semi-final	Carrick Swans	3-07 - 2-07	Toomevara	Thurles Sportsfield

3 November 1946 Semi-final	Thurles Sarsfields	7-06 - 1-04	Knockavilla–Donaskeigh Kickhams	Leahy Park

=== Final ===
17 November 1946 Final	Thurles Sarsfields	4-05 - 0-03	Carrick Swans	Clonmel Sportsfield
