= 1967 Tipperary Senior Hurling Championship =

Annual hurling competition season

- Dates: 17 September – 29 October 1967
- Teams: 8
- Champions: Carrick Davins (2nd title); Mick Roche (captain)
- Runners-up: Roscrea

Tournament statistics
- Matches played: 8
- Goals scored: 38 (4.75 per match)
- Points scored: 132 (16.5 per match)
- Top scorer(s): Jackie Hannon (3-05); Mick Roche (0–14)

The 1967 Tipperary Senior Hurling Championship was the 76th staging of the Tipperary Senior Hurling Championship since its establishment by the Tipperary County Board in 1887. The championship ran from 17 September to 29 October 1967.

Carrick Davins were the defending champions.

The final was played on 29 October 1967 at Thurles Sportsfield, between Carrick Davins and Roscrea, in what was their first ever meeting in the final. Carrick Davins won the match by 2–10 to 2–07 to claim their second consecutive championship title.

== Qualification ==
Championship	Champions	Second team
Mid Tipperary Senior Hurling Championship	Moycarkey–Borris	Drom & Inch
North Tipperary Senior Hurling Championship	Roscrea	Moneygall
South Tipperary Senior Hurling Championship	Carrick Davins	Slievenamon
West Tipperary Senior Hurling Championship	Éire Óg Annacarty	Arravale Rovers

== Results ==
=== Quarter-finals ===
17 September 1967 Quarter-final	Moycarkey–Borris	2-13 - 2-11	Moneygall	Páirc Shíleáin
	J Flanagan 1-3, L Hennessy 1-0, B Nolan 0-2, P Barry 0-2, D Fitzgerald 0-2, D Ryan 0-1, R Buckley 0-1, B Ryan 0-1, P Ryan 0-1.		B Collison 1-3, P Ryan 0-5, S Doherty 1-1, J Ryan 0-1, D Kennedy 0-1.

17 September 1967 Quarter-final	Éire Óg Annacarty	2-06 - 0-03	Slievenamon	Clonmel GAA Ground
	J Cummins 1-1, J Hanley 1-0, P Corbett 0-3, H Cummins 0-2.		G Danagher 0-2, Connolly 0-1.

17 September 1967 Quarter-final	Carrick Davins	7-07 - 2-04	Arravale Rovers	Clonmel GAA Ground
	J Ryan 2-1, C Broderick 2-1, J Walsh 1-0, J Roche 1-0, R Walsh 1-0, M Roche 0-2, PJ Ryan 0-1.		T Moloney 1-0, S O'Dwyer 1-0, L Kennedy 0-2, S Ryan 0-1.

24 September 1967 Quarter-final	Roscrea	0-10 - 2-04	Drom & Inch	Thurles Sportsfield
	J Hannon 0-3, L Brussels 0-2, H Loughnane 0-2, P Roland 0-1, M Minogue 0-1.		PJ Broderick 1-1, J Harkins 1-0, M Kenny 0-2, J McGrath 0-1.

1 October 1967 Quarter-final replay	Roscrea	5-17 - 2-02	Drom & Inch	Thurles Sportsfield
	M Minogue 1-4, J Tynan 1-3, L Brussels 1-2, J Hannon 1-1, H Loughnane 1-0, M Nolan 0-3, P Dynan 0-3,		M Ryan 1-0, O Quinn 1-0, P Ryan 0-1, C Ryan 0-1.

=== Semi-finals ===
15 October 1967 Semi-final	Roscrea	3-14 - 1-07	Moycarkey–Borris	Thurles Sportsfield
	P Dynan 1-7, J Hannon 2-1, J Tynan 0-3, M Nolan 0-2, P Roland 0-1.		J Flanagan 1-4, B Nolan 0-2, P Ryan 0-1.

15 October 1967 Semi-final	Carick Davins	5-15 - 0-02	Éire Óg Annacarty	Thurles Sportsfield
	C Broderick 2-0, T Ryan 1-3, J Ryan 1-2, J Walsh 1-2, M Roche 0-3, PJ Ryan 0-3, N Butler 0-1, M Ryan 0-1.		P Corbett 0-1, D Tuohy 0-1.

=== Final ===
29 October 1967 Final	Carrick Davins	2-10 - 2-07	Roscrea	Thurles Sportsfield
	M Roche 0-9, J Roche 1-1, T Ryan 1-0.		B Hogan 1-1, D Moloney 1-0, P Roland 0-2, L Brussels 0-2, M Minogue 0-1, P Dynan 0-1.

== Championship statistics ==
=== Top scorers ===
Rank	Player	Club	Tally	Total	Matches	Average
1	Jackie Hannon	Roscrea	3-05	14	3	4.66
1	Mick Roche	Carrick Davins	0-14	14	3	4.66
3	Con Broderick	Carrick Davins	4-01	13	3	4.33
3	John Flanagan	Moycarkey–Borris	2-07	13	2	6.50
3	Pat Dynan	Roscrea	1-10	13	3	4.33
