= 1937 All-Ireland Senior Hurling Championship final =

1937 All-Ireland Senior Hurling Final
- Event: 1937 All-Ireland Senior Hurling Championship
| Tipperary | Kilkenny |
| 3-11 | 0-3 |
- Date: 5 September 1937
- Venue: FitzGerald Stadium, Killarney
- Referee: J. Flaherty (Offaly)
- Attendance: 67,629

The 1937 All-Ireland Senior Hurling Championship Final was a hurling match played at Fitzgerald Stadium in Killarney, County Kerry on 5 September 1937 to determine the winners of the 1937 All-Ireland Senior Hurling Championship, the 51st season of the All-Ireland Senior Football Championship, a tournament organised by the Gaelic Athletic Association for the champions of the three hurling provinces of Ireland. The final was contested by Tipperary of Munster and Kilkenny of Leinster, with Tipperary winning by 3-11 to 0-3.

For the first time since 1909 the All-Ireland final was played at a venue other than Croke Park. Construction of the new Cusack Stand was eleven months behind schedule due to a strike by builders leaving Croke Park unusable.

The first half failed to live up to expectations as Tipperary, with a number of bright youngsters in their side, swept Kilkenny aside. Tommy Doyle, one of Tipperary's newcomers, had his side a point clear virtually from the throw-in. Kilkenny, with a somewhat veteran team, failed to match a speedier Tipperary and only managed two points in the first half. Tipperary finished the half with 2-8, with goals by Dinny Murphy and Jimmy Coffey.

After the interval Jimmy Cooney was a key player for Tipperary at midfield. Kilkenny introduced veteran Lory Meagher from the substitutes in a bid to improve matters, but Tipperary still dominated. Meagher recorded Kilkenny's solitary score of the second half, a point and the opening score of the half. Tipperary responded with another goal by Dinny Murphy to finally end the game as a contest.

Tipperary's All-Ireland victory was their first since 1930. The win gave them their 12th All-Ireland title over all and put them as outright leaders on the all-time roll of honour. It was their first championship defeat of Kilkenny since the 1916 All-Ireland final.

Kilkenny's All-Ireland defeat was their second successive after being beaten by Limerick in 1936. It was their first championship defeat by Tipperary since the 1913 All-Ireland final.

== Match details ==
1937-09-05
15:15 UTC+1

| Tipperary | 3-11 – 0-3 | Kilkenny |
|---|---|---|
| D. Murphy (2-1), J. Coffey (1-3), T. Doyle (0-2), J. Cooney (0-2), T. Treacy (0-1), D. Mackey (0-1), P. Ryan (0-1). | | P. Phelan (0-1), J. Morrissey (0-1), L. Meagher (0-1). |

FitzGerald Stadium, Killarney
Attendance: 43,638
Referee: J. Flaherty (Offaly)

| Tipperary | Kilkenny |
