= 1944 Tipperary Senior Hurling Championship =

Annual hurling competition season

- Dates: 1 October – 22 October 1944
- Teams: 4
- Champions: Thurles Sarsfields (14th title); John Maher (captain)
- Runners-up: Kilrunae MacDonaghs

Tournament statistics
- Matches played: 3
- Goals scored: 22 (7.33 per match)
- Points scored: 26 (8.67 per match)

The 1944 Tipperary Senior Hurling Championship was the 53rd staging of the Tipperary Senior Hurling Championship since its establishment by the Tipperary County Board in 1887. The championship ran from 1 October to 22 October 1944.

Éire Óg Annacarty were the defending champions.

The final was played on 22 October 1944 at Borrisoleigh Grounds, between Thurles Sarsfields and first-time finalists Kilruane MacDonaghs. Thurles Sarsfields won the match by 6–03 to 1–04 to claim their 14th championship title overall and a first title in two years.

== Qualification ==
Championship	Champions
Mid Tipperary Senior Hurling Championship	Thurles Sarsfields
North Tipperary Senior Hurling Championship	Kilruane MacDonaghs
South Tipperary Senior Hurling Championship	Carrick Swans
West Tipperary Senior Hurling Championship	Éire Óg Annacarty

== Results ==
=== Semi-finals ===
1 October 1944 Semi-final	Thurles Sarsfields	8-06 - 3-04	Carrick Swans	Barracks Field

8 October 1944 Semi-final	Kilruane MacDonaghs	3-05 - 1-04	Éire Óg Annacarty	Borrisoleigh Grounds

=== Final ===
22 October 1944 Final	Thurles Sarsfields	6-03 - 1-04	Kilruane MacDonaghs	Borrisoleigh Grounds
