= 1937 Tipperary Senior Hurling Championship =

Annual hurling competition season

- Dates: 15 August – 19 September 1937
- Teams: 4
- Champions: Moycarkey–Borris (9th title); Patrick Ryan (captain)
- Runners-up: Cashel King Cormacs; Michael Burke (captain)

Tournament statistics
- Matches played: 3
- Goals scored: 31 (10.33 per match)
- Points scored: 26 (8.67 per match)

The 1937 Tipperary Senior Hurling Championship was the 46th staging of the Tipperary Senior Hurling Championship since its establishment by the Tipperary County Board in 1887. The championship ran from 15 August to 19 September 1937.

Thurles Sarsfields were the defending champions.

The final was played on 19 September 1937 at Thurles Sportsfield, between Moycarkey–Borris and Cashel King Cormacs, in what was their first ever meeting in the final. Moycarkey–Borris won the match by 7–06 to 6–02 to claim their ninth championship title overall and a first title in three years.

== Qualification ==
Championship	Champions
Mid Tipperary Senior Hurling Championship	Moycarkey–Borris
North Tipperary Senior Hurling Championship	Roscrea
South Tipperary Senior Hurling Championship	Fethard
West Tipperary Senior Hurling Championship	Cashel King Cormacs

== Results ==
=== Semi-finals ===
15 August 1937 Semi-final	Cashel King Cormacs	5-03 - 4-03	Roscrea	Borrisoleaigh Grounds

22 August 1937 Semi-final	Moycarkey–Borris	6-10 - 3-02	Fethard	Golden Grounds

=== Final ===
19 September 1937 Final	Moycarkey–Borris	7-06 - 6-02	Cashel King Cormacs	Thurles Sportsfield
