= 1935 Tipperary Senior Hurling Championship =

Annual hurling competition season

- Dates: 29 September – 10 November 1935
- Teams: 4
- Champions: Thurles Sarsfields (9th title); Jimmy Lanigan (captain)
- Runners-up: Carrick Swans; John Dunne (captain)

Tournament statistics
- Matches played: 3
- Goals scored: 22 (7.33 per match)
- Points scored: 18 (6 per match)

The 1935 Tipperary Senior Hurling Championship was the 44th staging of the Tipperary Senior Hurling Championship since its establishment by the Tipperary County Board The championship ran from 29 September to 10 November 1935.

Moycarkey-Borris were the defending champions.

The final was played on 10 November 1935 at Thurles Sportsfield, between Thurles Sarsfields and first-time finalists Carrick Swans. Thurles Sarsfields won the match by 6–05 to 0–02 to claim their ninth championship title overall and a first title in six years.

== Qualification ==
| Championship | Champions |
|---|---|
| Mid Tipperary Senior Hurling Championship | Thurles Sarsfields |
| North Tipperary Senior Hurling Championship | Newport |
| South Tipperary Senior Hurling Championship | Carrick Swans |
| West Tipperary Senior Hurling Championship | Knockavilla–Donaskeigh Kickhams |

== Results ==
=== Semi-finals ===
| 29 September 1935 Semi-final | Thurles Sarsfields | 7-07 - 0-00 | Newport | St Cronan's Park |

| 13 October 1935 Semi-final | Carrick Swans | 6-02 - 3-02 | Knockavilla–Donaskeigh Kickhams | Clonmel Sportsfield |

=== Final ===
| 10 November 1935 Final | Thurles Sarsfields | 6-05 - 0-02 | Carrick Swans | Thurles Sportsfield |
