= 1934 Tipperary Senior Hurling Championship =

Annual hurling competition season

- Dates: 29 July – 7 October 1934
- Teams: 4
- Champions: Moycarkey–Borris (8th title); Phil Purcell (captain)
- Runners-up: Kilbarron–Kildangan; John Hoctor (captain)

Tournament statistics
- Matches played: 3
- Goals scored: 18 (6 per match)
- Points scored: 26 (8.67 per match)

The 1934 Tipperary Senior Hurling Championship was the 43rd staging of the Tipperary Senior Hurling Championship since its establishment by the Tipperary County Board in 1887. The championship ran from 29 July to 7 October 1934.

Moycarkey–Borris were the defending champions.

The final was played on 7 October 1934 at Thurles Sportsfield, between Moycarkey–Borris and first-time finalists Kilbarron–Kildangan. Moycarkey–Borris won the match by 3–06 to 2–03 to claim their eighth championship title overall and a third consecutive title.

== Qualification ==
Championship	Champions
Mid Tipperary Senior Hurling Championship	Moycarkey–Borris
North Tipperary Senior Hurling Championship	Kilbarron–Kildangan
South Tipperary Senior Hurling Championship	Moyglass
West Tipperary Senior Hurling Championship	Cashel King Cormacs

== Results ==
=== Semi-finals ===
29 July 1934 Semi-final	Moycarkey–Borris	1-07 - 2-02	Cashel King Cormacs	Thurles Sportsfield

26 August 1934 Semi-final	Kilbarron–Kildangan	6-04 - 4-04	Moyglass	Thurles Sportsfield

=== Final ===
7 October 1934 Final	Moycarkey–Borris	3-06 - 2-03	Kilbarron–Kildangan	Thurles Sportsfield
