= 1902 Tipperary Senior Hurling Championship =

Annual hurling competition season

- Champions: Lahorna De Wets (1st title)
- Runners-up: Carrick

The 1902 Tipperary Senior Hurling Championship was the 13th staging of the Tipperary Senior Hurling Championship since its establishment by the Tipperary County Board in 1887.

Lahorna De Wets won the championship after a 7–10 to 1–02 defeat of Carrick in the final. It was the club's only championship title.
