= Bill Higgins (hurler) =

Irish hurler

Personal information
- Native name: Liam Ó hUiginn (Irish)
- Nickname: Lov
- Born: 13 May 1898 Cobh, County Cork, Ireland
- Died: 18 February 1969 (aged 70) Cobh, County Cork, Ireland
- Occupation: Caretaker

Sport
- Sport: Hurling
- Position: Midfield
Clubs
- Years: Club
- Collins; Cobh
Club titles
- Cork titles: 0
Inter-county*
Years	County	Apps (scores)
1925–1927	Cork	11 (1–07)
Inter-county titles
- Munster titles: 2
- All-Irelands: 1
- NHL: 1
- *Inter County team apps and scores correct as of 22:42, 6 April 2015.

William Joseph Higgins (13 May 1898 – 18 February 1969) was an Irish hurler. At club level he played with Cobh and Collins and was also a member of the Cork senior hurling team.

== Career ==
Higgins first played hurling with Cobh before later lining out with the Collins club in Cork. He first appeared on the inter-county scene as a member of the Cork junior hurling team that won the Munster JHC in 1925. Higgins missed the delayed All-Ireland series of games as his performances earned an immediate call-up to the senior team. His debut season was a successful one as Cork made a clean sweep of National League, Munster Championship and All-Ireland titles. Higgins won a second successive provincial title the following year, however, Cork were later beaten by Dublin in the 1927 All-Ireland final.

== Death ==
Higgins died on 18 February 1969, aged 70.

== Honours ==
Cork

- All-Ireland Senior Hurling Championship: 1926
- Munster Senior Hurling Championship: 1926, 1927
- National Hurling League: 1925–26
- Munster Junior Hurling Championship: 1925
