= 1927 Tipperary Senior Hurling Championship =

Annual hurling competition season

- Champions: Boherlahan (8th title); Johnny Leahy (captain)
- Runners-up: Toomevara

The 1927 Tipperary Senior Hurling Championship was the 36th staging of the Tipperary Senior Hurling Championship since its establishment by the Tipperary County Board in 1887.

Boherlahan won the championship after a 4–01 to 1–01 defeat of Toomevara in the final. It was their eighth championship title overall and their first title since 1925.

== Results ==
=== Final ===
2 October 1927 Final	Boherlahan	4-01 - 1-01	Toomevara	Thurles Sportsfield
