= Paul McKenna (hurler) =

Irish hurler

Personal information
- Native name: Pól Mac Cionnaith (Irish)
- Born: 29 June 1903 Borrisokane, County Tipperary, Ireland
- Died: 28 August 1956 (aged 53) Dún Laoghaire, County Dublin, Ireland

Sport
- Sport: Hurling
- Position: Full-back
Clubs
- Years: Club
- Shinrone; Borrisokane
Inter-county
- Years: County
- 1929–1931: Tipperary
Inter-county titles
- Munster titles: 1
- All-Irelands: 1
- NHL: 0

Peter Paul McKenna (29 June 1903 – 28 August 1956) was an Irish hurler. At club he played with Shinrone and Borrisokane, and also lined out at inter-county level with the Tipperary senior hurling team.

== Career ==
McKenna first played hurling with the Shinrone club in Offaly. He won an Offaly JHC medal in 1923, before later transferring, along with his three brothers, to the Borrisokane club. McKenna won a North Tipperary SHC medal with Borrisokane in 1933.

At inter-county level, McKenna followed his brother Tim by earning a call-up to the Tipperary senior hurling team in 1929. He won a Munster SHC after a defeat of Clare in 1930. McKenna, whose brother Jack was also a member of the team, lined out at full-back when Tipperary beat Dublin in the 1930 All-Ireland final. His inter-county career ended the following year.

== Personal life and death ==
His nephews, John McKenna and Tony McKenna, played hurling at various levels with Tipperary in the 1960s. Another nephew, Joe McKenna, played hurling with Offaly before winning an All-Ireland SHC medal with Limerick in 1973. McKenna was a greyhound trainer in later years.

McKenna died from esophageal cancer at St Michael's Hospital, Dún Laoghaire on 28 August 1956, at the age of 53.

== Honours ==
Shinrone

- Offaly Junior Hurling Championship: 1923

Borrisokane

- North Tipperary Senior Hurling Championship: 1933

Tipperary

- All-Ireland Senior Hurling Championship: 1930
- Munster Senior Hurling Championship: 1930
