= 1899 Tipperary Senior Hurling Championship =

Annual hurling competition season

- Champions: Horse & Jockey (1st title)
- Runners-up: Two-Mile Borris

The 1899 Tipperary Senior Hurling Championship was the 10th staging of the Tipperary Senior Hurling Championship since its establishment by the Tipperary County Board in 1887.

Horse & Jockey won the championship after a 3–08 to 2–04 defeat of Tow-Mile Borris in the final replay. It was the club's only championship title.
