= 1905 Tipperary Senior Hurling Championship =

Annual hurling competition season

- Champions: Two-Mile Borris (3rd title)
- Runners-up: Lorrha

The 1905 Tipperary Senior Hurling Championship was the 16th staging of the Tipperary Senior Hurling Championship since its establishment by the Tipperary County Board in 1887.

Two-Mile Borris won the championship after receiving a walkover from Lorrha in the final. It was their third championship title overall and their first title since 1903.
