= 1933 Tipperary Senior Hurling Championship =

Annual hurling competition season

- Dates: 1 October – 12 November 1933
- Teams: 4
- Champions: Moycarkey-Borris (7th title); P. Purcell (captain)
- Runners-up: Borrisokane; J. McKenna (captain)

Tournament statistics
- Matches played: 3
- Goals scored: 14 (4.67 per match)
- Points scored: 24 (8 per match)

The 1933 Tipperary Senior Hurling Championship was the 42nd staging of the Tipperary Senior Hurling Championship since its establishment by the Tipperary County Board in 1887. The championship ran from 1 October to 12 November 1933.

Moycarkey–Borris were the defending champions.

The final was played on 12 November 1933 at Thurles Sportsfield, between Moycarkey–Borris and first-time finalists Borrisokane. Moycarkey–Borris won the match by 1–07 to 1–00 to claim their seventh championship title overall and a second consecutive title.

== Qualification ==
Championship	Champions
Mid Tipperary Senior Hurling Championship	Moycarkey–Borris
North Tipperary Senior Hurling Championship	Borrisokane
South Tipperary Senior Hurling Championship	Carrick Swans
West Tipperary Senior Hurling Championship	Clonoulty

== Results ==
=== Semi-finals ===
1 October 1933 Semi-final	Borrisokane	6-11 - 1-03	Clonoulty	Borrisoleigh Grounds

22 October 1933 Semi-final	Moycarkey–Borris	5-01 - 0-02	Carrick Swans	Boherlahan Grounds

=== Final ===
12 November 1933 Final	Moycarkey–Borris	1-07 - 1-00	Borrisokane	Thurles Sportsfield
