= Phil Purcell =

Phil Purcell may refer to:

- Philip J. Purcell (born 1943), American financial executive
- Phil Purcell (hurler) (1900–1963), Irish hurler
