= Paul McKenna (disambiguation) =

Paul McKenna (born 1963) is an English hypnotist.

Paul McKenna may also refer to:

- Paul McKenna (footballer) (born 1977), English footballer
- Paul McKenna (hurler) (1904–1956), Irish hurler
- Paul McKenna, Scottish musician in the Paul McKenna Band
