= 1925 All-Ireland Junior Hurling Championship =

All Ireland Champions
- Winners: Cork (3rd win)
- Captain: Mick Kenny

All Ireland Runners-up
- Runners-up: Dublin

Provincial Champions
- Munster: Cork
- Leinster: Dublin
- Ulster: Not Played
- Connacht: Galway

The 1925 All-Ireland Junior Hurling Championship was the eighth staging of the All-Ireland Junior Championship since its establishment by the Gaelic Athletic Association in 1912.

Tipperary entered the championship as the defending champions, however, they were beaten by Cork in the Munster semi-final.

The All-Ireland final was played on 4 July 1926 at the Thurles Sportsfield, between Cork and Dublin, in what was their first ever meeting in the final. Cork won the match by 5–06 to 1–00 to claim their third championship title overall and a first title since 1916.

== Results ==
=== All-Ireland Junior Hurling Championship ===
==== All-Ireland semi-final ====
| 6 June 1926 Semi-final | Cork | 5-08 - 1-03 | Galway | Croke Park |

==== All-Ireland final ====
| 4 July 1926 Final | Cork | 5-06 - 1-00 | Dublin | Thurles Sporstfield |
