= 1939 Tipperary Senior Hurling Championship =

Annual hurling competition season

- Dates: 10 September – 8 October 1939
- Teams: 4
- Champions: Thurles Sarsfields (12th title); J. Lanigan (captain)
- Runners-up: Cashel King Cormacs; M. Burke (captain)

Tournament statistics
- Matches played: 3
- Goals scored: 22 (7.33 per match)
- Points scored: 23 (7.67 per match)

The 1939 Tipperary Senior Hurling Championship was the 48th staging of the Tipperary Senior Hurling Championship since its establishment by the Tipperary County Board in 1887. The championship ran from 10 September to 8 October 1939.

Thurles Sarsfields were the defending champions.

The final was played on 8 October 1939 at Boherlahan Grounds, between Thurles Sarsfields and Cashel King Cormacs, in what was their first ever meeting in the final. Thurles Sarsfields won the match by 5–03 to 4–02 to claim their 12th championship title overall and a second consecutive title.

== Qualification ==
Championship	Champions
Mid Tipperary Senior Hurling Championship	Thurles Sarsfields
North Tipperary Senior Hurling Championship	Roscrea
South Tipperary Senior Hurling Championship	Carrick Swans
West Tipperary Senior Hurling Championship	Cashel King Cormacs

== Results ==
=== Semi-finals ===
10 September 1939 Semi-final	Cashel King Cormacs	3-02 - 1-02	Roscrea	Thurles Sportsfield

24 September 1939 Semi-final	Thurles Sarsfields	8-10 - 1-04	Carrick Swans	Clonmel Sportsfield

=== Final ===
8 October 1939 Final	Thurles Sarsfields	5-03 - 4-02	Cashel King Cormacs	Boherlahan Grounds
