= 1925 Tipperary Senior Hurling Championship =

Annual hurling competition season

- Champions: Boherlahan (7th title)
- Runners-up: Thurles Sarsfields

The 1925 Tipperary Senior Hurling Championship was the 34th staging of the Tipperary Senior Hurling Championship since its establishment by the Tipperary County Board in 1887.

Boherlahan were the defending champions.

The final was scheduled to be played on 19 July 1925, between Boherlahan and Thurles Sarsfield, in what would have been their second meeting in the final overall. Thurles Sarsfields withdrew, in protest over the date of the final, and Boherlahan were awarded the title.

== Results ==
=== Semi-final ===
5 July 1925 Semi-final	Boherlahan	5-04 - 2-03	Toomevara/Moneygall	Thurles Sportsfield

=== Final ===
19 July 1925 Final	Boherlahan	w/o - scr.	Thurles Sarsfields
