= 1916 All-Ireland Junior Hurling Championship =

All Ireland Champions
- Winners: Cork (2nd win)
- Captain: Michael Brophy

All Ireland Runners-up
- Runners-up: Kilkenny

Provincial Champions
- Munster: Cork
- Leinster: Kilkenny
- Ulster: Not Played
- Connacht: Not Played

The 1916 All-Ireland Junior Hurling Championship was the fifth staging of the All-Ireland Junior Championship since its establishment by the Gaelic Athletic Association in 1912.

Tipperary entered the championship as the defending champions, however, they were beaten by Cork in the Munster final.

The All-Ireland final was played on 16 September 1917 at the Athletic Grounds in Cork, between Cork and Kilkenny, in what was their first ever meeting in the final. Cork won the match by 4–06 to 3–04 to claim their second championship title overall and a first title since 1912.

== Results ==
=== All-Ireland Junior Hurling Championship ===
==== All-Ireland final ====
17 September 1916 Final	Cork	4-06 - 3-04	Kilkenny	Cork Athletic Grounds
