= 1924 All-Ireland Junior Hurling Championship =

All Ireland Champions
- Winners: Tipperary (3rd win)
- Captain: Phil Purcell

All Ireland Runners-up
- Runners-up: Galway

Provincial Champions
- Munster: Tipperary
- Leinster: Offaly
- Ulster: Not Played
- Connacht: Not Played

The 1924 All-Ireland Junior Hurling Championship was the seventh staging of the All-Ireland Junior Championship since its establishment by the Gaelic Athletic Association in 1912.

Offaly entered the championship as the defending champions.

The All-Ireland final was played on 30 August 1925 at Croke Park in Dublin, between Tipperary and Galway, in what was their first ever meeting in a final. Tipperary won the match by 5-05 to 1-02 to claim their third championship title overall and a first title since 1915.

== All-Ireland Junior Hurling Championship ==
=== All-Ireland final ===
30 August 1925 Final	Tipperary	5-05 - 1-02	Galway	Croke Park
