= 1966 Munster Senior Club Hurling Championship =

- Dates: 19 March – 20 August 1967
- Teams: 7
- Champions: Carrick Davins (1st title); Mick Roche (captain)
- Runners-up: Ballygunner

Tournament statistics
- Matches played: 7
- Goals scored: 41 (5.86 per match)
- Points scored: 139 (19.86 per match)
- Top scorer(s): Mick Roche (3-19)

The 1966 Munster Senior Club Hurling Championship was the third staging of the Munster Senior Club Hurling Championship since its establishment by the Munster Council. The championship, which was open to the champion clubs of 1966, began on 19 March 1967 and ended on 20 August 1967.

On 20 August 1967, Carrick Davins won the championship after a 2-17 to 1-11 defeat of Ballygunner in the final at Clonmel Sportsfield. It remains their only championship title.

Mick Roche from the Carrick Davins club was the championship's top scorer with 3-19.

== Results ==
=== First round ===
19 March 1967 First round	Ballyduff	4-03 - 6-13	Carrick Davins	Austin Stack Park, Tralee
	P O'Sullivan 2-2, M Hennessy 1-0, J O'Neill 1-0, E Diggins 0-1.		M Roche 2-6, J Walsh 3-0, J Ryan 1-4, C Broderick 0-2, PJ Ryan 0-1.

2 April 1967 First round	Patrickswell	3-11 - 3-05	Turloughmore	Gaelic Grounds, Limerick
	J O'Donnell 3-0, R Bennis 0-8, J Shields 0-2, T O'Brien 0-1.		M Cullinane 1-2, P Fahy 1-1, T Duffy 1-0, PJ Qualter 0-1, F Forde 0-1.

30 April 1967 First round	Éire Óg, Ennis	3-05 - 2-08	Avondhu (North Cork)	Cusack Park, Ennis
	M Hanrahan 2-1, A Kinnevane 1-1, J Dunne 0-1, N Pyne 0-1, M Dilliger 0-1.		P Behan 1-1, F Sheedy 1-1, L Sheehan 0-3, J Russell 0-1, D O'Connell 0-1, R Browne 0-1.

18 June 1967 First round replay	Avondhu (North Cork)	3-14 - 2-04	Éire Óg, Ennis	Cork Athletic Grounds, Cork
	D O'Connell 2-3, W Fitzgibbon 1-1, F Sheedy 0-4, J Hogan 0-3, N O'Regan 0-2, L Sheehan 0-1.		M Hanrahan 2-1, J Dunne 0-2, A Kinnevane 0-1.	Referee: J Quaid (Limerick)

=== Semi-finals ===
16 April 1967 Semi-final	Patrickswell	2-08 - 2-09	Carrick Davins	Gaelic Grounds, Limerick
	J O'Gorman 1-0, G Casey 1-0, R Bennis 0-3, P Carey 0-2, J Shields 0-1, J O'Donnell 0-1, T O'Brien 0-1.		J Walsh 1-1, M Roche 0-4, T Ryan 1-0, J Ryan 0-2, R Walsh 0-1, N Butler 0-1.

29 July 1967 Semi-final	Ballygunner	5-11 - 3-10	Avondhu (North Cork)	Fraher Field, Dungarvan
	T Walsh 1-5, J Hearne 1-2, V Connors 1-1, T Hearne 1-1, P Troy 1-0, T Cummins 0-1, J Warren 0-1.		R Browne 2-3, P Behan 1-0, L Sheedy 0-3, N Regan 0-3, G O'Connell 0-1.	Referee: T Foran (Tipperary)

=== Final ===
20 August 1967 Final	Carrick Davins	2-17 - 1-11	Ballygunner	Clonmel Sportsfield, Clonmel
	M Roche 1-9, H Ryan 1-2, T Ryan 0-2, J Ryan 0-2, J Walsh 0-2.		P Hearne 1-1, T Walsh 0-3, W Connors 0-2, P Troy 0-1, T Cummins 0-1, T Hearne 0-1, M Phelan 0-1, J Hearne 0-1.	Referee: P Cronin (Cork)

== Championship statistics ==
=== Miscellaneous ===
- The first round game between Avondhu (North Cork) and Éire Óg, Ennis on 30 April 1966 was the first Munster Championship game to end in a draw.
