= 1924 Tipperary Senior Hurling Championship =

Annual hurling competition season

- Champions: Boherlahan (6th title); Johnny Leahy (captain)
- Runners-up: Moycarkey–Borris; John Joe Hayes (captain)

The 1924 Tipperary Senior Hurling Championship was the 33rd staging of the Tipperary Senior Hurling Championship since its establishment by the Tipperary County Board in 1887.

Boherlahan won the championship after an 8–03 to 1–00 defeat of Moycarkey–Borris in the final. It was their sixth championship title overall and their first title since 1922.

== Results ==
=== Final ===
19 October 1924 Final	Boherlahan	8-03 - 1-00	Moycarkey–Borris	Barracks Field
