= P. J. Ryan (Tipperary hurler) =

Irish hurler

P.J. Ryan
Personal information
- Native name: P.S. Ó Riain (Irish)
- Born: Carrick-on-Suir, County Tipperary

Sport
- Sport: Hurling
- Position: Midfield
Club
- Years: Club
- Carrick Davins
Inter-county
- Years: County
- 1968-1975: Tipperary
Inter-county titles
- Munster titles: 2
- All-Irelands: 1

P.J. Ryan (born 1946 in Carrick-on-Suir, County Tipperary) is a former Irish sportsperson. He played hurling with his local club Carrick Davins and with the Tipperary senior inter-county team from 1968 until 1975.

He won a senior All-Ireland medal in 1971.

== Playing career ==
=== Club ===
Ryan played his club hurling with his local Carrick Davins club and enjoyed much success. He won back-to-back senior county titles in 1966 and 1967. Ryan won a Munster club title in 1966.

=== Inter-county ===
Ryan first came to prominence on the inter-county scene as a member of the Tipperary under-21 hurling team in the early 1960s. He won a Munster title in this grade in 1965, however, Tipp were later beaten by Wexford in the All-Ireland final. Two years later in 1967 Ryan was captain of the under-21 team. That year he collected a second Munster title before later winning an All-Ireland medal following a victory over Dublin in the championship decider.

By the late 1960s Ryan was a regular on the Tipperary senior inter-county team. He won his first senior Munster title in 1968 as Tipp trounced Cork in the provincial decider. Ryan's side later took on Wexford in the All-Ireland final and looked to be cruising to victory. At half-time they led by eight points, however, the Leinstermen fought back to win the game by 5-8 to 3-12. Three years later in 1971 Ryan captured a second senior Munster title as Tipp had a one-point win over Limerick courtesy of a last-minute free by Michael 'Babs' Keating. Tipp later played Kilkenny in the first All-Ireland final to be broadcast in colour by Raidió Teilifís Éireann. In a high-scoring game and in spite of Eddie Keher scoring a record 2-11, Tipp won on a score line of 5-17 to 5-14. Ryan claimed his sole senior All-Ireland medal that day. He continued as a member of the senior team until 1975.

=== Provincial ===
Ryan also lined out with Munster in the inter-provincial hurling competition. He won Railway Cup titles in 1969 and 1970.

Achievements
Preceded by Gerald McCarthy (Cork)	All-Ireland Under-21 Hurling Final winning captain 1967	Succeeded by Pat Hegarty (Cork)
