= Johnny Ryan (hurler, born 1914) =

Irish hurler

Personal information
- Native name: Seánie Ó Riain (Irish)
- Born: Moycarkey, County Tipperary

Sport
- Sport: Hurling
- Position: Left corner-back
Club
- Years: Club
- 1930s-1940s: Moycarkey–Borris
Club titles
- Tipperary titles: 5
Inter-county
- Years: County
- 1930s-1940s: Tipperary
Inter-county titles
- Munster titles: 3
- All-Irelands: 2 (1 as sub)
- NHL: 0

Johnny Ryan (16 August 1914 – 5 January 1997) was an Irish sportsperson. He played hurling with his local club Moycarkey–Borris and was a member of the Tipperary senior inter-county team in the 1930s and 1940s. Ryan won an All-Ireland winners' medal with Tipp in 1937, as well as three Munster titles in 1937, 1941 and 1945.
