= Jimmy Cooney (Tipperary hurler) =

Irish hurler (1914–1975)

Personal information
- Native name: Séamus Ó Cuana (Irish)
- Born: 27 April 1914 Carrick-on-Suir, County Tipperary, Ireland
- Died: 28 July 1975 (aged 61) Stoneybatter, Dublin, Ireland
- Occupation: Army officer

Sport
- Sport: Hurling
- Position: Midfield
Clubs
- Years: Club
- Carrick Swans; Carrick Davins
Club titles
- Tipperary titles: 0
Inter-county
- Years: County
- 1934–1942: Tipperary
Inter-county titles
- Munster titles: 1
- All-Irelands: 1
- NHL: 0

James J. Cooney (27 April 1914 – 28 July 1975) was an Irish hurler who played as a midfielder at senior level for the Tipperary county team.

Cooney joined the team during the 1934 championship and was a regular member of the starting fifteen until his retirement after the 1942 championship. During that time he won one All-Ireland medal and one Munster medal.

At club level Cooney played with the Carrick Swans and Carrick Davins clubs. He also played football for UCD GAA while an Engineering student at University College Dublin.

== 1938 suspension controversy ==
On 12 February 1938 Cooney was seen attending the Ireland–England rugby international and, for breaching the GAA's ban on foreign games, he was suspended for three months, to end on 14 May 1938. He played in Tipperary after 14 May but was re-suspended on a technicality: the GAA required students to register an inter-county transfer between their winter college county and their summer home county (Dublin and Tipperary respectively in Cooney's case) and, because Cooney's summer 1938 transfer was registered while he was suspended, the GAA deemed it ineffective. While under the second suspension, Cooney played against Clare on 26 June in the Munster Championship semi-final; Clare lost but were awarded the match on appeal.

He transferred from Carrick Davins to UCD in October 1936.
