= Ned Bowe =

Irish hurler, played for County Tipperary

Personal information
- Native name: Éamonn Ó Buaigh (Irish)
- Born: 2 February 1865 Two-Mile-Borris, County Tipperary, Ireland
- Died: 7 April 1937 (aged 72) Two-Mile-Borris, County Tipperary, Ireland
- Occupation: Farmer

Sport
- Sport: Hurling
Club
- Years: Club
- 1880s-1900s: Moycarkey–Borris
Club titles
- Tipperary titles: 0
Inter-county
- Years: County
- 1887: Tipperary
Inter-county titles
- All-Irelands: 1

Edmond Bowe (2 February 1865 – 7 April 1937) was an Irish hurler who played for the Tipperary senior team.

Bowe was a member of the team for just one season during the 1887 championship. It was a successful season, as he secured an All-Ireland medal that year. It was Tipperary's first All-Ireland title.

At club level, Bowe enjoyed a long career with Moycarkey–Borris.
