= 1903 Tipperary Senior Hurling Championship =

Annual hurling competition season

- Champions: Two-Mile Borris (2nd title)
- Runners-up: Lahora De Wets

The 1903 Tipperary Senior Hurling Championship was the 14th staging of the Tipperary Senior Hurling Championship since its establishment by the Tipperary County Board in 1887.

Two-Mile Borris won the championship after a defeat of Lahora De Wets in the final. It was their second championship title overall and their first title since 1900.
