= Matchday programme =

Type of sports programme

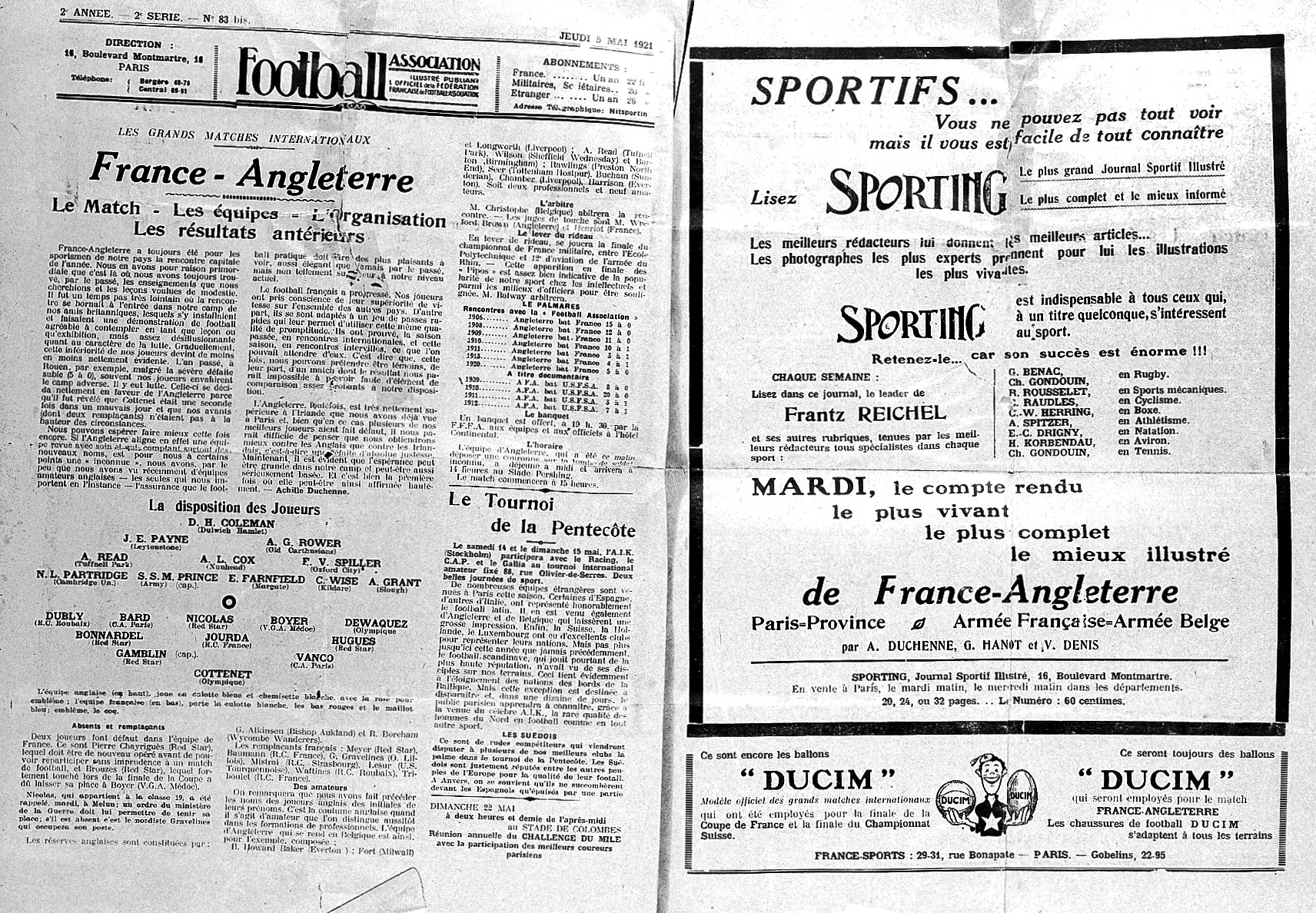
Extract of programme for an exhibition (friendly) game between France and an English amateur team in Vincennes, France in May 1921

A matchday programme or match programme is a booklet associated with a live sporting event which details the proposed starting lineup and other details of the match. To some spectators, the purchase of a matchday programme is part of the "ritual" of attending football and hurling matches in Britain and Ireland. Until 2018, the printing of matchday programmes was compulsory for English Football League games.

Souvenir programmes are also collected as sports memorabilia, and rare FA Cup Final matchday programmes have fetched in excess of £35,000 at auction houses such as Sotheby's. Matchday programmes from early 20th-century hurling and Gaelic football games are also collected in Ireland, and a programme from the 1913 All-Ireland Senior Hurling Championship Final was sold at auction in 2018 for more than €2,000.

== Association football ==
Among the traditions in attending a league or cup football match in Britain is the purchase of a matchday programme. Due to their initial expendable nature (like the ticket) it took many decades for the format to gain respectability as a collectible. Collecting football programmes became a common hobby among fans in Britain during the 1960s and a number of specialist dealers subsequently began to appear.

=== History ===
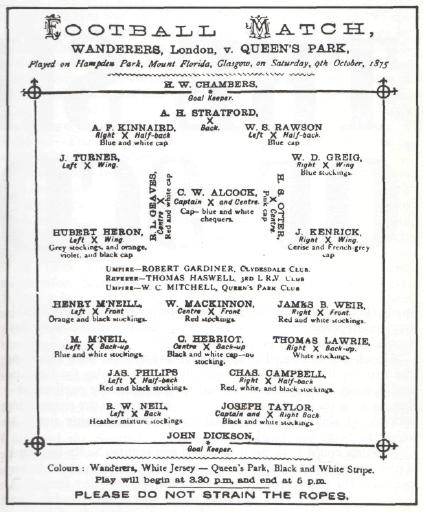
Programme for an association football match played at Hampden Park, Glasgow on 9 October 1875 between home side Queen's Park and the Wanderers from London. It mentions the visiting club first and identifies individual players not by jersey numbers but by the colours of their stockings or caps.

One of the earliest matchday programmes recorded, for an 1873 football match between alumni representatives of Eton College (in England) and Yale College (in the US), was reputedly sold in 2016 for £15,000.

In English league football, matchday programmes were used from the late 1880s as a scorecard which would have been a single card or sheet with dateline, team names, player positions and advertising. West Midlands team Aston Villa were one of the first clubs to publish a programme, The Villa News and Record, which was printed in the form of a journal with a different number and volume for each season and week respectively.

Of particular interest for UK collectors is the FA Cup Final programme. The covers of FA Cup Final matchday programmes have had designs which reflected the age, with the late 1920s and 1930s covers bearing Art Deco styles, for example. Programmes from the 1940s and early 1950s are rarer due to recycling for paper shortages as part of the war effort and times of post-war austerity. The size of the programmes increased over the decades from a smaller pocket size to a larger A4 size, but a number of clubs in the early 21st century have reverted to more convenient sizes. The FA Cup Final programme has, however, retained its larger size (customarily being sold with a carrier bag for this reason).

While, until the 1950s, programmes produced by individual clubs were typically limited to team sheets and advertising, some clubs started to introduce "more sophisticated" magazine formats. Modern programmes have more pages than their four or eight-page predecessors and are often full colour and glossy.

In June 2018, clubs in the English Football League voted to end the requirement for programmes to be produced for every game. A decline in sales was attributed to the proliferation of smartphones which allowed fans to access team information easily.

=== Notable programmes and collecting ===
Some clubs have a programme shop for collectors.

One of the most sought-after of all programmes is the 1966 FIFA World Cup Final. There have been at least two reprints — with the original being heavier than the reprints at 130 grams — and the inside advert for Player's No. 6 is different. The blue of the Union Flag on the cover is darker too.

The programme for the first ever FA Cup Final held in Wembley in 1923 is rarer than the 1966 programme, and would typically cost over £1000. The programme for the 1924 FA Cup Final is also rare; the game was played in torrential rain and fans used their programmes as part of their effort to cover themselves against the weather. An example, offered at auction in 2017, was estimated at between £3,500 and £4,500.

Following the Munich air disaster in February 1958, Manchester United's planned game against Wolverhampton Wanderers was cancelled and a majority of programmes that had been printed were destroyed. One of the rare surviving examples of this matchday programme was sold in 2024 for £7,500. Another notable Manchester United programme is the example printed in February 1958 for the FA Cup game between Manchester United and Sheffield Wednesday. This was the club's first game after the Munich air disaster and the team layout was left blank.

A football programme from the 1882 FA Cup Final between Blackburn Rovers and Old Etonians sold at auction for a world record of £35,250. The programme was sold by Sotheby's in May 2013 to Old Etonians Football Club. The previous record for a football programme was for the 1909 FA Cup Final contested between Manchester United and Bristol City. It was sold in a 2012 auction for £23,500.

The programme for the 1973 European Cup Final between Ajax and Juventus is also rare, with only 400 produced.

== Gaelic football ==
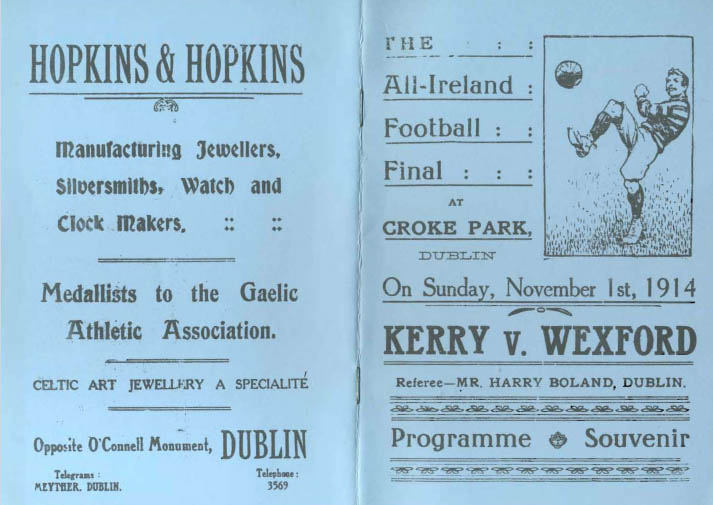
A programme for the 1914 All-Ireland Football Final, listing Harry Boland as match referee, was sold in a 2011 auction for €1,500

The Gaelic Athletic Association (GAA) produces a matchday programme for every game in the All-Ireland Senior Football Championship. Photographs, prints and posters of past programmes are available to buy from the Croke Park shop. The official matchday programme for the 2020 All-Ireland Senior Football Championship Final (held behind closed doors due to the COVID-19 pandemic) was made available in physical form for supporters ahead of the game, either online (via an emailed PDF and follow-up copy send through the postal system) or to purchase at SuperValu and Centra outlets in the competing counties.

Home teams produce matchday programmes for National Football League games.

County boards, such as Kerry GAA, also produce matchday programmes for their own local competitions.

== Hurling ==
As with Gaelic football, the GAA produces matchday programmes for every game in the All-Ireland Senior Hurling Championship, and sells prints and posters of past programmes.

Home teams produce matchday programmes for National Hurling League games.

A matchday programme from the 1913 All-Ireland Senior Hurling Championship Final sold at auction in Kilkenny for more than €2,000 in 2018.

The GAA apologised after forgetting to include Clare in the 2022 All-Ireland Senior Hurling Championship Final matchday programme's "roll of honour section".

== Rugby ==
Matchday programmes for rugby games are also produced and collected. A programme from a Grand Slam decider, contested by Wales and Ireland in the 1911 Five Nations Championship, was sold in 2009 for £2,400.

== See also ==
- Association football culture
