= 1942 Tipperary Senior Hurling Championship =

Annual hurling competition season

- Dates: 20 September – 4 October 1942
- Teams: 4
- Champions: Thurles Sarsfields (13th title); Jimmy Lanigan (captain)
- Runners-up: Killenaule

Tournament statistics
- Matches played: 3
- Goals scored: 19 (6.33 per match)
- Points scored: 16 (5.33 per match)

The 1942 Tipperary Senior Hurling Championship was the 51st staging of the Tipperary Senior Hurling Championship since its establishment by the Tipperary County Board in 1887. The championship ran from 20 September to 4 October 1942.

Boherlahan were the defending champions.

The final was played on 4 October 1942 at Boherlahan Grounds, between Thurles Sarsfields and Killenaule, in what was their first ever meeting in the final. Thurles Sarsfields won the match by 8–05 to 0–01 to claim their 13th championship title overall and a first title in three years.

== Qualification ==
Championship	Champions
Mid Tipperary Senior Hurling Championship	Thurles Sarsfields
North Tipperary Senior Hurling Championship	Roscrea
South Tipperary Senior Hurling Championship	Kilenaule
West Tipperary Senior Hurling Championship	Éire Óg Annacarty

== Results ==
=== Semi-finals ===
20 September 1942 Semi-final	Killenaule	4-02 - 1-03	Éire Óg Annacarty	Leahy Park

20 September 1942 Semi-final	Thurles Sarsfields	4-04 - 2-01	Roscrea	Páirc Shíleáin

=== Final ===
4 October 1942 Final	Thurles Sarsfields	8-05 - 0-01	Killenaule	Boherlahan Grounds
