= 1968 All-Ireland Senior Hurling Championship final =

1968 All-Ireland Senior Hurling Final
- Event: 1968 All-Ireland Senior Hurling Championship
Wexford	Tipperary
5-8	3-12
- Date: 1 September 1968
- Venue: Croke Park, Dublin
- Man of the Match: Mick Roche (refused the prize)
- Referee: J. Dowling (Offaly)
- Attendance: 63,461

The 1968 All-Ireland Senior Hurling Championship Final was the 81st All-Ireland Final and the culmination of the 1968 All-Ireland Senior Hurling Championship, an inter-county hurling tournament for the top teams in Ireland. The match was held at Croke Park, Dublin, on 1 September 1968, between Wexford and Tipperary. The Munster champions lost to their Leinster opponents on a score line of 5-8 to 3-12.

== Match details ==
1968-09-01
15:15 UTC+1

Wexford	5-8 – 3-12	Tipperary
J. Berry (2-2), T. Doran (2-1), P. Lynch (1-3), J. O'Brien (0-2).		J. Doyle (1-5), M. Keating (1-3), S. McLoughlin (1-1), L. Devaney (0-2), M. Burns (0-1).

Croke Park, Dublin
Attendance: 63,461
Referee: J. Dowling (Offaly)

Wexford	Tipperary
