= 1966 Tipperary Senior Hurling Championship =

Annual hurling competition season

- Dates: 11 September – 6 November 1966
- Teams: 8
- Champions: Carrick Davins (1st title); Ritchie Walsh (captain)
- Runners-up: Lorrha

Tournament statistics
- Matches played: 7
- Goals scored: 40 (5.71 per match)
- Points scored: 119 (17 per match)
- Top scorer(s): Mick Roche (2–18)

The 1966 Tipperary Senior Hurling Championship was the 75th staging of the Tipperary Senior Hurling Championship since its establishment by the Tipperary County Board] in 1887. The championship ran from 11 September to 6 November 1966.

Thurles Sarsfields were the defending champions.

The final was played on 6 November 1966 at Thurles Sportsfield, between Carrick Davins and Lorrha, in what was their first ever meeting in the final. Carrick Davins won the match by 2–12 to 1–03 to claim their first ever championship title.

Mick Roche was the championship's top scorer with 2–18.

== Qualification ==
Championship	Champions	Second team
Mid Tipperary Senior Hurling Championship	Holycross–Ballycahill	Moyne–Templetuohy
North Tipperary Senior Hurling Championship	Lorrha	Toomevara
South Tipperary Senior Hurling Championship	Carrick Davins	Killenaule
West Tipperary Senior Hurling Championship	Arravale Rovers	Golden

== Results ==
=== Quarter-finals ===
11 September 1966 Quarter-final	Holycross–Ballycahill	3-17 - 1-08	Killenaule	Leahy Park
	S Mackey 1-6, J Scott 2-0, L Mackey 0-4, R Dwan 0-4, L Ryan 0-1, P Cahill 0-1, J Doyle 0-1.		S Walsh 0-4, J Cooke 0-3, P Cooke 1-0, J Daly 0-1.

11 September 1966 Quarter-final	Carrick Davins	2-14 - 4-01	Moyne–Templetuohy	Leahy Park
	J Ryan 2-3, M Roche 0-5, T Murphy 0-3, J Walsh 0-3.		M Coen 2-0, Dunne 1-1, W O'Grady 1-0.

11 September 1966 Quarter-final	Lorrha	9-05 - 2-08	Golden	Páirc Shíleáin
	J Ryan 4-2, M Kennedy 2-0, N Lane 1-1, L Moran 1-0, JJ Kennedy 1-0, P Hogan 0-2.		J Fogarty 2-4, L Moloney 0-2.

11 September 1966 Quarter-final	Arravale Rovers	2-07 - 3-10	Toomevara	Páirc Shíleáin
	T Moloney 1-4, O'Halloran 1-0, P Dwyer 0-1, Doherty 0-1, C Dwyer 0-1,		T Ryan 0-5, Cummins 1-1, F Ryan 1-0, N Maxwell 1-0, R Ryan 0-2, McGrath 0-1, T Shanahan 0-1.

=== Semi-finals ===
2 October 1966 Semi-final	Toomevara	3-10 - 2-13	Carrick Davins	Thurles Sportsfield
	P McGrath 1-1, T Ryan 0-4, S O'Gara 1-0, F Ryan 1-0, R Ryan 0-2, T Shanahan 0-2, P Shanahan 0-1.		J Walsh 1-1, M Roche 0-4, C Broderick 0-4, R Walsh 1-0, PJ Ryan 0-3, T Ryan 0-1.

2 October 1966 Semi-final	Lorrha	5-06 - 4-10 (void)	Holycross–Ballycahill	Thurles Sportsfield

16 October 1966 Semi-final replay	Toomevara	1-07 - 5-06	Carrick Davins	Thurles Sportsfield
	T Ryan 1-4, R Ryan 0-2, P Shanahan 0-1.		M Roche 1-4, J Ryan 2-0, R Walsh 1-0, M Hassett 1-0, PJ Ryan 0-1, J Roche 0-1.

=== Final ===
6 November 1966 Final	Carrick Davins	2-12 - 1-03	Lorrha	Thurles Sportsfield
	M Roche 1-5, R Walsh 1-1, T Ryan 0-2, C Broderick 0-2, J Walsh 0-1, J Ryan 0-1.		M Doyle 1-0, J Ryan 0-1, J Lane 0-1, P Hogan 0-1.

== Championship statistics ==
=== Top scorers ===
Rank	Player	Club	Tally	Total	Matches	Average
1	Mick Roche	Carrick Davins	2-18	24	4	6.00
2	Jimmy Ryan	Carrick Davins	4-04	16	4	4.00
2	Tom Ryan	Toomevara	1-13	16	3	5.33
4	Jim Ryan	Lorrha	4-03	15	2	7.50
5	Ritchie Walsh	Carrick Davins	3-01	10	4	2.50
5	Joe Fogarty	Golden	2-04	10	1	10.00

=== Miscellaneous ===
- Lorrha initially lost the semi-final to Holycross–Ballycahill, however, following the match, Lorrha officially objected to Holycross, claiming they fielded an illegal player. The Tipperary County Board threw out the objection, but Lorrha appealed the decision to the Munster Council. Lorrha's appeal was upheld and they were awarded the match.
