= 1925 All-Ireland Senior Hurling Championship final =

1925 All-Ireland Senior Hurling Final
- Event: 1925 All-Ireland Senior Hurling Championship
Tipperary	Galway
5-6	1-5
- Date: 6 September 1925
- Venue: Croke Park, Dublin
- Referee: P. McCullagh (Wexford)
- Attendance: 20,000

The 1925 All-Ireland Senior Hurling Championship Final was the 38th All-Ireland Final and the culmination of the 1925 All-Ireland Senior Hurling Championship, an inter-county hurling tournament for the top teams in Ireland. The match was held at Croke Park, Dublin, on 6 September 1925, between Galway and Tipperary. The Connacht men lost to the Munster champions on a score line of 5–6 to 1–5.

== Match details ==
1925-09-06
Final

Tipperary	5-6 – 1-5	Galway

Croke Park, Dublin
Attendance: 20,000
Referee: P. McCullagh (Wexford)

Tipperary	Galway
