= 1936 Tipperary Senior Hurling Championship =

Annual hurling competition season

- Dates: 27 September – 25 October 1936
- Teams: 4
- Champions: Thurles Sarsfields (10th title); Jimmy Lanigan (captain)
- Runners-up: Roscrea; Thomas Hannon (captain)

Tournament statistics
- Matches played: 3
- Goals scored: 13 (4.33 per match)
- Points scored: 16 (5.33 per match)

The 1936 Tipperary Senior Hurling Championship was the 45th staging of the Tipperary Senior Hurling Championship since its establishment by the Tipperary County Board in 1887. The championship ran from 27 September to 25 October 1936

Thurles Sarsfields were the defending champions.

The final was played on 25 October 1936 at St Cronan's Park in Roscrea, between Thurles Sarsfields and first-time finalists Roscrea. Thurles Sarsfields won the match by 2–01 to 0–03 to claim their 10th championship title overall and a second consecutive title.

== Qualification ==
Championship	Champions
Mid Tipperary Senior Hurling Championship	Thurles Sarsfields
North Tipperary Senior Hurling Championship	Roscrea
South Tipperary Senior Hurling Championship	Carrick Swans
West Tipperary Senior Hurling Championship	Cashel King Cormacs

== Results ==
=== Semi-finals ===
27 September 1936 Semi-final	Thurles Sarsfields	3-04 - 1-02	Cashel King Cormacs	Borrisoleigh Grounds

11 October 1936 Semi-final	Roscrea	6-01 - 1-05	Carrick Swans	Thurles Sportsfield

=== Final ===
25 October 1936 Final	Thurles Sarsfields	2-01 - 0-03	Roscrea	St Cronan's Park
