= 1913 All-Ireland Senior Hurling Championship final =

1913 All-Ireland Senior Hurling Final
- Event: 1913 All-Ireland Senior Hurling Championship
Kilkenny	Tipperary
2–4	1–2
- Date: 2 November 1913
- Venue: Croke Park, Dublin
- Referee: M. F. Crowe (Limerick)
- Attendance: 12,000

The 1913 All-Ireland Senior Hurling Championship Final was the 26th All-Ireland Final and the culmination of the 1913 All-Ireland Senior Hurling Championship, an inter-county hurling tournament for the top teams in Ireland. The match was held at Croke Park, Dublin, on 2 November 1913, between Kilkenny, represented by a club side from Mooncoin, and Tipperary, represented by club side Toomevara. The Munster champions lost to their Leinster opponents on a score line of 2–4 to 1–2.

== Match ==
=== Summary ===
J. Murphy opened the scoring with a goal for Tipperary and Matt Gargan replied with a Kilkenny goal. Kilkenny's vital second goal was scored by Sim Walton.

It was Kilkenny's third All-Ireland title in-a-row and a remarkable seventh All-Ireland title in ten championship seasons. It was also the first all-Ireland final in which teams of 15 took part.

A matchday programme from the game sold at auction in Kilkenny for more than €2,000 in 2018.

=== Details ===
1913-11-02

Kilkenny	2–4 – 1–2	Tipperary

Croke Park, Dublin
Attendance: 12,000
Referee: M. F. Crowe (Limerick)
