= 1937 All-Ireland Senior Hurling Championship =

Championship details
- Dates: 16 May – 5 September 1937
- Teams: 14

All-Ireland champions
- Winning team: Tipperary (12th win)
- Captain: Jimmy Lanigan

All-Ireland Finalists
- Losing team: Kilkenny
- Captain: Jack Duggan

Provincial champions
- Munster: Tipperary
- Leinster: Kilkenny
- Ulster: Not Played
- Connacht: Not Played

Championship statistics
- No. matches played: 13
- Goals total: 94 (7.2 per game)
- Points total: 112 (8.6 per game))
- Top Scorer: Paddy McMahon (6–0)
- All-Star Team: See here

The 1937 All-Ireland Senior Hurling Championship was the 51st staging of the All-Ireland hurling championship since its establishment by the Gaelic Athletic Association in 1887. The championship began on 16 May 1937 and ended on 5 September 1937.

Limerick entered the championship as defending champions, however, they were defeated in the provincial stages. Tipperary won the title following a 3–11 to 0–3 victory over Kilkenny in the final.

== Format ==
The All-Ireland Senior Hurling Championship was run on a provincial basis as usual. All games were played on a knockout basis whereby once a team lost they were eliminated from the championship. The format for the All-Ireland series of games ran as follows:

- The winners of the Munster Championship advanced directly to the All-Ireland final.
- The winners of the Leinster Championship advanced directly to a lone All-Ireland semi-final.
- Galway, a team who faced no competition in the Connacht Championship, entered the championship at the All-Ireland semi-final stage where they played the Leinster champions.
- There were no representatives from the Ulster Championship in the All-Ireland series.

== Results ==
=== Leinster Senior Hurling Championship ===
16 May 1937 First round	Westmeath	4–2 – 1–7	Meath	Cusack Park

23 May 1937 First round	Wexford	2–8 – 6–2	Offaly	Nowlan Park

6 June 1937 Quarter-final	Westmeath	5–3 – 2–3	Offaly	Cusack Park

20 June 1937 Semi-final	Westmeath	7–7 – 5–3	Laois	Cusack Park

27 June 1937 Semi-final	Kilkenny	5–5 – 3–4	Dublin	O'Connor Park

18 July 1937 Final	Kilkenny	5–3 – 2–4	Westmeath	O'Moore Park
	M White 3–1, L Duggan 2–0, J Phelan 0–1, L Meagher 0–1.		C Boland 2–0, S Skehal 0–1, E Moynihan 0–1, T McGrath 0–1, T Morgan 0–1.

=== Munster Senior Hurling Championship ===
First round

9 May 1937 First round	Kerry	3–02 – 9–05	Waterford	Austin Stack Park, Tralee
			Greene 3–2, D Goode 3–1, W Barron 1–0, Halloran 1–0.	Referee: W Hough (Limerick)

23 May 1937 First round	Limerick	5–05 – 4–01	Clare	Gaelic Grounds, Limerick
	P McMahon 4–0, D Clohessy 1–1, J Hickey 0–1, D Given 0–2, T Ryan 0–1.		M Hennessy 1–1, P Loughnane 1–0, R Burns 1–0, M Halloran 1–0.

Semi-finals

6 June 1937 Semi-final	Tipperary	4–03 – 3–05	Cork	Thurles Sportsfield, Thurles
	D Murphy 2–0, J Coffey 1–1, P Ryan 1–1, J Cooney 0–1.		T Kelly 1–0, J Barrett 1–0, P Reid 1–0, J Lynch 0–2, F Barry 0–2, D Cogan 0–1.	Referee: W Gleeson (Limerick)

4 July 1937 Semi-final	Limerick	3–04 – 3–02	Waterford	Ned Hall Park, Clonmel
	D Clohessy 2–1, J McCarthy 1–0, J Mackey 0–1, M Mackey 0–1, J Roche 0–1,		D Goode 1–0, Butler 1–0, C Moylan 1–0, J Keane 0–1, T Greaney 0–1.	Referee: J O'Keeffe (Tipperary)

Final

25 July 1937 Final	Tipperary	6–03 – 4–03	Limerick	Cork Athletic Grounds, Cork
	P Ryan 2–1, T Doyle 1–1, T Treacy 1–0, AN Other 1–0, J Coffey 1–0, B O'Donnell 0–1.		D Clohessy 2–0, M Mackey 1–1, P McMahon 1–0, T Ryan 0–1, J Mackey 0–1,	Attendance: 30,235

=== All-Ireland Senior Hurling Championship ===
8 August 1937 Semi-final	Kilkenny	0–8 – 0–6	Galway	St. Brendan's Park

5 September 1937 Final	Tipperary	3–11 – 0–3	Kilkenny	FitzGerald Stadium
				Attendance: 43,638; Referee: J Flaherty (Offaly)

== Championship statistics ==
=== Miscellaneous ===
- Westmeath arguably enjoy their best ever season of championship hurling. Three successive victories allowed them to qualify for their first, and to date their only, Leinster decider.
- That All-Ireland final was the first to be played outside of Croke Park and, indeed, Dublin for thirty years. A builders' strike delayed the construction of the Cusack Stand in Croke Park meaning an alternative venue had to be found and the new FitzGerald Stadium in Killarney was chosen.

== Sources ==
- Corry, Eoghan, The GAA Book of Lists (Hodder Headline Ireland, 2005).
- Donegan, Des, The Complete Handbook of Gaelic Games (DBA Publications Limited, 2005).
