= 1926 Tipperary Senior Hurling Championship =

Annual hurling competition season

- Champions: Moycarkey-Borris (5th title)
- Runners-up: Boherlahan

The 1926 Tipperary Senior Hurling Championship was the 35th staging of the Tipperary Senior Hurling Championship since its establishment by the Tipperary County Board in 1887.

Moycarkey-Borris won the championship after a 6–04 to 4–02 win over Boherlahen in the final. It was the club's first title as Moycarkey-Borris but the fifth title to be claimed by a team representing the area.

== Results ==
=== Final ===
29 May 1927 Final	Moycarkey-Borris	6-04 - 4-02	Boherlahan	Thurles Sportsfield
