= 1900 Tipperary Senior Hurling Championship =

Annual hurling competition season

- Champions: Two-Mile Borris (1st title)
- Runners-up: Moycarkey

The 1900 Tipperary Senior Hurling Championship was the 11th staging of the Tipperary Senior Hurling Championship since its establishment by the Tipperary County Board in 1887.

Two-Mile Borris won the championship after receiving a walkover from Moycarkey in the final. It was the club's first championship title.
