= 1932 Tipperary Senior Hurling Championship =

Annual hurling competition season

- Teams: 4
- Champions: Moycarkey-Borris (6th title); Phil Purcell (captain)
- Runners-up: Killenaule; Michael Kennedy (captain)

Tournament statistics
- Matches played: 3
- Goals scored: 25 (8.33 per match)
- Points scored: 19 (6.33 per match)

The 1932 Tipperary Senior Hurling Championship was the 41st staging of the Tipperary Senior Hurling Championship since its establishment by the Tipperary County Board in 1887.

Moycarkey-Borris won the championship after a 7–06 to 5–01 win over Killenaule in the final. It was the club's second title as Moycarkey-Borris but the sixth title to be claimed by a team representing the area.

== Qualification ==
Championship	Champions
Mid Tipperary Senior Hurling Championship	Moycarkey–Borris
North Tipperary Senior Hurling Championship	Toomevara
South Tipperary Senior Hurling Championship	Kilenaule
West Tipperary Senior Hurling Championship	Clonoulty

== Results ==
=== Semi-finals ===
10 July 1932 Semi-final	Moycarkey–Borris	4-09 - 1-02	Toomevara	St Cronan's Park

24 July 1932 Semi-final	Killenaule	7-01 - 1-00	Clonoulty	Cashel Sportsfield

=== Final ===
11 September 1932 Final	Moycarkey–Borris	7-06 - 5-01	Killenaule	Thurles Sportsfield
