= Mick Roche =

Irish hurler

Personal information
- Native name: Mícheál de Róiste (Irish)
- Born: 8 October 1943 Carrickbeg, County Tipperary, Ireland
- Died: 7 December 2016 (aged 73) Horse and Jockey, County Tipperary, Ireland
- Occupation: Company representative
- Height: 5 ft 11 in (180 cm)

Sport
- Sport: Hurling
- Position: Centre-back
Clubs
- Years: Club
- St. Molleran's; Carrick Davins
Club titles
- Tipperary titles: 2
- Munster titles: 1
Inter-county*
Years	County	Apps (scores)
1963–1974	Tipperary	27 (1–17)
Inter-county titles
- Munster titles: 5
- All-Irelands: 3
- NHL: 3
- All Stars: 1
- *Inter County team apps and scores correct as of 19:50. 6 September 2014.

Michael Roche (8 October 1943 – 7 December 2016) was an Irish hurler whose league and championship career with the Tipperary senior team spanned twelve seasons from 1963 to 1974. He is regarded as one of the greatest centre-backs of all time, in spite of spending much of playing career in his favoured position of midfield.

Born near Carrickbeg, County Tipperary, Roche was raised in a household that had a strong association with Gaelic games. His father was a founder-member of the Carrick Davins club and had played Gaelic football for Tipperary. He first came to prominence as a hurler as a member of the St. Molleran's minor team that won the county minor championship title with 1959. Roche subsequently joined the Carrick Davins club and went on to win one Munster medal and two county senior championship medals.

After failing to secure a place on the Waterford minor team in 1960, Roche made his debut on the inter-county scene at the age of seventeen when he was selected on the Tipperary minor team in 1961. He won a Munster medal that year but was later denied an All-Ireland medal in what was his last game in the minor grade. A successful year with the Tipperary intermediate hurlers culminated in the winning of an All-Ireland medal in 1963, before claiming an All-Ireland medal with the under-21 team in 1964. By this stage he had also joined the Tipperary senior panel, first lining out during the 1963 championship. Over the course of the next twelve seasons, Roche won three All-Ireland medals, beginning with back-to-back triumphs in 1964 and 1965, and ending with a final title in 1971. He was an All-Ireland runner-up as captain in 1967 and 1968. Roche also won five Munster medals and three National Hurling League medals. He played his last game for Tipperary in July 1974.

After being chosen at midfield on the Munster inter-provincial team in 1965, Roche was an automatic choice on the starting fifteen for much of his playing career. He won a total of three Railway Cup medals.

Roche is widely regarded as one of the great centre-backs of his era and as one of the greatest Tipperary players of all time. During his career he was honoured with three Cú Chulainn awards, while he was also chosen on the inaugural All-Star team. In 2000 Roche was named at midfield on the Tipperary Team of the Century, while he was later chosen as one of the 125 greatest hurlers of all-time in a 2009 poll.

== Playing career ==
=== Minor, under-21 and intermediate ===
By 1960 Roche's performances as a minor hurler for St. Molleran's led to him being considered for the Waterford minor hurling panel. He was only sixteen years-old when he was called for a trial, however, he failed to be selected.

Roche was eligible for the minor grade again the following year, however, on this occasion he was added to the Tipperary panel after impressing in trial games. He made his debut against Clare on 2 July 1961. Roche later won a Munster medal following a 7-11 to 1-6 thrashing of Cork. The subsequent All-Ireland final on 3 September 1961 saw Roche make his first Croke Park appearance. Kilkenny provided the opposition on that occasion, however, Tipperary looked set for victory when they held a 0-12 to 1-7 lead with ten minutes remaining in the games. Kilkenny scored 2-6 in the time remaining and, in spite of Billy Ryan scoring 0-12 of Tipperary's points, Roche's side faced a 3-13 to 0-15 defeat.

In 1963 Roche went on to become one of the youngest members of the Tipperary intermediate hurling team. He was at midfield from the start of the championship campaign and collected a Munster medal following a 6-10 to 0-4 trouncing of Clare. The subsequent All-Ireland final on 8 September 1963 saw Tipperary face London. Tipperary had home advantage at Thurles Sportsfield and secured a 1-10 to 1-7 victory after a poor game. Roche contributed three points from midfield and collected an All-Ireland Intermediate Hurling Championship medal.

Roche was added to the inaugural Tipperary under-21 team in 1964. The team dominated the new provincial series and collected the Munster title following an 8-9 to 3-1 defeat of Waterford in the decider. The All-Ireland final on 4 October 1964 saw Tipperary face Wexford. Tipperary's forwards ran riot, with Roche contributing to the eight-goal scoreline. An 8-9 to 3-1 victory gave him an All-Ireland medal in the new grade.

=== Senior ===
Roche was added to the Tipperary senior panel in 1963, however, his involvement with the intermediate team precluded him from making his championship debut. Later that year he won an Oireachtas Cup medal at midfield as Tipperary defeated Wexford by 4-15 to 3-12.

Throughout the 1963-64 league campaign Roche became a regular member of the senior team. The campaign was a successful one, with Roche winning a first National Hurling League medal following a 4-16 to 6-6 defeat of New York in the decider. Tipperary later cantered casually past Cork by fourteen points in the provincial decider, giving Roche a first Munster medal. The All-Ireland final on 6 September 1964 saw Kilkenny enter the game as firm favourites against Tipperary. John "Mackey" McKenna scored Tipperary's first goal after ten minutes as the Munster champions took a 1-8 to 0-6 interval lead. The second half saw Tipperary score goals for fun, with Donie Nealon getting a hat-trick and Seán McLoughlin another. Kilkenny were humiliated at the full-time whistle as Tipperary triumphed by 5-13 to 2-8. It was Roche's first All-Ireland medal. He later added a second Oireachtas Cup medal to his collection before winning a Cú Chulainn Award for his displays throughout the year.

In 1965 Tipperary demolished all opposition in the provincial championship once again. A 4–11 to 0–5 trouncing of Cork gave Roche a second Munster medal. Wexford were Tipperary's opponents in the subsequent All-Ireland final on 5 September 1965, however, the game failed to live up to the two classic games between the two sides in 1960 and 1962. Victory went to Tipperary on that occasion by 2–16 to 0–10, courtesy of a brace of goals by Seán McLoughlin. The win gave Roche a second successive All-Ireland medal. The year ended with further success as he won a second National League medal as New York were narrowly defeated on an aggregate score of 6–19 to 5–20 before claiming a third Oireachtas medal as Kilkenny were downed by 2-12 to 2-7. Roche's performances throughout the year also earned him a second successive Cú Chulainn Award.

After surrendering their provincial crown in 1966, Tipperary bounced back the following year, with Roche, who was now captain of the team, winning a third Munster medal following a 4–12 to 2–6 defeat of Clare. On 3 September 1967 Kilkenny faced Tipperary in the All-Ireland decider. Tipperary looked like continuing their hoodoo over their near rivals as they took a 2–6 to 1–3 lead at half-time. Goalkeeper Ollie Walsh was the hero for Kilkenny as he made a series of spectacular saves, however, the team lost Eddie Keher and Tom Walsh to injury in the second half. In spite of this, Kilkenny laid to rest a bogey that Tipperary had over the team since 1922, and a 3–8 to 2–7 victory resulted in defeat for Roche's team. Roche finished the year by winning a third Cú Chulainn Award.

Roche won a third National League medal in 1968 as New York were defeated on an aggregate score of 6–27 to 4–22. Tipperary retained their status as provincial kingpins once again and a 2–13 to 1–7 trouncing of Cork gave team captain Roche a fourth Munster medal. For the fourth time of the decade, Wexford were Tipperary's opponents in the subsequent All-Ireland final on 1 September 1968. At half-time it looked as if Tipperary were cruising to another victory as they took an eight-point lead. Just after the restart Wexford had a Christy Jacob goal disallowed before Tony Doran scored a goal after just six minutes. Tipperary fought back, however, it was too late as Wexford won by 5–8 to 3–12. In spite of this setback, Roche finished the year with a fourth Oireachtas Cup medal following a narrow 1-9 to 1-6 defeat of Cork.

In 1970 Roche won a fifth Oireachtas Cup medal following a 1-12 to 0-8 defeat of recently crowned All-Ireland champions Cork in the final.

By 1971 the great Tipperary team of the previous decade was in decline and beginning to break up. In spite of this Roche won a fifth Munster medal that year following a 4–16 to 3–18 defeat of Limerick. On 5 September 1971 Kilkenny faced Tipperary in the All-Ireland final, the first to be broadcast in colour by Telefís Éireann and the only eighty-minute meeting between the two sides. Kilkenny's ever-dependable goalkeeper, Ollie Walsh, had a nightmare of a game in which he conceded five goals, one of which passed through his legs, while that year's Hurler of the Year, "Babs" Keating, played out the closing stages of the game in his bare feet. Tipperary emerged the victors on a score line of 5–17 to 5–14. It was Roche's third All-Ireland medal. He finished the year by being included on the inaugural All Stars team.

== Honours ==
=== Player ===
Carrick Davins

- Munster Senior Club Hurling Championship (1): 1966
- Tipperary Senior Hurling Championship (2): 1966, 1967

Tipperary

- All-Ireland Senior Hurling Championship (3): 1964, 1965, 1971
- Munster Senior Hurling Championship (5): 1964, 1965, 1967 (c), 1968 (c), 1971
- National Hurling League (3): 1963-64, 1964-65, 1967-68 (c)
- All-Ireland Under-21 Hurling Championship (1): 1964
- Munster Under-21 Hurling Championship (1): 1964
- All-Ireland Intermediate Hurling Championship (1): 1963
- Munster Intermediate Hurling Championship (1): 1963
- Munster Minor Hurling Championship (1): 1961

Munster

- Railway Cup (3): 1966, 1968 (c), 1970

=== Individual ===
Awards

- GAA All Stars Awards (1): 1971
- Cú Chulainn Awards (3): 1964, 1965, 1967
- All-Ireland Senior Hurling Championship Final Man of the Match (1): 1968
- Tipperary Hurling Team of the Century (2000): Selected at Midfield
- Munster Hall of Fame Inductee: 2010

Sporting positions
Preceded by	Tipperary Senior Hurling Captain; 1967-1968	Succeeded by Francis Loughnane
