= John Joe Callanan =

Tipperary and Dublin hurler

Personal information
- Native name: Seán Seosamh Ó Callanáin (Irish)
- Born: 10 March 1894 Thurles, County Tipperary, Ireland
- Died: 19 December 1970 (aged 76) Thurles, County Tipperary, Ireland

Sport
- Sport: Hurling
- Position: Centre-forward
Clubs
- Years: Club
- Thurles Sarsfields; Collegians
Club titles
- Tipperary titles: 1
Inter-county
- Years: County
- 1918–1919 1920–1921 1926–1930: Tipperary; Dublin; Tipperary
Inter-county titles
- Munster titles: 1
- Leinster titles: 2
- All-Irelands: 2
- NHL: 0

John Joseph Callanan (10 March 1894 – 19 December 1970) was an Irish hurler who played as a centre-forward for the Tipperary and Dublin senior teams.

Born in Thurles, County Tipperary, Callanan first arrived on the inter-county scene at the age of twenty-four when he first linked up with the Tipperary senior team. He joined the senior panel during the 1918 championship and was a regular member of the Tipperary and Dublin teams at various times for over a decade. During that time he won two All-Ireland medals, two Leinster medals and one Munster medal. The All-Ireland-winning captain in 1930, Callanan was an All-Ireland runner-up on one occasion.

As a member of the Munster inter-provincial Callanan won one Railway Cup medal. At club level he was a one-time championship medallist with Thurles Sarsfields while he also played with Collegians.

Callanan retired from inter-county hurling following the conclusion of the 1930 championship.

== Playing career ==
=== Club ===
Callanan began his club hurling career with Thurles Sarsfields before later transferring to Collegians in Dublin. He enjoyed little initial success, with his only major victory coming in the twilight of his career after moving back to Thurles Sarsfields. In 1929 Sarsfields qualified for the championship decider. A 4-3 to 1-3 defeat of Toomevara secured a first title in eighteen years and gave Callanan a Tipperary Senior Hurling Championship medal.

=== Inter-county ===
Callanan joined the Tipperary senior team during the 1918 championship. After two unsuccessful years he later transferred to Dublin.

In 1920 Callanan was a regular member of the starting fifteen with Dublin and won his first Leinster medal following a 4-5 to 2-2 defeat of Kilkenny. The War of Independence hampered the organisation of the championship with the All-Ireland decider not being played until 14 May 1922. Reigning champions Cork provided the opposition, however, Dublin won with a four-goal blitz from Joe Phelan. The 4-9 to 4-3 victory gave Callanan an All-Ireland medal.

Callanan added a second Leinster medal to his collection in 1921 as Dublin accounted for Kilkenny by 4-4 to 1-5. On 4 March 1923 Dublin faced Limerick in the All-Ireland final. Four goals by Limerick captain Bob McConkey helped the Shannonsiders to an 8-5 to 3-2 victory as the Liam MacCarthy Cup was presented for the very first time.

By 1926 Callanan had rejoined the Tipperary senior team, however, Cork dominated the championship. In 1930 he was captain of the team as Cork's bid for a record-equaling fifth successive provincial title faltered. Tipperary bested Clare in the decider by 6-4 to 2-8, giving Callanan a Munster medal. On 7 September 1930 Tipperary faced Callanan's former side Dublin in the All-Ireland decider. Goals at the end of the first half from Martin Kennedy and Callanan gave Tipperary the edge. An eventual 2-7 to 1-3 victory gave Callanan a second All-Ireland medal, while he also had the honour of lifting the Liam MacCarthy Cup.

=== Inter-provincial ===
Callanan was chosen for the Munster inter-provincial team in 1928. He won his sole Railway Cup medal that year following Munster's defeat of arch rivals Leinster in the decider.

== Honours ==
Thurles Sarsfields

- Tipperary Senior Hurling Championship (1): 1929

Dublin

- All-Ireland Senior Hurling Championship (1): 1920
- Leinster Senior Hurling Championship (2): 1920, 1921

Tipperary

- All-Ireland Senior Hurling Championship (1): 1930 (c)
- Munster Senior Hurling Championship (1): 1930 (c)

Munster

- Railway Cup (1): 1928

Sporting positions
Preceded by Paddy Dwyer	Tipperary Senior Hurling Captain; 1930	Succeeded by Martin Kennedy
Achievements
Preceded by Dinny Barry-Murphy (Cork)	All-Ireland SHC winning captain 1930	Succeeded by Eudie Coughlan (Cork)
