= Carrickbeg =

Village in County Tipperary, Ireland

Carrickbeg An Charraig Bheag
- Village
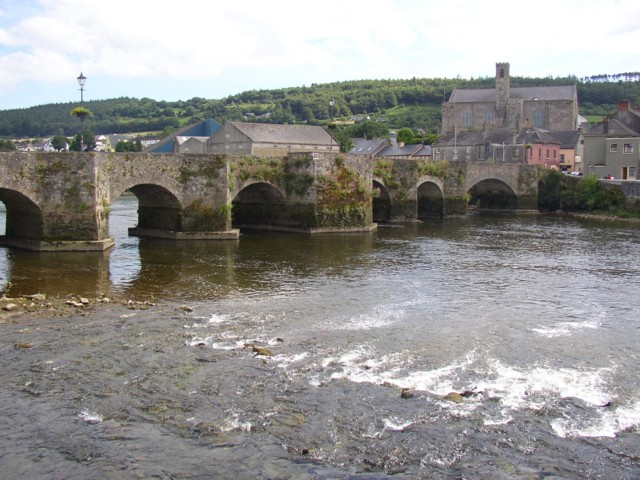
- The Old Bridge with a view of Carrickbeg

- Location in Ireland
- Coordinates: 52°20′39″N 7°24′58″W
- Country: Ireland
- Province: Munster
- County: Tipperary
- Time zone: UTC+0 (WET)
  - Summer (DST): UTC-1 (IST (WEST))

Carrickbeg (Irish: An Charraig Bheag, meaning 'the small rock') is a village in County Tipperary, Ireland. Located on the border with County Waterford, it comprises that part of the town of Carrick-on-Suir lying south of the River Suir. The area is in County Tipperary, but some residents have an affinity for County Waterford, as well as it previously having been a part of that county.

Carrickbeg came to national attention in 2008 when the winning ticket for a €15 million EuroMillions jackpot was sold in the village.

== History ==
The Franciscan order had a presence in Carrickbeg between 1336 and 2006. The land on which the friary was constructed was first granted to the order by the 1st Earl of Ormond. However, the suppression of monasteries by Henry VIII led to the closure of the friary. Just prior to the invasion of Ireland by Oliver Cromwell, the friars had returned for an 11-year period, before being shut down again and the friars having to go underground to avoid persecution. It was not until 1820 and the onset of Catholic Emancipation that the friars were able to fully return and a new chapel was built. Saint Francis Roman Catholic Church was built on the grounds of the former fourteenth-century Franciscan Friary. The friars served the local community until a lack of vocations led to the order finally leaving Carrickbeg in 2006.

== Features ==
The main features of Carrickbeg are the old St. Molleran's church, the River Suir and the views of Slievenamon.

== Sport ==
The local Gaelic Athletic Association club is St. Molleran's. The club is one of three GAA clubs in the town of Carrick-on-Suir, the others being Carrick Davins and Carrick Swan.

The 1998 Tour de France passed through Carrickbeg.

== See also ==
- List of towns and villages in Ireland
