= 1915 All-Ireland Junior Hurling Championship =

All Ireland Champions
- Winners: Tipperary (2nd win)
- Captain: Tom Dwan

All Ireland Runners-up
- Runners-up: Offaly

Provincial Champions
- Munster: Tipperary
- Leinster: Offaly
- Ulster: Not Played
- Connacht: Not Played

The 1915 All-Ireland Junior Hurling Championship was the fourth staging of the All-Ireland Junior Championship since its establishment by the Gaelic Athletic Association in 1912.

Clare entered the championship as the defending champions.

The All-Ireland final was played on 20 August 1916 at Athlone Sportsfield, between Tipperary and Offaly, in what was their first ever championship meeting. Tipperary won the match by 1-06 to 2-02 to claim their second championship title overall and a first title since 1913.

== Results ==
=== All-Ireland Junior Hurling Championship ===
==== All-Ireland semi-finals ====
26 March 1916 Semi-final	Tipperary	11-04 - 0-03	Galway	Markets Field

==== All-Ireland final ====
20 August 1916 Final	Tipperary	1-06 - 2-02	Offaly	Athlone Sportsfield
