= 1925 All-Ireland Senior Hurling Championship =

Championship details
- Dates: 19 April – 6 September 1925
- Teams: 14

All-Ireland champions
- Winning team: Tipperary (10th win)
- Captain: Johnny Leahy

All-Ireland Finalists
- Losing team: Galway
- Captain: Andy Kelly

Provincial champions
- Munster: Tipperary
- Leinster: Kilkenny
- Ulster: Antrim
- Connacht: Not Played

Championship statistics
- No. matches played: 13
- All-Star Team: See here

The All-Ireland Senior Hurling Championship 1925 was the 39th series of the All-Ireland Senior Hurling Championship, Ireland's premier hurling knock-out competition. Tipperary won the championship, beating Galway 5–6 to 1–5 in the final.

== Format ==
All-Ireland Championship

Semi-final: (2 matches) The four provincial representatives make up the semi-final pairings. The Munster and Leinster champions will be on opposite sides of the draw. Two teams are eliminated at this stage, while the two winning teams advance to the final.

Final: (1 match) The winners of the two semi-finals contest this game with the winners being declared All-Ireland champions.

== Results ==
=== Leinster Senior Hurling Championship ===
19 April 1925 Semi-final	Laois	1–2 – 1–3	Kilkenny	Tullamore Sportsfield

10 May 1925 Semi-final	Dublin	4–7 – 0–00	Offaly	Kilkenny Sportsfield

21 June 1925 Final	Dublin	6–4 – 4–7	Kilkenny	Croke Park

=== Munster Senior Hurling Championship ===
10 May 1925 Semi-final	Waterford	5–3 – 0–1	Clare	Waterford Sportsfield

17 May 1925 Quarter-final	Cork	4–9 – 1–3	Limerick	Thurles Sportsfield

31 May 1925 Quarter-final	Tipperary	9–2 – 5–1	Kerry	Markets Field

2 August 1925 Semi-final	Tipperary	5–3 – 5–1	Cork	Markets Field

23 August 1925 Final	Waterford	1–2 – 6–6	Tipperary	Fraher Field

=== Ulster Senior Hurling Championship ===
11 October 1925 Semi-final	Cavan	0–15 – 0–25	Donegal	St. Tiernach's Park

25 October 1925 Final	Antrim	5–4 – 4–5	Donegal	St. Tiernach's Park

=== All-Ireland Senior Hurling Championship ===
26 July 1925 Semi-final	Tipperary	12–9 – 2–3	Antrim	Croke Park

9 August 1925 Semi-final	Galway	9–4 – 6–00	Kilkenny	Croke Park

6 September 1925 Final	Tipperary	5–6 – 1–5	Galway	Croke Park

== Championship statistics ==
=== Miscellaneous ===
- Dublin defeated Kilkenny in the Leinster final, however, a subsequent objection was upheld and the result was overturned. Kilkenny were then declared champions and represented the province in the All-Ireland series.
- Antrim were nominated as the Ulster representatives in the All-Ireland series. It was the last time the Ulster champions progressed to the All-Ireland semi-final until 1943. The Ulster Championship took place after the completion of the All-Ireland series, which Antrim went on to win.

== Sources ==
- Corry, Eoghan, The GAA Book of Lists (Hodder Headline Ireland, 2005).
- Donegan, Des, The Complete Handbook of Gaelic Games (DBA Publications Limited, 2005).
