= 1930 All-Ireland Senior Hurling Championship =

Championship details
- Dates: 18 May – 7 September 1930
- Teams: 12

All-Ireland champions
- Winning team: Tipperary (11th win)
- Captain: John Joe Callinan

All-Ireland Finalists
- Losing team: Dublin
- Captain: Jimmy Walsh

Provincial champions
- Munster: Tipperary
- Leinster: Dublin
- Ulster: Not Played
- Connacht: Not Played

Championship statistics
- No. matches played: 11
- Goals total: 70 (6.3 per game)
- Points total: 91 (8.2 per game)
- Top Scorer: John Joe Callinan (5–1)
- All-Star Team: See here

The 1930 All-Ireland Senior Hurling Championship was the 44th staging of the All-Ireland Senior Hurling Championship, the Gaelic Athletic Association's premier inter-county hurling tournament. The championship began on 18 May 1930 and ended on 7 September 1930.

Cork entered the championship as the defending champions, however, they were defeated by Clare in the Munster semi-final.

On 7 September 1930, Tipperary won the championship following a 5–06 to 3–06 victory over Dublin in the All-Ireland final at Croke Park. This was their 11th championship title overall and their first title since 1925.

== Teams ==
A total of twelve teams contested the championship, the same number of participants from the previous championship. There were no new entrants.

=== Team summaries ===
| Team | Colours | Most recent success | | |
| Team | Colours | All-Ireland | Provincial | League |
|---|---|---|---|---|
| Clare | Saffron and blue | 1914 | 1914 | |
| Cork | Red and white | 1929 | 1929 | 1929–30 |
| Dublin | Blue and navy | 1927 | 1928 | 1928–29 |
| Galway | Maroon and white | 1923 | | |
| Kilkenny | Black and amber | 1922 | 1926 | |
| Laois | Blue and white | 1915 | 1915 | |
| Limerick | Green and white | 1921 | 1923 | |
| Meath | Green and gold | | | |
| Offaly | Green, white and gold | | | |
| Tipperary | Blue and gold | 1925 | 1925 | 1927–28 |
| Waterford | White and blue | | | |
| Wexford | Purple and gold | 1910 | 1918 | |

== Results ==
=== Leinster Senior Hurling Championship ===
First round

| 18 May 1930 First round | Wexford | 3–02 – 5–02 | Laois | Wexford Park, Wexford |

| 18 May 1930 First round | Meath | 4–01 – 3–02 | Offaly | The Showgrounds, Navan |
| | Doran 2–0, Finn 1–0, Martin Doherty 1–0, Mick Doherty 0–1. | | Coughlan 1–0, Dooley 0–1, Grogan 0–1. |

Semi-finals

| 29 June 1930 Semi-final | Laois | 2–04 – 1–05 | Kilkenny | O'Moore Park, Portlaoise |
| | R Delaney 1–0, T Ryan 1–0, P Drennan 0–2, R Warner 0–2. | | E Dunphy 1–0, Brennan 0–2, P Whelan 0–1, P Walsh 0–1, L Meagher 0–1. | Referee: J Hehir (Dublin) |

| 13 July 1030 Semi-final | Meath | 0–01 – 3–05 | Dublin | The Showgrounds, Navan |
| | S Ó Foinn 0–1. | | S Hegarty 1–3, M Power 1–1, T Burke 1–1. | Referee: WP Allen (Drogheda) |

Final

| 3 August 1930 Final | Dublin | 4–07 – 2–02 | Laois | Nowlan Park, Kilkenny |
| | S Hegarty 1–2, Matty Power 1–2, T Burke 1–0, C Griffin 1–0, J Leeson 0–2, T Quinlan 0–1. | | M Lalor 1–0, F Warner 1–0, J Cashin 0–2. |

=== Munster Senior Hurling Championship ===
First round

| 25 May 1930 First round | Waterford | 3–04 – 3–03 | Limerick | Waterford Gaelic Field, Waterford |
| | O'Keeffe 1–1, Fanning 1–0, C Ware 1–0, Power 0–2, Wyse 0–1. | | O'Brien 1–0, Condon 1–0, Breen 1–0, McConnachie 0–1, Gleeson 0–1. | Attendance: 10,000; Referee: P Cahill (Tipperary) |

Semi-finals

| 6 July 1930 Semi-final | Cork | 5–06 – 6–06 | Clare | Ennis Road, Limerick |
| | M Ahern 2–1, P Ahern 2–0, W Clancy 1–1, E Coughlan 0–2, M Hurley 0–2. | | T O'Rourke 2–1, T Burnell 2–0, M O'Rourke 1–0, L Blake 1–0, J Gleeson 0–3, M Falvey 0–1, T Considine 0–1. | Referee: W Walsh (Waterford) |

| 13 July 1930 Semi-final | Waterford | 0–01 – 2–05 | Tipperary | Fraher Field, Dungarvan |
| | | | | Attendance: 8,000; Referee: S Óg Murphy (Cork Co. Board) |

Final

| 27 July 1930 Final | Tipperary | 6–04 – 2–08 | Clare | Cork Athletic Grounds, Cork |
| | T Leahy 3–1, JJ Callanan 2–0, M Kennedy 1–0, P Cahill 0–2, T Treacy 0–1. | | M Falvey 2–2, B Considine 0–2, J Gleeson 0–2, M Connery 0–1, T O'Rourke 0–1. | Attendance: 20,000; Referee: S Óg Murphy (Cork Co. Board) |

=== All-Ireland Senior Hurling Championship ===
Semi-final

| 17 August 1930 Semi-final | Dublin | 6–08 – 2–04 | Galway | St. Brendan's Park, Birr |

Final

| 7 September 1930 Final | Tipperary | 5–06 – 3–06 | Dublin | Croke Park, Dublin |
| | | | | Attendance: 21,730; Referee: S Jordan (Galway) |

== Championship statistics ==
=== Miscellaneous ===
- On 13 July 1930, the Munster semi-final between Tipperary and Waterford ended in disarray after the referee, Seán Óg Murphy, attempted to send off John and Charlie Ware of Waterford and John Joe Callanan of Tipperary. The Waterford players refused to leave and there was a delay of 12 minutes. The referee awarded the match to Tipperary.
- Tipperary become the first team to win the Triple Crown of hurling by winning the All-Ireland titles in the senior, junior and minor grades.

== Sources ==
- Corry, Eoghan, The GAA Book of Lists (Hodder Headline Ireland, 2005).
- Donegan, Des, The Complete Handbook of Gaelic Games (DBA Publications Limited, 2005).
