= Moycarkey–Borris GAA =

Gaelic sports club in County Tipperary, Ireland

Moycarkey–Borris
- Magh Coirce–Buirgheas
- Founded: 1885
- County: Tipperary
- Nickname: Moycarkey
- Colours
- Grounds: Moycarkey–Borris GAA Grounds

Playing kits
Standard colours

Senior Club Championships
	All Ireland	Munster champions	Tipperary champions
Hurling:	0	1	12

Moycarkey–Borris GAA is a Gaelic Athletic Association club in Littleton, County Tipperary, Ireland. The club is affiliated to the Mid Tipperary Board and fields teams in hurling and Gaelic football.

== History ==
Moycarkey–Borris GAA Club was founded on 1 November 1885, as a result of a resolution at an Irish National League meeting which called on the young men of the parish to form a branch of the Gaelic Athletic Association. The club is centred on the village of Littleton, about 5 miles from Thurles, but also encompasses areas such as Moycarkey, Two-Mile Borris and Horse and Jockey. Since the beginning, a number of teams have represented the parish, however, it was decided in 1961 that one singular team should be formed.

The new club was in its infancy when, in 1889, Moycarkey claimed its first Tipperary SHC title. A further three titles were won around the turn of the century by a Two-Mile Borris team. Moycarkey–Borris dominated the Mid Tipperary SHC between 1920 and 1943, with 13 titles being won. The club also won six Tipperary SHC titles during this period, including three successive titles between 1932 and 1934.

After winning their 10th Tipperary SHC title in 1940, a victory which put them second on the all-time toll of honour, it was 1982 before Moycarkey–Borris won their next title. This was followed by the club winning the Munster Club SHC title, following a 1–09 to 0–11 win over Patrickswell in the 1982 Munster Club SHC final. Moycarkey–Borris won their 12th and final Tipperary SHC title two years later in 1984.

== Honours ==
- Munster Senior Club Hurling Championship (12): 1982
- Tipperary Senior Hurling Championship (12): 1889, 1900, 1903, 1905, 1926, 1932, 1933, 1934, 1937, 1940, 1982, 1984
- Tipperary Intermediate Hurling Championship (1): 1985
- Tipperary Intermediate Football Championship (3): 1980, 2012, 2019
- Mid Tipperary Senior Hurling Championship (19): 1910, 1920, 1922, 1923, 1924, 1926, 1930, 1931, 1932, 1933, 1934, 1937, 1940, 1943, 1965, 1967, 1971, 1981, 1982
- Tipperary Junior A Hurling Championship (2): 1954, 2013
- Mid Tipperary Intermediate Hurling Championship (3): 1985, 2005, 2007
- Mid Tipperary Intermediate Football Championship (8): 1979, 1980, 1985, 1986, 1988, 2012, 2017, 2019
- Mid Tipperary Junior A Hurling Championship (14): 1909, 1912, 1918, 1943, 1945, 1946, 1952, 1954, 1960, 1982, 1990, 2009, 2012, 2013
- Mid Tipperary Junior A Football Championship (9): 1963, 1969, 1970, 1981, 1986, 2007, 2008, 2009, 2010

== Notable players ==
- Ned Bowe: All-Ireland SHC-winner (1887)
- Phil Cahill: All-Ireland SHC-winner (1925, 1930)
- John Flanagan: All-Ireland SHC-winner (1971)
- John Joe Hayes: All-Ireland SHC-winner (1925)
- Ned Hayes: All-Ireland SHC-winning captain (1900)
- Bob Mockler: All-Ireland SHC-winning captain (1920)
- John O'Grady: All-Ireland SHC-winner (1958)
- Phil Purcell: All-Ireland SHC-winner (1930)
- Rhys Shelly:All-Ireland SHC-winner (2025)
