= 1930 All-Ireland Senior Hurling Championship final =

1930 All-Ireland Senior Hurling Final
- Event: 1930 All-Ireland Senior Hurling Championship
Tipperary	Dublin
2-7	1-3
- Date: 7 September 1930
- Venue: Croke Park, Dublin
- Referee: Stephen Jordan (Galway)
- Attendance: 21,730

The 1930 All-Ireland Senior Hurling Championship Final was the 43rd All-Ireland Final and the culmination of the 1930 All-Ireland Senior Hurling Championship, an inter-county hurling tournament for the top teams in Ireland. The match was held at Croke Park, Dublin, on 7 September 1930 between Tipperary and Dublin. The Leinster champions lost to their Munster opponents on a score line of 2–7 to 1–3.

== Match details ==
1930-09-07
15:15 UTC+1

Tipperary	2-7 – 1-3	Dublin

Croke Park, Dublin
Attendance: 21,730
Referee: S. Jordan (Galway)

Tipperary	Dublin
