= Phil Purcell (hurler) =

Tipperary hurler

Personal information
- Native name: Pilib Puirséil (Irish)
- Born: 2 November 1902 Moycarkey, County Tipperary, Ireland
- Died: 2 February 1961 (aged 58) Thurles, County Tipperary, Ireland
- Occupation: Sugar factory labourer

Sport
- Sport: Hurling
- Position: Centre-back
Club
- Years: Club
- Moycarkey–Borris
Inter-county
- Years: County
- 1926–1937: Tipperary
Inter-county titles
- Munster titles: 1
- All-Irelands: 1
- NHL: 1

Phil Purcell (13 November 1902 – 2 February 1961) was an Irish hurler who played for his local club Moycarkey–Borris and at senior level for the Tipperary county team from 1926 until 1937.

== Playing career ==
=== Club ===
Purcell played his club hurling with his local club Moycarkey–Borris and enjoyed much success. He won his first senior county title in 1932. It was the first of four county victories for Purcell, the other three coming in 1934, 1937 and 1940.

=== Inter-county ===
Purcell began his inter-county hurling career at a time when there was no minor hurling championship. He first came to prominence with the Tipperary junior team in the early 1920s. He was captain of the team in 1924 as Tipp captured the Munster junior title. Purcell later captured an All-Ireland junior title as Tipperary defeated Galway in the final.

Purcell later joined the Tipperary senior team and made his debut in 1926. It was a time when Cork were dominating the provincial championship. Purcell, however, first tasted major success sin 1928 as Tipp defeated Laois to take the National Hurling League title.

Two years later in 1930 Purcell lined out against Clare in the Munster final. It was Tipperary’s first appearance in the provincial decider in four years; however, they hadn’t won the title in five years. Purcell’s side were the dominant side for the whole game and went on to win by 6-4 to 2-8. It was his first Munster senior title. Tipp later defeated Galway in the All-Ireland semi-final, setting up a championship decider with Dublin. Two goals just before half-time gave Tipp the edge and the team hung on to win by 2-7 to 1-3. It was Purcell’s first and only All-Ireland medal.

Tipperary went into decline following this victory as Limerick became the dominant force in Munster. Purcell retired from inter-county hurling in 1937, shortly before Tipp reclaimed the provincial and All-Ireland titles.

=== Provincial ===
Purcell also lined out with Munster in the inter-provincial hurling competition. He first played for his province in the second year of the Railway Cup competition in 1928. On that occasion he collected his first winners’ medal as Munster defeated Leinster. Coughlan remained on the team and helped Munster to capture a further four titles in-a-row in 1929, 1930 and 1931 when he captained the side. Purcell captured a fifth Railway Cup medal in 1934.

Achievements
Preceded by	All-Ireland Junior Hurling Final winning captain 1924	Succeeded by
Preceded by Dinny Barry-Murphy (Munster)	Interprovincial Hurling Final winning captain 1931	Succeeded by Jim Dermody (Leinster)
Preceded by John Flaherty	All-Ireland Senior Hurling Final referee 1947	Succeeded by Con Murphy
