= Clonmel GAA Ground =

Stadium in Clonmel, Ireland

- Páirc Chluain Meala
- Location within Ireland
- Location: Western Road, Clonmel, Ireland
- Coordinates: 52°21′12″N 7°42′47″W
- Owner: Tipperary GAA
- Capacity: 5,000
- Surface: Grass
- Field size: 142 × 82 m (155 × 90 yd)

Clonmel GAA Ground, also called Clonmel Sportsfield, is a GAA stadium located in the town of Clonmel, County Tipperary, Ireland. It is the home ground of St. Mary's hurling team and Gaelic football team Clonmel Commercials. It is also occasionally used by the Tipperary county football team and has hosted games in the Munster Senior Football Championship, McGrath Cup and National Football League.

Declan Ryan's first game in charge of the Tipperary hurlers took place in Clonmel in January 2011 in the Waterford Crystal Cup against WIT where Tipperary were defeated by a scoreline of 2–17 to 1–19.

== Club ==
The GAA grounds used by Commercials and St Mary's is located at the GAA Grounds on the Western Road in the town centre.

== See also ==
- List of Gaelic Athletic Association stadiums
- List of stadiums in Ireland by capacity
