= Carrick Davins GAA =

Gaelic games club in County Tipperary, Ireland

- Founded: 1922
- Colours: Red and White
- Grounds: Páirc Daibhín
- Coordinates: 52°20′55.11″N 7°25′09.72″W

Playing kits
Standard colours

Carrick Davins GAA is a Gaelic Athletic Association club located in the town of Carrick-on-Suir in south County Tipperary in Ireland. It is one of three GAA clubs in the town, one of which, St Molleran's, is in County Waterford in the southern suburb of Carrickbeg across the River Suir. The club plays both hurling and Gaelic football but is predominantly a hurling club. The club enjoys a rivalry with Carrick Swans GAA. The club is named in honour of Maurice Davin, the first President of the GAA, who lived in the town. The club competes in fixtures organised by the South Tipperary divisional board and Tipperary county board.

== History ==
Carrick-on-Suir has a history of hurling and football going back to the 1800s when there were nine teams in the Carrick catchment area, consisting mainly of families and relations. Games were played in the nine acre field and there were no regulation size of pitch: usually the bounds were the ditch around a field. There were no set numbers of players, and a team could consist of up to 30 players a side.

The club was founded in 1922. In the early years there was a leaning towards the football side of the Association, and green and white jerseys borrowed from neighbours Grangemockler were worn until the 1930s when Cork red was chosen, hence the nickname The Red Rebels. In the early 1930s the club registered as The Davins in honor of the Davin brothers, founders of the GAA.

== Hurling ==
The Davins have won 11 South Tipperary senior hurling titles, two county senior hurling titles and a Munster senior hurling club title, becoming the first Tipperary side to do so.

In 2009, Carrick Davins won the Tipperary Intermediate Hurling Championship title which saw them return to the Senior Grade. They reached a South Tipperary Senior Hurling final in 2011, where they played Mullinahone. Also in 2011, the club enjoyed a South Title in Junior hurling, which was a first in a long time.

In 2012 the club secured eight underage titles. Also in 2012 the club lost some of its hurling greats, including Club President Sean Organ.

The carrick On Suir club also won their first under 21 title in over 50 years on 25 November 2018 the young team included the likes of great up coming hurlers as Micheal whelan, Conor whelan, Ray Cooke and Conor Mackey

=== Honours ===
- Munster Senior Club Hurling Championship (1)
  - 1966; runner-up 1967
- Tipperary Senior Hurling Championship (2)
  - 1966, 1967; runner-up 1964
- South Tipperary Senior Hurling Championship (11)
  - 1965, 1966, 1967, 1969, 1971, 1972, 1973, 1975, 1976, 1977, 1979
- Tipperary Intermediate Hurling Championship (1)
  - 2009
- South Tipperary Intermediate Hurling Championship (4)
  - 1993, 1994, 2005, 2016
- Tipperary Junior Football Championship (1) 1927
- South Tipperary Junior Football Championship (4): 1927, 1965, 1967, 1980
- South Tipperary Junior B Football Championship (2): 1993, 2005
- Tipperary Junior Hurling Championship (2): 1963, 2019
- South Tipperary Junior Hurling Championship (3) 1953, 1956, 1963
- South Tipperary Junior B Hurling Championship (2) 1996, 2011
- South Tipperary Under-21 B Hurling Championship (5) 1964, 1965, 1966, 1967, 2018
- Tipperary Minor B Football Championship (2) 1985, 2002
- South Tipperary Minor B Football Championship (2) 1985, 2002
- South Tipperary Minor C Football Championship (1) 1999
- South Tipperary Minor Hurling Championship (9) 1933, 1934, 1935, 1936, 1947, 1951, 1964, 1966, 1984
- Tipperary Minor B Hurling Championship (1) 2005
- South Tipperary Minor B Hurling Championship (3) 1997, 2002, 2005
- South Tipperary Minor C Hurling Championship (1) 2012

=== Notable players ===
- Mick Roche
- PJ Ryan
- Jimmy Ryan
- Richie McGrath
