= 1887 Tipperary Senior Hurling Championship =

Annual hurling competition season

- Champions: Thurles (1st title); Dinny Maher (captain)
- Runners-up: North Tipperary

The 1887 Tipperary Senior Hurling Championship was the inaugural staging of the Tipperary Senior Hurling Championship since its establishment by the Tipperary County Board.

Thurles won the championship after a 0–03 to 0–00 defeat of North Tipperary in the final. It was their first ever championship title.
