= South Tipperary Senior Hurling Championship =

Hurling competition in Ireland

- Code: Hurling
- Founded: 1907; 119 years ago
- Region: South Tipperary (GAA)
- No. of teams: 4
- Title holders: St Mary's Clonmel (2nd title)
- Most titles: Carrick Swans (26 titles)
- Sponsors: Clonmel Oil
- Official website: Official website

The South Tipperary Senior Hurling Championship (known for sponsorship reasons as the Clonmel Oil South Tipperary Senior Hurling Championship) is an annual hurling competition organised by the South Tipperary Board of the Gaelic Athletic Association since 1907 for senior hurling teams in South Tipperary, Ireland.

The series of games begin in July, with the championship culminating with the final in the same month. The championship has always been played using a knock-out format.

The South Tipperary Championship was, until recent times, an integral part of the wider Tipperary Senior Hurling Championship. The winners and runners-up of the South Tipperary Championship joined their counterparts from the other three divisions to contest the county championship quarter-finals.

Four clubs currently participate in the South Tipperary Championship. The title has been won at least once by 20 different teams. The all-time record-holders are Carrick Swans who have won a total of 23 titles.

== The championship ==
=== Overview ===
The South Tipperary Championship is a knockout tournament with pairings drawn at random — there are no seeds.

Each match is played as a single leg. If a match ends as a draw there is a period of extra time, followed by a second period of extra time should the teams remain deadlocked. If both sides are still level at the end of extra time a replay takes place and so on until a winner is found.

=== Format ===
Quarter-finals: 2 teams contest this round. The winning teams advances to the semi-finals. The losing team is eliminated from the championship.

Semi-finals: 4 teams contest this round. The 2 winning teams advance to the semi-finals. The 2 losing teams are eliminated from the championship.

Final: The final is contested by the two semi-final winners.

=== Participating teams ===
Team	Location	Colours
Carrick Swans	Carrick-on-Suir	Black and white
Killenaule	Killenaule	Red and yellow
Mullinahone	Mullinahone	Green and red
St. Mary's Clonmel	Clonmel	Blue and white

== Roll of honour ==
#	Team	Wins	Years won
1	Carrick Swans	26	1933, 1935, 1936, 1939, 1944, 1945, 1946, 1947, 1948, 1950, 1952, 1958, 1959, 1974, 1978, 1983, 1984, 1985, 1986, 1990, 2000, 2010, 2017, 2022, 2024, 2025
2	Killenaule	23	1916, 1918, 1931, 1932, 1940, 1941, 1942, 1943, 1953, 1954, 1955, 1961, 1963, 1988, 1989, 1991, 2005, 2007, 2008, 2013, 2015, 2018, 2021, 2023
3	Mullinahone	14	1993, 1995, 1997, 1999, 2002, 2003, 2004, 2006, 2009, 2011, 2012, 2014, 2016, 2019
4	Carrick Davins	11	1965, 1966, 1967, 1969, 1971, 1972, 1973, 1975, 1976, 1977, 1979
5	Boherlahen-Dualla	8	1915, 1924, 1925, 1926, 1927, 1928, 1929, 1930
5	Ballingarry	8	1949, 1980, 1987, 1992, 1994, 1996, 1998, 2001
6	Marlfield	4	1960, 1962, 1964, 1970
7	Fethard	3	1919, 1937, 1938
8	Racecourse	2	1909, 1910
8	Tipp O'Leary's	2	1912, 1920
8	Cashel	2	1913, 1914
8	St. Mary's Clonmel	2	1981, 2026
9	St. Ailbe's	1	1911
9	Kilmoyler	1	1923
9	Moyglass	1	1934
9	Coolmoyne	1	1951
9	Pádraig Pearses	1	1956
9	Na Piarsaigh (Tipperary)	1	1957
9	Ballybacon-Grange	1	1968
9	St. Augustine's	1	1982

== Finals ==
Year	Winner	Score	Opponent	Score
2026	St. Mary's Clonmel	1-16	Mullinahone	0-17
2025	Carrick Swans	1-17	Killenaule	0-15
2024	Carrick Swans	3-19	Killenaule	1-16
2023	Killenaule	1-20	Carrick Swans	2-16
2022	Carrick Swans	1-21	Mullinahone	1-17
2021	Killenaule	1-20	Mullinahone	2-14
2020	Cancelled due to the COVID-19 pandemic			
2019	Killenaule	1-18	Carrick Swans	1-16
2018	Killenaule	0-20	Mullinahone	1-12
2017	Carrick Swans	1-13	Killenaule	0-04
2016	Mullinahone	2-15	Killenaule	1-17
2015	Killenaule	0-21	Mullinahone	2-13
2014	Mullinahone	2-11	Killenaule	2-08
2013	Killenaule	1-22	Carrick Swans	2-16
2012	Mullinahone	1-17	Carrick Swans	2-09
2011	Mullinahone	2-20	Carrick Davins	2-09
2010	Carrick Swans	1-16	Killenaule	2-11
2009	Mullinahone	1-17	Killenaule	1-16
2008	Killenaule	3-15	Ballingarry	1-10
2007	Killenaule	0-14	Ballingarry	0-13
2006	Mullinahone	2-14	Killenaule	1-16
2005	Killenaule	1-19 (2-21 R)	Ballingarry	1-19 (3-16 R)
2004	Mullinahone	2-12	Killenaule	0-09
2003	Mullinahone	3-14	Ballingarry	1-10
2002	Mullinahone	2-18	Killenaule	0-12
2001	Ballingarry	0-11	Mullinahone	2-04
2000	Carrick Swans	1-11	Ballingarry	1-10
1999	Mullinahone	3-26	Carrick Swans	1-09
1998	Ballingarry	1-14	Carrick Swans	3-07
1997	Mullinahone	3-16	Ballingarry	3-13
1996	Ballingarry	2-17	Killenaule	1-10
1995	Mullinahone	5-11	Carrick Davins	0-10
1994	Ballingarry	4-09	Mullinahone	1-04
1993	Mullinahone	1-11	Carrick Swans	0-12
1992	Ballingarry	2-12	Killenaule	1-10
1991	Killenaule	0-15	Carrick Swans	1-10
1990	Carrick Swans	3-07	Killenaule	2-07
1989	Killenaule	0-13	Carrick Swans	0-09
1988	Killenaule	1-14	St. Mary's Clonmel	2-04
1987	Ballingarry	2-11	Killenaule	2-03
1986	Carrick Swans	0-13	Éire Óg (Ballingarry/Killenaule)	2-03
1985	Carrick Swans	2-10	St. Mary's Clonmel	1-09
1984	Carrick Swans	2-08	Éire Óg (Ballingarry/Killenaule)	0-13
1983	Carrick Swans	3-11	Éire Óg (Ballingarry/Killenaule)	1-11
1982	St. Augustine's	4-12	St. Mary's Clonmel	2-07
1981	St. Mary's Clonmel	1-14	Carrick Swans	1-12
1980	Ballingarry	1-03	Carrick Davins	0-05
1979	Carrick Davins	1-10	Fionn Mac Cumhaill	1-07
1978	Carrick Swans	4-11	Fionn Mac Cumhaill	1-04
1977	Carrick Davins			
1976	Carrick Davins			
1975	Carrick Davins			
1974	Carrick Swans			
1973	Carrick Davins			
1972	Carrick Davins			
1971	Carrick Davins			
1970	Marlfield			
1969	Carrick Swans			
1968	Ballybacon-Grange		Marlfield	
1967	Carrick Davins		Slievenamon	
1966	Carrick Davins		Slievenamon	
1965	Carrick Davins		Marlfield	
1964	Marlfield			
1963	Killenaule			
1962	Marlfield			
1961	Killenaule		Marlfield	
1960	Marlfield		Carrick Swans	
1959	Carrick Swans			
1958	Carrick Swans			
1957	Na Piarsaigh (Tipperary)			
1956	Pádraig Pearses			
1955	Killenaule			
1954	Killenaule			
1953	Killenaule			
1952	Carrick Davins			
1951	Coolmoyne			
1950	Carrick Swans			
1949	Ballingarry			
1948	Carrick Swans			
1947	Carrick Swans			
1946	Carrick Swans			
1945	Carrick Swans			
1944	Carrick Swans			
1943	Killenaule			
1942	Killenaule			
1941	Killenaule			
1940	Killenaule			
1939	Carrick Swans			
1938	Fethard			
1937	Fethard			
1936	Carrick Swans			
1935	Carrick Swans			
1934	Moyglass			
1933	Carrick Swans			
1932	Killenaule			
1931	Killenaule			
1930	Boherlahan-Dualla			
1929	Boherlahan-Dualla			
1928	Boherlahan-Dualla			
1927	Boherlahan-Dualla			
1926	Boherlahan-Dualla			
1925	Boherlahan-Dualla			
1924	Boherlahan-Dualla			
1923	Kilmoyler			
1922	No Championship			
1921	No Championship			
1920	Tipp O'Leary's			
1919	Fethard			
1918	Killenaule			
1917	No Championship			
1916	Killenaule			
1915	Boherlahan-Dualla			
1914	Cashel King Cormacs			
1913	Cashel King Cormacs			
1912	Tipp O'Leary's			
1911	St. Ailbe's			
1910	Racecourse			
1909	Racecourse			
