= Coughlin =

Coughlin (/ˈkɒflɪn/ KOF-lin, /ˈkɒklɪn/ KOK-lin or, /ˈkɒɡlɪn/ KOG-lin according to the cases, traditional Irish English: /ˈkɔːlɪn/ KAW-lin) is a surname of Irish origin (Mac Cochláin or Ó Cochláin), meaning 'son of the one with the cloak'. Notable people with the surname include:

- Alex Coughlin (born 1993), retired American professional wrestler, Bullet Club member
- Bill Coughlin (1878–1943), American baseball player
- Father Charles Coughlin (1891–1979), radio political commentator of the 1930s
- Carter Coughlin (born 1997), American football player
- Con Coughlin (born 1955), British journalist
- Daniel Coughlin (born 1934), Chaplain of the US House of Representatives 2000–2011
- Daniel P. Coughlin (author), American writer
- Ed Coughlin (1861–1952), American baseball player
- Edward J. Coughlin (1885–1945), New York politician
- Jack Coughlin (disambiguation), several people
- John Coughlin (disambiguation), several people
- Lawrence Coughlin (1929–2001), US Congressman from Pennsylvania
- Margaret Coughlin (1912–1996), American politician
- Natalie Coughlin (born 1982), American swimmer, Olympic gold medalist
- Paul Coughlin (born 1992), English cricketer
- Roscoe Coughlin (1868–1951), Major League Baseball player
- Russell Coughlin (born 1960), Welsh footballer
- Ryan Coughlin (born 1973), Canadian football player
- Stephen Coughlin, American lawyer and intelligence analyst
- Tom Coughlin (born 1946), head coach of the New York Giants
- Tom Coughlin (Walmart) (1949–2016), American business executive

== See also ==
- Coughlin Campanile at South Dakota State University
- Hugh Coflin (1928–2021), Canadian ice hockey player
- Coughlan
- Coghlan (surname)
