= Coughlan =

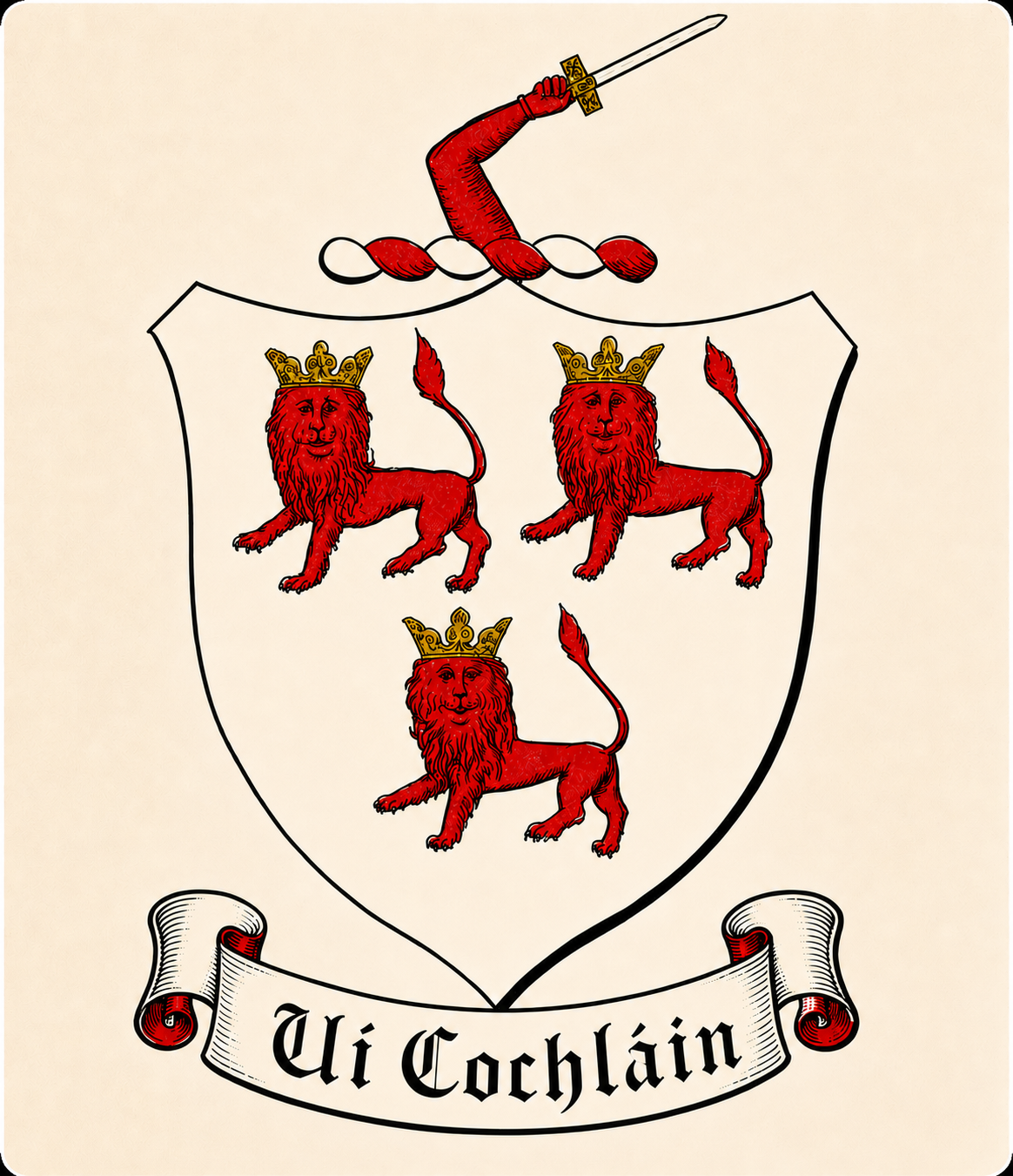
Coughlan Family Arms rendered in Gaelic with three passant guardant red lions with crowns. Source: Genealogical History of Irish Families 1895.

Coughlan is a surname of Irish origin (Mac Cochláin or Ó Cochláin), meaning 'son of the one with the cloak'. Other anglicisations of this surname include Coghlan, Coghlin and Coughlin. Notable people with the surname include:

- Cathal Coughlan (politician) (1937–1986), Irish Fianna Fáil politician
- Cathal Coughlan (singer) (1960 - 2022), Irish singer-songwriter
- Clement Coughlan (1942–1983), Irish politician
- Elaine Coughlan, Irish venture capitalist
- Frank Coughlan (1904–1979), Australian jazz musician
- Gerry Coughlan (1903–1983), Irish middle-distance runner
- James Coughlan (field hockey) (born 1990), New Zealand field hockey player
- John Coughlan (hurler) (1898–1965), Irish sportsman
- John Coughlan, Australian airman who won the Conspicuous Gallantry Medal in 1968
- Laurence Coughlan (before 1766 – after 1773), Irish-born itinerant preacher
- Maria Coughlan (Moravskaya) (1890 – after 1947), Russian and American poet, writer, translator and literary critic; wife of Edward Coughlan
- Mark Coughlan (born 1982), Australian rules footballer
- Mary Coughlan (politician) (born 1965), Irish Fianna Fáil politician and Tánaiste (deputy prime minister)
- Mary Coughlan (singer) (born 1956), Irish jazz singer
- Nicola Coughlan (born 1987), Irish actress
- Richard Coughlan (1947–2013), English musician
- Stephen Coughlan (1910–1994), Irish politician
- Terence Coughlan (born 1956), Zimbabwean cricketer
- Tom Coughlan (hurler) (1881–after 1911), Irish hurler
- Tom Coughlan (rugby union) (1934–2017) New Zealand rugby player
