= Coughran =

Coughran is a surname. Notable people with the surname include:

- John Coughran (born 1951), American basketball player
- Tom B. Coughran (1906–1993), American banker, soldier, and public servant

== See also ==
- Coughlan
- Coughran Peak, a mountain of Ross Island, Antarctica
