= John Coughlan =

John Coughlan may refer to:

- John Coughlan (hurler)
- John Coughlan (politician)

== See also ==
- John Coughlin (disambiguation)
