= Daniel Coughlan =

Daniel, Dan or Danny Coughlan may refer to:

- Dan Coughlan (Blackrock hurler), played for Cork from 1894 until 1903
- Dan Coughlan (St Finbarr's hurler), played for Cork from 1916 until 1919
- Danny Coughlan (1970–2026), English singer and guitarist

== See also ==
- Daniel Coghlan (1812–1877), Irish-American industrialist and politician
- Daniel Coughlin (born 1934), American priest
