= Koglin =

Koglin is a surname. Notable people with the surname include:

- Anke Lutz (née Koglin, born 1970), German female chess player
- Brian Koglin (born 1997), German footballer
- Mike Koglin, German DJ and producer

== See also ==
- Coughlin
