= Jack Coughlin =

Jack Coughlin may refer to:

- Jack Coughlin (author) (born 1966), author and United States Marine
- Jack Coughlin (artist) (born 1932), artist of Irish-American heritage
- Jack Coughlin (ice hockey) (1892–?), Canadian ice hockey player

== See also ==
- John Coughlin (disambiguation)
