= Coghlan (surname) =

Coghlan is an anglicisation of the Irish surname Ó Coghláin which means "descendant of Coghlán" or Mac Coghláin which means "son of Coghlán". Notable people with the surname include:

- Charles F. Coghlan (actor, born 1896) (1896–1972), American actor and writer
- Charles Francis Coghlan (1842–1899), Anglo-Irish actor and playwright
- Charles Coghlan (politician) (1863–1927), South Africa-born lawyer and politician who served as Premier of Southern Rhodesia
- Chris Coghlan (born 1985), American baseball player
- Chris Coghlan (politician), British politician
- Daniel Coghlan (1812–1877), American politician
- Dylan Coghlan (born 1998), Canadian ice hockey player
- Eamonn Coghlan (born 1952), Irish track and field athlete
- Jeremiah Coghlan (c. 1776–1844), Royal Navy officer
- John Coghlan (disambiguation)
- Joseph Coghlan (1844–1908), U.S. Navy rear admiral
- Junior Coghlan (1916–2009), American actor
- Monica Coghlan (1951–2001), English prostitute involved in a political scandal
- Paul Coghlan (1944–2023), Irish Fine Gael politician
- Paul Coghlan (judge), Australian judge
- Rose Coghlan (1851–1932), English actress
