= John Coghlan =

John Coghlan may refer to:

- John Coghlan (cricketer) (1867–1945), South African cricketer
- John Coghlan (drummer) (born 1946), drummer for the band Status Quo
- John Coghlan (engineer) (1824–1890), Irish-born engineer in Argentina
- John Coghlan (footballer) (1946–2016), Australian footballer for South Melbourne
- John Coghlan (hurler) (born 1989), Irish hurler
- John M. Coghlan (1835–1879), U.S. Representative from California
- Johnny Coghlan (1876–1916), Australian footballer for Melbourne
