= Tom B. Coughran =

American banker, soldier, and public servant

Tom B. Coughran (March 18, 1906, near Visalia, California – October 2, 1993) was an American banker, soldier and public servant. He graduated from Visalia High School in 1923 and received a degree in economics from Stanford University in 1927. Following graduation he joined the First National Bank of Exeter, California. When that bank was bought by Bank of America, Coughran advanced quickly. He was named manager of the Exeter branch in 1932 and promoted to head of the Monterey branch in 1941.

In 1942, Coughran enlisted in the U.S. Army. He attended the Army Finance School at Fort Benjamin Harrison and was stationed at the Office of the Chief of Army Finance in Washington, D.C. until May 1944. At that time he was transferred to the newly formed G-5 Civil Affairs Division at Supreme Headquarters Allied Expeditionary Force, Europe (SHAEF). He was headquartered in London, Paris, and finally Hochst, an I.G. Farben company town near Frankfurt. He was discharged from the Army in March 1946 after rising to the rank of lieutenant colonel.

Coughran returned to the Bank of America as manager of the Oakland, California branch. Soon after, he became head of the newly formed International Banking Department in San Francisco. In that capacity he traveled widely in the Far East to facilitate the expansion of the Bank of America into the Philippines, Thailand, Nationalist China, Japan and other locations.

In fall 1957, U.S. President Dwight D. Eisenhower appointed Coughran Assistant Secretary of the Treasury for International Affairs. In December 1957, he became Executive Director of the World Bank and International Monetary Fund. During his thirteen months with the Treasury Department he participated in the North Atlantic Treaty Organization conference in Paris, a presidential fact-finding mission to Central American and the World Bank meeting in New Delhi. He also participated in the formation of the International Development Association and the Colombo Conference in Seattle.

In accordance with a prior agreement, he returned to the Bank of America in January 1959 as Executive Vice President and CEO of Bank of America, International, a wholly owned subsidiary of Bank of America. From 1966 to 1968, he served as Chairman of the Business Advisory Council to the Organization for Economic Cooperation and Development. He was also one of the founders of the World Banking Corporation, a holding company that was expanded and restructured in 1971 as WOBACO.

Coughran retired from the Bank of America in 1971 and from WOBACO in 1976. He moved with his wife from New York to the Washington, D.C. area where he remained until his death on October 2, 1993.
