= Donald A. Davis =

American novelist (born 1939)

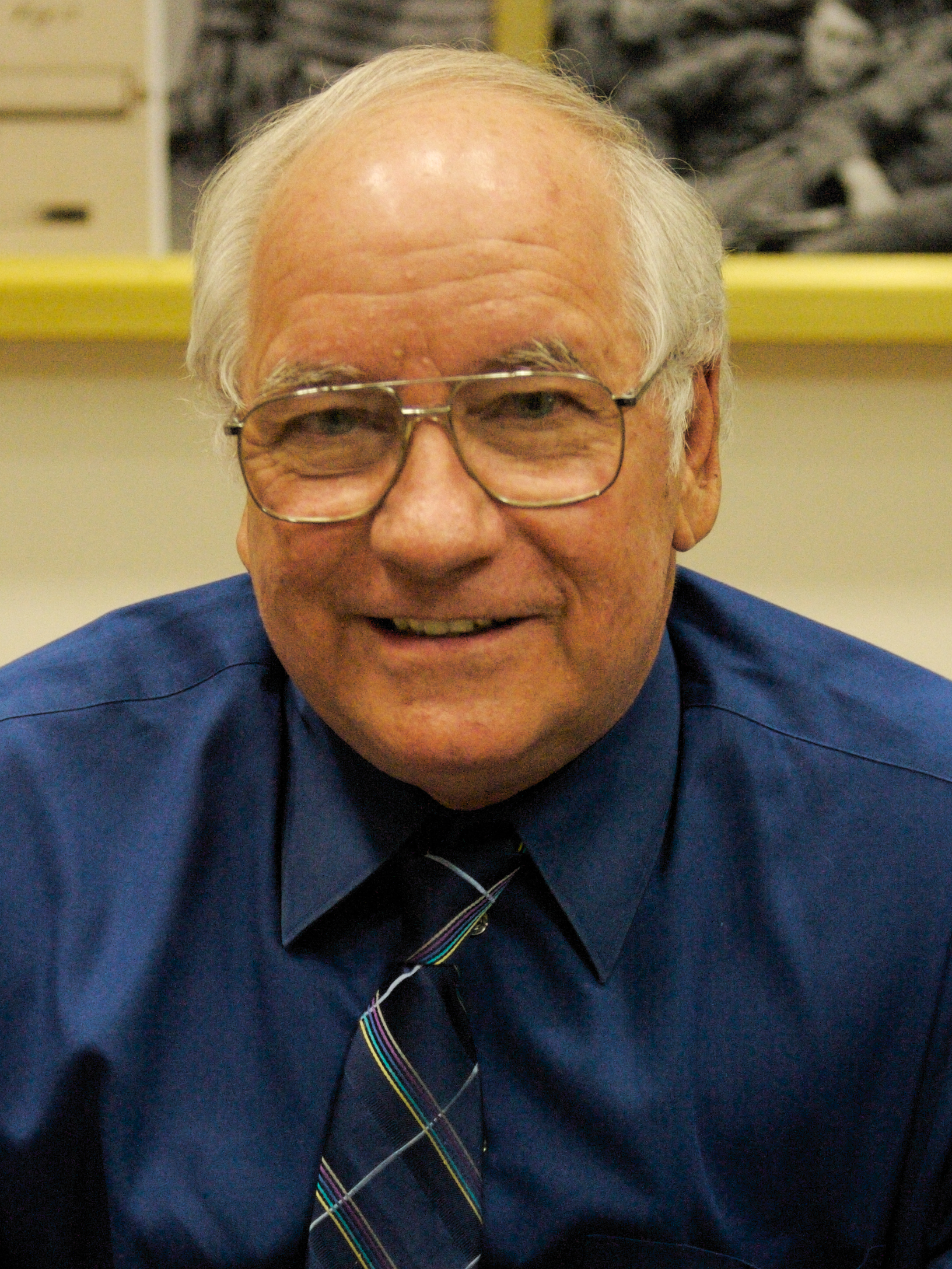
Davis in 2010

Donald Alan Davis (born October 5, 1939) is an American writer, novelist and former war correspondent. He was a writer of military histories, military thrillers, and, along with Jack Coughlin, was co-author of the New York Times bestselling book, Shooter.

== Books ==
- Death Cruise (1996)
- The Last Man on the Moon: Astronaut Eugene Cernan and America's Race in Space, with Eugene Cernan (1999)
- Shooter: The Autobiography of the Top-Ranked Marine Sniper, with Jack Coughlin (2005)
- Lightning Strike: The Secret Mission to Kill Admiral Yamamoto and Avenge Pearl Harbor (2005)
- Stonewall Jackson: A Biography, foreword by Wesley K. Clark (2007)

=== Kyle Swanson sniper series ===
In 2007, with St. Martin's Press, Coughlin and Davis began writing their military-thriller series featuring Marine protagonist Kyle Swanson.

- Kill Zone (2007)
- Dead Shot (2009)
- Clean Kill (2010)
- An Act of Treason (2011)
- Running the Maze (2012)
- Time to Kill (2013)
- On Scope (2014)
- Night of the Cobra (2015)
- Long Shot (2016)
