= Jack Coughlin (author) =

United States Marine (born 1966)

- Born: January 12, 1966 (age 60); Waltham, Massachusetts, U.S.
- Military career
- Allegiance: United States
- Branch: United States Marine Corps
- Service years: 1985–2005
- Rank: Gunnery sergeant
- Nickname: "Gabriel" (Callsign during time in Somalia)
- Unit: 3rd Battalion, 4th Marines
- Conflicts: Task Force Somalia; Iraq War
- Awards: Bronze Star (with V)

Jack Coughlin (born January 12, 1966) is a retired United States Marine Corps Gunnery sergeant and the author of the autobiography Shooter.

== Early life ==
Coughlin was born and raised in Waltham, Massachusetts, the youngest of five children. At a young age, Jack was temporarily blinded in his right eye (his shooting eye) when a sharp rock ricocheted from a fight between two older boys. His eye eventually healed and his sight in the eye was 20/10. At age 19, Coughlin decided to enlist in the Marine Corps.

== Military career ==
Coughlin enlisted in the Marines in 1985 and completed his recruit training at Marine Corps Recruit Depot Parris Island. His first experiences with operating firearms occurred during Marine Corps recruit training, including shooting a rifle. He attended Scout Sniper school but never graduated. He was also stationed at the Subic Bay naval base in the Philippines with Alpha Company, Marine Barracks Starboard Security Platoon, and later the Jungle Operations Branch. Eventually, he was assigned to the 3rd Battalion 4th Marines, part of the 7th Marine Regiment of the 1st Marine Division.

Coughlin was deployed with Weapons Company, 1st Battalion, 7th Marines as a "Professionally Instructed Gunman" (P.I.G.) during Operation Restore Hope. He was involved in an attack on an enemy compound north of Mogadishu, Somalia and assigned a hide position to take out targets of opportunity and to report enemy movement. The compound had a ZSU-23-4 Shilka anti-aircraft weapon (also referred to as "Zeus") and tanks. Coughlin operated the manned ZSU-23-4 and successfully dispatched the enemy, permitting the attack to be effective. He was deployed with this unit to Iraq in 2003 during Operation Iraqi Freedom, the 2003 invasion of Iraq with Basra. He spent some time with British Army troops in Basra, then fought with his unit north of Baghdad, and he was present at the destruction of Saddam Hussein's statue. In Iraq, he received his second Bronze Star Medal with valor device. He retired from the USMC when he returned home from Iraq.

== Bibliography ==
Coughlin's autobiography Shooter recounts his military experiences in Iraq, written with Captains Casey Kuhlman and Donald A. Davis and published in 2005.

He has written ten Kyle Swanson Sniper Novels with Davis:

- Kill Zone. St. Martin's Press. 2007. ISBN 978-0-312-94567-1.
- Dead Shot. St. Martin's Press. 2009. ISBN 978-0-312-37912-4.
- Clean Kill. St. Martin's Press. 2010. ISBN 978-0-312-35807-5.
- An Act of Treason. St. Martin's Press. 2011. ISBN 978-0-312-61201-6.
- Running the Maze. St. Martin's Press. 2012. ISBN 978-0-312-55495-8.
- Time to Kill. St. Martin's Press. 2013. ISBN 978-1-250-01287-6.
- On Scope. St. Martin's Press. 2014. ISBN 978-1-250-03793-0.
- The Night of the Cobra. St. Martin's Press. 2015. ISBN 978-1-250-05782-2.
- Long Shot. St. Martin's Press. 2016. ISBN 978-1-250-07295-5.
- In the Crosshairs. St. Martin's Press. 2017. ISBN 9781250103536

He's also written a book with John R. Bruning:

- Shock Factor: American Snipers in the War on Terror. St. Martin's Press. 2014. ISBN 978-1-250-01655-3.

== See also ==
- Carlos Hathcock†, United States Marine Corps Gunnery Sergeant sniper with a service record of 93 confirmed kills
- Simo Häyhä†, Finnish sniper with the highest recorded number of confirmed sniper kills in any major war (505)
- Chris Kyle†, former US Navy SEAL who holds the record for the most confirmed kills in U.S. military history, with 160 kills during the Iraq War
- Lyudmila Pavlichenko†, Soviet sniper; most successful female sniper in history, with 309 kills
