= Elaine Coughlan =

Irish venture capitalist

Elaine Coughlan is an Irish venture capitalist. She is a co-founder and general partner of Atlantic Bridge Capital, which helps companies in the technology sector enter global markets and attract international investors. She is also co-founder of Summit Bridge Capital, a fund co-managed by Atlantic Bridge Capital and WestSummit Capital, a Chinese firm, which invests in technology companies in Ireland. She has been named to numerous "Top Women" lists, including the Sunday Independent's 2014 list of "The 50 Most Influential and Powerful Women in Business".

== Education ==
Coughlan qualified as an accountant at age 18, receiving her diploma as a chartered accountant in 1991 from the National College of Ireland. In 2012 she earned diplomas in corporate governance from the Institute of Directors and in company direction from the Irish Management Institute of Dublin.

She is a qualified Chartered Director and a Fellow of Chartered Accountants Ireland.

== Career ==
She began her career in 1986 as a senior audit manager at Ernst & Young, a position she held for eight years. From 1994 to 1996 she worked for CBT Systems in California, leading their first public offering and secondary public offering on NASDAQ.

She next served as audit director for IONA Technologies, and also led that company's first public offering on NASDAQ in 1997. From 1999 to 2002 she worked at Parthus Technologies, rising from corporate controller to vice president of finance to chief financial officer (CFO), and also assisted Parthus in its first public offering in 2000. From 2002 to 2003 she was CFO and secretary of CEVA, Inc.

In 2004 she and three partners founded Atlantic Bridge Capital. In 2006 she co-founded and served as director of GloNav, a United States-based technology firm with R&D facilities in Ireland; GloNav was purchased by NXP Semiconductor in 2007. Coughlan co-founded Summit Bridge Capital in January 2014.

== Other activities ==
Coughlan was appointed by the Government of Ireland to the board of Enterprise Ireland in 2014. She is also a member of the board of directors of Acision, FieldAware, Sophia Search Limited, Going for Growth, and DCU Ryan Academy Female Propellor program. In 2015 she was appointed to the board of the Institute of Directors in London.

She frequently speaks at conferences about the venture capital market in Ireland and abroad. In a May 2015 interview with the Sunday Independent, she asserted that the United States was a better environment for startup companies than Ireland, due to the latter's high capital gains tax.

== Honors ==
In 2014 she was ranked #40 of "The 50 Most Influential and Powerful Women in Business" by the Sunday Independent, which described her as "one of the best connected and savviest people in high-calibre technology investment in Ireland". The same year, she was named one of "The Top 38 Women in Technology" by IrishCentral, one of "The 50 Most Inspiring Women in European Tech" by the Inspiring Fifty: Europe, and one of "The Top 100 Women in Science, Technology, Engineering and Maths" by Silicon Republic's Women Invent Tomorrow campaign.

== Personal ==
Coughlan and her husband reside in the Wicklow Mountains.
