= Jack Coughlin (artist) =

American painter (1932–2025)

- Born: John Joseph Coughlin Jr. 19 February 1932; Greenwich, Connecticut, U.S.
- Died: 26 February 2025 (aged 93); Provincetown, Massachusetts, U.S.
- Education: Rhode Island School of Design; Art Students League of New York
- Known for: Painting, drawing, printmaking, sculpture
- Awards: Dessie Greer Prize – National Academy; 2007

Jack Coughlin (February 19, 1932 – February 26, 2025) was an Irish-American heritage artist who is best known for his portraits of literary figures and musicians. As a figurative artist and member of the National Academy of Design, Coughlin's work is in many prominent collections including the Metropolitan Museum and the Museum of Modern Art in New York, the National Collection of Fine Arts in Washington D.C., the Norfolk Museum of Arts and Sciences in Virginia, the Worcester Art Museum in Massachusetts, the University of Colorado, the Philadelphia Free Public Library, Staedelsches Kunstinstitut, Frankfort, Germany, and the New University of Ulster, Coleraine, Northern Ireland. Coughlin died on 26 February 2025, at the age of 93.

== Education ==
In the early 1950s, Coughlin studied at the Art Students League of New York then at the Rhode Island School of Design. He graduated from RISD in 1953 with a BFA in illustration. Following his graduation, Coughlin spent time in Greenwich Village before being drafted in the fall of 1954. He was stationed in Hawaii and Japan where he did illustration work for propaganda leaflets. In 1956, after the war, Coughlin returned to RISD and began his MFA in printmaking.

Coughlin briefly left RISD to accept a position at the University of Massachusetts in Amherst as an illustrator of university publications and to do freelance illustration for popular crime fiction, but he soon returned to RISD to complete his MFA in printmaking. While there, he studied with the printmaker Herbert Lewis Fink.

== Art ==
Although Coughlin's education coincided with the heyday of Abstract Expressionism, he was always drawn to figurative traditions in European and American art. Coughlin's portraits were regularly commissioned for The New Republic magazine and have been published in several volumes of poetry in Ireland and the United States. However, in prints and drawings from the 1960s to the present, he has also pursued a vein of imagery that is much less naturalistic and that explores a range of sources, from the anatomical drawings of George Stubbs to the grotesque hybrids of European printmakers like Francisco Goya and Martin Schongauer. In many metamorphic, dream-like images, absurd and mysterious juxtapositions of the human and animal join in an irrational evolutionary journey. Here his automatic drawing practice is akin to that of the Surrealists and is wed to his interests in the existential wordplay of Samuel Beckett.

Coughlin was elected to the National Academy of Design in 1972. Coughlin was a prolific artist and illustrator, producing numerous lithographs, etchings, and woodcuts. The New Republic magazine commissioned dozens of his portraits. His printmaking was internationally recognized and collected by the Metropolitan Museum, the Smithsonian, the Boston Public Library, among other museum, university and library collections. Throughout his career, working from life and teaching life drawing informed his representations of the human figure. Wild animals, especially owls, rhinos, and elephants were sources of endless fascination across mediums. In his most imaginative work, human and animal figures merge in metamorphic, hybrid, sometimes humorous forms that evoke surrealist dream worlds and old master compositions. His many drawings and caricatures also attest to his great love for the cats and the dogs in his life.

In 1964, Coughlin and his wife, Joan Hopkins, first rented and later owned the Golden Cod Gallery on East Commercial Street in Wellfleet where their artwork is still on view in the summer. The historic building had served as a blacksmith's shop and as an early site of Hatch's Fish Market.

== Teaching career ==
In 1960 Coughlin was hired as an assistant professor in the newly established Fine Arts Department at the University of Massachusetts Amherst. He taught printmaking and drawing there for 35 years, celebrated for his combinations of innovative and traditional techniques during the resurgence of intaglio, lithograph, and woodcut printmaking in the 1960s and 1970s. In 2005, Coughlin received the Gladys E. Cook prize at the 2005 annual exhibition at the National Academy of Design.

== Connection with Ireland ==
In the summer of 1965 Coughlin and his wife travelled Europe by car. Coughlin's artistic career was significantly impacted by his experiences on this trip. In addition to visiting old master print collections and art museums, Jack encountered animals in the newly opened Basel zoo that would feature in many of his hybrid and metamorphic prints. Particularly important was his time in Dublin, where he met Liam Miller, the publisher of the Dolmen Press who introduced him to much of the Dublin art world. Coughlin began exhibiting regularly in Dublin at the David Hendriks Gallery through the 1990s, was a member of the Dublin Arts Club, and forged close friendships with printmakers at the National College of Art and Design, including John Kelly and Alice Hanratty. Through his Irish connections, he met his literary hero Samuel Beckett in Paris in 1986. In different mediums, Jack made many portraits of Beckett and many other modern Irish writers, skills he later turned to portraits of classical, jazz, and blues musicians.
