= John Coghlan (footballer) =

Australian rules footballer

Personal information
- Full name: John Martin Coghlan
- Born: 27 November 1946
- Died: 21 November 2016 (aged 69)
- Original team: Old Paradians
- Height: 185 cm (6 ft 1 in)
- Weight: 86 kg (190 lb)

Playing career^{1}
Years	Club	Games (Goals)
1969	South Melbourne	2 (1)
- ^{1} Playing statistics correct to the end of 1969.

John Martin Coghlan (27 November 1946 – 21 November 2016) was an Australian rules footballer who played with South Melbourne in the Victorian Football League (VFL).
