= Terence Coughlan =

Zimbabwean cricketer (born 1956)

Personal information
- Full name: Terence Daniel Coughlan
- Born: 25 February 1956 (age 70); Gwelo, Midlands, Southern Rhodesia
- Batting: Right-handed
- Bowling: Right-arm leg break

Domestic team information
- Years: Team
- 1993/94–1995/96: Mashonaland Country Districts

Career statistics
Competition	FC	LA
Matches	7	5
Runs scored	46	4
Batting average	7.66	4.00
100s/50s	0/0	0/0
Top score	25	3*
Balls bowled	851	228
Wickets	14	4
Bowling average	28.50	44.00
5 wickets in innings	1	0
10 wickets in match	0	0
Best bowling	5/16	2/42
Catches/stumpings	1/–	1/–
- Source: ESPNcricinfo, 17 July 2021

Terence Daniel Coughlan (born 25 February 1956) is a former Zimbabwean cricketer. A right-handed batsman and right-arm leg break bowler, he played two first-class matches for Mashonaland Country Districts during the 1993–94 Logan Cup.

Coughlan played four first-class matches for Zimbabwe-Rhodesia B in the 1979/80 Castle Bowl tournament and one match for Zimbabwe B against Pakistan B in 1990. He also played List A cricket for Zimbabwe and Zimbabwe Country Districts, as well as one match for Mashonaland Country Districts against Tasmania in 1995.

Coughlan was born in Gwelo (now Gweru), Midlands.
