= Margaret Coughlin =

American politician

Member of the Washington House of Representatives from the 46th district
- In office 1937–1939

Personal details
- Born: November 5, 1912 Washington
- Died: February 3, 1996 (aged 83) Seattle
- Party: Democratic
- Education: University of Washington

Margaret Coughlin (November 5, 1912 – February 3, 1996) was an American politician. She was a Democrat, representing District 46 in the Washington House of Representatives which included parts of King County, from 1937 to 1939. She graduated from the University of Washington.
