= John Coughlin =

John Coughlin may refer to:

== Sportsmen ==
- John Coughlin (footballer) (born 1963), head coach of East Stirlingshire F.C.
- John Coughlin (soccer) (born 1972), retired American soccer player
- John Coughlin (figure skater) (1985–2019), American pair skater
- John Coughlin (ice hockey), Canadian

== Others ==
- John Coughlin (alderman) (1860–1938), Chicago
- John Coughlin (weatherman) (1925–2001), Chicago
- John Coughlin (police officer) (1874–1951), American law enforcement officer in the New York City Police Department
- John W. Coughlin (1861–1920), American physician and politician who served as mayor of Fall River, Massachusetts
- John Coughlin (soldier) (1837–1912), American soldier in the American Civil War

== See also ==
- Jack Coughlin (disambiguation)
