= Daniel Coghlan =

American politician (1812–1877)

Member of the New Jersey State Assembly from the Morris County 1st district
- In office 1868–1868

Personal details
- Born: Ireland

Daniel Coghlan (January 1, 1812 – March 22, 1877) was an Irish-American industrialist and politician. He was a member of New Jersey General Assembly from 1868 - ? for the Morris County 1st District, then encompassing Chatham, Hanover, Morris and Passaic townships.

In 1855, Coghlan purchased the Jefferson mill, near Monroe, and operated it until it burned down in 1861.

He purchased the Eden papermill in Whippany, New Jersey in 1861.

He was a founding trustee of Seton Hall University as a signatory to the college's 1861 charter.

He founded Our Lady of Mercy in Whippany, New Jersey for the Catholic employees of his paper mills.

He was a director of the First National Bank of Morristown.

He died suddenly of a heart attack on March 22, 1877, while in New York City on a business trip.
