= 1947 All-Ireland Senior Hurling Championship final =

1947 All-Ireland Senior Hurling Final
- Event: 1947 All-Ireland Senior Hurling Championship
Kilkenny	Cork
0-14	2-7
- Date: 7 September 1947
- Venue: Croke Park, Dublin
- Man of the Match: Terry Leahy
- Referee: Phil Purcell (Tipperary)
- Attendance: 61,510
- Weather: Dry and sunny.

The 1947 All-Ireland Senior Hurling Championship Final was the 60th All-Ireland Final and the culmination of the 1947 All-Ireland Senior Hurling Championship, an inter-county hurling tournament for the top teams in Ireland. The match was held at Croke Park, Dublin, on 7 September 1947, between Kilkenny and Cork. The Munster champions lost to their Leinster opponents on a score line of 0-14 to 2-7.

== All-Ireland final ==
=== Introduction ===
This was the second consecutive meeting of Cork and Kilkenny in the All-Ireland final. Cork went into this game as reigning champions, after trouncing their great rivals twelve months earlier. This was Kilkenny’s third consecutive appearance in an All-Ireland final; however, they had yet to claim a victory. A defeat in 1947 would earn for Kilkenny the unenviable distinction of being the first team to lose three All-Ireland finals in-a-row. A victory, however, would give Kilkenny a first All-Ireland triumph since the great ‘thunder and lightning final’ against Cork in 1939. Cork, on the other hand, were enjoying a remarkably successful decade in terms of All-Ireland triumphs. This was their seventh appearance in the All-Ireland decider in nine championship seasons. After losing to Kilkenny in 1939 the team regrouped and went on to claim an unprecedented four-in-a-row from 1941 until 1944. The chain was broken in 1945, however, Cork claimed a fifth All-Ireland crown inside six years in 1946. To win in 1947 would give Cork a remarkable sixth All-Ireland title in seven years, thus bettering similar records set by Tipperary and Kilkenny at the turn of the century.

=== Pre-match ===
Just over 61,000 people packed into Croke Park on a pleasant, sunny afternoon for the All-Ireland showdown. In the Kilkenny dressing-room the team were faced with a late set-back when Bill Walsh was forced to cry-off with an injury. Jimmy Heffernan was brought in as a late substitute for Walsh. Paddy Grace, the Kilkenny corner-back, also suffered a knee injury. He played in the match but did not take part in the pre-match parade.

=== First half ===
At 3:15pm the sliotar was thrown in by referee Phil Purcell, an All-Ireland-winner with Tipperary in 1930, and the greatest All-Ireland final began. Kilkenny had decided on their tactics well in advance. Cork’s full-back and half-back lines, as well as their goalkeeper, Tom Mulcahy, were virtually impregnable and had earned a reputation for not giving away goals easily. Kilkenny sought to counteract this and decided to go for points rather than goals. Because of this, an early feature of the game was Kilkenny’s flair when scoring points from 30, 40 and 50 yards out from the goal. A titanic first-half struggle saw Kilkenny retire at half-time with a 0-7 to 0-3 lead over the champions.

=== Second half ===
The spectators looked forward to more of the same immediately after the restart. Cork made some defensive changes immediately. Jack Lynch moved to wing forward while Seán Condon went to midfield. These changes helped Cork to claw their way back, however, Kilkenny were still on top. With the game entering the final ten minutes Terry Leahy gathered a pressured clearance by the Cork ‘keeper and duly sent it straight between the posts from 30 yards for a two-point lead. At this stage the spectators were on their feet as a grandstand finish was in prospect. Cork were soon awarded a side-line cut which Jim Young stepped up to take. Young sent the sliotar goal wards via Connie Murphy towards Mossy O'Riordan who sent the sliotar in low to the Kilkenny net. This score gave Cork a one-point lead for the first time in the match.

A Kilkenny point by Tom Walton made the sides all level once again, just before Terry Leahy sent over a point to allow Kilkenny reclaim the lead. A huge burst of applause and cheering broke out amongst the Kilkenny supporters when Leahy sent over another point shortly to give ‘the Cats’ a two-point lead, as many thought that he had sealed the victory with the vital score. The game was not over yet. A hectic melee in the Kilkenny goalmouth occurred with the game entering the dying minutes. Joe Kelly, a young clerical student, was at hand to dispatch the ball into the Kilkenny net to give Cork a one-point lead for the first time. A long clearance immediately after that score found Jim Langton who was fouled about 30 yards out from the Cork goal. Leahy stepped up to take the resultant free as Croke Park descended from a state of frenzy to one of silence. The free posed no problem for the star attacker who levelled the sides with a well-taken point. The puck-out by ‘keeper Tom Mulcahy came back almost immediately and the much vaunted Cork defenders found it difficult to clear their lines. The sliotar reached Tom Mulcahy whose clearance fell to the eponymous Terry Leahy. From 30 yards out he sent the ball straight over the bar as time was almost up. Jack Lynch had a chance to equalise for Cork, however, he was hooked twice and the game was over.

A 0-14 to 2-7 score line gave Kilkenny their first All-Ireland since 1939 and their last until 1957.

== Statistics ==
7 September 1947
15:15 IST

Kilkenny	0-14 – 2-7	Cork
T. Leahy (0-6); J. Langton (0-3); T. Walton (0-2); S. Downey (0-1); J. Mulcahy (0-1); L. Reidy (0-1).		J. Kelly (1-1); S. Condon (0-4); M. O'Riordan (1-0); J. Lynch (0-1); C. Ring (0-1).

Croke Park, Dublin
Attendance: 61,510
Referee: Phil Purcell (Tipperary)

Kilkenny	Cork

GK	1	Jim Donegan
RCB	2	Paddy Grace
FB	3	Pat Hayden
LCB	4	Mark Marnell
RWB	5	Jimmy Kelly
CB	6	Peter Prendergast
LWB	7	Jack Mulcahy
MD	8	Dan Kennedy (c)
MD	9	Jimmy Heffernan
RWF	10	Tom Walton
CF	11	Terry Leahy
LWF	12	Jim Langton
RCF	13	Shem Downey
FF	14	Willie Cahill
LCF	15	Liam Reidy

GK	1	Tom Mulcahy
RCB	2	Willie Murphy
FB	3	Con Murphy
LCB	4	Din Joe Buckley
RWB	5	Paddy O'Donovan
CB	6	Alan Lotty
LWB	7	Jim Young
MD	8	Jack Lynch
MD	9	Con Cottrell
RWF	10	S. Condon (c)
CF	11	Christy Ring
LWF	12	Con Murphy
RCF	13	Mossy O'Riordan
FF	14	Gerry O'Riordan
LCF	15	Joe Kelly
