= 1944 All-Ireland Senior Hurling Championship final =

1944 All-Ireland Senior Hurling Final
- Event: 1944 All-Ireland Senior Hurling Championship
Cork	Dublin
2–13	1–2
- Date: 3 September 1944
- Venue: Croke Park, Dublin
- Referee: M. Hennessy (Clare)
- Attendance: 26,896

The 1944 All-Ireland Senior Hurling Championship Final was the 57th All-Ireland Final and the culmination of the 1944 All-Ireland Senior Hurling Championship, an inter-county hurling tournament for the top teams in Ireland. The match was held at Croke Park, Dublin, on 3 September 1944, between Cork and Dublin. The Leinster champions lost to their Munster opponents on a score line of 2–13 to 1–2.

This was Cork's fourth All-Ireland title in succession.

== All-Ireland final ==
=== Overview ===
Sunday 3 September was the date of the 1944 All-Ireland senior hurling final between Dublin and Cork. It was Cork's fourth consecutive appearance in the championship decider in-a-row, while Dublin last played in the All-Ireland final in 1942 when they were defeated by Cork.

On that occasion the fifteen members of the Cork team were one game away from uniqueness. The All-Ireland final was a game that would set them apart from all other great hurling teams in the past and in the future as no other county had won four All-Ireland hurling titles in-a-row. Cork achieved their first treble in 1894 while Tipperary and Kilkenny followed suit in 1900 and 1913 respectively. On a damp September afternoon in 1944 Cork were out to break all records.

=== Match report ===
With the pre-match festivities completed the game began at 3:15pm. Wartime travel restrictions meant that the attendance was just below 27,000, while a damp day resulted in a heavy sod under foot. The opening ten minutes did not go Cork's way as many commentators had anticipated. Dublin, with a host of household names on their team held the champions scoreless during the opening ten-minute tussle. It was left the Jack Lynch, Cork's dual player, to open the scores with a point. Seán Condon, the young team captain, stretched Cork's lead soon afterwards when he rifled over another three points for his team. Christy Ring was the third Cork player to get his name on the score sheet when he sent over his first point of the day. This point was soon followed by a Con Cottrell effort that also sailed over the bar to stretch Cork's lead even further. Cork's final two points of the opening thirty minutes came from midfielder Jack Lynch, the man who opened Cork's scoring account. Dublin's scoring efforts throughout the opening half only yielded two points, resulting in a 0–8 to 0–2 lead for ‘the Rebels’ at the interval.

After the restart Cork really took control of the game. Joe Kelly, the Irish sprint champion, gave some dazzling displays with exceptional solo runs. He opened Cork's scoring account after the interval with a quick goal that was shortly followed by a point. Dublin staged a brief rally that resulted in a goal by Charlie Downes. ‘The Dubs’ didn't give up, however, their many further attempts on the Cork goal were saved by Tom Mulcahy. These saves gave Cork a lift and the Dublin comeback was aborted. At the other end of the field Joe Kelly was still producing some dazzling solo runs while also capturing Cork's second goal of the game. Johnny Quirke and Jim Morrisson tacked on a few more points for Cork, however, by this stage the game was far beyond Dublin's reach. At the final whistle Cork were declared the winners by 2–13 to 1–2.

Joe Kelly and Tom Mulcahy were regarded by the public as the heroes of the team and were duly chaired off the field. Seán Condon later became the fourth Cork player in as many years to collect the Liam MacCarthy Cup. Nine players set a record by collecting their fourth consecutive All-Ireland medals; Jack Lynch, Willie Murphy, Batt Thornhill, Alan Lotty, Johnny Quirke, Christy Ring, Din Joe Buckley, Jim Young and Paddy O'Donovan.

=== Details ===
3 September 1944
15:15 IST

Cork	2–13 – 1–2	Dublin

Croke Park, Dublin
Attendance: 26,896
Referee: M. Hennessy (Clare)

Cork	Dublin

CORK:
GK	1	Tom Mulcahy
RCB	2	Willie ‘Long Puck’ Murphy
FB	3	Batt Thornhill
LCB	4	Din Joe Buckley
RWB	5	Paddy O'Donovan
CB	6	Con Murphy	Substituted off
LWB	7	Alan Lotty
M	8	Jack Lynch
M	9	Con Cottrell
RWF	10	Christy Ring
CF	11	Seán Condon (c)
LWF	12	Jim Young
RCF	13	Johnny Quirke
FF	14	Jim Morrison
LCF	15	Joe Kelly
Substitutes:
CB		Paddy ‘Hitler’ Healy	Substituted in

DUBLIN:
GK	1	Jim Donegan
RCB	2	Jimmy O'Neill
FB	3	Mick Butler (c)
LCB	4	Paddy McCormack
RWB	5	Frank White
CB	6	Clem Flanagan
LWB	7	Jim Egan	Substituted off
M	8	Mick Hassett
M	9	Harry Gray
RWF	10	Terry Leahy
CF	11	Ned Wade
LWF	12	Jim Byrne
RCF	13	Paddy Maher
FF	14	Charlie Downes
LCF	15	Mick Ryan
Substitutes:
LWB		Mick Gill, Jnr	Substituted in

Match Rules

- 60 minutes.
- Replay if scores level.
