= Paddy O'Donovan =

Irish hurler

Personal information
- Native name: Páidí Ó Donnabháin (Irish)
- Born: 15 March 1916 Watercourse Road, Cork, Ireland
- Died: 11 June 1990 (aged 74) Wellington Road, Cork, Ireland
- Height: 5 ft 10 in (178 cm)

Sport
- Sport: Hurling
- Position: Right wing-back
Club
- Years: Club
- 1937–1950: Glen Rovers
Club titles
- Cork titles: 10
Inter-county
Years	County	Apps (scores)
1938–1949	Cork	29 (0–01)
Inter-county titles
- Munster titles: 6
- All-Irelands: 5
- NHL: 1

Patrick Joseph O'Donovan (15 March 1916 – 11 June 1990) was an Irish hurler who played as a right corner-back for the Cork senior team.

O'Donovan joined the team during the 1938 championship and was a regular member of the starting fifteen until his retirement after the 1949 championship. During that time he won five All-Ireland medals, six Munster medals and one National League medal. O'Donovan was an All-Ireland runner-up on one occasion.

At club level O'Donovan was a ten-time county club championship medalist with Glen Rovers.

== Playing career ==
=== Club ===
O'Donovan played his club hurling with the famous Glen Rovers and enjoyed much success during a golden age for the club.

He made his senior debut in 1937 as the Glen were in the throes of dominating club hurling in Cork. Having been granted a walkover by the same opposition two years earlier, Glen Rovers faced Carrigtwohill in the county decider of 1937. The dominance continued and a 3–5 to 1–0 score line gave O'Donovan a Cork Senior Hurling Championship medal.

In 1938 Glen Rovers set out to make history by besting Blackrock's twenty-five-year-old championship record. Midleton stood in the way of a fifth successive championship title, however, a comprehensive 5–6 o 1–3 score line secured the victory and gave O'Donovan his second championship.

The success continued once again the following year as Glen Rovers faced Blackrock in their first championship decider meeting in almost a decade. A 5–4 to 2–5 win for the Glen gave O'Donovan a third successive championship medal.

Sarsfield's stood in the way of Glen Rovers securing a seventh successive championship in 1940. In one of the most high-scoring county finals of all time, O'Donovan won his fourth championship medal following a 10–6 to 7–5 defeat of Sars.

In 1941 Glen Rovers reached an eighth successive decider. In a game that set them apart from all other teams, the Glen continued their stranglehold of club hurling in Cork by claiming the victory following a 4–7 to 2–2 defeat of Ballincollig. O'Donovan won his fifth championship medal that day.

Nine-in-a-row proved beyond the team and Glen Rovers released their grip on club hurling in Cork for a few of years.

In 1944 the Glen were back in the county final once again. A 5–7 to 3–3 defeat of three-in-a-row hopefuls St. Finbarr's gave O'Donovan a sixth championship medal.

The Glen made it two-in-a-row in 1945 with O'Donovan adding a seventh championship medal to his collection as divisional side Carrigdhoun were bested by 4–10 to 5–3. He was also captain of the team.

After an absence of two years Glen Rovers were back in the county final again in 1948. A 5–7 to 3–2 victory gave O'Donovan his eighth championship medal. In 1949 O'Donovan played in yet another county decider. Divisional side Imokilly were out to cause a shock, and an exciting game unfolded. A 6–5 to 0–14 score line gave O'Donovan his ninth championship medal.

The Glen's dominance continued in 1950 as O'Donovan lined out in an eleventh and final championship decider. Fierce south side rivals St. Finbarr's provided he opposition, however, a convincing 2–8 to 0–5 victory gave O'Donovan his tenth championship medal. He retired from club hurling following this victory.

=== Inter-county ===
O'Donovan made his senior debut for Cork in a Munster quarter-final defeat of Limerick in 1938. Although Cork were defeated in the championship on that occasion, the team was about to enter a golden age.

In 1939 O'Donovan was include don the starting fifteen again as Cork made a breakthrough in the provincial championship after nearly a decade in the doldrums. A narrow 4–3 to 3–4 defeat of Limerick gave Cork the title and gave O'Donovan his first Munster medal. He played no part in Cork's subsequent defeat by Kilkenny in the All-Ireland decider.

An outbreak of foot and mouth disease severely hampered the 1941 championship. As a result of this Cork were nominated to represent the province in the All-Ireland series. O'Donovan started as a substitute in the final against Dublin but was introduced during the game. In a one-sided affair goals by Johnny Quirke and Ted O'Sullivan helped Cork to a 5–11 to 0–6 victory. It was one of the most one-sided championship deciders of all time, however, it did give O'Donovan an All-Ireland medal.

O'Donovan added a second Munster medal to his collection in 1942 as Tipperary were downed by 4–15 to 4–1. The All-Ireland final was a replay of the previous year with Dublin providing the opposition once again. The game was a close affair with just a point separating the sides at the three-quarter stage. In the end Cork won comfortably enough by 2–14 to 3–4 and O'Donovan collected a second All-Ireland medal.

A 2–13 to 3–8 defeat of Waterford in 1943 gave O'Donovan a third Munster medal. He was subsequently dropped from the starting fifteen for the All-Ireland decider against Antrim. Cork built up an unassailable 3–11 to 0–2 half-time lead over Antrim, and O'Donovan came on as a substitute as Cork powered to a 5–16 to 0–4 victory. It was O'Donovan's third All-Ireland medal.

In 1944, Cork were attempting to capture a fourth All-Ireland title in-a-row. No team in the history of the hurling championship had won more than three consecutive titles. The year got off to a good start when Cork defeated Limerick by 4–6 to 3–6 after a replay to give O'Donovan, who came on as a substitute, a fourth Munster medal. For the third time in four years Cork faced Dublin in an All-Ireland decider. Joe Kelly was the hero of the day and he contributed greatly to Cork's 2–13 to 1–2 victory. It was a fourth successive All-Ireland medal for O'Donovan who started the game in the half-back line.

Five-in-a-row proved to be a bridge too far for Cork, however, the team returned in 1946. A 3–8 to 1–3 defeat of Limerick gave O'Donovan his fifth Munster medal. Under the captaincy of Christy Ring, Cork subsequently faced old rivals Kilkenny in the All-Ireland final. While some had written off Cork's chances, they took an interval lead of four points. With ten minutes remaining Cork's lead was reduced to just two points, however, goals by Mossy O'Riordan and Joe Kelly secured the victory. A 7–6 to 3–8 score line gave O'Donovan a fifth All-Ireland medal.

Cork retained their provincial dominance in 1947 with O'Donovan picking up a sixth winners' medal following a three-point victory over Limerick. The All-Ireland final was a repeat of the previous year with Kilkenny providing the opposition. The stakes were high for both sides as Cork were aiming for a record sixth championship in seven seasons while Kilkenny were aiming to avoid becoming the first team to lose three consecutive All-Ireland finals. In what has been described as one of the greatest deciders of all time, little separated the two teams over the course if the hour. A Joe Kelly goal put Cork one point ahead with time almost up, however, Terry Leahy proved to be the hero of the day. He converted a free to level the sides again before sending over the match-winner from the subsequent puck-out. With that the game was over and O'Donovan's side were beaten by 0–14 to 2–7. It was the fifth time that Kilkenny had pipped Cork by a single point in an All-Ireland final.

O'Donovan won a National Hurling League medal at the start of 1948 following a 3–3 to 1–2 defeat of Tipperary. Cork later faced a one-point defeat by Waterford in the provincial decider.

A thrilling Munster quarter-final replay defeat by Tipperary in 1949 brought the curtain down on O'Donovan's inter-county career.

=== Inter-provincial ===
O'Donovan also had the honour of being selected for Munster in the inter-provincial series of games. He made his debut with the province in 1945 and was a regular at various times until his retirement in 1949.

Having joined the team at a time of great success, O'Donovan lined out in his first inter-provincial decider in 1945. A 6–8 to 2–0 demolition of Ulster gave him a Railway Cup medal.

After a number of years off the team, O'Donovan and Munster returned to the final again in 1948. A 3–5 to 2–5 defeat of Leinster gave him his second Railway Cup medal. Connacht were narrowly defeated the following year to give O'Donovan a third and final winners' medal.

== Death ==
On 11 June 1990, O'Donovan died aged 74 at Marymount Hospice in Cork after suffering a period of illness.

== Honours ==
=== Team ===
Glen Rovers

- Cork Senior Club Hurling Championship (10): 1937, 1938, 1939, 1940, 1941, 1944, 1945 (c), 1948, 1949, 1950

Cork

- All-Ireland Senior Hurling Championship (5): 1941, 1942, 1943, 1944, 1946
- Munster Senior Hurling Championship (5): 1939, 1942, 1943, 1944, 1946, 1947
- National Hurling League (1): 1947–48

Munster

- Railway Cup (3): 1945, 1948, 1949
