= Jim Young (dual player) =

Irish hurler and Gaelic footballer

Personal information
- Native name: Séamus de Siún (Irish)
- Nickname: Youngie
- Born: 16 October 1915 Dunmanway, County Cork, Ireland
- Died: 23 August 1992 (aged 76) Cork, Ireland
- Occupation: Medical doctor
- Height: 5 ft 8 in (173 cm)

Sport
- Football Position: Full-forward
- Hurling Position: Midfield
Clubs
- Years: Club
- Glen Rovers; Dohenys; Clonakilty; Carbery
Club titles
	Football	Hurling
Cork titles	0	8
Inter-county
Years	County	Apps (scores)
1939–1943 1938–1949	Cork (F); Cork (H)	6 (2–7); 39 (5–6)
Inter-county titles
	Football	Hurling
Munster Titles	0	6
All-Ireland Titles	0	5
League titles	0	3

James Edward Young (16 October 1915 – 23 August 1992) was an Irish hurler and Gaelic footballer who played in various positions for the Cork senior teams.

Young was born in Dunmanway in 1915. He completed his primary education in the town before moving to St Finbarr's College, Farranferris, where he developed his hurling skills. He then spent a number of years in Maynooth before returning to University College Cork, where he studied medicine.

Young made his first appearance for the senior hurling team during the 1938 championship and was a regular member of the starting fifteen until his retirement after the 1949 championship. During that time he won five All-Ireland Senior Hurling Championship (SHC) medals, six Munster SHC medals and three National Hurling League medals. Young was an All-Ireland SHC runner-up on two occasions.

At club level Young was an eight-time county hurling championship medalist with Glen Rovers. He also played football at club level with Dohenys.

Young's father, Jack, and his brother Éamonn, were All-Ireland medalists in football with Cork.

== Playing career ==
=== Club ===
Young played his club hurling with Glen Rovers and had several title wins with the club.

In 1938, Young joined the senior team as Glen Rovers set out to make history by besting Blackrock's twenty-five-year-old championship record of winning successive titles. Midleton stood in the way of a fifth successive championship title, however, a comprehensive 5–6 o 1–3 score line secured the victory and gave Young his first championship medal.

The success continued once again the following year as Glen Rovers faced Blackrock in their first championship decider meeting in almost a decade. A 5–4 to 2–5 win for the Glen gave Young a second successive championship medal.

Sarsfield's stood in the way of Glen Rovers securing a seventh successive championship in 1940. In one of the most high-scoring county finals of all-time, Young won his third championship medal following a 10–6 to 7–5 defeat of Sars.

In 1941 Glen Rovers reached an eighth successive decider. In a game that set them apart from all other teams, the team continued their stranglehold of club hurling in Cork by claiming the victory following a 4–7 to 2–2 defeat of Ballincollig. It was a fourth successive championship medal for Young. Nine-in-a-row proved beyond Glen Rovers and a defeat by Ballincollig in the championship semi-final brought the teams great run of success to an end.

In 1944 the Glen were back in the county final once again. A 5–7 to 3–3 defeat of three-in-a-row hopefuls St Finbarr's gave Young a fifth championship medal.

The Glen made it two-in-a-row in 1945 with Young adding a sixth championship medal to his collection as divisional side Carrigdhoun were bested by 4–10 to 5–3.

After an absence of two years Glen Rovers were back in the county final again in 1948. A 5–7 to 3–2 victory gave Young his seventh championship medal.

In his final season with the Glen Rovers senior team, Young played in a ninth county decider. Divisional side Imokilly were out to cause a shock; however, and an exciting game unfolded. A 6–5 to 0–14 score line gave Young his eighth and final championship medal.

=== Inter-county ===
Young first came to prominence on the inter-county scene as a member of the Cork minor hurling team in 1932. He spent two years in that grade; however, Cork failed in their championship hopes.

In 1938, Young made his senior championship debut for Cork. Although that year's campaign ended in defeat Cork were about to make a breakthrough the following year after a decade in the doldrums. A narrow 4–3 to 3–4 defeat of Limerick gave Cork the title and gave Young his first Munster SHC medal. The subsequent All-Ireland SHC final pitted Cork against Kilkenny. In one of the most iconic championship deciders of all-time, played on the day that the Second World War broke out, the climax of which was played in a ferocious thunder storm. While a draw looked likely as the hour drew to a close Paddy Phelan sent a seventy-yard free in towards the Cork goalmouth. The sliotar was gobbled up by the defence and cleared, but only as far as Jimmy Kelly who sent it straight over the bar for a one-point lead. Immediately after the puck-out the referee blew the whistle and Cork were defeated by a scoreline of 2–7 to 3–3.

Although defeated in the All-Ireland SHC decider, Cork continued their breakthrough in 1940. An 8–9 to 6–4 defeat of Tipperary in the decider gave Toung his first National Hurling League medal. He added a second winners' medal to his collection in 1941 following a defeat of Dublin.

A foot in mouth outbreak severely hampered the 1941 championship. As a result of this Cork were nominated to represent the province in the All-Ireland SHC. Young lined out in the final against Dublin; however, it turned into a one-sided affair thanks to contributing goals from Johnny Quirke and Ted O'Sullivan. At the full-time whistle Cork had won by 5–11 to 0–6. It was one of the most one-sided championship deciders of all-time; however, it did give Young an All-Ireland SHC medal.

Young added a Munster SHC medal to his collection in 1942 as Tipp were downed by 4–15 to 4–1. The All-Ireland SHC final was a replay of the previous year with Dublin providing the opposition once again. The game was a close affair with just a point separating the sides at the three-quarter stage. In the end Cork won by 2–14 to 3–4 and Young collected a second All-Ireland SHC medal.

A 2–13 to 3–8 defeat of Waterford in 1943 gave Young a third Munster SHC medal. He later lined out in a fourth All-Ireland SHC decider, with Antrim becoming the first Ulster side to qualify for a final. Cork built up an unassailable 3–11 to 0–2 half-time lead over Antrim and the final score of 5–16 to 0–4 gave Cork their second-ever hat-trick of All-Ireland SHC titles and gave Young a third All-Ireland SHC medal.

In 1944, Cork were attempting to capture an unprecedented fourth All-Ireland SHC title in-a-row. No team in the history of the hurling championship had won more than three consecutive titles. The year got off to a good start when Cork defeated Limerick by 4–6 to 3–6 after a replay to give Young a fourth Munster SHC medal. For the third time in four years Cork faced Dublin in an All-Ireland SHC decider. Joe Kelly was the hero of the day and he contributed greatly to Cork's 2–13 to 1–2 victory. It was a fourth successive All-Ireland SHC medal for Young.

Five-in-a-row proved to be a bridge too far for Cork; however, the team returned in 1946. A 3–8 to 1–3 defeat of Limerick gave Young his fifth Munster SHC medal. Under the captaincy of Christy Ring, Cork subsequently faced old rivals Kilkenny in the All-Ireland SHC final. While some had written off Cork's chances, they took an interval lead of four points. With ten minutes remaining Cork's lead was reduced to just two points; however, goals by Mossy O'Riordan and Joe Kelly secured the victory. A 7–6 to 3–8 score line gave Young a fifth and final All-Ireland SHC medal.

Cork retained their provincial dominance in 1947 with Young picking up a sixth winners' medal following a three-point victory over Limerick. The All-Ireland SHC final was a repeat of the previous year, with Kilkenny providing the opposition. The stakes were high for both sides as Cork were aiming for a record sixth championship in seven seasons while Kilkenny were aiming to avoid becoming the first team to lose three consecutive All-Ireland SHC finals. In what has been described as one of the greatest deciders of all-time, little separated the two teams over the course if the hour. A Joe Kelly goal put Cork one point ahead with time almost up; however, Terry Leahy proved to be the hero of the day. He converted a free to level the sides again before sending over the match-winner from the subsequent puck-out. With that the game was over and Young's side were beaten by 0–14 to 2–7. It was the fifth time that Kilkenny had pipped Cork by a single point in an All-Ireland SHC final.

Young won a third National League medal at the start of 1948, following a 3–3 to 1–2 defeat of Tipperary. Cork later faced a one-point defeat by Waterford in the provincial decider.

A Munster SHC quarter-final replay defeat by Tipperary in 1949 brought the curtain down on Young's inter-county career.

=== Inter-provincial ===
Young also had the honour of being selected for Munster in the inter-provincial series of games. He made his debut with the province in 1942 and was a regular until his retirement in 1947.

He won his first Railway Cup medal as a non-playing sub in 1942, however, he would be a member of the starting fifteen as the province went on to dominate the rest of the decade. Defeats of Leinster (1943), Connacht (1944) and Ulster (1945, 1946) gave Young four successive Railway Cup medals on the field of play.

== Post-playing career ==
In retirement from hurling, Young maintained an interested in the game and in other sports. He became Munster squash champion and served as non-playing captain of the Irish Davis Cup tennis team in 1967. Young also served as president of the Irish Rifle Association for several years.

== Death ==
On 23 August 1992, Young died aged 76 at his home in Cork, survived by his wife, two sons and two daughters. After the news of his death, leading figures from the world of hurling paid tribute to him. In delivering his graveside oration, former club and county teammate John Lyons said: "When he played with Cork, he was part of a team that had Christy Ring, Jack Lynch and a host of other great players. But, he shone like a beacon even in that galaxy of stars".

== Honours ==
=== Team ===
University College Cork

- Fitzgibbon Cup (2): 1938–39, 1939–40

Glen Rovers

- Cork Senior Club Hurling Championship (8): 1938, 1939, 1940, 1941, 1944, 1945, 1948, 1949

Cork

- All-Ireland Senior Hurling Championship (5): 1941, 1942, 1943, 1944, 1946
- Munster Senior Hurling Championship (6): 1939, 1942, 1943, 1944, 1946, 1947
- National Hurling League (3): 1939–40, 1940–41, 1947–48

Munster

- Railway Cup (5): 1942 (sub), 1943, 1944, 1945, 1946

Sporting positions
Preceded by Tom Mulcahy	Cork Senior Hurling Captain; 1949	Succeeded by Christy Ring
