= Tom Mulcahy =

Irish hurler

Personal information
- Native name: Tomás Ó Maolcatha (Irish)
- Born: 10 January 1923 Cork, Ireland
- Died: 9 November 2009 (aged 86) Cork, Ireland
- Occupation: Plumber
- Height: 5 ft 0 in (152 cm)

Sport
- Sport: Hurling
- Position: Goalkeeper
Club
- Years: Club
- St Finbarr's
Club titles
- Cork titles: 4
Inter-county
Years	County	Apps (scores)
1943–1950	Cork	25 (0-00)
Inter-county titles
- Munster titles: 4
- All-Irelands: 3
- NHL: 1

Thomas J. Mulcahy (10 January 1923 – 9 November 2009) was an Irish hurler who played as a goalkeeper at senior level for the Cork county team.

Mulcahy made his first appearance for the team during the 1943 championship and was a regular member of the starting fifteen until his retirement following the conclusion of the 1950 championship. During that time he won three All-Ireland medals, four Munster medals and one National League medal. Mulcahy was an All-Ireland runner-up on one occasion.

At club level Mulcahy was a four-time county senior championship medalist with St Finbarr's.

== Playing career ==
=== Club ===
Mulcahy played his club hurling with St Finbarr's and had much success.

He first played for the "Barr's" club in the minor grade and collected three successive championship medals in that grade between 1939 and 1941.

In 1942 Mulcahy played in his first senior county final with "the Barr's". Ballincollig, a team who had defeated nine-in-a-row hopefuls Glen Rovers in the semi-final, provided the opposition. St Finbarr's made no mistake and powered to a 5–7 to 2–2. In a changing of the guard, Mulcahy came on as a substitute for regular 'keeper Jim Buttimer to collect his first championship medal on the field of play.

Both St Finbarr's and Ballincollig met in the championship decider again the following year. A 3–3 apiece draw, thanks to a late goal by Seán Condon, was the result on that occasion; however, St Finbarr's made no mistake in the replay and powered to a 7–9 to 1–1 victory. It was Mulcahy's second and final championship medal.

Three-in-a-row proved beyond St Finbarr's as Glen Rovers claimed victory in the championship decider in 1944. Both sides lined out in opposition to each other again two years later. Mulcahy collected a third championship medal following a 2–3 to 2–1 defeat of their north side rivals.

Twelve months later St Finbarr's put their title on the line against Sarsfield's in the county decider. A record crowd saw "Sars" lead "the Barr's" by a single point as the game entered injury time. They failed to clear a seventy which was flicked to the net by Jim Sargent to give St Finbarr's a 4–6 to 4–4 victory. It was Mulcahy's fourth and final championship medal.

=== Inter-county ===
Mulcahy first came to prominence on the inter-county scene as a member of the Cork minor hurling team in 1941. He won a Munster medal that year following a 4–6 to 3–3 defeat of Tipperary. He later lined out in an All-Ireland decider against Kilkenny. A 5–2 to 2–2 score line gave Cork the victory and gave Mulcahy an All-Ireland Minor Hurling Championship medal.

Two years later in 1943, Mulcahy took over as first-choice goalkeeper with the Cork senior team. A 2–13 to 3–8 defeat of Waterford that year gave him his first Munster medal. He later lined out in his first All-Ireland decider with Antrim becoming the first Ulster side to qualify for a final. Cork built up an unassailable 3–11 to 0–2 half-time lead over Antrim, and the final score of 5–16 to 0–4 gave Cork their second-ever hat-trick of All-Ireland titles and gave Mulcahy a first All-Ireland medal.

In 1944, Cork were attempting to capture a fourth All-Ireland title in-a-row. No team in the history of the hurling championship had won more than three consecutive titles. The year got off to a good start when Cork defeated Limerick by 4–6 to 3–6 after a replay to give Mulcahy a second Munster medal. For the third time in four years Cork faced Dublin in an All-Ireland decider. Joe Kelly was the hero of the day and he contributed greatly to Cork's 2–13 to 1–2 victory. It was a second All-Ireland medal for Mulcahy.

Five-in-a-row proved to be a bridge too far for Cork, however, the team returned in 1946. A 3–8 to 1–3 defeat of Limerick gave Mulcahy his third Munster medal. Under the captaincy of Christy Ring, Cork subsequently faced old rivals Kilkenny in the All-Ireland final. While some had written off Cork's chances, they took an interval lead of four points. With ten minutes remaining Cork's lead was reduced to just two points, however, goals by Mossy O'Riordan and Joe Kelly secured the victory. A 7–6 to 3–8 score line gave Mulcahy a third All-Ireland medal.

Cork retained their provincial dominance in 1947 with Mulcahy picking up a fourth winners' medal following a three-point victory over Limerick. The All-Ireland final was a repeat of the previous year with Kilkenny providing the opposition. The stakes were high for both sides as Cork were aiming for a record sixth championship in seven seasons while Kilkenny were aiming to avoid becoming the first team to lose three consecutive All-Ireland finals. In what has been described as one of the greatest deciders of all-time, little separated the two teams over the course if the hour. A Joe Kelly goal put Cork one point ahead with time almost up, however, Terry Leahy proved to be the hero of the day. He converted a free to level the sides again before sending over the match-winner from the subsequent puck-out. With that the game was over and Mulcahy's side were beaten by 0–14 to 2–7. It was the fifth time that Kilkenny had pipped Cork by a single point in an All-Ireland final.

Mulcahy won a National Hurling League medal at the start of 1948 following a 3–3 to 1–2 defeat of Tipperary. Cork later faced a one-point defeat by Waterford in the provincial decider.

After back-to-back championship exits at the hands of Tipperary in 1949 and 1950, Mulcahy decided to retire from inter-county hurling.

=== Inter-provincial ===
Mulcahy also had the honour of being selected for Munster in the inter-provincial series of games. He made his debut with the province in 1947 and was a regular until his retirement in 1949.

After being shocked by Connacht in 1947, Munster reached the inter-provincial decider again the following year. A narrow 3–5 to 2–5 defeat of arch-rivals Leinster gave Mulcahy his first Railway Cup medal. Connacht were accounted for by 5–3 to 2–9 the following year to give Mulcahy a second winners' medal in the competition.

== Honours ==
St Finbarr's

- Cork Senior Hurling Championship (3): 1942, 1943, 1946, 1947

Cork

- All-Ireland Senior Hurling Championship (3): 1943, 1944, 1946
- Munster Senior Hurling Championship (4): 1943, 1944, 1946, 1947
- National Hurling League (1): 1947–48
- All-Ireland Minor Hurling Championship (1): 1941
- Munster Minor Hurling Championship (1): 1941

Munster

- Railway Cup (2): 1948, 1949

Sporting positions
Preceded by Seán Condon	Cork Senior Hurling Captain; 1948	Succeeded by Jim Young
