= Din Joe Buckley =

Irish hurler

Personal information
- Native name: D. S. Ó Buachalla (Irish)
- Born: 19 March 1919 Blackpool, Cork, Ireland
- Died: 8 October 2009 (aged 90) Cork, Ireland
- Height: 5 ft 8 in (173 cm)

Sport
- Sport: Hurling
- Position: Left corner-back
Club
- Years: Club
- 1938–1949: Glen Rovers / St. Nicholas's
Club titles
- Cork titles: 8
Inter-county
Years	County	Apps (scores)
1940–1949	Cork	27 (0–3)
Inter-county titles
- Munster titles: 4
- All-Irelands: 5
- NHL: 2

Denis Joseph "Din Joe" Buckley (19 March 1919 – 8 October 2009) was an Irish hurler who played as a left corner-back for the Cork senior team.

Buckley made his first appearance for the team during the 1940 championship and was a regular member of the starting fifteen until his retirement after the 1949 championship. During that time he won five All-Ireland medal, four Munster medals and two National League medals. Buckley was an All-Ireland runner-up on one occasion.

At club level Buckley was an eight-time county club championship medalist with Glen Rovers.

His brother Connie was an All-Ireland-winning captain and another brother, Jack, was an All-Ireland medalist as a non-playing substitute in 1942.

== Playing career ==
=== Club ===
Buckley played his club hurling with the Glen Rovers and in 1938 he joined the club's senior team as the club set out to make history by besting Blackrock's twenty-five-year-old championship record of successive titles. Midleton stood in the way of a fifth successive championship title, however, a 5–6 to 1–3 score line secured the victory and gave Buckley his first championship.

The following year Glen Rovers faced Blackrock in their first championship decider meeting in almost a decade. A 5–4 to 2–5 win for the Glen gave Buckley a second successive championship medal.

Sarsfield's stood in the way of Glen Rovers securing a seventh successive championship in 1940. In one of the most high-scoring county finals of all-time, Buckley won his third championship medal following a 10–6 to 7–5 defeat of Sars.

In 1941 Glen Rovers reached an eighth successive decider, and the Glen claimed victory following a 4–7 to 2–2 defeat of Ballincollig. Buckley won his fourth successive championship medal on that occasion.

Nine-in-a-row proved beyond Glen Rovers and a defeat by Ballincollig in the championship semi-final brought an end to the club's run of success.

In 1944 Buckley was captain of the Glen Rovers senior team that qualified for the county final once again. A 5–7 to 3–3 defeat of three-in-a-row hopefuls gave him a fifth championship medal.

The Glen made it two-in-a-row in 1945 with Buckley adding a sixth championship medal to his collection as divisional side Carrigdhoun were bested by 4–10 to 5–3.

After an absence of two years Glen Rovers were back in the county final again in 1948. A 5–7 to 3–2 victory gave Buckley his seventh championship medal.

In his final season with the Glen Rovers senior team, Buckley played in a ninth county decider. Divisional side Imokilly were out to cause a shock. However, a 6–5 to 0–14 score line gave Buckley his eighth and final championship medal.

=== Inter-county ===
Buckley first came to prominence on the inter-county scene at a time when Cork were making a breakthrough after nearly a decade in the doldrums. An 8–9 to 6–4 defeat of Tipperary in the decider gave Buckley his first National Hurling League medal in 1940. He added a second winners' medal to his collection in 1941 following a defeat of Dublin.

An outbreak of foot and mouth disease hampered the 1941 championship, and Cork were nominated to represent the province in the All-Ireland series. Buckley lined out in the final against Dublin, however, it turned into a one-sided affair thanks to contributing goals from Johnny Quirke and Ted O'Sullivan. At the full-time whistle Cork had won by 5–11 to 0–6. It was one of the most one-sided championship deciders of all-time, however, it did give Buckley an All-Ireland medal.

Buckley added a Munster medal to his collection in 1942 as Tipp were downed by 4–15 to 4–1. The All-Ireland final was a replay of the previous year with Dublin providing the opposition once again. Cork ultimately won by 2–14 to 3–4 and Buckley collected a second All-Ireland medal.

After missing the provincial final defeat of Waterford, Buckley was back for the All-Ireland decider with Antrim becoming the first Ulster side to qualify for a final. Cork built up an unassailable 3–11 to 0–2 half-time lead over Antrim and the final score of 5–16 to 0–4 gave Cork their second-ever hat-trick of All-Ireland titles while it also gave Buckley a third All-Ireland medal.

In 1944, Cork were attempting to capture a fourth All-Ireland title in-a-row. No team in the history of the hurling championship had won more than three consecutive titles. The year got off to a good start when Cork defeated Limerick by 4–6 to 3–6 after a replay to give Buckley a second Munster medal. For the third time in four years Cork faced Dublin in an All-Ireland decider. Joe Kelly was the hero of the day and he contributed greatly to Cork's 2–13 to 1–2 victory. It was a fourth successive All-Ireland medal for Buckley.

Five-in-a-row proved to be a bridge too far for Cork, however, the team returned in 1946. A 3–8 to 1–3 defeat of Limerick gave Buckley his third Munster medal. Under the captaincy of Christy Ring, Cork subsequently faced Kilkenny in the All-Ireland final, in which goals by Mossy O'Riordan and Joe Kelly secured the victory. A 7–6 to 3–8 score line gave Buckley a fifth All-Ireland medal.

In 1947, Buckley picked up a fourth winners' medal following a three-point victory over Limerick. The All-Ireland final was a repeat of the previous year with Kilkenny providing the opposition. Buckley's side were beaten by 0–14 to 2–7. It was the fifth time that Kilkenny had pipped Cork by a single point in an All-Ireland final.

After being dropped from the panel in 1948, Buckley returned as an unused substitute in 1949. After Cork's championship exit at the first hurdle Buckley brought the curtain down on his inter-county career.

=== Inter-provincial ===
Murphy was selected for Munster in the inter-provincial series of games. He made his debut with the province in 1941 and was a regular until his retirement in 1943. During that time he won three successive Railway Cup medals as Leinster (twice) and Connacht were defeated.

== Honours ==
=== Team ===
Glen Rovers

- Cork Senior Club Hurling Championship (8): 1938, 1939, 1940, 1941, 1944 (c), 1945, 1948, 1949

Cork

- All-Ireland Senior Hurling Championship (5): 1941, 1942, 1943, 1944, 1946
- Munster Senior Hurling Championship (4): 1942, 1944, 1946, 1947
- National Hurling League (2): 1939–40, 1940–41

Munster

- Railway Cup (3): 1942, 1943, 1944
