= Batt Thornhill =

Irish hurler

Personal information
- Nickname: Batt
- Born: 1 January 1911 Carrigaline, County Cork, Ireland
- Died: 16 October 1970 (aged 59) Buttevant, County Cork, Ireland
- Occupation: Barber
- Height: 5 ft 10 in (178 cm)

Sport
- Sport: Hurling
- Position: Full-back
Clubs
- Years: Club
- Buttevant → Avondhu
Club titles
- Cork titles: 0
Inter-county
Years	County	Apps (scores)
1939-1944	Cork	22 (0-00)
Inter-county titles
- Munster titles: 4
- All-Irelands: 4
- NHL: 2

Bartholomew Thornhill (1 January 1911 – 16 October 1970), better known as Batt Thornhill, was an Irish hurler. A long-time member of the Buttevant club, he was also a four-time All-Ireland Championship winner with the Cork senior hurling team.

An All-Ireland medal winner at junior level, Thornhill was drafted onto the Cork senior team in 1939. From his debut, he quickly made the full-back position his own and made 22 championship appearances in a career that ended with his last game in 1944. During that time Thornhill was part of four All-Ireland Championship-winning teams as part of Cork's record-breaking four titles in-a-row between 1941 and 1944. He also secured four Munster Championships and two National League titles.

== Playing career ==
=== Buttevant ===
Thornhill first played for the Buttevant club at adult level in the late 1920s. A decade later he had assumed the captaincy of the Buttevant intermediate team and led the team to a meeting with Ballincollig in the 1940 Intermediate Championship final. Thornhill scored a goal from a 70-yard free and ended the game with a winners' medal after the 2-04 to 1-04 victory. He retired from club duty in 1952, having also lined out with divisional side Avondhu in the Senior Championship.

=== Cork ===
==== Junior ====
Thornhill first played for Cork when he was drafted onto the junior team during the 1933 Munster Junior Championship. He made his debut on 9 July 1933 when he lined out at full-back in Cork's 7-05 to 4-05 defeat of Clare but was left out of the team for the subsequent Munster final. Thornhill was recalled to the team for the 1934 Munster final against Waterford, but ended the game on the losing side after the 7-10 to 5-02 defeat.

After a number of years of no association with the team, Thornhill was restored to the full-back berth for the 1937 Munster Junior Championship. He won his first Munster Championship medal that season after Cork's 5-05 to 3-01 defeat of Limerick in the final.

Thornhill claimed a second successive Munster Championship medal following Cork's 7-05 to 4-00 victory over Clare in the 1938 Munster final replay. He was again selected at full-back when Cork faced London in the All-Ireland final and claimed a winner's medal after the 4-04 to 4-01 victory.

==== Senior ====
Thornhill's performances at junior level brought him to the attention of the senior selectors and he was drafted onto the team during the 1938-39 National League. He made his championship debut on 25 June 1939 in a 7-04 to 4-03 defeat of Waterford before later claiming his first Munster Championship medal after a 4-03 to 3-04 victory over Limerick in the final. On 3 September 1939, Thornhill lined out at full-back when Cork suffered a 2-07 to 3-03 defeat by Kilkenny in the "thunder and Lightning" All-Ireland final.

Thornhill claimed his first national silverware when Cork defeated Tipperary by 8-09 to 6-04 to win the 1939-40 National League title. He was again at full-back when Cork surrendered their provincial title to Limerick in the 1940 Munster final.

After winning a second successive National League medal after a 4-11 to 2-07 victory over Dublin in the 1941 league final, Thornhill lined out in the second All-Ireland final of his career on 28 September 1941 when he was selected at full-back against Dublin. He ended the game with his first All-Ireland medal after the 5-11 to 0-06 victory. Thornhill ended the season by lining out in Cork's 5-04 to 2-05 defeat by Tipperary in the delayed Munster final.

Thornhill lined out in a fourth successive Munster final the following year, with Cork claiming the title after a 4-15 to 4-01 defeat of Tipperary. He was again selected at full-back for the subsequent All-Ireland final against Dublin and collected his second successive All-Ireland winners' medal after a 2-14 to 3-04 victory.

After winning a third provincial championship medal after a 2-13 to 3-08 victory over Waterford in the 1943 Munster final, Thornhill subsequently lined out in a third successive All-Ireland final. He claimed a third successive winners' medal after the 5-16 to 0-04 victory over Antrim.

Thornhill claimed a third successive Munster Championship winners' medal - the fourth of his career - after a 4-06 to 3-06 victory over Limerick in the 1944 Munster final replay. On 3 September 1944, he again lined out at full-back in a fourth successive All-Ireland final appearance and ended the 2-13 to 1-02 victory over Dublin by becoming one of a select group of players to have won four successive All-Ireland medals. Thornhill retired from inter-county hurling following this victory.

=== Munster ===
Thornhill was first selected for the Munster team for the 1942 Railway Cup final. Lining out at full-back against Leinster, he ended the game with his first Railway Cup medal after the 4-09 to 4-05 victory. It was the first of three successive winners' medals for Thornhill, as he was also included on the team for the final victories over Leinster in 1943 and Connacht in 1944.

== Later life and death ==
In retirement from playing, Thornhill remained heavily involved in the administration and organisation of the Buttevant club. A new sportsfield was bought by Thornhill and a local clergyman and entrusted to the club. Thornhill also maintained his barber shop in the town.

Thornhill died from rectal cancer aged 59 on 16 October 1970. He was the first member of Cork's four-in-a-row side to die.

== Honours ==
Buttevant

- Cork Intermediate Hurling Championship (1): 1940

Cork

- All-Ireland Senior Hurling Championship (4): 1941, 1942, 1943, 1944
- Munster Senior Hurling Championship (4): 1939, 1942, 1943, 1944
- National Hurling League (2): 1939-40, 1940-41
- All-Ireland Junior Hurling Championship (1): 1938
- Munster Junior Hurling Championship (2): 1937, 1938

Munster

- Railway Cup (3): 1942, 1943, 1944
