= The record of the nine =

The record of the nine was a term used in hurling to refer to the nine men who held the record between 1944 and 2009 for winning four consecutive All-Ireland Senior Hurling Championship winners' medals. This occurred between 1941 and 1944 when Cork won the championship title every year. Only nine men played in all four finals, hence the record of the nine. These men were Din Joe Buckley, Alan Lotty, Jack Lynch, Willie Murphy, Paddy O'Donovan, Johnny Quirke, Christy Ring, Batt Thornhill and Dr. Jim Young.

Their record stood for 65 years in spite of some close calls in the interim. In 1952 Tipperary had won the three previous All-Ireland titles and looked set for a fourth consecutive triumph. They were eventually defeated by Cork in the Munster final that year. In 1979 Cork had also won the three previous All-Ireland titles. Their four-in-a-row dream came to a halt in the All-Ireland semi-final following a shock defeat by Galway.

One of the nine, Jack Lynch was also on the Cork football team that captured the 1945 All-Ireland Football Title. When Cork regained the All-Ireland Hurling title in 1946 Lynch gained his sixth All-Ireland medal in successive years (5 in hurling,1 in football), a unique achievement in Gaelic games.
