= Bill Walsh (hurler) =

Irish hurler

Personal information
- Native name: Liam Breathnach (Irish)
- Nickname: Willie
- Born: 1922 Ballyhale, County Kilkenny, Ireland
- Died: 26 March 2013 (aged 90) Rathcoole, County Dublin, Ireland
- Height: 5 ft 9 in (175 cm)

Sport
- Sport: Hurling
- Position: Left wing-back
Clubs
- Years: Club
- Carrickshock; Young Irelands
Club titles
- Kilkenny titles: 1
Inter-county
- Years: County
- 1944-1958: Kilkenny
Inter-county titles
- Leinster titles: 5
- All-Irelands: 2
- NHL: 0

William Walsh (1922 – 26 March 2013) was an Irish hurler who played as a left wing-back for the Kilkenny senior team.

Walsh joined the team during the 1944 championship and was a regular member of the starting fifteen until his retirement after the 1958 championship. During that time he won two All-Ireland medal and five Leinster medals. Walsh was an All-Ireland runner-up on four occasions.

At club level Walsh was a one-time Kilkenny club championship medalist with Carrickshock. He also won a Dublin club championship medal with Young Irelands.

== Playing career ==
=== Club ===
Walsh began his club hurling career with Carrickshock.

In 1942 he lined out in his first championship decider. A narrow 3–2 to 2–3 defeat of Threecastles gave Walsh a Kilkenny Senior Hurling Championship medal.

A move to Dublin saw Walsh join the Young Irelands club. In the twilight of his career in 1965 he lined out in yet another championship decider. University College Dublin provided the opposition on that occasion, however, Walsh won a second Championship medal.

=== Inter-county ===
Walsh first came to prominence on the inter-county scene as a member of the Kilkenny senior team in 1944.

In 1945 Walsh was a regular member of the starting fifteen and lined out in his first provincial decider. A comprehensive 5–12 to 3–4 defeat of Dublin gave him his first Leinster medal. The subsequent All-Ireland decider saw a bumper crowd of over 69,000 people turn up for the clash between Kilkenny and Tipperary. Walsh lost his place on the starting fifteen but was introduced as a substitute. After trailing by four goals at half-time, Kilkenny eventually lost by 5–6 to 3–6.

Walsh added a second Leinster medal to his collection in 1946 following another 3–8 to 1–12 defeat of Dublin. He subsequently started his first All-Ireland final as Cork provided the opposition. While some had written off Cork's chances, they took an interval lead of four points. With ten minutes remaining Cork's lead was reduced to just two points, however, goals by Mossy O'Riordan and Joe Kelly secured the victory. A 7–6 to 3–8 score line resulted in a second successive All-Ireland defeat for Kilkenny.

Kilkenny were the provincial kingpins for s third successive year in 1947. A 7–10 to 3–6 defeat of Dublin gave Walsh his third Leinster medal. The subsequent All-Ireland final was a repeat of the previous year, however due to injury, Walsh was dropped to the substitutes' bench for the showdown with Cork. In one of the greatest All-Ireland deciders of all time, Kilkenny triumphed by 0–14 to 2-7 and Walsh collected an All-Ireland medal as a non-playing substitute.

After surrendering their titles the following year, Walsh won a fourth Leinster medal in 1950 following a narrow 3–11 to 2–11 defeat of newcomers Wexford. Reigning champions Tipperary provided the opposition in the subsequent All-Ireland decider. After a dull hour of hurling Walsh's side were bested by 109 to 1–8.

It was 1953 before Walsh won a fifth Leinster medal as Wexford were outdone by 1–13 to 3–5. Kilkenny later faced a shock 3–5 to 1-10 All-Ireland semi-final defeat by Galway.

After playing second fiddle to Wexford over the next three years, Kilkenny bounced back in 1957. Walsh was an unused substitute for the team's 6–9 to 1-5 provincial decider defeat of Wexford. The subsequent All-Ireland final saw the first ever championship meeting of Kilkenny and Waterford. Walsh started the game on the substitutes' bench but entered the field of play in an exchange with John Sutton. Kilkenny trailed by six points with a quarter of the game remaining, however, a last-minute save by Ollie Walsh repelled the Waterford attack and secured a 4–10 to 3–12 victory. The win gave Walsh his first All-Ireland medal on the field of play. He retired from inter-county hurling shortly after.

=== Inter-provincial ===
Walsh also had the honour of being selected for Leinster in the inter-provincial series of games and enjoyed some success.

In 1956 he lined out in his only inter-provincial decider. A 5–11 to 1-7 trouncing of Munster gave Walsh a Railway Cup medal.

== Honours ==
=== Team ===
Carrickshock

- Kilkenny Senior Club Hurling Championship (1): 1942

Young Irelands

- Dublin Senior Club Hurling Championship (1): 1965

Kilkenny

- All-Ireland Senior Hurling Championship (2): 1947 (sub), 1957
- Leinster Senior Hurling Championship (6): 1945, 1946, 1947, 1950, 1953, 1957 (sub)

Leinster

- Railway Cup (1): 1956
