= Jimmy Heffernan =

Irish hurler and Gaelic footballer

Personal information
- Native name: Séamus Ó hIfearnáin (Irish)
- Born: 1925 Glenmore, County Kilkenny, Ireland
- Died: 21 March 2013 (aged 87) Carricklawn, Wexford, Ireland
- Occupation: Farmer
- Height: 5 ft 10 in (178 cm)

Sport
- Sport: Hurling
- Position: Forward
Clubs
- Years: Club
- Geraldine O'Hanrahan's; Glenmore; Carrickshock; Mullinavat
Club titles
	Football	Hurling
Kilkenny titles	4	1
Inter-county
- Years: County
- 1945-1953: Kilkenny
Inter-county titles
- Leinster titles: 5
- All-Irelands: 1
- NHL: 0

James Heffernan (1925 - 21 March 2013) was an Irish sportsman. He played hurling with his local club Glenmore and with the Kilkenny senior inter-county team from 1945 until 1953. With Kilkenny Heffernan won an All-Ireland title and five Leinster titles.

== Playing career ==
Heffernan first came to prominence at inter-county level as a member of the Kilkenny minor team that won the Leinster Minor Championship in 1942. He joined the Kilkenny senior team in 1945 and was at right wing-back in that year's All-Ireland final defeat to Tipperary. Heffernan was a substitute when Kilkenny lost a second successive All-Ireland final the following year, this time to Cork, but was restored to the starting fifteen in 1947 and finally claimed a winners' medal after a defeat of Cork in one of the greatest finals of all. He played in his fourth All-Ireland final in 1950, lining out at corner-forward against Tipperary, but Kilkenny were beaten by a point. Heffernan retired from inter-county hurling in 1953, by which time he had also claimed five Leinster Championships.

At club level he began his career with Geraldine O'Hanrahan's before joining the senior ranks with Mullinavat in 1943. Heffernan claimed his only county senior hurling championship medal with Carrickshock in 1951, while he ended his career with Glenmore with whom he won four county senior football championship medals.

== Later life and death ==
Heffernan worked with Clover Meats in Ferrybank before concentrating on farming near Tullogher. He died aged 87 on 21 March 2013 and was survived by his wife and seven children.

== Honours ==
Carrickshock

- Kilkenny Senior Hurling Championship (1): 1951

Glenmore

- Kilkenny Senior Football Championship (4): 1949, 1950, 1954, 1955
- Kilkenny Junior Hurling Championship (1): 1953

Kilkenny

- All-Ireland Senior Hurling Championship (1): 1947
- Leinster Senior Hurling Championship (5): 1945, 1946, 1947, 1950, 1953
- Leinster Minor Hurling Championship (1): 1942
