= Charlie Dorgan =

Irish hurler

Personal information
- Born: 25 October 1922 Little Island, County Cork, Ireland
- Died: 28 August 2001 (aged 78) Little Island, County Cork, Ireland
- Occupation: CIE road freight employee

Sport
- Sport: Hurling
- Position: Goalkeeper
Clubs
- Years: Club
- Little Island; Sarsfields; Leeside; Erin's Own
Club titles
- Cork titles: 0
Inter-county
Years	County	Apps (scores)
1944	Cork	0 (0-00)
Inter-county titles
- Munster titles: 1
- All-Irelands: 1
- NHL: 0

Charles Dorgan (25 October 1922 - 28 August 2001) was an Irish hurler. At club level he played with Little Island and Sarsfields and was also a member of the Cork senior hurling team.

== Career ==
Born in Little Island, Dorgan first enjoyed hurling success with the Little Island team that won the East Cork Junior B Championship title. He subsequently spent a number of years with the Sarsfields club before winning an East Cork Junior A Championship title with Leeside in 1949. At inter-county level, Dorgan was sub-goalkeeper to Tom Mulcahy on the Cork senior hurling team that won a record fourth successive All-Ireland Championship title in 1944.

== Honours ==
Little Island

- East Cork Junior B Hurling Championship: 1940

Leeside

- East Cork Junior A Hurling Championship: 1949

Cork

- All-Ireland Senior Hurling Championship: 1944
- Munster Senior Hurling Championship: 1944
