= Jim Donegan =

Irish hurler (born 1917)

Personal information
- Native name: Séamus Ó Donnagáin (Irish)
- Born: 30 January 1917 (age 109) Kilkenny, Ireland
- Height: 5 ft 10 in (178 cm)

Sport
- Sport: Hurling
- Position: Goalkeeper
Club
- Years: Club
- Eoghan Ruadh
Inter-county
- Years: County
- 1942-1945 1946-1947: Dublin; Kilkenny
Inter-county titles
- Leinster titles: 4
- All-Irelands: 1
- NHL: 0

James John Donegan (born 30 January 1917) is an Irish former hurler who played as a goalkeeper for the Dublin and Kilkenny senior teams.

Born in Kilkenny, Donegan first arrived on the inter-county scene when he first linked up with the Dublin senior team, making his debut in the 1942 championship. He later joined the Kilkenny senior team. During his career he won one All-Ireland medal and four Leinster medals.

Donegan also represented the Leinster inter-provincial team, however, he never won a Railway Cup medal. At club level he won one championship medal with Tullaroan.

== Honours ==
=== Team ===
Tullaroan

- Kilkenny Senior Hurling Championship (1): 1948

Dublin

- Leinster Senior Hurling Championship (2): 1942, 1944

Kilkenny

- All-Ireland Senior Hurling Championship (1): 1947
- Leinster Senior Hurling Championship (2): 1946 1947
