= Tom Walton (hurler) =

Irish hurler

Personal information
- Native name: Tomás de Bháltún (Irish)
- Born: 24 May 1921 Tullaroan, County Kilkenny, Ireland
- Died: 18 January 1998 (aged 76) Kilkenny, Ireland
- Occupation: Rate collector
- Height: 5 ft 7 in (170 cm)

Sport
- Sport: Hurling
- Position: Right wing-forward
Club
- Years: Club
- Tullaroan
Club titles
- Kilkenny titles: 1
Inter-county
- Years: County
- 1944-1950: Kilkenny
Inter-county titles
- Leinster titles: 4
- All-Irelands: 1
- NHL: 0

Thomas Christopher Walton (24 May 1921 – 18 January 1998) was an Irish hurler. At club level he played with Tullaroan and was an All-Ireland Championship winner with the Kilkenny senior hurling team in 1947.

== Playing career ==
Walton joined the Kilkenny senior team in 1945 and was at right corner-forward in that year's All-Ireland final defeat by Tipperary. He held the same position when Kilkenny lost a second successive All-Ireland final the following year, this time to Cork, but finally claimed a winners' medal from right wing-forward after a defeat of Cork in one of the greatest finals of all. Walton played in his fourth All-Ireland final in 1950, after being recalled to the panel, but Kilkenny were beaten by a point by Tipperary. He retired from inter-county hurling shortly after, by which time he had also claimed four Leinster Championships. Walton also captained Tullaroan to the county senior championship title in 1948.

== Later life and death ==
Walton worked as a rate collector for Kilkenny County Council for nearly 40 years. He died aged 76 on 18 January 1998 and was survived by his wife, five daughters and six sons, one of whom, Billy, won an All-Ireland Championship with Kilkenny in 1982.

== Honours ==
Tullaroan

- Kilkenny Senior Hurling Championship (1): 1948 (c)

Kilkenny

- All-Ireland Senior Hurling Championship (1): 1947
- Leinster Senior Hurling Championship (4): 1945, 1946, 1947, 1950
