= Con Murphy (Bride Rovers hurler) =

Irish hurler

Personal information
- Native name: Conchur Ó Murchú (Irish)
- Born: 20 August 1925 Rathcormac, County Cork, Ireland
- Died: 2 December 1995 (aged 70) Rochestown, Cork, Ireland
- Occupations: Pharmacist & Optician
- Height: 6 ft 1.5 in (186.7 cm)

Sport
- Sport: Hurling
- Position: Left Half Forward & Midfield
Clubs
- Years: Club
- Bride Rovers; Sarsfields; Cú Chulainn's; Civil Service
Club titles
- Cork titles: 1
Inter-county*
Years	County	Apps (scores)
1946-1948 1952-1953	Cork; Dublin	11 (2-5)
Inter-county titles
- Munster titles: 2
- Leinster titles: 1
- All-Irelands: 1
- NHL: 0
- *Inter County team apps and scores correct as of 16:12, 18 April 2015.

Cornelius "Con" Murphy (1925 - 1995) was an Irish hurler who played as a midfielder for the Cork and Dublin senior teams.

Born in Rathcormac, County Cork, Murphy first arrived on the inter-county scene when he first linked up with the Cork junior team. He made his senior debut at the age of 21 during the 1946 championship before later joining the Dublin senior team. Murphy enjoyed a successful career, winning one All-Ireland medal, two Munster medals and one Leinster medal. He was an All-Ireland runner-up on two occasions.

Murphy represented the Leinster inter-provincial team at various times, however, he never won a Railway Cup medal. At club level he was a one-time championship medallist with Cú Chulainn's while he also played with Bride Rovers, Sarsfields and Civil Service.

Murphy retired from inter-county hurling following the conclusion of the 1953 championship

== Playing career ==
=== Inter-county ===
Murphy first played for Cork as a member of the junior team on 19 May 1946. His performance in this grade led to him being drafted onto the Cork senior team. He made his championship debut at the age of 21 on 9 June 1946 in a 2-9 to 2-1 Munster quarter-final defeat of Clare. He immediately became a regular member of the starting fifteen and later won his first Munster medal following a 3-8 to 1-3 defeat of Limerick. On 1 September 1946 Cork faced old rivals Kilkenny in the All-Ireland decider. While some had written off Cork's chances, they took an interval lead of four points. With ten minutes remaining Cork's lead was reduced to just two points, however, goals by O'Riordan and Joe Kelly secured a 7-6 to 3-8 victory. The victory gave Murphy an All-Ireland medal.

Cork retained their provincial dominance in 1947 with Murphy picking up a second winners' medal following a 2-6 to 2-3 defeat of Limerick once again. The subsequent All-Ireland final on 7 September 1947 was a repeat of the previous year with Kilkenny providing the opposition. The stakes were high for both sides as Cork were aiming for a record sixth championship in seven seasons while Kilkenny were aiming to avoid becoming the first team to lose three consecutive All-Ireland finals. In what has been described as one of the greatest deciders of all-time, little separated the two teams over the course if the hour. A Joe Kelly goal put Cork one point ahead with time almost up, however, Terry Leahy proved to be the hero of the day. He converted a free to level the sides again before sending over the match-winner from the subsequent puck-out. With that the game was over and Cork were beaten by 0-14 to 2-7. It was the fifth time that Kilkenny had pipped Cork by a single point in an All-Ireland final.

By 1952 Murphy had switched allegiance and was now lining out with Dublin. He won a Leinster medal that year following a 7-2 to 3-6 trouncing of reigning champions Wexford. On 7 September 1952 Dublin faced Murphy's native county of Cork in the All-Ireland decider. Liam Dowling scored a vital goal in the first half to give Cork the interval lead. Dublin's attack collapsed in the second half as Dowling scored a second goal. The 2-14 to 0-7 score line resulted in defeat for Murphy.

== Honours ==
=== Team ===
Cork

- All-Ireland Senior Hurling Championship (1): 1946
- Munster Senior Hurling Championship (2): 1946, 1947

Dublin

- Leinster Senior Hurling Championship (1): 1952
