= Jim Morrison (hurler) =

Irish hurler (1923–1994)

Personal information
- Native name: Séamus Ó Muireasáin (Irish)
- Born: 1 July 1923 Cork, Ireland
- Died: 30 August 1994 (aged 71) Los Angeles, California, U.S.
- Occupation: Roman Catholic priest

Sport
- Sport: Hurling
- Position: Full-forward
Club
- Years: Club
- St Finbarr's
Club titles
- Cork titles: 1
Inter-county
Years	County	Apps (scores)
1944	Cork	4 (3-01)
Inter-county titles
- Munster titles: 1
- All-Irelands: 1
- NHL: 0

James Finbarr Morrison (1 July 1923 – 30 August 1994) was an Irish hurler who played as a full-forward at senior level for the Cork county team. Morrison made his first appearance for the team during the 1944 championship and was a regular member of the starting fifteen for just one season. During that time he won one All-Ireland medal and one Munster medal. At club level Morrison was a one-time county senior championship medalist with St Finbarr's.

== Playing career ==
=== Club ===
Morrison played his club hurling with St Finbarr's and had much success. He first played for the famous "Barr's" club in the minor grade and collected three successive championship medals in that grade between 1939 and 1941. In 1942 Morrison played in his first senior county final with "the Barr's". Ballincollig, a team who had defeated nine-in-a-row hopefuls Glen Rovers in the semi-final, provided the opposition. St Finbarr's made no mistake and powered to a 5–7 to 2-2. It was Morrison's sole championship medal with the club.

=== Inter-county ===
Morrison first came to prominence on the inter-county scene as a member of the Cork minor hurling team in 1941. He won a Munster medal that year following a 4–6 to 3–3 defeat of Tipperary. He later lined out in an All-Ireland decider against Kilkenny. A 5–2 to 2–2 score line gave Cork the victory and gave Morrison an All-Ireland Minor Hurling Championship medal.

In 1944 Morrison joined the senior team as Cork were attempting to capture a fourth All-Ireland title in-a-row. No team in the history of the hurling championship had won more than three consecutive titles. The year got off to a good start when Cork defeated Limerick by 4–6 to 3-6 after a replay to give Morrison a Munster medal. For the third time in four years Cork faced Dublin in an All-Ireland decider. Joe Kelly was the hero of the day and he contributed greatly to Cork's 2–13 to 1–2 victory. It was an All-Ireland medal for Morrison. He died in Los Angeles, California in August 1994 at the age of 71.

== Honours ==
St Finbarr's

- Cork Senior Hurling Championship: 1942

Cork

- All-Ireland Senior Hurling Championship: 1944
- Munster Senior Hurling Championship: 1944
- All-Ireland Minor Hurling Championship: 1941
- Munster Minor Hurling Championship: 1941
