= Johnny Quirke =

Irish hurler

Personal information
- Native name: Seán Ó Coirc (Irish)
- Nickname: Quirkey
- Born: 2 May 1911 Milltown, County Kerry, Ireland
- Died: 24 August 1983 (aged 72) Shandon, Cork, Ireland

Sport
- Sport: Hurling
- Position: Right corner-forward
Club
- Years: Club
- 1929-1948: Blackrock
Club titles
- Cork titles: 3
Inter-county
Years	County	Apps (scores)
1932–1946	Cork	33 (19–20)
Inter-county titles
- Munster titles: 4
- All-Irelands: 4
- NHL: 2

John Quirke (2 May 1911 – 24 August 1983) was an Irish hurler who played as a right corner-forward for the Cork senior team.

Quirke made his first appearance for the team during the 1932 championship and was a regular member of the starting fifteen until his retirement after the 1946 championship. During that time, he won four All-Ireland medals, four Munster medals and two National League medals. Quirke was an All-Ireland runner-up on one occasion.

At club level, Quirke was a three-time county club championship medalist with Blackrock.

Quirke's sister, Dolly Leahy, was an All-Ireland medalist in camogie with Cork.

== Playing career ==
=== Club ===
Quirke played his club hurling with Blackrock GAA club. In 1929, he was just out of the minor grade when he lined out in his first championship decider at senior level. A 5–6 to 2–2 defeat of fierce city rivals St. Finbarr's gave Quirke his first championship medal.

Blackrock reached the county final once again in 1930. A 3–8 to 1–3 defeat of Glen Rovers gave Quirke a second successive championship medal.

1931 presented Blackrock with the chance to complete a hat-trick of championship titles. A decisive 2–4 to 0–3 of Éire Óg gave Quirke his third successive championship medal. Blackrock would not win another championship for twenty-five years.

=== Cork ===
Quirke first played for Cork when he was drafted onto the minor team during the 1929 Munster Minor Championship. He made his only appearance in the grade on 20 October 1929 when he lined out at centre-back in Cork's 2-01 to 0-02 defeat by Tipperary.

As county champions, Quirke's club Blackrock had the selection of the Cork senior team for the 1932 Munster Championship. A dispute arose between the club and the Cork County Board when the system was changed and some senior players boycotted the team, however, Quirke was one of a number of new additions to a team that held both the Munster and All-Ireland titles. He made his championship debut on 12 June 1932 when he lined out at left corner-forward in a 5-06 to 1-05 victory over Waterford, but was switched to left wing-forward when Cork suffered a 5-02 to 4-01 defeat by Clare in the 1932 Munster final.

By the start of the 1939 Munster Championship Quirke, who had been one of Cork's most consistent forwards since his debut, found himself switched to the centre-back position in an effort to stymie the influence of Limerick's star forward Mick Mackey. He claimed his first Munster Championship medal that year after a 4-03 to 3-04 victory over Limerick in the final. On 3 September 1939, Quirke lined out at centre-back when Cork suffered a 2-07 to 3-03 defeat by Kilkenny in the "thunder and Lightning" All-Ireland final.

Although defeated in the All-Ireland decider, Cork continued their breakthrough in 1940. An 8–9 to 6–4 defeat of Tipperary in the decider gave Quirke his first National Hurling League medal. He added a second winners' medal to his collection in 1941 following a defeat of Dublin.

An outbreak of foot and mouth disease severely hampered the 1941 championship. As a result of this, Cork was nominated to represent the province in the All-Ireland series. Quirke was on the team for the final against Dublin, however, it turned into a one-sided affair thanks to contributing goals from Quirke himself and Ted O'Sullivan. At the full-time whistle, Cork had won by 5–11 to 0–6. It was one of the most one-sided championship deciders of all-time, however, it did give Quirke an All-Ireland medal.

Quirke added a second Munster medal to his collection in 1942 as Tipp were downed by 4–15 to 4–1. The All-Ireland final was a replay of the previous year with Dublin providing the opposition once again. The game was a close affair with just a point separating the sides at the three-quarter stage. In the end Cork won comfortably enough by 2–14 to 3–4 and Quirke collected a second All-Ireland medal.

A 2–13 to 3–8 defeat of Waterford in 1943 gave Quirke a third Munster medal. He later lined out in a fourth All-Ireland decider with Antrim becoming the first Ulster side to qualify for a final. Cork built up an unassailable 3–11 to 0–2 half-time lead over Antrim, and the final score of 5–16 to 0–4 gave Cork their second-ever hat-trick of All-Ireland titles and gave Quirke a third All-Ireland medal.

In 1944, Cork was attempting to capture a fourth All-Ireland title in-a-row. No team in the history of the hurling championship had won more than three consecutive titles. The year got off to a good start when Cork defeated Limerick by 4–6 to 3–6 after a replay to give Quirke a fourth Munster medal. For the third time in four years Cork faced Dublin in an All-Ireland decider. Joe Kelly was the hero of the day and he contributed greatly to Cork's 2–13 to 1–2 victory. It was a remarkable fourth successive All-Ireland medal for Quirke.

Five-in-a-row proved to be a bridge too far for Cork, however, the team returned in 1946. A 3–9 to 1–6 defeat of Waterford allowed Cork to advance to another Munster final. Unfortunately for Quirke, that semi-final victory was his last championship game for Cork.

=== Inter-provincial ===
Murphy also had the honour of being selected for Munster in the inter-provincial series of games. He made his debut with the province in 1936 and was a regular until his retirement in 1945.

In 1936, Quirke was one of only two Corkonians to line out in the inter-provincial decider. A narrow 2–8 to 3–4 defeat by fierce rivals Leinster was the result on that occasion.

In spite of a defeat in his debut season, the province went on to dominate the rest of the decade. Defeats of Leinster in 1937 and 1938 gave Quirke his first two Railway Cup medals.

Quirke was dropped from the starting fifteen in 1939, however, he won a third Railway Cup medal as a non-playing substitute following a 4–4 to 1–6 defeat of Leinster. He was reinstated to the starting fifteen the following year and won a fourth winners' medal as Leinster were downed once again.

Munster surrendered their title to Leinster the following year, however, the province went on to dominate the rest of the decade once again. Defeats of Leinster (1942, 1943), Connacht (1944) and Ulster (1945) brought Quirke's Railway Cup medal tally to eight.

== Death ==
On 24 August 1983, Quirke died aged 72 at the North Infirmary in Cork after unexpectedly taking ill. He was survived by his wife Hannah.

== Honours ==
=== Team ===
Blackrock

- Cork Senior Club Hurling Championship (3): 1929, 1930, 1931

Cork

- All-Ireland Senior Hurling Championship (4): 1941, 1942, 1943, 1944
- Munster Senior Hurling Championship (4): 1939, 1942, 1943, 1944
- National Hurling League (2): 1939–40, 1940–41

Munster

- Railway Cup (8): 1937, 1938, 1939 (sub), 1940, 1942, 1943, 1944, 1945 (sub)

Sporting positions
Preceded by Seán Condon	Munster Hurling Captain; 1945	Succeeded by Ger Cornally
Achievements
Preceded by Seán Condon (Munster)	Railway Cup Hurling Final winning captain 1945	Succeeded by Ger Cornally (Munster)
