= John Thornhill (hurler) =

Irish hurler (1929–2003)

Personal information
- Native name: Seán Tornail (Irish)
- Born: St John Thornhill; 1929 Kildorrery, County Cork, Ireland
- Died: 9 May 2003 (aged 74) Youghal, County Cork, Ireland
- Occupation: Roman Catholic priest

Sport
- Sport: Hurling
- Position: Right corner-back
Club
- Years: Club
- Oldcastletown
Club titles
- Cork titles: 0
Inter-county
Years	County	Apps (scores)
1947-1950	Cork	2 (0-00)
Inter-county titles
- Munster titles: 1
- All-Irelands: 0
- NHL: 0

St John Thornhill (1929 – 9 May 2003) was an Irish hurler who played at club level with Oldcastletown and at inter-county level with the Cork senior hurling team. He usually lined out as a corner-back.

== Career ==
Thornhill first game to hurling prominence with the Oldcastletown club while also making an impression as a schoolboy at St Colman's College. He arrived on the inter-county scene as a member of the Cork minor hurling team in 1946, however, his two-year tenure in this grade ended without success. He also earned selection for the Cork junior hurling team and was part of their All-Ireland JHC title triumph in 1947. Even though he had just turned 18, Thornhill was a member of the extended panel of the Cork senior hurling team that year. He was a reserve when Cork lost the 1947 All-Ireland final to Kilkenny. Thornhill's religious studies impacted on his playing career and he made his last appearance in the Cork colours in a junior game in 1952.

== Personal life and death ==
After his ordination, Thornhill spent over 30 years serving the Cobh parish before moving to Youghal in 1988. He had been named a monsignor shortly before his death on 9 May 2003.

== Honours ==
Cork

- Munster Senior Hurling Championship: 1947
- All-Ireland Junior Hurling Championship: 1947
- Munster Junior Hurling Championship: 1947
