= Paddy Healy =

Irish hurler and Gaelic footballer

Personal information
- Native name: Pádraig Ó hÉilí (Irish)
- Nickname: Hitler
- Born: 21 July 1922 Ballincollig, County Cork, Ireland
- Died: 26 April 1983 (aged 60) College Road, Cork, Ireland
- Occupation: Army officer

Sport
- Football Position: Forward
- Hurling Position: Right wing-forward
Clubs
- Years: Club
- Ballincollig; Clonakilty
Club titles
	Football	Hurling
Cork titles	4	0
Inter-county
- Years: County
- 1943–1953: Cork
Inter-county titles
	Football	Hurling
Munster Titles	1	5
All-Ireland Titles	1	3

Paddy Healy (21 July 1922 – 26 April 1983) was an Irish hurler and Gaelic footballer. His league and championship career with the Cork senior teams as a dual player lasted ten years from 1943 until 1953.

Born in Ballincollig, Healy began his thirty-year club hurling and football career with the Ballincollig club. He won a junior football championship medal in 1940, before losing three successive senior hurling championship finals. Healy subsequently joined the Clonakilty club, winning senior football championship medals in 1944, 1946, 1947 and 1952. He ended his career with the Ballincollig club, winning a divisional football championship medal in 1964.

Healy made his debut on the inter-county scene at the age of twenty-one when he was selected for the Cork senior hurling team during the 1943 championship. Over the course of the following decade he won All-Ireland SHC medals in 1943, 1944 and 1946. As a member of the Cork senior football team, Healy won an All-Ireland SFC medal in 1945.

Healy was the grandfather of association footballer Colin Healy.

== Honours ==
Ballincollig

- Cork Junior Football Championship (1): 1940
- Mid Cork Junior A Football Championship (1): 1964

Clonakilty

- Cork Senior Football Championship (4): 1944, 1946, 1947, 1952

Cork

- All-Ireland Senior Hurling Championship (3): 1943, 1944, 1946
- All-Ireland Senior Football Championship (1): 1945
- Munster Senior Hurling Championship (5): 1943, 1944, 1946, 1952, 1953
- Munster Senior Football Championship (1): 1945
- All-Ireland Junior Hurling Championship (1): 1950
- Munster Junior Hurling Championship (1): 1950
