= Con Murphy =

Con Murphy may refer to:

- Con Murphy (Valley Rovers hurler) (1922–2007), Irish hurler for Cork, later GAA President
- Con Murphy (Bride Rovers hurler), Irish hurler for Cork and Dublin
- Con Murphy (baseball) (1863–1914), American Major League Baseball pitcher
- Con Murphy (rugby, born 1908) (1908–1964), Welsh dual-code international rugby union and rugby league footballer
- Con Murphy (rugby union, born 1914) (1914–2002), Irish rugby union international
- Con Murphy (presenter) (born 1966), Irish sports presenter
