= Paddy McCormack =

Paddy McCormack may refer to:

- Paddy McCormack (footballer)
- Paddy McCormack (hurler, born 1922)
- Paddy McCormack (Tipperary hurler) (born 2005)
