= Mick Butler (Dublin hurler) =

Irish hurler

Michael Butler
Personal information
- Native name: Mícheál de Buitléir (Irish)
- Nickname: Mick
- Born: 2 October 1916 Lismatigue, Hugginstown, Co Kilkenny
- Died: 2 January 1987 (aged 70) St Lukes Hospital, Kilkenny
- Height: 5 ft 9 in (175 cm)

Sport
- Sport: Hurling
- Position: Full back
Club
- Years: Club
- 1936-1946: Faughs
Club titles
- Dublin titles: 7
Inter-county
Years	County	Apps (scores)
1937-1945 1946	Dublin; Kilkenny	26; 4
Inter-county titles
- Leinster titles: 5
- All-Irelands: 1

Michael Butler (2 October 1916 – 2 January 1987) was an Irish hurling player. He played with the Faughs GAA club in Dublin and was a member of the Dublin senior inter-county team from 1938 to 1945. Butler also returned to his native county and played for Kilkenny in 1946. He was once referred to as "The only full back who could keep Mick Mackey in his place".

== Club ==
Michael Butler played for Faughs GAA Club in Dublin and won 7 Dublin Senior Hurling Championship titles with them. He won Dublin county finals between 1936-1946.

== Inter-county ==
=== Dublin 1937-1945 ===
Michael Butler played for the Dublin Junior team in 1937 and won an All Ireland final with them that year. He graduated to the senior team the following year and he won an All Ireland in 1938 with Dublin playing full back. They beat Waterford in the final in Croke Park on 4 September 1938, on a scoreline of Dublin 2-5 to 1-6 Waterford. This was Butler's only All Ireland win but he would appear in 4 more finals losing to Cork in each, 1941, 1942, 1944 with Dublin and 1946 with Kilkenny. Butler also captained Dublin in the 1944 All Ireland final and all of that season.

=== Leinster finals ===
Butler played in 10 Leinster finals. He was on 5 winning teams in 1938, 1941, 1942, 1944 with Dublin and Kilkenny in 1946. Butler also played in 4 Leinster finals where his team was beaten 1939, 1940, 1943, 1945. The 1938 Leinster final was a draw the first day with a Kilkenny and Dublin both scoring 2-3 a piece. Butler was captain of the Dublin side which won the Leinster final in 1944.

=== Kilkenny 1946 ===
Butler returned to play for his native county in 1946 and the team won Leinster with Butler at full back. They lost the All Ireland final however to Cork on a scoreline of 7-5 to 3-8.

=== Oireachtas Final ===
Butler won and Oireachtas medal 1944 which he captained as the beat Galway, Dublin 6-6 to 3-6 Galway

=== Railway Cup ===
Butler was full back on the only Leinster team to win the Railway cup during his Inter-county career in 1941. Leinster 2-5 to 2-4 Munster

== Life After Hurling ==
Butler lived in Dublin until 1952 when he moved to England and was first Chairman of the Derbyshire county board. He returned to Ireland in 1973, and lived in Erril, Rathdowney, County Laois. He spent his final few years in Freshford County Kilkenny.

== Honors ==
=== Club ===
==== Faughs ====
- Dublin Senior Hurling Championship (7) 1936, 1939, 1940, 1941, 1944, 1945, 1946

== Inter-county ==
=== Dublin ===
- Leinster Senior Hurling Championship (5) 1938, 1941, 1942, 1944 (c)
- All Ireland Senior Hurling Championship (1) 1938
- Oireachtas Cup (1) 1944 (c)

=== Kilkenny ===
- Leinster Senior Hurling Championship (1) 1946

== Provincial ==
=== Leinster ===
- Railway Cup (1) 1941
