= Frank White (hurler) =

Irish hurler

Personal information
- Native name: Proinsias de Faoite (Irish)
- Born: 1913 Raharney, County Westmeath, Ireland
- Died: 1984 (aged 71) Dublin, Ireland
- Occupation: Butcher

Sport
- Sport: Hurling
- Position: Centre-back
Club
- Years: Club
- Eoghan Ruadh
Inter-county
- Years: County
- 1936–1940 1941–1944: Westmeath; Dublin
Inter-county titles
- Leinster titles: 3
- All-Irelands: 0
- NHL: 0

Frank White (1913–1984) was an Irish hurler who played as a centre-back for the Westmeath and Dublin senior teams.

Born in Raharney, County Westmeath, White first arrived on the inter-county scene when he first linked up with the Westmeath junior team. He made his senior debut in the 1937 championship before later joining the Dublin senior team. During his career he won three Leinster medals. White was an All-Ireland runner-up on three occasions.

White also represented the Leinster inter-provincial team on a number of occasions, winning one Railway Cup medal. At club level he won two championship medals with Young Irelands after beginning his career with Raharney.

His retirement came following a defeat by Cork in the 1944 All-Ireland final.

== Honours ==
=== Team ===
Young Irelands

- Dublin Senior Hurling Championship (2): 1942, 1943

Westmeath

- All-Ireland Junior Hurling Championship (1): 1936
- Leinster Junior Hurling Championship (1): 1936

Kilkenny

- Leinster Senior Hurling Championship (3): 1941, 1942, 1944

Leinster

- Railway Cup (1): 1941

Sporting positions
Preceded by Ned Wade	Dublin Senior Hurling Captain; 1942	Succeeded by
