= Seán Condon =

Irish hurler (1923–2001)

Personal information
- Native name: Seán Condún (Irish)
- Born: 11 June 1923 The Lough, Cork, Ireland
- Died: 27 October 2001 (aged 78) Wilton, Cork, Ireland
- Occupation: Cork Harbour official
- Height: 5 ft 11 in (180 cm)

Sport
- Sport: Hurling
- Position: Centre-forward
Club
- Years: Club
- 1941–1951: St Finbarr's
Club titles
- Cork titles: 4
Inter-county
Years	County	Apps (scores)
1942–1951	Cork	21 (7–34)
Inter-county titles
- Munster titles: 5
- All-Irelands: 4
- NHL: 0

Seán Condon (11 June 1923 – 27 October 2001) was an Irish hurler and Gaelic footballer. At club level he played with St Finbarr's, while he was also a member of the Cork senior hurling team.

Although cut short by injury, Condon had a successful career across various levels. Regarded as the St Finbarr's club's greatest-ever hurler, he captained club, county and province to success in various competitions. Condon became the first player to captain a team to All-Ireland MHC and All-Ireland SHC successes, while his tenure as Cork's senior team captain saw the team win a record-setting fourth successive All-Ireland SHC title.

== Club career ==
Condon first played hurling as a schoolboy at Presentation Brothers School, Greenmount. During his time there he captained the school to win the Hobbs & Cotter Cup and the Barry Cup. Condon's club career with St Finbarr's began as a 13-year-old member of the club's minor hurling team in 1937. His five consecutive years in this grade yielded three successive Cork MHC titles between 1939 and 1941. He also claimed a Cork MFC medal in 1941.

Condon was still eligible for the St Finbarr's minor team when he made his senior team debut in a Cork SHC second round defeat by Glen Rovers in July 1941. Condon immediately became a regular member of the starting fifteen and scored a point from win-back when St Finabrr's beat Ballincollig by 5-07 to 2-02 in the 1942 final. He claimed a second winners' medal the following year when St Finbarr's beat Ballincollig after a replay.

Condon was the St Finbarr's top scorer with 1-01 when they beat Glen Rovers by 2-03 to 2-01 in the 1946 final. He was appointed team captain the following year and collected a fourth and final SHC winners' medal after a 4-06 to 4-04 defeat of Sarsfields. An injury brought Condon's club career to a premature end at the age of 28.

== Inter-county career ==
Condon first played for Cork during a two year tenure as a dual player at minor level. He had little success as a Gaelic footballer, however, as captain of the Cork minor hurling team in his final year in that grade he won a Munster MHC medal. Condon later captained Cork to a 5-02 to 2-02 defeat of Kilkenny in the 1941 All-Ireland minor final.

Condon's first appearance for the senior team was against Kilkenny in a tournament game in April 1942. He later made his championship debut in the 1942 Munster semi-final defeat of Limerick, before ending the campaign with his first Munster SHC medal after a defeat of Tipperary in that year's Munster final. Condon subsequently claimed All-Ireland SHC honours when Dublin were beaten by 2-14 to 3-04 in the 1942 All-Ireland final.

After claiming a second successive Munster SHC title, Condon later won a second consecutive All-Ireland SHC medal following Cork's 5-16 to 0-04 victory over Antrim in the 1943 All-Ireland final. The success of St Finbarr's at club level meant that the captaincy of Cork's senior team passed to Condon in 1944. He won a third consecutive Munster SHC medal that year, after a 4-06 to 3-06 defeat of Limerick in a replay. Condon later captained Cork to a 2-13 to 1-02 defeat of Dublin in the 1944 All-Ireland final. It was his third successive winners' medal in that competition, while it was a record-setting fourth successive All-Ireland SHC for the Cork team.

After failing to secure a fifth successive All-Ireland SHC title in 1945, Condon lost his place on the Cork team. In spite of that, he claimed further Munster SHC and All-Ireland SHC titles as a substitute in 1946. Condon was appointed captain for the second time in his career a year later and returned to the starting fifteen. He claimed a fifth Munster SHC medal in six seasons that year, after scoring four points in the three-point defeat of Limerick in the Munster final. Condon later captained Cork to a 0-14 to 2-07 defeat by Kilkenny in the 1947 All-Ireland final.

Condon was part of Cork's junior team in 1951 and won a Munster JFC medal that year. He later collected an All-Ireland JFC medal following a 5-11 to 1-03 defeat of Warwickshire in the 1951 All-Ireland junior final. He was later selected for the senior team in a National Football League game against Mayo in November 1951. A leg injury sustained in that game brought his inter-county career to an end.

== Inter-provincial career ==
Condon's performances at inter-county level resulted in his selection for Munster in 1944. He captained Munster to a 4-10 to 4-04 defeat of Connacht in the 1944 Railway Cup final.

== Personal life and death ==
Condon was born and raised in Fuller's Lane near the Lough in Cork in June 1923. After his schooling at Presentation Brothers School, Greenmount, he worked for the Cork Harbour Commissioners.

Condon died at Cork University Hospital on 27 October 2001, at the age of 78.

== Honours ==
St Finbarr's

- Cork Senior Hurling Championship: 1942, 1943, 1946, 1947 (c)
- Cork Minor Football Championship: 1941
- Cork Minor Hurling Championship: 1939, 1940, 1941 (c)

Cork

- All-Ireland Senior Hurling Championship: 1942, 1943, 1944 (c), 1946
- Munster Senior Hurling Championship: 1942, 1943, 1944, 1946, 1947
- All-Ireland Junior Football Championship: 1951
- Munster Junior Football Championship: 1951
- All-Ireland Minor Hurling Championship: 1941 (c)
- Munster Minor Hurling Championship: 1941 (c)

Munster

- Railway Cup: 1944 (c)

Sporting positions
Preceded by Jack Lynch	Munster hurling team captain 1944	Succeeded by Johnny Quirke
Preceded by Mick Kenefick	Cork senior hurling team captain 1944–1945	Succeeded by Christy Ring
Preceded by Christy Ring	Cork senior hurling team captain 1947	Succeeded by Jim Young
Achievements
Preceded by Paddy McCarthy	All-Ireland Minor Hurling Final winning captain 1941	Succeeded by Des Healy
Preceded by Jack Lynch	Railway Cup Hurling Final winning captain 1944	Succeeded by Johnny Quirke
Preceded by Mick Kennefick	All-Ireland Senior Hurling Final winning captain 1944	Succeeded by John Maher
