= 1940 Cork Intermediate Hurling Championship =

Hurling competition

- Champions: Buttevant (1st title); Batt Thornhill (captain)
- Runners-up: Ballincollig; Willie Murphy (captain)

The 1940 Cork Intermediate Hurling Championship was the 31st staging of the Cork Intermediate Hurling Championship since its establishment by the Cork County Board in 1909.

Ballincollig entered the championship as the defending champions.

The final was played on 19 August 1940 at the Athletic Grounds in Cork, between Buttevant and Ballincollig, in what was their second meeting in the final overall and a first meeting in the final in 11 years. Buttevant won the match by 2–04 to 1–04 to claim their first ever championship title.

== Results ==
=== Final ===
| 19 August 1940 Final | Buttevant | 2-04 – 1-04 | Ballincollig | Cork Athletic Grounds |
