= 1941 All-Ireland Minor Hurling Championship =

Results of the 14th All-Ireland Minor Hurling Championship

All-Ireland Minor Hurling Championship 1941
All Ireland Champions
- Winners: Cork (5th win)
- Captain: Seán Condon

All Ireland Runners-up
- Runners-up: Galway

Provincial Champions
- Munster: Cork
- Leinster: Laois
- Ulster: Antrim
- Connacht: Galway

The 1941 All-Ireland Minor Hurling Championship was the 14th staging of the All-Ireland Minor Hurling Championship since its establishment by the Gaelic Athletic Association in 1928. As a result of the Emergency it was the last championship to be staged until 1945.

Limerick entered the championship as the defending champions, however, they were beaten by Clare in the Munster quarter-final.

On 28 September 1941 Cork won the championship following a 3–11 to 1–1 defeat of Galway in the All-Ireland final. This was their fifth All-Ireland title and their first in two championship seasons.

== Leinster Minor Hurling Championship ==
=== Leinster final ===
16 November 1941 Final	Kilkenny	2-04 - 3-05	Laois	Nowlan Park

== Munster Minor Hurling Championship ==
=== Munster semi-finals ===
20 July 1941 Semi-final	Cork	5-10 - 0-00	Clare	Buttevant Grounds

=== Munster final ===
26 October 1941 Final	Cork	4-06 - 3-03	Tipperary	Gaelic Grounds

== All-Ireland Minor Hurling Championship ==
=== All-Ireland semi-finals ===
7 September 1941 Semi-final	Cork	13-08 - 1-02	Antrim	Croke Park

14 September 1941 Semi-final	Galway	5-01 - 4-03	Laois	St Cronan's Park

=== All-Ireland final ===
28 September 1941 Final	Cork	3-11 - 1-01	Galway	Croke Park
