= Ger Cornally =

Irish hurler (1913–1992)

Personal information
- Native name: Gearóid Ó Cornalaigh (Irish)
- Born: 1913 Thurles, County Tipperary, Ireland
- Died: 18 April 1992 (aged 78) Thurles, County Tipperary, Ireland

Sport
- Sport: Hurling
- Position: Full-back
Club
- Years: Club
- Thurles Sarsfields
Club titles
- Tipperary titles: 8
Inter-county
- Years: County
- 1937-1948: Tipperary
Inter-county titles
- Munster titles: 3
- All-Irelands: 2
- NHL: 0

Ger Cornally (1913 - 18 April 1992) was an Irish hurler who played as a full-back for the Tipperary senior team.

Born in Thurles, County Tipperary, Cornally first arrived on the inter-county scene when he first linked up with the Tipperary junior team. He made his senior debut during the 1937 championship. Cornally immediately became a regular member of the starting fifteen and won two All-Ireland medals and three Munster medals.

As a member of the Munster inter-provincial team on a number of occasions, Cornally won two Railway Cup medals. At club level he was an eight-time championship medallist with Thurles Sarsfields.

Cornally retired from inter-county hurling following the conclusion of the 1948 championship.

== Honours ==
=== Player ===
Thurles Sarsfields

- Tipperary Senior Hurling Championship (8): 1935, 1936, 1938, 1939, 1942, 1944, 1945, 1946 (c)

Tipperary

- All-Ireland Senior Hurling Championship (2): 1937, 1945
- Munster Senior Hurling Championship (3): 1937, 1941, 1945

Munster

- Railway Cup (3): 1938 (sub), 1940, 1946 (c)

Sporting positions
Preceded by Johnny Quirke	Munster Hurling Captain; 1946	Succeeded by Christy Ring
Achievements
Preceded by Johnny Quirke (Cork)	Railway Cup Hurling Final winning captain 1946	Succeeded by Seánie Duggan (Connacht)
