= 1942 All-Ireland Senior Hurling Championship final =

1942 All-Ireland Senior Hurling Final
- Event: 1942 All-Ireland Senior Hurling Championship
Cork	Dublin
2–14	3–4
- Date: 6 September 1942
- Venue: Croke Park, Dublin
- Referee: M. Hennessy (Clare)
- Attendance: 27,313

The 1942 All-Ireland Senior Hurling Championship Final was the 55th All-Ireland Final and the culmination of the 1942 All-Ireland Senior Hurling Championship, an inter-county hurling tournament for the top teams in Ireland. The match was held at Croke Park, Dublin, on 6 September 1942, between Cork and Dublin. The Leinster champions lost to their Munster opponents on a score line of 2–14 to 3–4.

== Match details ==
1942-09-06
15:15 IST

Cork	2–14 – 3-4	Dublin

Croke Park, Dublin
Attendance: 27,313
Referee: M. Hennessy (Clare)

Cork	Dublin

Cork Team 1 Ned Porter 2 Willie Murphy 3 Batt Thornhill 4 Con Murphy 5 Alan Lotty 6 Din Joe Buckley 7 Jim Young 8 Jack Lynch 9 Paddy O'Donovan 10 Christy Ring 11 Sean Condon 12 Mick Kenefick 13 Charlie Tobin 14 John Quirke 15 Derry Beckett Substitutes Jim Buttimer for Ned Porter Unused Substitutes Fr Con Cottrell, Jack Buckley, Jim O'Neill, Bobby O'Regan Trainer Jim Tough Barry Selectors Jack Leahy, Paddy Fox Collins, John Foley, Tom McCarthy, Dan Connolly
