= 1947–48 National Hurling League =

17th season of the National Hurling League

League details
- Dates: October 1947 – April 1948
- Teams: 12

League champions
- Winners: Cork (5th win)
- Captain: Jim Young

League runners-up
- Runners-up: Tipperary
- Captain: Willie Wall

The 1947–48 National Hurling League was the 17th season of the National Hurling League, an annual hurling competition for the GAA county teams. Cork won the league, beating Tipperary by 3–3 to 1–2 in the final.
