= Paddy McCormack (hurler, born 1922) =

Laois hurler

Paddy McCormack (1922 - 27 September 2017) was an Irish sportsman who played hurling at senior level as a left corner-back for the Laois county team and was also a referee.
