= 1946 All-Ireland Senior Hurling Championship final =

1946 All-Ireland Senior Hurling Final
- Event: 1946 All-Ireland Senior Hurling Championship
Cork	Kilkenny
7-5	3-8
- Date: 1 September 1946
- Venue: Croke Park, Dublin
- Referee: J. Flaherty (Offaly)
- Attendance: 64,415

The 1946 All-Ireland Senior Hurling Championship Final was the 59th All-Ireland Final and the culmination of the 1946 All-Ireland Senior Hurling Championship, an inter-county hurling tournament for the top teams in Ireland. The match was held at Croke Park, Dublin, on 1 September 1946, between Kilkenny and Cork. The Leinster champions lost to their Munster opponents on a score line of 7–5 to 3–8.

== Match details ==
1946-09-01
15:15 IST

Cork	7-5 – 3-8	Kilkenny

Croke Park, Dublin
Attendance: 64,415
Referee: J. Flaherty (Offaly)

Cork Team 1 Tom Mulcahy 2 Willie Murphy 3 Con Murphy Valley Rovers 4 Din Joe Buckley 5 Paddy O'Donovan 6 Alan Lotty 7 Jim Young 8 Jack Lynch 9 Fr Con Cottrell 10 Paddy Hitler Healy 11 Christy Ring 12 Con Murphy Bride Rovers 13 Mossie O'Riordan 14 Jerry O'Riordan 15 Fr Joe Kelly Substitutes Sean O'Brien, Dave Creedon, John Lions, Sean Condon, Edward John O'Sullivan Trainer Jim Tough Barry Selectors Jack Leahy, Paddy Fox Collins, John Corkery, Teddy Creedon
