= Mossy O'Riordan =

Irish hurler

Personal information
- Native name: Muiris Ó Riordáin (Irish)
- Born: 1926 Blackrock, County Cork, Ireland
- Died: 27 August 2008 (aged 82) Newcastle, New South Wales, Australia
- Height: 6 ft 1 in (185 cm)

Sport
- Sport: Hurling
- Position: Right corner-forward
Club
- Years: Club
- Blackrock
Inter-county*
Years	County	Apps (scores)
1946-1952	Cork	18 (11-9)
Inter-county titles
- Munster titles: 3
- All-Irelands: 2
- NHL: 0
- *Inter County team apps and scores correct as of 17:41, 11 April 2015.

Maurice Francis "Mossy" O'Riordan (1926 – 27 August 2008) was an Irish hurler who played as a right corner-forward for the Cork senior team.

Born in Blackrock, County Cork, O'Riordan first played with the Cork senior team at the age of twenty. He made his debut during the 1946 championship. O'Riordan became a regular member of the starting fifteen and won two All-Ireland medals and three Munster medals. He was an All-Ireland runner-up on one occasion.

As a member of the Munster inter-provincial team on a number of occasions O'Riordan won two Railway Cup medals. At club level he played with Blackrock.

O'Riordan's brother, Gerry, was a four-time All-Ireland medallist with Cork.

Throughout his career O'Riordan made 18 championship appearances. He retired from inter-county hurling following the conclusion of the 1952 championship

== Playing career ==
=== Inter-county ===
O'Riordan made his senior championship debut for Cork on 9 June 1946 in a 2-9 to 2-1 Munster quarter-final defeat of Clare. He immediately became a regular member of the starting fifteen and later won his first Munster medal following a 3-8 to 1-3 defeat of Limerick. On 1 September 1946 Cork faced old rivals Kilkenny in the All-Ireland decider. While some had written off Cork's chances, they took an interval lead of four points. With ten minutes remaining Cork's lead was reduced to just two points, however, goals by O'Riordan and Joe Kelly secured a 7-6 to 3-8 victory. It was O'Riordan's first All-Ireland medal.

Cork retained their provincial dominance in 1947 with O'Riordan picking up a second winners' medal following a 2-6 to 2-3 defeat of Limerick once again. The subsequent All-Ireland final on 7 September 1947 was a repeat of the previous year with Kilkenny providing the opposition. The stakes were high for both sides as Cork were aiming for a record sixth championship in seven seasons while Kilkenny were aiming to avoid becoming the first team to lose three consecutive All-Ireland finals. In what has been described as one of the greatest deciders of all-time, little separated the two teams over the course if the hour. A Joe Kelly goal put Cork one point ahead with time almost up, however, Terry Leahy proved to be the hero of the day. He converted a free to level the sides again before sending over the match-winner from the subsequent puck-out. With that the game was over and Cork were beaten by 0-14 to 2-7. It was the fifth time that Kilkenny had pipped Cork by a single point in an All-Ireland final.

After a period of dominance by Tipperary between 1949 and 1951, Cork bounced back in 1952. A late Paddy Barry goal gave Cork a 1-11 to 2-6 defeat of four-in-a-row hopefuls Tipperary. It was O'Riordan's second Munster medal. On 7 September 1952 Cork faced Dublin in the All-Ireland decider. An appendicitis ruled Joe Hartnett out of the game, resulting in Willie John Daly being switched to centre-forward. Liam Dowling scored a vital goal in the first half to give Cork the interval lead. Dublin's attack collapsed in the second half as Dowling scored a second goal. The 2-14 to 0-7 victory gave O'Riordan his second All-Ireland medal.

== Biography ==
On 27 August 2008, Maurice (Mossie) O'Riordan died in Newcastle NSW (Australia), where he had lived for some 40 years, after a severe stroke. He was 82 years old. He is buried in East Maitland cemetery (NSW) with his wife, Molly (née Fennell), and his two sons Eoin and Sean.

== Honours ==
=== Team ===
Cork

- All-Ireland Senior Hurling Championship (2): 1946, 1952
- Munster Senior Hurling Championship (3): 1946, 1947, 1952

Munster

- Railway Cup (2): 1948, 1950
