= 1940–41 National Hurling League =

14th season of the National Hurling League

League details
- Dates: 6 October 1940 – 30 March 1941
- Teams: 10

League champions
- Winners: Cork (4th win)
- Captain: Connie Buckley

League runners-up
- Runners-up: Dublin
- Captain: Ned Wade

The 1940–41 National Hurling League was the 14th edition of the National Hurling League, which ran from 6 October 1940 to 30 March 1941.

The ten participating teams were Clare, Cork, Dublin, Galway, Kilkenny, Laois, Limerick, Tipperary, Waterford and Westmeath who were divided into two divisions of five teams. The participants agreed to play a four game format whereby each team would play each of their four rivals once with two points awarded for a win and one point awarded for a drawn game. The two teams with the most points in each division at the completion of the season would play a final, with the winners being declared National Hurling League champions.

Cork defeated Dublin by 4-11 to 2-7 in the final.

Cork also won the All-Ireland Championship in 1941, the fifth time that a team completed the league-championship double.

== National Hurling League ==
=== Division A ===
Pos	Team	Pld	W	D	L	F	A	Diff.	Pts	Notes
1	Cork	4	4	0	0	18-18	7-17	34	8	National League champions
2	Limerick	4	3	0	1	22-14	11-21	26	6	
3	Kilkenny	4	2	0	2	10-33	20-15	-12	4	
4	Clare	4	1	0	3	16-13	27-22	-42	2	
5	Waterford	4	0	0	4	13-13	14-19	-9	0	

=== Division B ===
Pos	Team	Pld	W	D	L	F	A	Diff.	Pts	Notes
1	Dublin	4	4	0	0	28-29	14-12	59	8	National League runners-up
2	Tipperary	4	3	0	1	19-12	15-11	13	6	
3	Westmeath	4	2	0	2	10-13	16-26	-31	4	
4	Galway	4	1	0	3	18-8	16-14	0	2	
5	Laois	4	0	0	4	11-12	25-11	-41	0	

=== Results ===
30 March 1941 Final	Cork	4-11 - 2-7	Dublin	Cork Athletic Grounds
		Report		Attendance: 15,000; Referee: M Hennessy
