= Joe Kelly (hurler) =

Irish hurler (1923–1994)

Personal information
- Native name: Seosamh Ó Ceallaigh (Irish)
- Born: 1923 Blackpool, Cork, Ireland
- Died: June 1994 (aged 71) Christchurch, New Zealand
- Occupation: Roman Catholic priest
- Height: 5 ft 10 in (178 cm)

Sport
- Sport: Hurling
- Position: Forward
Club
- Years: Club
- 1941–1949: Glen Rovers
Club titles
- Cork titles: 0
Inter-county
Years	County	Apps (scores)
1943–1947	Cork	15 (15–9)
Inter-county titles
- Munster titles: 3
- All-Irelands: 2
- NHL: 0

Fr. Joseph Kelly (1923 – June 1994) was an Irish hurler who played as a left corner-forward for the Cork senior team.

Kelly joined the team during the 1943 championship and later became a regular member of the starting fifteen until his retirement following the conclusion of the 1947 championship. During that time he won two All-Ireland medals and three Munster medals. Kelly was an All-Ireland runner-up on one occasion.

At club level Kelly played with the famous Glen Rovers.

== Playing career ==
=== Club ===
Kelly played his club hurling with the famous Glen Rovers club on the north side of Cork city. He enjoyed little success at minor level before joining the club’s senior team. In spite of the Glen going through a hugely successful period during the 1940s, Kelly helped the team to many championship titles but never played in a county final himself.

=== Inter-county ===
Kelly first came to prominence on the inter-county scene as a member of the Cork minor hurling team in 1941. He won a Munster medal that year following a 4–6 to 3–3 defeat of Tipperary. He later lined out in an All-Ireland decider against Kilkenny. A 5–2 to 2–2 score line gave Cork the victory and gave Kelly an All-Ireland Minor Hurling Championship medal.

By 1943 Kelly had joined the Cork senior team. He was unused substitute that year as Cork claimed both the Munster and All-Ireland crowns.

In 1944 Kelly made his championship debut as Cork were attempting to capture a fourth All-Ireland title in-a-row. No team in the history of the hurling championship had won more than three consecutive titles. The year got off to a good start when Cork defeated Limerick by 4–6 to 3–6 after a replay to give Kelly a first Munster medal. For the third time in four years Cork faced Dublin in an All-Ireland decider. Joe Kelly was the hero of the day and he contributed greatly to Cork's 2–13 to 1–2 victory. It was a first All-Ireland medal for Kelly.

Five-in-a-row proved to be a bridge too far for Cork, however, the team returned in 1946. A 3–8 to 1–3 defeat of Limerick gave Kelly his second Munster medal. Under the captaincy of Christy Ring, Cork subsequently faced old rivals Kilkenny in the All-Ireland final. While some had written off Cork's chances, they took an interval lead of four points. With ten minutes remaining Cork's lead was reduced to just two points, however, goals by Mossy O'Riordan and Kelly secured the victory. A 7–6 to 3–8 score line gave Kelly a second All-Ireland medal.

Cork retained their provincial dominance in 1947 with Kelly picking up a third winners' medal following a three-point victory over Limerick. The All-Ireland final was a repeat of the previous year with Kilkenny providing the opposition. The stakes were high for both sides as Cork were aiming for a record sixth championship in seven seasons while Kilkenny were aiming to avoid becoming the first team to lose three consecutive All-Ireland finals. In what has been described as one of the greatest deciders of all-time, little separated the two teams over the course if the hour. A Kelly goal put Cork one point ahead with time almost up, however, Terry Leahy proved to be the hero of the day. He converted a free to level the sides again before sending over the match-winner from the subsequent puck-out. With that the game was over and Kelly's side were beaten by 0–14 to 2–7. It was the fifth time that Kilkenny had pipped Cork by a single point in an All-Ireland final.

Kelly was ordained a priest in June 1949 and effectively brought his inter-county career to an official end. He emigrated to New Zealand in October of that year and spent the rest of his life ministering in Christchurch.

== Honours ==
=== Team ===
Cork

- All-Ireland Senior Hurling Championship (2): 1944, 1946
- Munster Senior Hurling Championship (3): 1944, 1946, 1947
- All-Ireland Minor Hurling Championship (1): 1941
- Munster Minor Hurling Championship (1): 1941
