= 1943 All-Ireland Senior Hurling Championship =

Championship details
- Dates: 2 May – 5 September 1943
- Teams: 17

All-Ireland champions
- Winning team: Cork (14th win)
- Captain: Mick Kennefick

All-Ireland Finalists
- Losing team: Antrim
- Captain: Jimmy Walsh

Provincial champions
- Munster: Cork
- Leinster: Kilkenny
- Ulster: Antrim
- Connacht: Not Played

Championship statistics
- No. matches played: 16
- Goals total: 118 (7.3 per game)
- Points total: 175 (10.9 per game)
- Top Scorer: Jim Langton (4–12)
- All-Star Team: See here

The 1943 All-Ireland Senior Hurling Championship was the 57th staging of the All-Ireland Senior Hurling Championship, the Gaelic Athletic Association's premier inter-county hurling tournament. The championship began on 2 May 1943 and ended on 5 September 1943.

The championship was won by Cork who secured the title following a 5–16 to 0–4 defeat of Antrim in the All-Ireland final. This was their 14th All-Ireland title.

Cork were also the defending champions and retained the title for the second successive year to become the fourth team to win the three in-a-row.

== Teams ==
=== Overview ===
Eight teams contested the Leinster championship, with Meath and Wicklow returning after absences. Six teams contested the Munster championship, with Kerry fielding a team for the first time after a long absence from the senior ranks. Galway, who faced no competition in their own province, entered the championship at the All-Ireland semi-final stage. The Ulster champions were permitted to enter the All-Ireland series for the first time.

=== Team summaries ===
Team	Colours	Most recent success		
Team	Colours	All-Ireland	Provincial	League
Antrim	Saffron and white		1940	
Clare	Saffron and blue	1914	1932	
Cork	Red and white	1942	1942	1940–41
Down	Red and black		1941	
Dublin	Navy and blue	1938	1942	1938–39
Galway	Maroon and white	1923	1922	1930–31
Kerry	Green and gold	1891	1891	
Kilkenny	Black and amber	1939	1940	1932–33
Laois	Blue and white	1915	1915	
Limerick	Green and white	1940	1940	1937–38
Meath	Green and gold			
Offaly	Green, white and gold			
Tipperary	Blue and gold	1937	1941	1927–28
Waterford	Blue and white		1938	
Westmeath	Maroon and white			
Wexford	Purple and gold	1910	1918	
Wicklow	Blue and white			

== Provincial championships ==
=== Leinster Senior Hurling Championship ===
2 May 1943 Quarter-final	Wicklow	1–1 – 3–9	Dublin	Wicklow

2 May 1943 Quarter-final	Kilkenny	4–9 – 3–4	Wexford	Nowlan Park

9 May 1043 Quarter-final	Laois	2–3 – 2–14	Offaly	O'Moore Park

16 May 1943 Quarter-final	Meath	6–7 – 5–1	Westmeath	St. Loman's Park

30 May 1943 Semi-final	Offaly	1–2 – 6–10	Kilkenny	St. Brendan's Park
				Referee: M Kelly

6 June 1943 Semi-final	Meath	1–5 – 8–1	Dublin	St. Loman's Park

4 July 1943 Final	Kilkenny	3–9 – 2–6	Dublin	Nowlan Park
	J Langton 1–5, T Murphy 1–1, J Kelly 1–0, S O'Brien 0–2, J Walsh 0–1.		C Downes 1–1, F White 1–0, T Treacy 0–2, T Leahy 0–1, L O'Sullivan 0–1.	Referee: E Long

=== Munster Senior Hurling Championship ===
First round

6 June 1943 First round	Clare	3–03 – 6–04	Limerick	Cusack Park, Ennis

13 June 1943 First round	Waterford	4–05 – 1–02	Tipperary	Fraher Field, Dungarvan
	Galvin 1–1, D Daly 1–0, Feeney 1–0, Wyse 1–0, W Barron 0–1, J Keane 0–1, C Moylan 0–1, V Baston 0–1.		M Maher 1–1, O'Brien 0–1.

Semi-finals

20 June 1943 Semi-final	Kerry	2–07 – 8–03	Cork	Ballyduff
	T Sullivan 1–1, J Walsh 1–0, N Scollard 0–2, T Corridan 0–2, P Purcell 0–1, F Kissane 0–1.		T O'Sullivan 4–0, M Brennan 2–1, J Lynch 1–1, C Ring 1–0, J Quirke 0–1.	Referee: J Roche (Limerick)

4 July 1943 Semi-final	Waterford	3–07 – 4–03	Limerick	Cork Athletic Grounds, Cork
	K Jeane 2–0, M Feeney 1–1, W Barron 0–1, C Moylan 0–2, Galvin 0–2, E Daly 0–1,		J Mackey 2–0, McMahon 1–0, Herbert 1–0, D Stokes 0–1, M Mackey 0–1, J Power 0–1.	Referee: J O'Regan (Cork)

Final

1 August 1943 Final	Cork	2–13 – 3–08	Waterford	Cork Athletic Grounds, Cork
	C Ring 1–3, J Young 1–1, J Lynch 0–3, B Murphy 0–3, M Kennefick 0–1, W Murphy 0–1, J Quirke 0–1.		M Hickey 1–1, W Barron 1–0, D Power 1–0, B Hoban 0–3, J Keane 0–1, C Moylan 0–1, E Daly 0–1, M Hayes 0–1.	Attendance: 15,000; Referee: M Hennessy (Clare)

=== Ulster Senior Hurling Championship ===
13 June 1943 Final	Antrim	6–8 – 2–0	Down	Corrigan Park

== All-Ireland Senior Hurling Championship ==
4 July 1943 Quarter-final	Antrim	7–00 – 6–2	Galway	Corrigan Park

1 August 1943 Semi-final	Antrim	3–3 – 1–6	Kilkenny	Corrigan Park
				Referee: JJ Stuart (Dublin)

5 September 1943 Final	Cork	5–16 – 0–4	Antrim	Croke Park
				Attendance: 48,843; Referee: JJ Stuart (Dublin)

== Championship statistics ==
=== Scoring ===
- Widest winning margin: 27 points
  - Cork 5–16 – 0–4 Antrim (All-Ireland final, 5 September 1943)
- Most goals in a match: 13
  - Antrim 7–0 – 6–2 Galway (All-Ireland quarter-final, 4 July 1943)

== Sources ==
- Corry, Eoghan, The GAA Book of Lists (Hodder Headline Ireland, 2005).
- Donegan, Des, The Complete Handbook of Gaelic Games (DBA Publications Limited, 2005).
- Horgan, Tim, Christy Ring: Hurling's Greatest (The Collins Press, 2007).
- Nolan, Pat, Flashbacks: A Half Century of Cork Hurling (The Collins Press, 2000).
- Sweeney, Éamonn, Munster Hurling Legends (The O'Brien Press, 2002).
