= 1947 All-Ireland Senior Hurling Championship =

Championship details
- Dates: 1 June – 7 September 1947
- Teams: 13

All-Ireland champions
- Winning team: Kilkenny (13th win)
- Captain: Dan Kennedy

All-Ireland Finalists
- Losing team: Cork
- Captain: Seán Condon

Provincial champions
- Munster: Cork
- Leinster: Kilkenny
- Ulster: Not Played
- Connacht: Not Played

Championship statistics
- No. matches played: 12
- Goals total: 69 (5.30 per game)
- Points total: 178 (13.69 per game)
- Top Scorer: Christy Ring (3–15)
- All-Star Team: See here

The All-Ireland Senior Hurling Championship 1947 was the 61st series of the All-Ireland Senior Hurling Championship, Ireland's premier hurling knock-out competition. Kilkenny won the championship, beating Cork 0–14 to 2–7 in the final at Croke Park, Dublin.

== Format ==
Leinster Championship

Quarter-finals: (2 matches) These were two matches between the first four teams drawn from the province. Two teams were eliminated at this stage while the two winning teams advanced to the semi-finals.

Semi-finals: (2 matches) The winners of the two quarter-finals joined the two remaining Leinster teams to make up the semi-final pairings. Two teams were eliminated at this stage while the two winning teams advanced to the final.

Final: (1 match) The winners of the two semi-finals contested this game. One team was eliminated at this stage while the winning team advanced to the All-Ireland semi-finals.

Munster Championship

Quarter-final: (1 match) This was a single match between the first two teams drawn from the province. One team was eliminated at this stage while the winning team advanced to the semi-finals.

Semi-finals: (2 matches) The winner of the lone quarter-final joined the other three Munster teams to make up the semi-final pairings. Two teams were eliminated at this stage while the two winning teams advanced to the final.

Final: (1 match) The winners of the two semi-finals contested this game. One team was eliminated at this stage while the winning team advanced to the All-Ireland semi-finals.

All-Ireland Championship

Semi-finals: (2 matches) The two provincial winners were paired on opposite sides with Galway and Antrim making up the four semi-final teams. Two teams were eliminated at this stage while the two winning teams advanced to the final.

Final: (1 match) The winners of the two semi-finals contested this game with the winners being declared All-Ireland champions.

== Provincial championships ==
=== Leinster Senior Hurling Championship ===
June 1
First round

Wexford	3–12 – 2–10	Laois
T Russell 1–7, Padge Kehoe 1–3, Doolin 1–0, Murphy 0–2.		J Styles 1–1, Ryan 0–4, Dunne 1–0, Baggott 0–3, Cranny 0–1, Aherne 0–1.

Nowlan Park, Kilkenny

June 8
First round

Offaly	7–2 – 2–6	Westmeath
Purcell 3–0, Sheeran 2–0, Parlon 2–0, Burke 0–2,		Leonard 1–2, Daly 1–2, Fitzsimons 0–2.

St. Brendan's Park, Birr

June 29
Semi-final

Kilkenny	5–11 – 3–8	Wexford
P O'Brien 2–2, J Kelly 2–0, J Langton 1–2, S Downey 0–3, T Walton 0–2, J Heffernan 0–1, L Reidy 0–1.		T Murphy 2–0, T Russell 0–5, Darcy 1–0, M Heffernan 0–3.

Nowlan Park, Kilkenny

June 29
Semi-final

Dublin	5–6 – 0–3	Offaly
F Cummins 2–0, J Prior 1–0, T Herbert 1–0, J Gargan 1–2, J Kennedy 0–2, A O'Dwyer 0–1, S Óg Ceallacháin 0–1.		Dillon 0–1, Walsh 0–1, Sheerin 0–1.

O'Moore Park, Portlaoise

July 13
Final

Kilkenny	7–10 – 3–6	Dublin
T Leahy 3–3, P Lennon 2–0, T Walton 1–2, S Downey 0–4, P O'Brien 1–0, J Heffernan 0–1.		M Hassett 0–6, J Prior 1–0, J Kennedy 1–0, F Cummins 1–0.

O'Moore Park, Portlaoise

=== Munster Senior Hurling Championship ===
June 15
Quarter-final

Cork	4–9 – 0–4	Clare
M O'Riordan 3–1, C Ring 0–6, C Murphy 1–0, P Healy 0–1, J O'Riordan 0–1.		Daly 0–1, Murphy 0–1, Solan 0–1, Frost 0–1.

Gaelic Grounds, Limerick

June 22
Semi-final

Limerick	6–8 – 2–3	Tipperary
D Stokes 0–7, T O'Brien 2–0, J Mackey 2–0, D McCarthy 1–1, J Power 1–0.		J Coffey 1–0, T Ryan 1–0, J Dwyer 0–3.

Cork Athletic Grounds, Cork

June 29
Semi-final

Cork	3–10 – 1–5	Waterford
C Ring 2–7, J Kelly 1–1, D O'Riordan 0–1, J Lynch 0–1,		V Baston 0–4, Daly 1–0, Feeney 0–1.

Clonmel GAA Ground, Clonmel

July 20
Final

Cork	2–6 – 2–3	Limerick
J Kelly 1–0, C Ring 1–1, S Condon 0–4, W Murphy 0–1.		T O'Brien 1–0, D Stokes 1–3.

Thurles Sportsfield, Thurles

== All-Ireland Senior Hurling Championship ==
=== Bracket ===
Semi-finals; 27 July / 3 August
Kilkenny	2–09
Galway	1–11
Cork	7–10
Antrim	0–05

All-Ireland final 7 September
Kilkenny	0–14
Cork	2–07

=== All-Ireland semi-finals ===
July 27
Semi-final

Kilkenny	2–9 – 1–11	Galway
T. Walton (0–4), J. Langton (0–4), L. Reidy (1–0), P. O'Brien (1–0), T. Leahy (0–1).		J. Gallagher (1–6), H. Gordon (0–2), J. Killeen (0–2), Gardiner (0–1).

St. Brendan's Park, Birr

August 3
Semi-final

Cork	7–10 – 0–5	Antrim
S Condon 3–5, J Young 2–0, G. O'Riordan 1–1, M O'Riordan 1–0, C Murphy 0–2, J Lynch 0–2.		J Cormican 0–1, F Fleming 0–1, McAllister 0–1, J Bateson 0–1, J Mullan 0–1.

Croke Park, Dublin

=== All-Ireland Final ===
September 7
Final

Kilkenny	0–14 – 2–7	Cork
T Leahy 0–6, J Langton 0–3, T Walton 0–2, S Downey 0–1, J Mulcahy 0–1, L Reidy 0–1.		J Kelly 1–1, S Condon 0–4, M O'Riordan 1–0, J Lynch 0–1, C Ring 0–1.

Croke Park, Dublin
Attendance: 61,510
Referee: P. Purcell (Tipperary)

== Championship statistics ==
=== Top scorers ===
Overall

Rank	Player	County	Tally	Total
1	Christy Ring	Cork	3–15	24
2	Seán Condon	Cork	3–13	22
3	Mossy O'Riordan	Cork	5-01	16
3	Terry Leahy	Kilkenny	3–10	16
4	Tim Russell	Wexford	1–12	15
5	Paddy O'Brien	Kilkenny	4-02	14
6	Dick Stokes	Limerick	1–10	13
7	Jim Langton	Kilkenny	1-09	12
8	Joe Kelly	Cork	3-02	11
9	Tom Walton	Kilkenny	1–10	13

In a single game

Rank	Player	County	Tally	Total	Opposition
1	Seán Condon	Cork	3-05	14	Antrim
2	Christy Ring	Cork	2-07	13	Waterford
3	Terry Leahy	Kilkenny	3-03	12	Dublin
4	Mossy O'Riordan	Cork	3-01	10	Clare
4	Tim Russell	Wexford	1-07	10	Laois
5	Séamus Purcell	Offaly	3-00	9	Westmeath
5	Josie Gallagher	Galway	1-06	9	Kilkenny
6	Paddy O'Brien	Kilkenny	2-02	8	Wexford
7	Dick Stokes	Limerick	0-07	7	Tipperary

=== Scoring ===
- Widest winning margin: 26 points
  - Cork 7–10 : 0–5 Antrim (All-Ireland semi-final, 3 August 1947)
- Most goals in a match: 10
  - Kilkenny 7–10 : 3–6 Dublin (Leinster final, 13 July 1947)
- Most points in a match: 22
  - Wexford 3–12 : 2–10 Laois (Leinster quarter-final, 1 June 1947)
- Most goals by one team in a match: 7
  - Offaly 7–2 : 2–6 Westmeath (Leinster quarter-final, 8 June 1947)
  - Kilkenny 7–10 : 3–6 Dublin (Leinster final, 13 July 1947)
  - Cork 7–10 : 0–5 Antrim (All-Ireland semi-final, 3 August 1947)
- Most goals scored by a losing team: 3
  - Wexford 3–8 : 5–11 Kilkenny (Leinster semi-final, 29 June 1947)
  - Dublin 3–6 : 7–10 Kilkenny (Leinster final, 13 July 1947)
- Most points scored by a losing team: 11
  - Galway 1–11 : 2–9 Kilkenny (All-Ireland semi-final, 27 July 1947)

=== Debutantes ===
The following players made their debut in the 1947 championship:

Player	Team	Date	Opposition	Game
Joe Kenny	Cork	June 15	Clare	Munster quarter-final

== Sources ==
- Corry, Eoghan, The GAA Book of Lists (Hodder Headline Ireland, 2005).
- Donegan, Des, The Complete Handbook of Gaelic Games (DBA Publications Limited, 2005).
