= 1944 All-Ireland Senior Hurling Championship =

Championship details
- Dates: May – September 1944
- Teams: 16

All-Ireland champions
- Winning team: Cork (15th win)
- Captain: Seán Condon

All-Ireland Finalists
- Losing team: Dublin
- Captain: Mick Butler

Provincial champions
- Munster: Cork
- Leinster: Dublin
- Ulster: Antrim
- Connacht: Not Played

Championship statistics
- No. matches played: 17
- Top Scorer: Joe Kelly (7–5)
- All-Star Team: See here

The All-Ireland Senior Hurling Championship of 1944 was the 58th staging of Ireland's premier hurling knock-out competition. Cork won the championship, beating Dublin 2–13 to 1–2 in the final at Croke Park, Dublin.

== Pre-championship ==
=== Four-in-a-row ===
Coming into the 1944 championship Cork were presented with a chance to achieve something that had never been done before. Having captured their third All-Ireland title in-a-row the previous year, Cork's hurlers were primed to go one better and secure an unprecedented fourth successive All-Ireland title. The 'four-in-a-row' had already been captured by the footballers of Wexford (1915–18) and Kerry (1929–32), however, no hurling team had ever bested three-in-a-row. That feat had been achieved several times before with Cork, Tipperary and Kilkenny all claiming famous trebles. None of those teams, however, reached a fourth successive All-Ireland final as they were all beaten in the provincial series of games.

== Format ==
=== Leinster Championship ===
First round: (2 matches) These are two lone matches between the first four teams drawn from the province of Leinster. Two teams are eliminated at this stage, while the two winners advance to the semi-finals.

Semi-finals: (2 matches) The winners of the two first round games join the other two Leinster teams to make up the semi-final pairings. Two teams are eliminated at this stage, while the two winners advance to the final.

Final: (1 match) The winners of the two semi-finals contest this game. One team is eliminated at this stage, while the winners advance to the All-Ireland semi-final.

=== Munster Championship ===
First round: (1 match) This is a lone match between the first two teams drawn from the province of Munster. One team is eliminated at this stage, while the winners advance to the semi-finals.

Semi-finals: (2 matches) The winners of the first round game join the other three Munster teams to make up the semi-final pairings. Two teams are eliminated at this stage, while the two winners advance to the final.

Final: (1 match) The winners of the two semi-finals contest this game. One team is eliminated at this stage, while the winners advance to the All-Ireland semi-final.

=== Ulster Championship ===
Semi-finals: (2 matches) The four Ulster teams are drawn against each other in two semi-finals. Two teams are eliminated at this stage, while the two winners advance to the final.

Final: (1 match) The winners of the two semi-finals contest this game. One team is eliminated at this stage, while the winners advance to the All-Ireland semi-final.

=== All-Ireland Championship ===
Semi-finals: (2 matches) The Munster and Leinster champions are paired in opposite semi-finals while Galway enter the championship at this stage. The emi-final pairings are Munster champions versus Galway and Leinster champions versus Ulster champions. Two teams are eliminated at this stage, while the two winners advance to the All-Ireland final.

Final: (1 match) The two semi-final winners will contest the All-Ireland final.

== Teams ==
=== General information ===
Sixteen counties will compete in the All-Ireland Senior Hurling Championship: one team in the Connacht Senior Hurling Championship, six teams in the Leinster Senior Hurling Championship, five teams in the Munster Senior Hurling Championship and four teams in the Ulster Senior Hurling Championship.

County	Last provincial title	Last championship title	Position in 1943 Championship
Antrim	1943	—	Runners-up
Clare	1932	1914	Munster quarter-finals
Cork	1943	1943	Champions
Donegal	1932	—	—
Down	1942	—	Ulster runners-up
Dublin	1942	1938	Leinster runners-up
Galway	1922	1923	Semi-finals
Kilkenny	1943	1939	Semi-finals
Limerick	1940	1940	Munster semi-finals
Meath	—	—	Leinster semi-finals
Monaghan	1915	—	—
Offaly	—	—	Leinster semi-finals
Tipperary	1941	1937	Munster quarter-finals
Waterford	1938	—	Munster runners-up
Westmeath	—	—	Leinster quarter-finals
Wexford	1918	1910	Leinster quarter-finals

== Provincial championship ==
=== Leinster Senior Hurling Championship ===
==== Bracket ====
First round 7 / 14 May
Westmeath	5–03
Offaly	5–05
Meath	1–11
Dublin	6–10

Semi-finals; 18 June
Wexford	6–04
Kilkenny	4–06
Offaly	1–04
Dublin	10–07

Final; 23 July
Wexford	3–03
Dublin	4–07

==== First round ====
May 7, 1944
First Round

Westmeath	5–3 – 5–5	Offaly

Cusack Park, Mullingar

May 14, 1944
First Round

Meath	1–11 – 6–10	Dublin

St. Loman's Park, Trim

==== Semi-finals ====
June 18, 1944
Semi-Final

Dublin	10–7 – 1–4	Offaly

O'Connor Park, Tullamore

June 18, 1944
Semi-Final

Wexford	6–4 – 4–6	Kilkenny

O'Kennedy Park, New Ross

==== Leinster Final ====
July 23, 1944
Final

Dublin	4–7 – 3–3	Wexford
H Gray 1–3, C Downes 1–2, N Wade 1–0, P Maher 1–0, T Leahy 0–1, M Hassett 0–1.		N Rackard 2–0, P Boggan 1–1, M Heffernan 0–2.

Nowlan Park, Kilkenny

=== Munster Senior Hurling Championship ===
May 28, 1944
First Round

Tipperary	3–5 – 1–7	Waterford
Leahy 1–2, Joy 1–0, Larkin 1–0, T Bourke 0–2, W O'Donnell 0–1.		Eade 1–0, Hickey 0–3, Goode 0–1, Barron 0–1, D Power 0–1, V Baston 0–1.

Clonmel

June 11, 1944
Semi-Final

Limerick	5–9 – 4–1	Clare
D Stokes 2–5, M Mackey 2–2, P McCarthy 1–1, P Fitzgerald 0–1.		O'Brien 2–0, W McAllister 1–0, Frost 1–0, Hogan 0–1.

Gaelic Grounds, Limerick

June 25, 1944
Semi-Final

Cork	1–9 – 1–3	Tipperary
J Kelly 1–0, C Ring 0–3, J Lynch 0–2, J Quirke 0–2, S Condon 0–1, M Kennefick 0–1.		O'Donnell 1–1, Bourke 0–1, Flanagan 0–1.

Gaelic Grounds, Limerick
Attendance: 11,000

July 16, 1944
Final

Cork	6–7 – 4–13	Limerick
J Kelly 2–2, J Quirke 3–0, J Morrison 1–0, J Lynch 0–2, S Condon 0–1, C Cottrell 0–1, C Ring 0–1.		M Mackey 2–4, D Stokes 1–6, J Clohessy 1–1, J Mackey 1–0, P McCarthy 0–2.

Thurles Sportsfield, Thurles
Attendance: 19,950

July 30, 1944
Final Replay

Cork	4–6 – 3–6	Limerick
J Morrison 2–0, C Ring 1–0, J Kelly 1–0, J Lynch 0–2, S Condon 0–2, J Quirke 0–2.		J Mackey 2–0, M Mackey 1–1, D Stokes 0–4, P McCarthy 0–1.

Thurles Sportsfield, Thurles
Attendance: 18,000

=== Ulster Senior Hurling Championship ===
July 9, 1944
Semi-Final

Antrim	9–7 – 0–3	Donegal

Celtic Park, Derry

July 16, 1944
Semi-Final

Monaghan	3–7 – 1–10	Down

St. Tiernach's Park, Clones

July 31, 1944
Final

Antrim	5–7 – 6–4	Monaghan

Corrigan Park, Belfast

August 6, 1944
Final Replay

Antrim	7–3 – 0–1	Monaghan

Corrigan Park, Belfast

== All-Ireland Senior Hurling Championship ==
=== Bracket ===
Semi-finals; 13 August
Cork	1–10
Galway	3–03
Dublin	6–12
Antrim	3–01

All-Ireland final 3 September
Cork	2–13
Dublin	1–02

=== All-Ireland semi-finals ===
August 13, 1944
Semi-Final

Cork	1–10 – 3–3	Galway

Cusack Park, Ennis
Attendance: 9,800

August 13, 1944
Semi-Final

Dublin	6–12 – 3–1	Antrim

Corrigan Park, Belfast

=== All-Ireland final ===
September 3, 1944
Final

Cork	2–13 – 1–2	Dublin

Croke Park, Dublin
Attendance: 26,896
Referee: M. Hennessy (Clare)

Cork	Dublin

== Championship statistics ==
=== Scoring ===
- Widest winning margin: 30 points
  - Dublin 10–7 : 1–4 Offaly (Leinster semi-final)
- Most goals in a match: 11
  - Dublin 10–7 : 1–4 Offaly (Leinster semi-final)
  - Antrim 5–7 : 6–4 Monaghan (Ulster final)
- Most points in a match: 21
  - Dublin 6–10 : 1–11 Meath (Leinster first round)
- Most goals by one team in a match: 10
  - Dublin 10–7 : 1–4 Offaly (Leinster semi-final)
- Most goals scored by a losing team: 5
  - Westmeath 5–3 : 5–5 Offaly (Leinster first round)
- Most points scored by a losing team: 11
  - Meath 1–11 : 6–10 Dublin (Leinster first round)

=== Miscellaneous ===
- The Munster final went to a replay for the first time since 1940. On that occasion both Cork and Limerick were also the two teams involved. Limerick won the replay on that occasion.
- For the first time since 1938 a team other than Kilkenny or Dublin qualified for the Leinster final. Wexford's first victory against Kilkenny since 1906 ensured the county appeared in the provincial decider for the first time since 1916.
- This was Monaghan's first appearance in the Ulster final since 1916. The team last won the provincial decider in 1915.
- The Ulster final went to a replay for the first time since 1914. On that occasion Antrim and Monaghan were also the teams involved. Monaghan won the replay on that occasion.
- A Munster team captured the All-Ireland title for a fifth consecutive season.
- Cork became the first team to win four All-Ireland titles in a row. Nine players from the team contributed to all four final victories. This record stood until 2009 when Kilkenny equalled the feat with their own four-in-a-row.

== Player facts ==
=== Debutantes ===
The following players made their début in the 1944 championship:

Player	Team	Date	Opposition	Game
Joe Kelly	Cork	June 25	Tipperary	Munster semi-final

=== Retirees ===
The following players played their last game in the 1944 championship:

Player	Team	Date	Opposition	Game	Début
Mick Kennefick	Cork	June 25	Tipperary	Munster semi-final	1942

== Bibliography ==
- Corry, Eoghan, The GAA Book of Lists (Hodder Headline Ireland, 2005).
- Donegan, Des, The Complete Handbook of Gaelic Games (DBA Publications Limited, 2005).
- Sweeney, Éamonn, Munster Hurling Legends (The O'Brien Press, 2002).
