= 1942 All-Ireland Senior Hurling Championship =

Championship details
- Dates: 3 May – 3 September 1942
- Teams: 12

All-Ireland champions
- Winning team: Cork (13th win)
- Captain: Jack Lynch

All-Ireland Finalists
- Losing team: Dublin
- Captain: Frank White

Provincial champions
- Munster: Cork
- Leinster: Dublin
- Ulster: Not Played
- Connacht: Not Played

Championship statistics
- No. matches played: 11
- Goals total: 82 (7.45 per game)
- Points total: 124 (11.27 per game)
- Top Scorer: Christy Ring (0–19)
- All-Star Team: See here

The 1942 All-Ireland Senior Hurling Championship was the 56th staging of the All-Ireland Senior Hurling Championship, the Gaelic Athletic Association's premier inter-county hurling tournament. The championship began on 3 May 1942 and ended on 3 September 1942.

The championship was won by Cork who secured the title following a 2–14 to 3–4 defeat of Dublin in the All-Ireland final. This was their 13th All-Ireland title.

Cork were also the defending champions and retained the title for the fifth time in their history.

== Teams ==
=== Overview ===
Six teams contested the Leinster championship while five teams contested the Munster championship. Galway, who faced no competition in their own province, entered the championship at the All-Ireland semi-final stage. No team from Ulster participated in the senior championship.

=== Team summaries ===
Team	Colours	Most recent success		
Team	Colours	All-Ireland	Provincial	League
Clare	Saffron and blue	1914	1932	
Cork	Red and white	1941	1931	1940–41
Dublin	Navy and blue	1938	1941	1938–39
Galway	Maroon and white	1923	1922	1930–31
Kilkenny	Black and amber	1939	1940	1932–33
Laois	Blue and white	1915	1915	
Limerick	Green and white	1940	1940	1937–38
Offaly	Green, white and gold			
Tipperary	Blue and gold	1937	1941	1927–28
Waterford	Blue and white		1938	
Westmeath	Maroon and white			
Wexford	Purple and gold	1910	1918	

== Provincial championships ==
=== Leinster Senior Hurling Championship ===
3 May 1942 Quarter-final	Offaly	6–5 – 4–3	Westmeath	O'Connor Park

3 May 1942 Quarter-final	Laois	5–3 – 6–2	Wexford	O'Moore Park

31 May 1942 Semi-final	Wexford	4–4 – 5–5	Kilkenny	O'Kennedy Park

31 May 1942 Semi-final	Offaly	1–4 – 4–7	Dublin	St. Brendan's Park

28 June 1942 Final	Kilkenny	1–4 – 4–8	Dublin	Nowlan Park
	J Phelan 1–0, J Walsh 0–2, J Heffernan 0–1, J Kelly 0–1.		M McDonnell 1–6, P McMahon 1–1, J Hickey 1–0, P Kennedy 1–0, S Skehal 0–1.

=== Munster Senior Hurling Championship ===
First round

31 May 1942 First round	Waterford	2–05 – 4–04	Limerick	Cork Athletic Grounds, Cork
	Duggan 1–1, Goode 1–0, Campbell 0–2, Galvin 0–1, W Barron 0–1.		J Roche 2–0, M Mackey 1–1, Foley 1–0, D Stokes 0–2, J Mackey 0–1.

Semi-finals

17 May 1942 Semi-final	Tipperary	5–13 – 1–03	Clare	Gaelic Grounds, Limerick
	D Doorley 2–2, J Looby 1–2, B O'Donnell 1–1, M Bourke 0–4, P Flanagan 1–0, T Treacy 0–3, J Ryan 0–1.		Fleming 1–0, R McNamara 0–2, M O'Halloran 0–1.

21 June 1942 Semi-final	Limerick	5–03 – 4–08	Cork	Gaelic Grounds, Limerick
	D Stokes 2–0, J Roche 1–0, Fitzgerald 1–0, J Mackey 1–0, M Mackey 0–2, P Cregan 0–1.		J Quirke 3–0, D Beckett 1–0, C Ring 0–3, S Condon 0–1, DJ Buckley 0–1, C Tobin 0–1, M Kennefick 0–1.	Attendance: 6,030

Final

12 July 1942 Final	Cork	4–15 – 4–01	Tipperary	Cork Athletic Grounds, Cork
	C Ring 0–8, C Tobin 2–1, J Quirke 1–1, M Kennefick 1–1, S Condon 0–2, D Beckett 0–1, J Young 0–1.		T Treacy 2–1, J Ryan 1–0, M Bourke 1–0.	Attendance: 24.320

== All-Ireland Senior Hurling Championship ==
Semi-final

26 July 1942 Semi-final	Cork	6–08 – 2–04	Galway	Gaelic Grounds, Limerick
			Forde 1–1, Flaherty 1–0, S Thornton 0–1, Boyle 0–1, P Thornton 0–1,	Referee: M Hennessy (Clare)

Final

6 September 1942 Final	Cork	2–14 – 3–04	Dublin	Croke Park, Dublin
	J Quirke 1–2, D Beckett 1–0, C Ring 0–3, J Lynch 0–3, S Condon 0–2, M Kennefick 0–2, DJ Buckley 0–1, C Tobin 0–1.		M McDonnell 1–1, D Davitt 1–0, E O'Brien 1–0, N Wade 0–2, S Skehal 0–1.	Attendance: 27,313; Referee: M Hennessy (Clare)

== Championship statistics ==
=== Scoring ===
- Widest winning margin: 22 points
  - Tipperary 5–13 : 1–3 Clare (Munster semi-final, 17 May 1942)
- Most goals in a match: 11
  - Laois 5–3 : 6–2 Wexford (Leinster quarter-final, 3 May 1942)
- Most points in a match: 18
  - Cork 2–14 : 3–4 Dublin (All-Ireland final, 3 September 1942)
- Most goals by one team in a match: 6
  - Offaly 6–5 : 4–3 Westmeath (Leinster quarter-final, 2 May 1942)
  - Wexford 6–2 : 5–3 Laois (Leinster quarter-final, 3 May 1942)
  - Cork 6–8 : 2–4 Galway (Leinster quarter-final, 26 July 1942)
- Most goals scored by a losing team: 5
  - Laois 5–3 : 6–2 Wexford (Leinster quarter-final, 3 May 1942)
  - Limerick 5–3 : 4–8 Cork (Munster semi-final, 21 June 1942)
- Most points scored by a losing team: 4
  - Wexford 4–4 : 5–5 Kilkenny (Leinster semi-final, 31 May 1942)
  - Offaly 1–4 : 4–7 Dublin (Leinster semi-final, 31 May 1942)
  - Galway 2–4 : 6–8 Cork (All-Ireland semi-final, 26 July 1942)
  - Dublin 3–4 : 2–14 Cork (All-Ireland final, 3 September 1942)

== Roll of Honour ==
- Cork – 13 (1942)
- Kilkenny – 12 (1939)
- Tipperary – 12 (1937)
- Limerick – 6 (1940)
- Dublin – 6 (1938)
- Galway – 1 (1923)
- Laois – 1 (1915)
- Clare – 1 (1914)
- Wexford – 1 (1910)
- London – 1 (1901)
- Kerry – 1 (1891)

== Sources ==
- Corry, Eoghan, The GAA Book of Lists (Hodder Headline Ireland, 2005).
- Donegan, Des, The Complete Handbook of Gaelic Games (DBA Publications Limited, 2005).
- Horgan, Tim, Christy Ring: Hurling's Greatest (The Collins Press, 2007).
- Nolan, Pat, Flashbacks: A Half Century of Cork Hurling (The Collins Press, 2000).
- Sweeney, Éamonn, Munster Hurling Legends (The O'Brien Press, 2002).
