= Terry Leahy (hurler) =

Irish hurler

Personal information
- Native name: Toirealaigh Ó Laocha (Irish)
- Nickname: Terry
- Born: 9 March 1917 Urlingford, County Kilkenny, Ireland
- Died: November 1988 (aged 71) The Bronx, New York City, United States
- Occupation: NY transit worker
- Height: 6 ft 1 in (185 cm)

Sport
- Sport: Hurling
- Position: Forward
Clubs
- Years: Club
- Emeralds; Young Irelands; Faughs; Kilkenny
Club titles
- Dublin titles: 6
Inter-county*
Years	County	Apps (scores)
1937–1949	Kilkenny	19 (10–29)
Inter-county titles
- Leinster titles: 6
- All-Irelands: 2
- NHL: 0
- *Inter County team apps and scores correct as of 15:43, 2 April 2018.

Thaddeus Leahy (9 March 1917 – November 1988) was an Irish sportsperson. He played hurling at various times with his local clubs Emeralds in Kilkenny and Faughs in Dublin. Leahy was also a member of both the Kilkenny and Dublin senior inter-county teams from 1938 until 1949.

== Playing career ==
=== Club ===
Leahy played his club hurling with his local Emeralds club in Urlingford, however, he enjoyed little success with the club and never won a senior county title. Leahy later played club hurling with the Faughs club in Dublin and he won seven county titles.

=== Inter-county ===
Leahy first came to prominence on the inter-county scene as a member of the Kilkenny minor team in the 1930s. He won a Leinster title in this grade in 1935 before later lining out in the minor championship decider. Tipperary provided the opposition on this occasion, however, victory went to Kilkenny and Leahy collected an All-Ireland minor medal.

By 1937 Leahy had joined the Kilkenny senior inter-county team. That year he captured his first senior Leinster title as Kilkenny defeated Westmeath in the provincial decider. 'The Cats' later took on Tipperary in an historic All-Ireland final at FitzGerald Stadium in Killarney, however, Leahy's side were trounced on a score line of 3–11 to 0–3. Two years later in 1939 Leahy won a second Leinster title before lining out in his second championship decider. The game itself is remembered as the 'thunder and lightning final' as the climax of the game was played in a fierce thunderstorm. With the game going into injury time Cork scored an equalising goal. Leahy, however, proved to be the hero of the game as he scored the winning point giving Kilkenny a 2–7 to 3–3 victory. Leahy had secured his first All-Ireland medal. In 1940 Leahy won histhird provincial medal and later lined out in his third All-Ireland final. Limerick provided the opposition on that occasion, however, Kilkenny, the reigning champions, fell to the Munstermen on a score line of 3–7 to 1–7.

For the next few years Kilkenny were not allowed to participate in the championship due to the outbreak of a foot-and-mouth epidemic in the county. Because of this it would be 1946 before Leahy captured a fourth Leinster medal. He later lined out in his fourth championship decider with Cork providing the opposition once again. On the day Kilkenny were overwhelmed by 'the Rebels' and Leahy ended up on the losing side. In 1947 he added a fifth and final Leinster medal to his collection. For the second year running Cork provided the opposition. The stakes were high for Kilkenny as they faced the prospect of becoming the first county to lose three consecutive championship deciders. In a game described as the greatest All-Ireland final of all-time Leahy scored six points and helped his native-county to capture a 0–14 to 2–7 victory. He scored both the equalising and the winning point. Eight years after winning his first Leahy had finally added a second All-Ireland medal to his collection. He continued hurling with Kilkenny until 1949.

=== Provincial ===
Leahy also lined out with Leinster in the inter-provincial hurling competition, however, he never won a Railway Cup medal.
