= 1946 All-Ireland Senior Hurling Championship =

Championship details
- Dates: 28 April - 1 September 1946
- Teams: 17

All-Ireland champions
- Winning team: Cork (16th win)
- Captain: Christy Ring

All-Ireland Finalists
- Losing team: Kilkenny
- Captain: Jack Mulcahy

Provincial champions
- Munster: Cork
- Leinster: Kilkenny
- Ulster: Antrim
- Connacht: Not Played

Championship statistics
- No. matches played: 16
- Top Scorer: Paddy O'Brien (7–3)
- All-Star Team: See here

The All-Ireland Senior Hurling Championship 1946 was the 60th series of the All-Ireland Senior Hurling Championship, Ireland's premier hurling knock-out competition. Cork won the championship, beating Kilkeny 7–5 to 3–8 in the final at Croke Park, Dublin.

== Format ==
The All-Ireland Senior Hurling Championship was run on a provincial basis as usual. All games were played on a knockout basis, whereby once a team lost they were eliminated from the championship. The format for the All-Ireland series of games ran as follows:

- The winners of the Munster Championship advanced directly to one of the All-Ireland semi-finals.
- The winners of the Leinster Championship advanced directly to the second All-Ireland semi-final.
- Antrim, the representatives from the Ulster Championship, were drawn to play the Leinster champions in the All-Ireland semi-final.
- Galway, a team who faced no competition in the Connacht Championship, automatically advanced to the All-Ireland semi-final where they were drawn to play the Munster champions.

== Provincial championships ==
=== Leinster Senior Hurling Championship ===
April 28, 1946
First round

Offaly	5–3 – 1–8	Laois
Purcell (2–0), Burke (1–1), Daly (1–0), Dillon (1–0), Shine (0–2).		Kelly (1–0), Baggot (0–3), Brennan (0–2), Cranny (0–2), Kenna (0–1).

St. Brendan's Park, Birr

June 2, 1946
Quarterfinal

Westmeath	3–9 – 6–8	Offaly

Cusack Park, Mullingar

June 2, 1946
Semifinal

Wexford	2–2 – 7–4	Kilkenny

O'Kennedy Park, New Ross

June 23, 1946
Semifinal

Dublin	4–6 – 3–4	Offaly
N. Wade (2–4), J. Prior (1–0), Daly (1–0), H. Gray (0–2),		Sheeran (1–1), Walsh (1–0), ? (1–0), Shine (0–1), Burke (0–1), Ryan (0–1).

O'Moore Park, Portlaoise

July 7, 1946
Final

Kilkenny	3–8 – 1–12	Dublin
T. Walton (2–0), J. Langton (0–4), J. Gargan (1–0), S. O'Brien (0–2), P. O'Brien (0–1), T. Leahy (0–1).		T. Herbert (0–4), N. Daly (1–0), N. Wade (0–3), H. Gray (0–2), S. Óg Ó Ceallacháin (0–2), P. O'Brien (0–1).

Croke Park, Dublin

=== Munster Senior Hurling Championship ===
June 9, 1946
Quarterfinal

Cork	2–9 – 2–1	Clare
J. Kelly (1–1), G. O'Riordan (1–0), C. Ring (0–3), M. O'Riordan (0–2), C. Murphy (0–2), J. Lynch (0–1).		Frost (1–0), Quain (1–0), McDonnell (0–1).

Gaelic Grounds, Limerick

June 16, 1946
Semifinal

Limerick	3–5 – 2–2	Tipperary
J. Mackey (2–1), M. Mackey (0–2), P. FitzGerald (0–1), J. Power (0–1).		Dwyer (1–0), A. Brennan (1–0), Ryan (0–1), J. Coffey (0–1).

Cork Athletic Grounds, Cork

June 30, 1946
Semifinal

Cork	3–9 – 1–6	Waterford
M O'Riordan (1–1), G. O'Riordan (1–1), J. Kelly (1–1), C. Ring (0–4), E. J. O'Sullivan (0–1), J. Lynch (0–1).		Barron (1–0), W. Galvin (0–2), V. Baston (0–2), Feeney (0–2).

Clonmel GAA Ground, Clonmel

July 14, 1946
Final

Cork	3–8 – 1–3	Limerick
C. Ring (0–5), M. O'Riordan (1–1), C. Murphy (1–0), J. Kelly (1–0), J. Young (0–1), J. Lynch (0–1).		McCarthy (1–0), M. Mackey (0–2), J. Ryan (0–1).

Thurles Sportsfield, Thurles
Referee: W. O'Donnell (Tipperary)

=== Ulster Senior Hurling Championship ===
June 16, 1946
Quarterfinal

Fermanagh	–	Monaghan

Enniskillen

July 7, 1946
Semifinal

Armagh	4–4 – 3–6	Donegal

Healy Park, Omagh

July 7, 1946
Semifinal

Antrim	7–15 – 2–8	Monaghan

1946
Final

Antrim	6–3 – 2–1	Armagh

Corrigan Park, Belfast

== All-Ireland Senior Hurling Championship ==
=== Bracket ===
Semifinals
1M	Cork	2–10 (16)
1C	Galway	0–03 (3)
1L	Kilkenny	7–11 (32)
1U	Antrim	0–07 (7)

Final
1M	Cork	7–05 (26)
1L	Kilkenny	3–08 (17)

=== All-Ireland semi-finals ===
July 27, 1946
Semifinal

Cork	2–10 – 0–3	Galway
J. Kelly (2–1), C. Ring (0–4), J. Lynch (0–3), M. O'Riordan (0–1), P. Healy (0–1).		J. Gallagher (0–2), S. Gallagher (0–1).

St. Brendan's Park, Birr

August 4, 1946
Semifinal

Kilkenny	7–11 – 0–7	Antrim
J. Langton (1–5), P. O'Brien (2–1), T. Walton (2–0), L. Reidy (1–2), S. O'Brien (1–1), T. Leahy (0–1), T. Maher (0–1).		J. Mullan (0–5), N. Campbell (0–1), H. Mulholland (0–1).

Croke Park, Dublin
Referee: G. Kelly (Dublin)

=== All-Ireland Final ===
1 September 1946
Final

Cork	7–5 – 3–8	Kilkenny
M. O'Riordan (2–0), C. Murphy (2–0), C. Ring (1–3), G. O'Riordan (1–0), J. Kelly (1–0), B. Murphy (0–1), J. Lynch (0–1).		T. Leahy (2–0), J. Langton (0–5), P. O'Brien (1–0), T. Walton (0–2), S. O'Brien (0–1).

Croke Park, Dublin
Attendance: 64,415
Referee: J. Flaherty (Offaly)

== Sources ==
- Corry, Eoghan, The GAA Book of Lists (Hodder Headline Ireland, 2005).
- Donegan, Des, The Complete Handbook of Gaelic Games (DBA Publications Limited, 2005).
