= 1939 All-Ireland Senior Hurling Championship final =

1939 All-Ireland Senior Hurling Final
- Event: 1939 All-Ireland Senior Hurling Championship
Kilkenny	Cork
2-7	3-3
- Date: 3 September 1939
- Venue: Croke Park, Dublin
- Referee: J. Flaherty (Offaly)
- Attendance: 39,302
- Weather: Thunderstorm

The 1939 All-Ireland Senior Hurling Championship Final, also known as the Thunder and Lightning Final, was the 52nd All-Ireland Final and the culmination of the 1939 All-Ireland Senior Hurling Championship, an inter-county hurling tournament for the top teams in Ireland. The match was held at Croke Park, Dublin, on 3 September 1939, between Kilkenny and Cork. The Munster champions narrowly lost to their Leinster opponents on a score line of 2–7 to 3-3.

It's one of seven All Ireland senior hurling finals to be won with the last score of the game (1904, 1907, 1912, 1939, 1947, 1957 & 1997). Kilkenny won all of those finals except for 1997.

== All-Ireland final ==
=== Overview ===
Sunday, 3 September was the date of the 1939 All-Ireland senior hurling final between Cork and Kilkenny. Cork were appearing in their first championship decider since 1931 when they defeated Kilkenny after a three-game saga to take the title. Kilkenny, however, last won the All-Ireland title in 1935 and last appeared in the final in 1936 when they fell to Limerick. Two days before the final, on 1 September, Nazi Germany invaded Poland, and, when his ultimatum expired, British Prime Minister Neville Chamberlain broadcast Britain's declaration of war on Germany over the radio at 11.15am on 3 September, signaling the start of World War II. His declaration of war came 4 hours before the final began at 3.15pm.

Players and supporters awoke to torrential rain on the morning of the game. It continued to fall until the early afternoon but subsided just before the game started. As Jack Lynch and Jimmy Walsh led their respective teams around Croke Park bright sunshine greeted the men in red and the men in black and amber.

=== Match report ===
At 3:15pm GAA President Paddy McNamee threw in the sliothar the game was on. Even with the benefit of the wind at their backs the Cork men, who were playing at Croke Park for the first time in eight years, began slowly. Within three minutes the Munster champions were 1–1 to 0–0 in arrears as Jimmy Phelan found the net for the first time in the game with an early assault on the Cork goalmouth. Cork captain Jack Lynch opened the scoring for his team, however, ‘the Rebels’ struggled until half-time when they trailed by 2–4 to 1-1.

The game had just restarted when players and spectators alike were startled by a ferocious clap of thunder. What followed was a thunderstorm of extraordinary proportions with thunder and lightning accompanying a heavy downpour. Conditions were so bad that spectators could not make out the identity of some of the players on the field. The spectators sitting in the open had to seek refuge from the elements at several stages throughout the second thirty minutes of play while the press box situated in the front row of the Cusack Stand also had to find alternative accommodation.

On the field of play the hurlers battled with the elements as well as with each other. So bad were the conditions that the dye from the players’ jerseys ran into their togs. The Cork players found their feet and came storming back into the game. Jack Lynch stood up and played a captain's role once again when he scored another goal for Cork. Kilkenny's Paddy Phelan was the star defender of the day as he repelled wave after wave of Cork attacks on goal. As the game neared its conclusion Cork's Willie Campbell lined up to take a long-range free. He sent the sliothar goal-wards, however, it fell through a number of defenders and hurleys and ended in the Kilkenny net. It was speculated that Ted O'Sullivan might have got a touch on the sliothar; however, regardless of this the sides were level with just two minutes left in the game. Most agreed that a draw was now likely and, given the conditions that the game was played in, a draw would have been appropriate. With time running out Jack Lynch missed a number of points before Paddy Phelan sent a 70-yard free in towards the Cork goalmouth. The sliothar was gobbled up by the defence and cleared, but only as far as Jimmy Kelly who sent it straight over the bar for a one-point lead. Many newspapers credited Terry Leahy with scoring the point, however, Kelly was the hero of the day. Immediately after the puck-out the referee blew the whistle and Kilkenny were the champions on a score line of 2–7 to 3-3.

== Match details ==
3 September 1939
15:15 IST

Kilkenny	2-7 – 3-3	Cork

Croke Park, Dublin
Attendance: 39,302
Referee: J. Flaherty (Offaly)

KILKENNY:
GK	1	Jimmy O'Connell
RCB	2	Paddy Grace
FB	3	Paddy Larkin
LCB	4	Peter Blanchfield
RWB	5	Bobby Hinks
CB	6	Billy Burke
LWB	7	Paddy Phelan
M	8	Jimmy Walsh(c)
M	9	Jimmy Kelly
RWF	10	Jim Langton
CF	11	Terry Leahy
LWF	12	Jack Gargan
RCF	13	Jack Mulcahy
FF	14	Seánie O'Brien
LCF	15	Jimmy Phelan
Substitutes:
LWF		Bobby Brannigan

CORK:
GK	1	Jim Buttimer
RCB	2	Alan Lotty
FB	3	Batt Thornhill
LCB	4	Willie ‘Long Puck’ Murphy
RWB	5	Willie Campbell
CB	6	Johnny Quirke
LWB	7	Jim Young
M	8	Jack Lynch(c)
M	9	Jack Barrett
RWF	10	Connie Buckley
CF	11	Bobby Dinneen
LWF	12	Willie Tabb
RCF	13	James 'Bobby' Ryng
FF	14	Ted O'Sullivan
LCF	15	Micka Brennan

MATCH RULES

- 60 minutes.
- Replay if scores level.
- Three named substitutes

== Legacy ==
A sliotar from the game, with the inscription "Jim Langton - All-Ireland 1939", sold at auction in Kilkenny for €750 in March 2021.
