= Willie Murphy (Cork hurler) =

Irish hurler and hurling selector (1913-1977)

Willie "Long Puck" Murphy
Personal information
- Native name: Liam Ó Murchú (Irish)
- Nickname: Long Puck
- Born: 16 December 1913 Ballincollig, County Cork, Ireland
- Died: 24 August 1977 (aged 63) Bishopstown, Cork, Ireland
- Occupation: Dunlop's employee
- Height: 5 ft 9 in (175 cm)

Sport
- Sport: Hurling
- Position: Right corner-back
Clubs
- Years: Club
- Ballincollig; Muskerry
Club titles
- Cork titles: 0
Inter-county
Years	County	Apps (scores)
1939–1949	Cork	37 (0–04)
Inter-county titles
- Munster titles: 6
- All-Irelands: 5
- NHL: 3

William Murphy (16 December 1913 – 24 August 1977), commonly known as Long Puck, was an Irish hurler and hurling selector. His career included All-Ireland Championship victories as a player and later as a selector with the Cork senior hurling team.

After beginning his career at club level with Ballincollig, Murphy joined the Cork minor team in 1930 and began an inter-county career that spanned 20 years. After Munster Championship success with the junior side, he was promoted to the Cork senior team in 1939. From his debut, Murphy was ever-present as a corner-back and made a total of 37 championship appearances in a career that ended with his last game in 1949. During that time he was part of five All-Ireland Championship-winning teams, including Cork's record-breaking four titles in-a-row between 1941 and 1944. Murphy also secured six Munster Championship medals and three National Hurling League medals.

== Playing career ==
=== Ballincollig ===
Murphy first played for the Ballincollig club at juvenile and underage levels in the late 1920s before joining the club's top adult team. He claimed his first major silverware in 1934 when Ballincollig defeated Kinsale by 3-03 to 2-03 to win the Cork Intermediate Championship.

Ballincollig qualified for a second successive intermediate final the following year, with Murphy once again lining out at right corner-back. He ended the game with a second successive winners' medal following the 4-02 to 3-02 victory over St. Columba's.

After three unsuccessful years in the Cork Senior Championship, Ballincollig regarded and qualified for the 1939 intermediate final. Murphy claimed a third winners' medal after captaining the team to a 4-06 to 4-02 victory over Ballinora. In accepting the cup, he was described by County Board registrar Liam O'Shea as being "a worthy representative in the Cork senior hurling team."

Ballincollig's second stint in the senior championship saw Murphy line out in three successive final defeats by Glen Rovers and St. Finbarr's in 1941, 1942 and 1943. He captained the team on a number of occasions, while he also lined out with divisional side Muskerry.

=== Cork ===
==== Minor and junior ====
Murphy first played for Cork as a member of the minor team when he was included as a panellist during the 1930 Munster Championship. He made his first appearance for the team on 24 September 1930 when he was included at left wing-back in Cork's 4-03 to 3-00 defeat by Tipperary in the Munster final. Murphy played with the minor team for a further two years, lining out in goal in the unsuccessful campaigns in 1931 and 1932.

Murphy was in his final year of the minor grade when he was also drafted onto the Cork junior team He won a Munster Championship in his debut season after a 1-04 to 1-02 victory over Clare in the 1932 Munster final. After a one-year absence from the team, Murphy played his last game in the junior grade when Cork suffered a 7-10 to 5-02 defeat by Waterford in the 1934 Munster final.

==== Senior ====
Murphy's performances at club level brought him to the attention of the Cork senior selectors and he was drafted onto the team during the 1938-39 National League. He made his championship debut at left wing-back on 25 June 1939 in a 7-04 to 4-03 defeat of Waterford before later claiming his first Munster Championship medal after a 4-03 to 3-04 victory over Limerick in the final. On 3 September 1939, Murphy lined out at left corner-back when Cork suffered a 2-07 to 3-03 defeat by Kilkenny in the "thunder and Lightning" All-Ireland final.

Murphy claimed his first national silverware when Cork defeated Tipperary by 8-09 to 6-04 to win the 1939-40 National League title. He was selected at right corner-back when Cork surrendered their provincial title to Limerick in the 1940 Munster final.

After winning a second successive National League medal after a 4-11 to 2-07 victory over Dublin in the 1941 league final, Murphy lined out in the second All-Ireland final of his career on 28 September 1941 when he was selected at full-back against Dublin. He ended the game with his first All-Ireland medal after the 5-11 to 0-06 victory. Murphy ended the season by lining out in Cork's 5-04 to 2-05 defeat by Tipperary in the delayed Munster final.

Murphy lined out in a fourth successive Munster final the following year, with Cork claiming the title after a 4-15 to 4-01 defeat of Tipperary. He was again selected at right corner-back for the subsequent All-Ireland final against Dublin and collected his second successive All-Ireland winners' medal after a 2-14 to 3-04 victory.

After winning a third provincial championship medal following a 2-13 to 3-08 victory over Waterford in the 1943 Munster final, Murphy subsequently lined out in a third successive All-Ireland final. He claimed a third successive winners' medal after the 5-16 to 0-04 victory over Antrim.

Murphy claimed a third successive Munster Championship winners' medal - the fourth of his career - after a 4-06 to 3-06 victory over Limerick in the 1944 Munster final replay. On 3 September 1944, he again lined out at right corner-back in a fourth successive All-Ireland final appearance and ended the 2-13 to 1-02 victory over Dublin by becoming one of a select group of players to have won four successive All-Ireland medals.

After failing to secure a fifth successive title in 1945, Murphy won a fifth provincial championship winners' medal after the 3-08 to 1-03 defeat of Limerick in the 1946 Munster final. For the five time in six seasons, he lined out in the subsequent All-Ireland final with Kilkenny providing the opposition. Murphy claimed a fifth All-Ireland winners' medal after again playing at right corner-back in the 7-05 to 3-08 victory.

Murphy claimed a sixth provincial winners' medal after the 2-06 to 2-03 defeat of Limerick in the final. He was again at right corner-back for his seventh All-Ireland final appearance on 7 September 1947, but ended the game on the losing side after the 0-14 to 2-07 defeat by Kilkenny in what is regarded as one of the greatest games of all time.

Murphy won a third National League medal after a 3-03 to 1-02 defeat of Tipperary in the 1948 league final. Later that season he played in the eighth Munster final but ended on the losing side after a 4-07 to 3-09 defeat by Waterford. A defeat by Tipperary in the 1949 Munster Championship brought the curtain down on Murphy's inter-county career.

=== Munster ===
Murphy was first selected for the Munster team in advance of the 1940 Railway Cup. It was the first of nine successive seasons with the inter-provincial team and he ended his debut year with his first winners' medal after a 4-09 to 5-04 defeat of Leinster in the final.

After surrendering the title to Leinster the following year, Murphy claimed five successive titles between 1942 and 1946 as he came to be known as one of the mainstays of the team. He claimed his seventh and final Railway Cup medal as captain of the team in his final game in the 1948 Railway Cup final.

== Coaching career ==
Murphy was added to the selection committee of the Cork senior hurling team in the mid 1960s. His tenure with the team coincided with a return to success after a long period without a title, with Cork claiming the 1966 Munster Championship after a 4-09 to 2-09 victory over Waterford. Murphy later helped to guide the team to a first All-Ireland Championship in 12 years after a five-point defeat of Kilkenny in the final.

== Personal life and death ==
Murphy, who spent much of his working life with Dunlop's, was married to Catherine Murray and lived in the Bishopstown suburb of Cork. They had a son, Eddie, and two daughters, Mary and Audrey. Eddie also enjoyed a lengthy career as a hurler and won an All-Ireland B Championship medal with the Kerry senior hurling team in 1986.

On 24 August 1977, Murphy died suddenly after being taken ill at his home.

== Honours ==
Ballincollig

- Cork Intermediate Hurling Championship (3): 1934, 1935, 1939
- Cork Junior Football Championship (1): 1940

Cork

- All-Ireland Senior Hurling Championship (5): 1941, 1942, 1943, 1944, 1946
- Munster Senior Hurling Championship (6): 1939, 1942, 1943, 1944, 1946, 1947
- National Hurling League (3): 1939–40, 1940–41, 1947–48
- Munster Junior Hurling Championship (1): 1932

Munster

- Railway Cup (7): 1940, 1942, 1943, 1944, 1945, 1946, 1948 (c)

Sporting positions
Preceded by Christy Ring	Munster Hurling Captain; 1948	Succeeded by Jim Ware
Achievements
Preceded by Sean Duggan (Connacht)	Railway Cup Hurling Final winning captain 1948	Succeeded by Jim Ware (Munster)
