= Willie Campbell (hurler) =

Irish hurler (1918–1978)

Personal information
- Native name: Liam Mac Cathmhaoil (Irish)
- Nickname: Billy
- Born: 13 January 1918 Midleton, County Cork, Ireland
- Died: 17 March 1978 (aged 60) Meelin, County Cork, Ireland
- Occupation: Dunlop's employee
- Height: 5 ft 9 in (175 cm)

Sport
- Sport: Hurling
- Position: Right wing-back
Clubs
- Years: Club
- 1936-1940 1941 1942 1943-1944 1945-1946: Midleton; Sarsfield's; Portlaw; St Finbarr's; Midleton
Club titles
- Cork titles: 1
Inter-county
| Years | County | Apps (scores) |
| 1939–1941 1942 1944 | Cork; Waterford; Cork | 10 (1-00); 1 (0-02); 2 (0-00) |
Inter-county titles
- Munster titles: 2
- All-Irelands: 2
- NHL: 2

William Campbell (13 January 1918 – 17 March 1978) was an Irish hurler and selector. At club level he played with Midleton, Sarsfield's, Portlaw and St Finbarr's and was also played at senior level for the Cork and Waterford county hurling teams.

== Club career ==
Born in Midleton, County Cork, Campbell first played hurling at juvenile and underage levels with St Enda's. He was captain of the team that secured the East Cork MHC title in 1936 before being beaten by Glen Rovers for the county honours. By that stage Campbell had also joined the Midleton senior team and was a member of the team when they suffered a defeat by Glen Rovers in the 1938 final.

After five years with Midleton he transferred to the Sarsfields club in 1941. Campbell spent a year with the Portlaw club in Waterford before returning to Cork and joining the St Finbarr's club in 1943. It was a successful move as he was part of "the Barr's" team that won the Cork SHC title after a win 7-09 to 1-01 win over Ballincollig in a final replay. Campbell ended his club career with Midleton in 1946.

== Inter-county career ==
Campbell's performances at juvenile level with St Enda's resulted in him being drafted onto the Cork minor hurling team. He began his three-year association with the team as a non-playing substitute in 1934 before breaking onto the starting fifteen as full-back the following year. Campbell's third and final season with the team saw him line out in a number of positions, including midfield, centre-back and wing-back. His minor career ended with a one-point defeat by Kilkenny in the 1936 All-Ireland minor final.

Campbell's progression to the Cork senior hurling team soon followed. He made a number of appearances throughout the 1938-39 National League and made his championship debut at right wing-back against Waterford in the 1939 Munster SHC semi-final. Campbell was a regular throughout the championship which ended with a defeat by Kilkenny in the 1939 All-Ireland final.

Campbell claimed his first national silverware when Cork secured consecutive National League titles in 1940 and 1941. At the end of the latter season he won his first All-Ireland medal after lining out at right wing-back in the defeat of Dublin in the 1941 All-Ireland final. Campbell was forced to leave the Cork team shortly after but declared for the Waterford senior hurling team and lined out for the team in the 1942 Munster Championship. He returned to the Cork senior team two years later and resumed his position as right wing-back. A knee injury in the 1944 Munster final resulted in him losing his place on the starting fifteen, however, he ended the season with a second All-Ireland medal after being listed amongst the substitutes for the 1944 All-Ireland final defeat of Dublin. It was Campbell's last time lining out for Cork inter championship as the knee injury effectively ended his inter-county career

== Inter-provincial career ==
Campbell's performances at inter-county level resulted in his selection for Munster in their 1940 Railway Cup final defeat of Leinster. He was again included on the team the following year, however, Munster suffered a one-point defeat by Leinster in the final.

== Coaching career ==
Campbell became involved in team management and coaching in retirement from playing. He was a long-serving selector with the Imokilly divisional team, a position he held when Imokilly were beaten by St Finbarr's in the 1968 Cork SHC final. In spite of this defeat, Campbell was elected to a two-year membership of the selection committee of the Cork senior hurling team in September 1968. Success was immediate with Cork securing the National Hurling League title after a defeat of Wexford in the 1969 final. After winning the Munster Championship title after a first defeat of Tipperary in 12 years, Cork were denied a clean sweep of hurling titles following a six-point defeat by Kilkenny in the 1969 All-Ireland final. Campbell's Cork side retained their National League and Munster Championship titles in 1970 before ending the season with a 6-21 to 5-10 defeat of Wexford in the 1970 All-Ireland final. He retained his position as a selector for a third successive season in 1971, however, Cork surrendered their provincial and national titles.

== Personal life and death ==
Campbell married Lilian Kirby at the Roman Catholic Church in Saleen on 31 July 1943. They had one son. Campbell spent over 30 years working at the Dunlop's plant in Cork. He died suddenly on 17 March 1978, aged 60.

== Honours ==
=== Player ===
St Enda's

- East Cork Minor Hurling Championship: 1936 (c)

St Finbarr's

- Cork Senior Hurling Championship: 1943

Cork

- All-Ireland Senior Hurling Championship: 1941, 1944
- Munster Senior Hurling Championship: 1939, 1944
- National Hurling League: 1939–40, 1940–41
- Munster Minor Hurling Championship: 1936

Munster

- Railway Cup: 1940

=== Selector ===
Cork

- All-Ireland Senior Hurling Championship: 1970
- Munster Senior Hurling Championship: 1969, 1970
- National Hurling League: 1968–69, 1969–70
