= James Ryng =

Irish hurler

James Bobby Ryng
Personal information
- Native name: Séamus Ó Rinn (Irish)
- Nickname: Bobby
- Born: 15 February 1913 Ballinacurra, County Cork, Ireland
- Died: 22 August 1988 (Aged 75) Wilton, Cork, Ireland

Sport
- Sport: Hurling
- Position: Left wing-forward
Clubs
- Years: Club
- Midleton; Carrigtwohill; Ballinacurra; Millstreet; Dr. Crokes; Laune Rangers
Inter-county
Years	County	Apps (scores)
1932-1941	Cork	13 (2-3)
Inter-county titles
- Munster titles: 1
- All-Irelands: 1
- NHL: 2

James "Bobby" Ryng (15 February 1913 – 22 August 1988) was an Irish hurler who played for the Cork senior team.

Ryng joined the team during the 1932 championship and was a regular member of the starting fifteen until his retirement after the 1941 championship. During that time he won one All-Ireland medal, one Munster medal and two National League medals. Ryng was an All-Ireland runner-up on one occasion.

At club level Ryng was a four-time county club championship runner-up with Carrigtwohill.

== Playing career ==
=== Club ===
Ryng played his club hurling with Carrigtwohill during a time when the club made great strides but fell short of claiming ultimate championship honours.

In 1932 Carrig qualified for the first senior championship decider in eighteen years and Ryng was in the full-forward line. St. Finbarr's led by fourteen points at one stage, however, Carrig fought back in the second half. Ryng still ended up on the losing side by 5-3 to 4-4.

Both sides met in the decider again the following year. Carrigtwohill nearly pulled off a coup, however, the game ended in a draw. St. Finbarr's made no mistake in the replay and Ryng ended up on the losing side by 6-6 to 5-0.

In 1935 Ryng was moved from the forwards to defence as Carrig qualified for another county final. After picking up a number of injuries in the semi-final as well as having Ryng suspended, Carrigtwohill sought a postponement of the game. Glen Rovers were agreeable to a two-week, however, the county board opposed any such move. As a result of this Carrigtwohill gave the Glen a walkover. Glen Rovers "eight in a row" includes this 1935 unplayed final which in effect was won in Cook Street, where the Cork County Board meetings were then held. However, six in a row is not bad!!!! Two years later Ryng played in a third championship decider with Glen Rovers providing the opposition. The game was an anti-climax as Carrig were defeated once again by 3-5 to 1-0.

=== Inter-county ===
Ryng first came to prominence on the inter-county scene as a member of Cork's first minor hurling team in 1928. Cork claimed both the inaugural Munster Minor Hurling Championship and All-Ireland Minor Hurling Championship titles that year. He was only fifteen years of age and he is still the youngest player ever to win an All-Ireland Minor medal. He went on to play for the unsuccessful Cork minors for the following three years. He won Munster College provincial medals in 1929 and 1930.

In 1932 Ryng made his senior championship debut in a Munster quarter-final defeat of Waterford. He was promoted from the Cork Junior team of that year and at nineteen years of age was the youngest player on the senior side. He was a regular with Cork for the next nine years. However, Waterford and Limerick ruled the roost for most of that period.

By 1939 Ryng was one of the more senior members of the team as Cork made a breakthrough in the provincial championship. A narrow 4-3 to 3-4 defeat of Limerick gave Cork the title and gave Ryng his first Munster medal. The subsequent All-Ireland final pitted Cork against Kilkenny. In one of the most iconic championship deciders of all-time, played on the day that World War II broke out, the climax of which was played in a ferocious thunder storm. Ryng roomed with Jack Lynch, a future Taoiseach, and in the early hours of Sunday they were woken with a terrible racket and they thought Dublin was being bombed. It was thunder and lightning. While a draw looked likely as the hour drew to a close Paddy Phelan sent a seventy-yard free in towards the Cork goalmouth. The sliotar was gobbled up by the defence and cleared, but only as far as Jimmy Kelly who sent it straight over the bar for a one-point lead. Immediately after the puck-out the referee blew the whistle and Cork were defeated on a score line of 2-7 to 3-3. Kilkenny have won seven All-Irelands' by a point, beating Cork in five. Cork only once beat Kilkenny in an All-Ireland Final by a point and that was in 1999.

Although defeated in the All-Ireland decider, Cork continued their breakthrough in 1940. An 8-9 to 6-4 defeat of Tipperary in the decider gave Ryng his first National Hurling League medal. He added a second winners' medal to his collection in 1941 following a defeat of Dublin.

An outbreak of foot and mouth disease severely hampered the 1941 championship. As a result of this Cork were nominated to represent the province in the All-Ireland series. Ryng was listed as a substitute for the final and came on against Dublin, however, it turned into a one-sided affair thanks to contributing goals from Johnny Quirke and Ted O'Sullivan. At the full-time whistle Cork had won by 5-11 to 0-6. It was one of the most one-sided championship deciders of all-time, however, it did give Ryng an All-Ireland medal. Bobby retired from inter-county hurling after this victory. Even though the 1941 programme shows his club as Carrigtwohill, he had transferred to his native Ballinacurra in 1940. In 1942 he captained Ballinacurra in their victory over Midleton to win the East Cork Junior Championship. Transport was scarce during the war years, scarce anyway, so the Ballinacurra team assembled at Midleton, where the Park Hotel now stands, how provocative!, and walked to the match at Cloyne. There were no hamstrings back then! He also played with Dr. Crokes, Killarney and Laune Rangers, Killorglin as his carpentry work with the railway brought him to these locations. Indeed, the history book, entitled "The Trail Blazers", which Laune Rangers launched in their 1988 centenary year includes a piece; "When Ring hurled with the Rangers". This was taken from a Puck Fair supplement of the Kerryman Newspaper but the accompanying photo shoes the "REAL RYNG" - BOBBY! He was also a noted footballer and played senior with Midleton and also, again because of his work, with Millstreet. In 1938 he was on the Millstreet team that lost to St. Nicks in the Cork County Senior Football Championship semi-final.

== Honours ==
=== Team ===
Cork

- All-Ireland Senior Hurling Championship (1): 1941
- Munster Senior Hurling Championship (1): 1939
- National Hurling League (2): 1939-40, 1940-41
