= 1940 All-Ireland Senior Hurling Championship final =

1940 All-Ireland Senior Hurling Final
- Event: 1940 All-Ireland Senior Hurling Championship
Limerick	Kilkenny
3-7	1-7
- Date: 1 September 1940
- Venue: Croke Park, Dublin
- Referee: John Joe Callinan (Tipperary)
- Attendance: 49,260

The 1940 All-Ireland Senior Hurling Championship Final was a hurling match played at Croke Park on 1 September 1940 to determine the winners of the 1940 All-Ireland Senior Hurling Championship, a tournament organised by the Gaelic Athletic Association for the champions of the three hurling provinces of Ireland. It was the 53rd All-Ireland final. The match was contested by Kilkenny of Leinster and Limerick of Munster, with Limerick winning by 3–7 to 1–7.

The All-Ireland final between Limerick and Kilkenny was the fifth championship meeting between the two teams. Kilkenny, the reigning champions, were appearing in their eighth final in ten years and were hoping to win their 13th title. Limerick were lining out in their fifth final in eight years and were hoping to claim a 6th championship title.

Limerick's All-Ireland victory was their first since 1936. The win put them in joint fourth position, alongside Dublin on the all-time roll of honour.

Kilkenny's All-Ireland defeat was their tenth in a final. It was the first of three defeats in All-Ireland final before their next victory.

== Match ==
=== Details ===
1 September 1940
15:15 UTC+1

Limerick	3-7 – 1-7	Kilkenny

Croke Park, Dublin
Attendance: 49,260
Referee: J.J. Callinan (Tipperary)

Limerick	Kilkenny

== Order of Scoring ==
1940 All Ireland Senior Hurling Final Scoring Order
Half	Min	Winner	Score	Runner up	Score	SD	Scorer	Note
1	5	Limerick	0-00	Kilkenny	1-00	-3	Terry Leahy
1	6	Limerick	0-00	Kilkenny	1-01	-4	Terry Leahy	f
1	15	Limerick	0-01	Kilkenny	1-01	-3	Paddy Clohessy	65
1	24	Limerick	0-02	Kilkenny	1-01	-2	Jackie Power
1	25	Limerick	1-02	Kilkenny	1-01	+1	Jackie Power
1	27	Limerick	1-02	Kilkenny	1-02	0	Terry Leahy	f
1	29	Limerick	1-02	Kilkenny	1-03	-1	Jimmy Phelan
1	30	Limerick	1-02	Kilkenny	1-04	-2	Jim Langton	f
Half	Min	Winner	Score	Runner up	Score	SD	Scorer	Note
2	1	Limerick	1-02	Kilkenny	1-05	-3	Jack Mulcahy
2	3	Limerick	1-02	Kilkenny	1-06	-4	Jimmy Walsh
2	5	Limerick	1-03	Kilkenny	1-06	-3	Timmy Ryan
2	7	Limerick	1-04	Kilkenny	1-06	-2	Mick Mackey
2	10	Limerick	2-04	Kilkenny	1-06	+1	Dick Stokes0
2	15	Limerick	3-04	Kilkenny	1-06	+4	John Mackey
2	16	Limerick	3-05	Kilkenny	1-06	+5	Jackie Power
2	25	Limerick	3-06	Kilkenny	1-06	+6	Timmy Ryan
2	27	Limerick	3-06	Kilkenny	1-07	+5	Seánie O'Brien
2	29	Limerick	3-07	Kilkenny	1-07	+6	Mick Mackey	f

== Miscellaneous ==
- Kilkenny led by four points at one stage in the game. It was the biggest lead by a losing side since 1922 (Tipperary, 4pts).
- Kilkenny opened the scoring with a goal. Only the third final ever at that stage where the losing team opened with a goal (1906 & 1915). Cork would also do it in 1969.
