= Paddy Grace =

Irish hurler (1917–1984)

Personal information
- Native name: Pádraig de Grás (Irish)
- Born: 3 August 1917 Palmerstown, County Kilkenny, Ireland
- Died: 21 July 1984 (aged 66) Kilkenny, Ireland
- Occupation: Insurance agent
- Height: 5 ft 9 in (175 cm)

Sport
- Sport: Hurling
- Position: Left corner-back
Clubs
- Years: Club
- Éire Óg; Carrickshock; Dicksboro
Club titles
	Football	Hurling
Kilkenny titles	1	5
Inter-county
- Years: County
- 1938-1950: Kilkenny
Inter-county titles
- Leinster titles: 6
- All-Irelands: 2
- NHL: 0

Patrick Grace (3 August 1917 – 21 July 1984) was an Irish hurler who played as a left corner-back for the Kilkenny senior team.

Born in Palmerstown, County Kilkenny, Grace first played competitive hurling during his schooling at CBS Kilkenny. He arrived on the inter-county scene at the age of fifteen when he first linked up with the Kilkenny minor team. He joined the senior panel during the 1937-38 league. Grace immediately became a regular member of the starting fifteen, and won two All-Ireland medals and six Leinster medals. He was an All-Ireland runner-up on three occasions.

As a member of the Leinster inter-provincial team on a number of occasions, Grace won one Railway Cup medals. At club level he won five championship medals having played with Éire Óg, Carrickshock and Dicksboro.

His grandsons, Tommy and Pádraig Walsh, have also enjoyed All-Ireland success with Kilkenny. His granddaughter, Grace, is a key member of the Kilkenny senior camogie team.

Grace retired from inter-county hurling before the start of the 1950 championship.

In retirement from playing Grace became heavily involved in the administrative affairs of the Gaelic Athletic Association. His tenure as secretary of the Kilkenny County Board spanned five decades.

== Playing career ==
=== Club ===
Grace began his club hurling career at underage levels with Éire Óg. He won three minor championship medals with the club during a four-year spell between 1932 and 1935.

In 1936 Grace was just out of the minor grade when he joined the Éire Óg junior team. He won a championship medal in that grade that year following a 6-2 to 4-0 defeat of Moonrue.

Both sides resumed their rivalry in the intermediate decider the following year. A huge 8-4 to 1-2 victory gave Grace a championship medal in that grade.

By 1940 Grace had joined Carrickshock as the team were about to contest a third successive decider. A narrow 1-4 to 1-2 defeat of Mullinavat gave Grace a first championship medal in the senior grade.

Old rivals and Grace's former club Éire Óg provided the opposition in the 1941 county final, however, Carrickshock finally retained the title following a one-point 4-5 to 3-7 victory. It was Grace's second championship medal.

Carrickshock's great run of success continued in 1942 as the club qualified for a fifth successive final. Threecastles, who were appearing in their first decider in thirty-five years, were the opponents, however, a 3-2 to 2-3 victory gave Grace his third championship medal.

In 1943 Carrickshock set a remarkable record in Kilkenny hurling by winning a fourth successive championship. The 3-6 to 1-3 defeat of Mullinavat gave Grace a fourth championship medal.

Grace added a county football championship medal to his collection in 1948 as St. Paul's defeated Conahy Sarsfields by 1-7 to 0-4 in a replay.

By 1950 Grace was playing with Dicksboro. He won a fifth hurling championship medal that year following a 4-6 to 1-5 defeat of Éire Óg in a replay.

=== Inter-county ===
In 1935 Grace was appointed captain of the Kilkenny minor team. He won a Leinster medal following a 7-9 to 1-1 trouncing of Laois. The subsequent All-Ireland decider on 1 September 1935 pitted Kilkenny against Tipperary. A narrow 4-2 to 3-3 victory gave Grace an All-Ireland Minor Hurling Championship medal.

Grace made his senior debut in a 1-3 to 5-4 National Hurling League group stage defeat by Limerick on 3 April 1938.

In 1939 Grace won his first Leinster medal following a 2-12 to 4-3 defeat of reigning All-Ireland champions Dublin. The subsequent All-Ireland final with Cork on 3 September 1939 is regarded as one of the most famous championship deciders of all-time. The game was an exciting one with an explosive finish, as a spectacular thunderstorm lit up proceedings. Willie Campbell landed a long-range free in the net for an equalizing goal for Cork and a draw looked likely. Terry Leahy doubled on a Paddy Phelan 70-yard free to secure the winning point for Kilkenny on the stroke of full-time. The 2-7 to 3-3 score line gave Kilkenny the victory and gave Grace a first All-Ireland medal.

Grace won a second Leinster medal in 1940 following a 3-6 to 2-5 defeat of Dublin. The All-Ireland decider on 1 September 1940 brought Kilkenny and Limerick together for the last great game between the two outstanding teams of the decade. Early in the second-half Kilkenny took a four-point lead, however, once captain Mick Mackey was deployed at midfield he proceeded to dominate the game. Limerick hung on to win the game on a score line of 3-7 to 1-7.

In 1943 Grace collected his third Leinster medal following a 3-9 to 2-6 defeat of Dublin. Kilkenny were later defeated by Antrim in the All-Ireland semi-final in one of the greatest hurling shocks of all-time.

After surrendering their title the following year, Grace collected a fourth Leinster medal in 1945 following a 5-12 to 3-4 defeat of Dublin. On 2 September 1945 Kilkenny faced near neighbours and fierce rivals Tipperary in the All-Ireland decider. Tipp raced into a stunning lead and left Kilkenny trailing by 4-3 to 0-3 at half-time. Three goals by "the Cats" in the second period turned the tide, however, it wasn’t enough as Tipperary won by 5-6 to 3-6.

Kilkenny and Dublin renewed their provincial dominance once again in the 1946 decider. In a much closer game Kilkenny won by 3-8 to 1-12, giving Grace a fifth Leinster medal. The subsequent All-Ireland final on 1 September 1946 pitted Kilkenny against old rivals Cork for the first time since 1939. Two quick goals just before half-time, one from the stick of Christy Ring, put Cork in the driving seat. Five more goals followed in the second period as Cork were the 7-5 to 3-8 winners.

Grace collected a sixth and final Leinster medal in 1947 following a 7-10 to 3-6 defeat of Dublin once again. On 7 September 1947 Kilkenny faced Cork in a repeat of the previous year's decider. The game itself is often described as the greatest All-Ireland final of them all. Jim Langton and Terry Leahy spearheaded the Kilkenny attack, while Mossy O'Riordan and Joe Kelly scored goals for Cork that nearly won the game. In the end Kilkenny won by 0-14 to 2-7, thus avoiding the ignominy of becoming the first team to lose three-in-a-row. It was Grace's second All-Ireland medal.

=== Inter-provincial ===
Grace was a regular on the Leinster inter-provincial team for almost a decade, however, it was a largely unsuccessful period for the eastern province. He won his sole Railway Cup medal in 1941 as Leinster narrowly defeated archrivals Munster by 2-5 to 2-4.

== Administrative career ==
Grace's dissatisfaction regarding player welfare saw him challenge for the position of county board secretary in late 1947. After being elected to the position he served until his death in 1984.

== Honours ==
=== Team ===
CBS Kilkenny

- Leinster Colleges Junior Hurling Championship (1): 1934

Éire Óg

- Kilkenny Intermediate Hurling Championship (1): 1937
- Kilkenny Junior Hurling Championship (1): 1936
- Kilkenny Junior Football Championship (1): 1937
- Kilkenny Minor Hurling Championship (3): 1932, 1934, 1935

Carrickshock

- Kilkenny Senior Hurling Championship (4): 1940, 1941, 1942, 1943

St. Paul's

- Kilkenny Senior Football Championship (1): 1948

Kilkenny

- All-Ireland Senior Hurling Championship (2): 1939, 1947
- Leinster Senior Hurling Championship (6): 1939, 1940, 1943, 1945, 1946, 1947
- All-Ireland Minor Hurling Championship (1): 1935 (c)
- Leinster Minor Hurling Championship (1): 1935 (c)

Leinster

- Railway Cup (1): 1941

Sporting positions
Preceded by Joe Young	Secretary of the Kilkenny County Board; 1947-1984	Succeeded by Ted Carroll
