= Bill Tabb (hurler) =

Irish hurler

Personal information
- Native name: Liam Tabb (Irish)
- Born: 30 May 1918 Cobh, County Cork, Ireland
- Died: 15 January 1997 (aged 78) Wilton, Cork, Ireland
- Occupation: Gas fitter

Sport
- Sport: Hurling
- Position: Left wing-forward
Clubs
- Years: Club
- Midleton; Carrigtwohill
Club titles
- Cork titles: 0
Inter-county
Years	County	Apps (scores)
1938-1940	Cork	2 (0-00)
Inter-county titles
- Munster titles: 1
- All-Irelands: 0
- NHL: 1

William Tabb (30 May 1918 – 15 January 1997) was an Irish hurler. At club level he played with Midleton, Carrigtwohill and Cobh and was also a member of the Cork senior hurling team.

== Career ==
Tabb first played hurling with the Midleton club before later transferring to Carrigtwohill. He ended his career without a county championship title. Tabb's performances at club level earned a call-up to the Cork senior hurling team. He made a number of appearances throughout the 1938-39 National League and made his championship debut as a substitute against Limerick in the 1939 Munster final. Such was Tabb's influence in that game that he earned selection on the starting fifteen for the 1939 All-Ireland final defeat by Kilkenny. He was part of Cork's 1939-40 National Hurling League-winning team before leaving the panel.

== Personal life and death ==
Tabb later worked as a gas fitter in the Verolme Cork Dockyard. He was an accomplished rower and served as president of Rushbrooke Rowing Club. Tabb died at the Regional Hospital in Cork on 15 January 1997, aged 78.

== Honours ==
Cork

- Munster Senior Hurling Championship: 1939
- National Hurling League: 1939-40
