= Seánie O'Brien =

Irish hurler (1919–1988)

Personal information
- Native name: Seánie Ó Briain (Irish)
- Born: 23 August 1919 Kilkenny, Ireland
- Died: 19 December 1988 (aged 69) Kilkenny, Ireland
- Occupation: Stonemason
- Height: 5 ft 6 in (168 cm)

Sport
- Sport: Hurling
- Position: Full-forward
Clubs
- Years: Club
- Éire Óg; Dicksboro
Club titles
- Kilkenny titles: 0
Inter-county
- Years: County
- 1939-1946: Kilkenny
Inter-county titles
- Leinster titles: 5
- All-Irelands: 1
- NHL: 0

John O'Brien (23 August 1919 – 19 December 1988), known as Seánie O'Brien, was an Irish hurler who played for club sides Éire Óg and Dicksboro and at inter-county level with the Kilkenny senior hurling team. He usually lined out as a full-forward.

== Career ==
O'Brien played hurling as a schoolboy with the Kilkenny CBS team that won the Leinster Junior Championship in 1934. At club level, he won four consecutive Kilkenny MAHC titles with the Éire Óg club. O'Brien progressed onto the club's senior team and won his sole Kilkenny SHC title after a defeat of Carrickshock in 1939. He later had a lengthy senior career with the Dicksboro club. O'Brien first appeared on the inter-county scene during a three-year tenure with the Kilkenny minor hurling team. He won All-Ireland MHC medals in 1935 and 1936 and was team captain in 1937. O'Brien subsequently earned a call-up to the Kilkenny senior hurling team and played at full-forward in the defeat of Cork in the 1939 All-Ireland final. He also won five leinster Championship medals and lined out in the All-Ireland finals of 1940, 1945 and 1946. O'Brien also won a Railway Cup medal with Leinster in 1941.

== Personal life and death ==
Born in the Bishop's Hill area of Kilkenny, O'Brien was the son of James and Margaret O'Brien. After leaving school he trained as a stonemason with Cleere's Builders and he worked in Germany, the Netherlands and the United States. His sons, Seánie and Paddy O'Brien, played hurling with the James Stephens club and won All-Ireland MHC honours with Kilkenny in 1972.

O'Brien died at St Luke's Hospital in Kilkenny on 19 December 1988, aged 69.

== Honours ==
Éire Óg

- Kilkenny Senior Hurling Championship: 1939
- Kilkenny Minor Hurling Championship: 1934, 1935, 1936, 1937

Kilkenny

- All-Ireland Senior Hurling Championship: 1939
- Leinster Senior Hurling Championship: 1939, 1940, 1943, 1945, 1946
- All-Ireland Minor Hurling Championship: 1935, 1936
- Leinster Minor Hurling Championship: 1935, 1936, 1937 (c)

Leinster

- Railway Cup: 1941

Sporting positions
Preceded by Éamonn Tallent	Kilkenny minor hurling team captain 1937	Succeeded by
