= 1941 All-Ireland Senior Hurling Championship =

Championship details
- Dates: 18 May – 28 October 1941
- Teams: 12

All-Ireland champions
- Winning team: Cork (12th win)
- Captain: Connie Buckley

All-Ireland Finalists
- Losing team: Dublin
- Captain: Ned Wade

Provincial champions
- Munster: Tipperary
- Leinster: Dublin
- Ulster: Not Played
- Connacht: Not Played

Championship statistics
- No. matches played: 11
- Goals total: 82 (7.45 per game)
- Points total: 126 (11.45 per game)
- Top Scorer: Jack Lynch (3–9)
- All-Star Team: See here

The 1941 All-Ireland Senior Hurling Championship was the 55th staging of the All-Ireland Senior Hurling Championship, the Gaelic Athletic Association's premier inter-county hurling tournament. The championship ended on 28 September 1941.

Limerick were the defending champions, however, they were defeated by Cork in the provincial series.

The championship was won by Cork who secured the title following a 5–11 to 0–6 defeat of Dublin in the All-Ireland final. This was their 12th All-Ireland title, their first in ten championship seasons.

== Foot-and-mouth disease ==
There was major disruption to the format of the 1941 championship due to a serious outbreak of foot-and-mouth disease in many parts of Munster and south Leinster. The championship was run on a knockout provincial basis as usual, however, there was a certain amount of tweaking required to cope with the situation.

In the Munster championship Limerick defeated Waterford in the semi-final of the competition and qualified for the Munster final. Cork were drawn to meet Tipperary in the second semi-final, however, this game was cancelled by the Munster Council at the behest of the Department of Agriculture. As a result of this it was decided that Cork would play Limerick and the winners would represent Munster in the All-Ireland series. The delayed Cork-Tipperary game took place after the All-Ireland series, however, since Cork had already beaten Limerick this was now deemed to be the Munster decider. Tipperary won that game.

It was a similar story in the Leinster championship as foot-and-mouth disease ravaged southern parts of the province. Kilkenny were drawn to play Laois in one of the earlier stages of the provincial competition, however, the match could not take place and Kilkenny were given a bye into the Leinster final. The Department of Agriculture subsequently brought out an order that Kilkenny could not play in the Leinster final until the county was three weeks clear of the disease. The result was that Dublin were nominated to represent Leinster in the All-Ireland series. A delayed Leinster final was played after the completion of the All-Ireland final with Dublin defeating Kilkenny.

== Teams ==
=== Overview ===
Six teams contested the Leinster championship while five teams contested the Munster championship. Galway, who faced no competition in their own province, entered the championship at the All-Ireland semi-final stage. No team from Ulster participated in the senior championship.

=== Team summaries ===
| Team | Colours | Most recent success | | |
| Team | Colours | All-Ireland | Provincial | League |
|---|---|---|---|---|
| Clare | Saffron and blue | 1914 | 1932 | |
| Cork | Red and white | 1931 | 1931 | 1940–41 |
| Dublin | Navy and blue | 1938 | 1938 | 1938–39 |
| Galway | Maroon and white | 1923 | 1922 | 1930–31 |
| Kilkenny | Black and amber | 1939 | 1940 | 1932–33 |
| Laois | Blue and white | 1915 | 1915 | |
| Limerick | Green and white | 1940 | 1940 | 1937–38 |
| Offaly | Green, white and gold | | | |
| Tipperary | Blue and gold | 1937 | 1937 | 1927–28 |
| Waterford | Blue and white | | 1938 | |
| Westmeath | Maroon and white | | | |
| Wexford | Purple and gold | 1910 | 1918 | |

== Provincial championships ==
=== Leinster Senior Hurling Championship ===
| 18 May 1941 First round | Westmeath | 2–2 – 8–4 | Offaly | Cusack Park |

| 25 May 1941 Quarter-final | Wexford | 3–2 – 5–6 | Laois | Enniscorthy Sportsfield |

| 15 June 1941 Quarter-final | Offaly | 2–4 – 5–11 | Dublin | O'Connor Park |

| 20 July 1941 Semi-final | Laois | 5–7 – 6–11 | Dublin | O'Moore Park |

| 2 November 1941 Final | Dublin | 2–8 – 1–8 | Kilkenny | Croke Park |
| | M McDonnell 2–3, T Leahy 0–3, H Gray 0–2. | | J Langton 0–5, S O'Brien 1–0, J Walsh 0–2, J O'Neill 0–1. |

=== Munster Senior Hurling Championship ===
First round

| 1 June 1941 First round | Tipperary | Postponed | Waterford | Thurles Sportsfield, Thurles |

| 27 July 1941 First round refixture | Tipperary | 4–07 – 3–04 | Waterford | Thurles Sportsfield, Thurles |
| | B O'Donnell 1–3, P Ryan 1–0, T Kennedy 1–0, J Heaney 1–0, D Doorly 0–2, N Condon 0–1, M Ryan 0–1. | | W Barron 1–1, N Daly 1–0, S Feeney 1–0, M Hickey 0–2, D Power 0–1. |

Semi-finals

| 22 June 1941 Semi-final | Clare | 1–05 – 8–03 | Limerick | Cusack Park, Ennis |
| | Flynn 1–0, Halloran 0–2, Flanagan 0–1, McNamara 0–1, Mullane 0–1. | | D Stokes 3–1, P McMahon 3–0, Power 1–1, J Roche 1–0, M Butler 0–1. |

| 17 August 1941 Semi-final | Cork | Cancelled | Tipperary | Gaelic Grounds, Limerick |

Finals

| 14 September 1941 Final | Cork | 8–10 – 3–02 | Limerick | Cork Athletic Grounds, Cork |
| | J Lynch 2–5, J Quirke 2–1, T O'Sullivan 2–1, M Brennan 1–0, J Young 1–0, C Ring 0–2, C Buckley 0–1. | | D Stokes 2–0, P McMahon 1–0, M Butler 0–1, T Ryan 0–1. |

| 26 October 1941 Final refixture | Tipperary | 5–04 – 2–05 | Cork | Gaelic Grounds, Limerick |
| | B O'Donnell 2–3, T Treacy 1–1, J Heaney 1–0, J Looby 1–0. | | J Lynch 1–4, J Ryng 1–0, J Young 0–1. |

== All-Ireland Senior Hurling Championship ==
| 14 September 1941 Semi-final | Dublin | 2–4 – 2–2 | Galway | St. Cronan's Park |

| 28 September 1941 Final | Cork | 5–11 – 0–6 | Dublin | Croke Park |
| | | | | Attendance: 26,150; Referee: W O'Donnell (Tipperary) |

== Championship statistics ==
=== Scoring ===
- Widest winning margin: 23 points
  - Cork 8–10 : 5–2 Limerick (Munster final, 14 September 1941)
- Most goals in a match: 11
  - Cork 8–10 : 5–2 Limerick (Munster final, 14 September 1941)
  - Laois 5–7 : 6–11 Dublin (Leinster semi-final, 20 July 1941)
- Most points in a match: 18
  - Laois 5–7 : 6–11 Dublin (Leinster semi-final, 20 July 1941)
- Most goals by one team in a match: 8
  - Cork 8–10 : 5–2 Limerick (Munster final, 14 September 1941)
  - Offaly 8–4 : 2–2 Westmeath (Leinster first round, 18 May 1941)
- Most goals scored by a losing team: 5
  - Laois 5–7 : 6–11 Dublin (Leinster semi-final, 20 July 1941)
- Most points scored by a losing team: 8
  - Kilkenny 1–8 : 2–8 Dublin (Leinster final, 2 November 1941)

=== Miscellaneous ===
- Cork win their 12th All-Ireland title to draw level with Kilkenny and Tipperary at the top of the all-time roll of honour. It is the second time that "the big three" share the title of roll of honour leaders.
- Cork's defeat by Tipperary in the delayed Munster final left the team with the unusual distinction of being the first All-Ireland champions and provincial runners-up.

== Player facts ==
=== Debutants ===
The following players made their début in the 1941 senior championship:

| Player | Team | Date | Opposition | Game |
|---|---|---|---|---|
| Con Cottrell | Cork | September 14 | Limerick | Munster final |

=== Retirees ===
The following players played their last game in the 1941 championship:

| Player | Team | Last Game | Date | Opposition | Début |
|---|---|---|---|---|---|
| Jack Barrett | Cork | Delayed Munster final | October 26 | Tipperary | 1934 |
| Connie Buckley | Cork | Delayed Munster final | October 26 | Tipperary | 1934 |
| James Ryng | Cork | Delayed Munster final | October 26 | Tipperary | 1932 |

== Sources ==
- Corry, Eoghan, The GAA Book of Lists (Hodder Headline Ireland, 2005).
- Donegan, Des, The Complete Handbook of Gaelic Games (DBA Publications Limited, 2005).
- Horgan, Tim, Christy Ring: Hurling's Greatest (The Collins Press, 2007).
- Nolan, Pat, Flashbacks: A Half Century of Cork Hurling (The Collins Press, 2000).
- Sweeney, Éamonn, Munster HUrling Legends (The O'Brien Press, 2002).
