= Jimmy O'Connell (hurler) =

Irish hurler

Personal information
- Native name: Séamus Ó Conaill (Irish)
- Born: 1908 Kilkenny, Ireland
- Occupation: Publican

Sport
- Sport: Hurling
- Position: Goalkeeper
Club
- Years: Club
- 1933-1945: Dicksboro
Club titles
- Kilkenny titles: 0
Inter-county
- Years: County
- 1932-1941: Kilkenny
Inter-county titles
- Leinster titles: 4
- All-Irelands: 3
- NHL: 0

James O'Connell (1908 - 20 January 1969) was an Irish hurler who played as a goalkeeper for the Kilkenny senior team from 1932 until 1941.

Born in Kilkenny, O'Connell first played competitive hurling during his schooling at Terenure College. He arrived on the inter-county scene at the age of twenty-four when he first linked up with the Kilkenny senior team. After a year as a substitute he made his debut in the 1932 championship. During his career O'Connell won three All-Ireland medals and five Leinster medals. He was an All-Ireland runner-up on two occasions.

O'Connell also represented the Leinster inter-provincial team at various times, winning two Railway Cup medals. At club level he enjoyed a lengthy career with Dicksboro.

He died in January 1969 and the Kilkenny People reported that he was living on Mount Street, Dublin at the time. He is buried in Deansgrange Cemetery, along with his wife, Kathleen, who he married in 1939 in Terenure.

== Honours ==
=== Team ===
Kilkenny

- All-Ireland Senior Hurling Championship (4): 1932 (sub), 1933, 1935, 1939
- Leinster Senior Hurling Championship (6): 1932 (sub), 1933 (sub), 1935, 1936, 1939, 1940

Leinster

- Railway Cup (2): 1936, 1941
