= Jim Langton =

Irish hurler (1918–1987)

Personal information
- Native name: Séamus Langtún (Irish)
- Born: 18 January 1918 Gowran, County Kilkenny, Ireland
- Died: 18 April 1987 (aged 69) Kilkenny, Ireland
- Occupation: Farmer

Sport
- Sport: Hurling
- Position: Left wing-forward
Club
- Years: Club
- Éire Óg
Club titles
- Kilkenny titles: 4
Inter-county
Years	County	Apps (scores)
1938–1954	Kilkenny	43 (15–146)
Inter-county titles
- Leinster titles: 7
- All-Irelands: 2
- NHL: 0
- All Stars: 1

James Langton (18 January 1918 – 18 April 1987) was an Irish hurler who usually played as a left wing-forward for the Kilkenny senior team.

Born in Gowran, County Kilkenny, Phelan first played competitive hurling whilst at school in Kilkenny CBS. He arrived on the inter-county scene at the age of seventeen when he first linked up with the Kilkenny minor team. He made his senior debut in the 1938 championship. Langton went on to play a key part for Kilkenny during a lean era for the county, and won two All-Ireland medals and seven Leinster medals. He was an All-Ireland runner-up on three occasions.

As a member of the Leinster inter-provincial team for fourteen years, Langton won two Railway Cup medals. At club level he won four championship medal with Éire Óg.

Langton's career tally of 15 goals and 146 points was a record score for a Kilkenny player which stood for twenty years when it was surpassed by Eddie Keher.

Throughout his career, Langton made 43 championship appearances. His retirement came following Kilkenny's defeat by Wexford in the 1954 championship.

Langton has been repeatedly voted onto teams made up of the sport's greats, including at left wing-forward on the Hurling Team of the Century in 1984 and the Hurling Team of the Millennium in 2000.

== Playing career ==
=== College ===
Langton first came to hurling prominence with the Kilkenny CBS in the inter-colleges series of games.

In 1936 he was a key member of the college team that made history by reaching their first provincial final. A comprehensive 3–4 to 1–1 defeat of Blackrock College gave Langton a Leinster medal.

=== Club ===
Langton played his club hurling with Éire Óg and enjoyed much success in a career that spanned three decades.

His arrival on the inter-county scene marked an upturn in the fortunes of the club. After losing the county decider to Carrickshock in 1938, both sides faced off at the same stage of the championship the following year. A narrow 3–7 to 3–5 victory gave Langton his first championship medal.

Éire Óg failed to retain their championship crown in 1940, while Carrickshock defeated the team in the county showpiece in 1942.

Langton lined out in his fourth championship decider in 1944, with old rivals and five-in-a-row hopefuls Carrickshock providing the opposition once again. A 7–9 to 4–4 trouncing gave Langton a second championship medal.

Éire Óg reached the final again in 1945 and were presented with the chance of making their own piece of history by retaining the title. Once again Carrickshock stood in the way, however, a 2–7 to 1–10 draw was the result. The subsequent replay was more conclusive, with Langton collecting a third championship medal following a 4–8 to 1–7 victory.

Three-in-a-row proved beyond Éire Óg, however, the club reached the final again in 1947. Tullaroan were the opponents, however, a 3–10 to 0–13 victory gave Langton a fourth and final championship medal.

Langton's swansong for the club was in 1950 when Éire Óg were defeated by Dicksboro in a replay of the championship decider.

=== Minor ===
Langton first played for Kilkenny as a member of the county's minor team in 1935. It was a successful year as "the Cats" reached the final of the provincial series. Laois provided the opposition on that occasion, however, they proved no match for Kilkenny. A 7–8 to 1–1 trouncing gave Langton a first Leinster medal. The subsequent All-Ireland decider pitted Kilkenny against Tipperary. A close game developed, however, at the full-time whistle Kilkenny were the champions on a 4–2 to 3–3 score line. It was Langton's first All-Ireland medal.

Kilkenny dominated the provincial minor championship again in 1936. A 3–13 to 1–1 defeat of Dublin gave Langton a second Leinster medal. He later lined out in a second successive All-Ireland decider, with Cork standing in the way of Kilkenny retaining their title. In a close game, Langton proved the hero by scoring the winning point in a narrow 2–4 to 2–3 victory. It was his second All-Ireland medal.

=== Senior ===
==== Early success ====
Langton made his senior debut during Kilkenny's unsuccessful 1938 campaign.

In 1939 Kilkenny reclaimed the provincial title. A 2–12 to 4–3 victory gave Langton his first Leinster medal. The subsequent All-Ireland final pitted Kilkenny against Cork. In one of the most iconic championship deciders of all-time, played on the day that World War II broke out, the climax of the game was played in a ferocious thunderstorm. While a draw looked likely as the hour drew to a close, Paddy Phelan sent a seventy-yard free in towards the Cork goalmouth. The sliotar was gobbled up by the defence and cleared, but only as far as Jimmy Kelly who sent it straight over the bar for a one-point lead. Immediately after the puck-out the referee blew the whistle and Kilkenny were victorious on a score line of 2–7 to 3–3. The win gave Langton an All-Ireland medal in the senior grade.

Despite being in only his third year of senior hurling, Langton was appointed captain of the Kilkenny team in 1940. He secured a second successive Leinster medal that year, as Kilkenny retained their provincial crown following a 3–6 to 2–5 defeat of Dublin. The subsequent All-Ireland decider on 1 September 1940 brought Kilkenny and Limerick together for the last great game between the two outstanding teams of the decade. Early in the second-half Kilkenny took a four-point lead, however, once Mick Mackey was deployed at midfield he proceeded to dominate the game. Limerick hung on to win the game on a score line of 3–7 to 1–7.

==== Narrow defeats ====
Kilkenny surrendered their provincial crown to Dublin in 1942, however, both sides faced each other in the provincial decider again in 1943. A 3–9 to 2–6 victory gave Langton his third Leinster medal. On 1 August 1943, Kilkenny faced Antrim in the All-Ireland semi-final. While many expected Langton's side to brush the Ulster challenge aside, a record crowd at Corrigan Park witnessed one of the biggest shocks in the history of the championship. Danny McAllister, Kevin Armstrong and Joe Mullan got the goals as Antrim triumphed by 3–3 to 1–6.

In 1945 Langton won a fourth Leinster medal as Kilkenny trounced the reigning champions Dublin by 5–12 to 3–4. Kilkenny later faced Tipperary in the All-Ireland final on 2 September 1945. Tipperary played into a strong sun in the opening half and built up a commanding lead. Kilkenny staged a comeback in the second half, however, Tipp still won the game by 5–6 to 3–6.

Langton added a fifth Leinster medal to his collection in 1946 as Kilkenny had a narrow 3–8 to 1–12 defeat of Dublin. Old rivals Cork provided the opposition in the subsequent All-Ireland final on 1 September 1946. While some had written off Cork's chances, they took an interval lead of four points. With ten minutes remaining Cork's lead was reduced to just two points, however, goals by Mossy O'Riordan and Joe Kelly secured a 7–6 to 3–8 victory and a third All-Ireland final defeat for Langton.

==== A second All-Ireland ====
Kilkenny made it three provincial titles in succession in 1947, however, Langton missed the victory over Dublin. The subsequent All-Ireland final on 7 September 1947 was a repeat of the previous year with Cork providing the opposition. The stakes were high for both sides as Cork were aiming for a record sixth championship in seven seasons while Kilkenny were aiming to avoid becoming the first team to lose three consecutive All-Ireland finals. In what has been described as one of the greatest deciders of all-time, little separated the two teams over the course of the hour. A Joe Kelly goal put Cork one point ahead with time almost up, however, Terry Leahy proved to be the hero of the day. He converted a free to level the sides again before sending over the match-winner from the subsequent puck-out. With that, the game was over and Kilkenny were the champions by 0–14 to 2–7. It was the fifth time that Kilkenny had pipped Cork by a single point in the championship decider, while it also resulted in Langton winning a second All-Ireland medal.

After two years of decline, Kilkenny were back in 1950. A narrow 3–11 to 2–11 defeat of new arrivals Wexford gave Langton a sixth Leinster medal. He later lined out in his sixth All-Ireland final on 3 September 1950, with age-old rivals Tipperary providing the opposition. In a dull affair, Tipp looked to be heading for victory when Seán Kenny scored a goal to put the team four points ahead with just one minute left to play. Kilkenny fought back and a Jimmy Kelly goal from the puck-out reduced the deficit to just one point again. As "the Cats" were about to launch one final attack, the referee blew the whistle and Tipperary had won by 1–9 to 1–8.

==== Decline ====
In 1953 Kilkenny lined out in the provincial decider once again. A narrow 1–13 to 3–5 defeat of Wexford gave Langton his seventh and final Leinster medal. Kilkenny later faced Galway in the All-Ireland semi-final, however, Galway pulled off a shock victory by 3–5 to 1–10.

Langton retired from inter-county hurling following Kilkenny's defeat by Wexford in the Leinster semi-final in 1954.

=== Inter-provincial ===
Langton also had the honour of lining out with Leinster in the inter-provincial series of games. He made his debut in 1940 and was a regular on the team until 1954. His inter-provincial career coincided with a prolonged period of dominance by Munster and a breakthrough by Connacht.

In 1941 Langton played in his second inter-provincial final, with Munster providing the opposition once again. A narrow 2–5 to 2–4 victory gave Langton his first Railway Cup medal, while it denied the southern province a remarkable fifth successive title.

After a series of defeats in the intervening period, Langton lined out in his final inter-provincial final in 1954. A 0–9 to 0–5 defeat of Munster gave him his second and final Railway Cup medal.

== Recognition ==
In retirement from playing, Langton came to be regarded as one of the greatest hurlers of all-time.

Thirty years after he last lined out with Kilkenny, he was doubly honoured in the GAA's centenary year in 1984. That year he was presented with the All-Time All-Star award, while he was also chosen at left wing-forward on the Hurling Team of the Century. He retained that position on the Hurling Team of the Millennium in 2000.

== Honours ==
=== Team ===
Kilkenny CBS

- Leinster Senior Colleges' Hurling Championship (1): 1936

Éire Óg

- Kilkenny Senior Hurling Championship (4): 1938, 1944, 1945, 1947

Kilkenny

- All-Ireland Senior Hurling Championship (2): 1939, 1947
- Leinster Senior Hurling Championship (7): 1939, 1940 (c), 1943, 1945, 1946, 1950, 1953
- All-Ireland Minor Hurling Championship (2): 1935, 1936
- Leinster Minor Hurling Championship (2): 1935, 1936

Leinster

- Railway Cup (2): 1941, 1954

=== Individual ===
Honours

- Hurling Team of the Millennium: Left wing-forward
- Hurling Team of the Century: Left wing-forward
- Kilkenny Hurling Team of the Century: Right wing-forward
- All-Time All-Star: 1984
- GAA Hall of Fame Inductee: 2013

Sporting positions
Preceded by Jimmy Walsh	Kilkenny Senior Hurling Captain; 1940	Succeeded by Jimmy Walsh
Awards
Preceded by Pa 'Fowler' McInerney	GAA All-Time All-Star Award; 1984	Succeeded by Eudie Coughlan
