= Ted O'Sullivan (hurler) =

Irish hurler (1920–1968)

Personal information
- Native name: Tadhg Ó Súilleabháin (Irish)
- Born: 24 February 1920 Ballinacurra, County Cork, Ireland
- Died: 30 July 1968 (aged 48) Castlemartyr, County Cork, Ireland
- Occupation: Labourer
- Height: 5 ft 10 in (178 cm)

Sport
- Sport: Hurling
- Position: Full-forward
Clubs
- Years: Club
- 1938-1939 1940-1941 1942-1945 1946-1954 1946: Midleton; Blackrock; St Finbarr's; Castlemartyr → Imokilly
Club titles
- Cork titles: 2
Inter-county
Years	County	Apps (scores)
1939-1943	Cork	13 (23-05)
Inter-county titles
- Munster titles: 2
- All-Irelands: 2
- NHL: 2

Ted O'Sullivan (24 February 1920 – 30 July 1968) was an Irish hurler. At club level he played with Midleton, Blackrock, St Finbarr's and Castlemartyr and was also a member of the Cork senior hurling team.

== Club career ==
Born in Ballinacurra, County Cork, O'Sullivan first played hurling at juvenile and underage levels with the St Enda's club. He enjoyed his first success in 1938 when the club secured the Cork MHC title after a defeat of Seán Clárach's in the final. By that stage O'Sullivan had also joined the Midleton senior team and was full-forward when they suffered a defeat by Glen Rovers in the 1938 final.

O'Sullivan spent two seasons with Blackrock after transferring to the club in 1941, before later transferring to St Finbarr's. His tenure with the southside club was a successful one with "the Barr's" claiming consecutive Cork SHC titles in 1942 and 1943. After four seasons with St Finbarr's, O'Sullivan moved clubs once again when he transferred to East Cork club Castlemartyr. Over the course of the following decade he won four East Cork JAHC titles as well as a Cork JHC title in 1951. O'Sullivan also earned a call-up to the Imokilly divisional team during this time.

== Inter-county career ==
O'Sullivan's performances at juvenile level with St Enda's resulted in him being drafted onto the Cork minor hurling team in 1938. It was a successful season for the team, which culminated with a defeat of Dublin in the 1938 All-Ireland minor final. O'Sullivan was immediately drafted onto the Cork junior hurling team, however, he was denied a second All-Ireland medal of the season as Cork were beaten by London in the 1938 All-Ireland junior final.

As one of the minor team's top goal-scorers throughout the championship, O'Sullivan's progression onto the Cork senior hurling team was immediate. He made a number of appearances throughout the 1938-39 National League and scored three goals when he made his championship debut against Waterford in the 1939 Munster SHC semi-final. O'Sullivan was at full-forward for the 1939 All-Ireland final defeat by Kilkenny, however, he ended the championship Cork's top scorer with 7-01.

O'Sullivan claimed his first national silverware when Cork secured consecutive National League titles in 1940 and 1941. At the end of the latter season he won his first All-Ireland medal after scoring 2-01 in the defeat of Dublin in the 1941 All-Ireland final. After playing no part in Cork's successful 1942 championship season, O'Sullivan was recalled to the team the following season. He claimed a second All-Ireland winners' medal after scoring 1-02 in the 5-16 to 0-04 defeat of Antrim in the 1943 All-Ireland final.

Four years after his Cork senior team career ended, O'Sullivan returned to the inter-county scene when he was once again called up to the Cork junior team. After securing the Munster JHC title he ended the season by becoming one of the few players to have made a clean sweep of all the available All-Ireland titles when he lined out at full-forward in Cork's defeat of London in the 1947 All-Ireland junior final.

== Personal life and death ==
O'Sullivan married East Cork camogie player Margaret O'Brien in 1947 and had four children. He died from coronary thrombosis on 30 July 1968, aged 48.

== Honours ==
St Enda's

- Cork Minor Hurling Championship: 1938

St Finbarr's

- Cork Senior Hurling Championship: 1942, 1943

Castlemartyr

- Cork Junior Hurling Championship: 1951
- East Cork Junior A Hurling Championship: 1946, 1950, 1951, 1954

Cork

- All-Ireland Senior Hurling Championship: 1941, 1943
- Munster Senior Hurling Championship: 1939, 1943
- National Hurling League: 1939-40, 1940-41
- All-Ireland Minor Hurling Championship: 1938
- Munster Minor Hurling Championship: 1938
