= Bobby Brannigan =

Irish hurler (1918–1997)

Personal information
- Native name: Roibeard Ó Branagáin (Irish)
- Born: 13 October 1918 Kilkenny, Ireland
- Died: 4 March 1997 (aged 78) Kilkenny, Ireland
- Occupation: Plumber

Sport
- Sport: Hurling
- Position: Left wing-forward
Club
- Years: Club
- James Stephens
Club titles
- Kilkenny titles: 0
Inter-county
- Years: County
- 1938-1939: Kilkenny
Inter-county titles
- Leinster titles: 1
- All-Irelands: 1
- NHL: 0

Robert Patrick Brannigan (18 October 1918 – 4 March 1997) was an Irish hurler who played for Kilkenny Senior Championship club James Stephens. He played for the Kilkenny senior hurling team on a number of occasions, during which time he usually lined out as a left wing-forward.

== Honours ==
Kilkenny

- All-Ireland Senior Hurling Championship (1): 1939
- Leinster Senior Hurling Championship (1): 1939
- All-Ireland Minor Hurling Championship (2): 1935, 1936
- Leinster Minor Hurling Championship (2): 1935, 1936
