= Jimmy Walsh (Kilkenny hurler) =

Irish hurler (1911–1977)

Personal information
- Native name: Séamus Breathnach (Irish)
- Born: 4 February 1911 Ballyhale, County Kilkenny, Ireland
- Died: 26 December 1977 (aged 66) Kilkenny, Ireland

Sport
- Sport: Hurling
- Position: Right wing-forward
Club
- Years: Club
- 1928–1946: Carrickshock
Club titles
- Kilkenny titles: 6
Inter-county
- Years: County
- 1932–1944: Kilkenny
Inter-county titles
- Leinster titles: 7
- All-Irelands: 4
- NHL: 1

James Walsh (4 February 1911 – 26 December 1977) was an Irish hurler who played as a left wing-forward for the Kilkenny senior team.

Born in Ballyhale, County Kilkenny, Walsh first arrived on the inter-county scene at the age of twenty-one when he first linked up with the Kilkenny senior team. He made his debut during the 1932 championship. Walsh immediately became a regular member of the starting fifteen and won one All-Ireland medals, seven Leinster medals and eight National League medals. The All-Ireland-winning captain in 1932, he was an All-Ireland runner-up on two occasions.

As a member of the Leinster inter-provincial team on a number of occasions, Walsh won two Railway Cup medals. At club level he was a six-time championship medallist with Carrickshock.

Walsh retired from inter-county hurling following the conclusion of the 1944 championship.

== Playing career ==
=== Club ===
In 1928 Walsh was just seventeen-years-old when he was included as a key member of the Carrickshock junior hurling team. That year he won a Kilkenny Junior Hurling Championship medal in that grade, as Carrickshcok secured promotion to the senior ranks following a 2–3 to 1–2 defeat of Wellbrook in the decider.

Three years later in 1931, Carrickshock reached the senior decider, having been runners-up in their inaugural senior championship campaign in 1929. Urlingford provided the opposition on that occasion, however, a 5–8 to 3–8 victory gave Walsh his first championship medal.

Carrickshock lost the next four championship deciders, and it was 1938 before Walsh reached his next senior showpiece. A 2–5 to 1–5 defeat of Éire Óg gave him a second championship medal.

Back-to-back titles proved beyond Carrickshock again in 1939, however, the team was back in a third successive decider the following year. A narrow 1–4 to 1–2 defeat of Mullinavat gave Walsh a third championship medal.

Old rivals Éire Óg provided the opposition in the 1941 county final, however, Carrickshock finally retained the title following a one-point 4–5 to 3–7 victory. It was Walsh's fourth championship medal.

Carrickshock's great run of success continued in 1942 as the club qualified for a fifth successive final. Threecastles, who were appearing in their first decider in thirty-five years, were the opponents, however, a 3–2 to 2–3 victory gave Walsh his fifth championship medal.

In 1943 Carrickshock set a remarkable record in Kilkenny hurling by winning a fourth successive championship. The 3–6 to 1–3 defeat of Mullinavat gave Walsh a sixth championship medal.

Five-in-a-row proved beyond Carrickshock, with the club losing the next three championship deciders. Walsh's last game for the club was the 1946 final defeat by Thomastown.

=== Inter-county ===
==== Early successes ====
In 1932 Walsh joined the Kilkenny senior hurling team and had the honour of being appointed captain of the side in his inaugural season. He won his first Leinster medal that year following a 4–6 to 3–5 defeat of Dublin. The All-Ireland final on 4 September 1932 saw Clare provide the opposition for the first time in almost twenty years. In a low-scoring game, Clare's Tull Considine scored two goals and was foiled for what would almost certainly have been a third. These goals were negated by Kilkenny's three goal-scoring heroes Matty Power, Martin White and Lory Meagher, who scored a remarkable goal from a line ball. The final score of 3–3 to 2–3 gave victory to Kilkenny and gave Walsh an All-Ireland medal while he also had the honour of lifting the Liam MacCarthy Cup. At 21 years and 222 days old, he remains one of the youngest All-Ireland-winning captains of all-time.

1933 saw Walsh add a National Hurling League medal to his collection following a 3–8 to 1–3 defeat of Limerick. He later won a second Leinster medal following a stunning comeback against Dublin which produced a 7–5 to 2–5 victory. The All-Ireland final on 3 September 1933 saw a record crowd of 45,176 travel to Croke Park to see Kilkenny face and up-and-coming Limerick. After being level at the interval, the game remained close in the second half until a solo-run goal by Johnny Dunne sealed a 1–7 to 0–6 victory. It was Walsh's second consecutive All-Ireland medal.

==== Continued dominance ====
After surrendering their provincial crown to Dublin in 1934, Kilkenny faced Laois in the decider again the following year. A 3–8 to 0–6 victory gave Walsh a third Leinster medal. Another record crowd gathered at Croke Park for the All-Ireland final between Kilkenny and Limerick on 1 September 1935. In spite of rain falling throughout the entire game both sides served up a classic. At the beginning of the second-half Lory Meagher sent over a huge point from midfield giving Kilkenny a lead which they wouldn't surrender. A narrow 2–5 to 2–4 victory gave Walsh a third All-Ireland medal.

Kilkenny dominated the provincial series again in 1936 and Walsh won his fourth Leinster medal following a 4–6 to 2–5 defeat of Laois. The lure of a Kilkenny-Limerick clash brought a record crowd of over 50,000 to Croke Park for the All-Ireland decider on 6 September 1936. The first half produced a game that lived up to the previous clashes, and Limerick had a two-point advantage at half-time. Jackie Power scored two first-half goals, while a solo-run goal by captain Mick Mackey in the second-half helped Limerick to a 5–6 to 1–5 victory.

After being dropped in 1937, Walsh was recalled to the team for Kilkenny's unsuccessful championship campaign in 1938. The following year he was appointed captain for the second time and won a fifth Leinster medal following a 2–12 to 4–3 defeat of reigning All-Ireland champions Dublin. The subsequent All-Ireland final with Cork on 3 September 1939 is regarded as one of the most famous championship deciders of all-time. The game was an exciting one with an explosive finish, as a spectacular thunderstorm lit up proceedings. Willie Campbell landed a long-range free in the net for an equalising goal for Cork and a draw looked likely. Terry Leahy doubled on a Paddy Phelan 70-yard free to secure the winning point for Kilkenny on the stroke of full-time. The 2–7 to 3–3 score line gave Kilkenny the victory and gave Walsh a fourth All-Ireland medal.

==== Decline ====
Walsh won a sixth Leinster medal in 1940 following a 3–6 to 2–5 defeat of Dublin. The All-Ireland decider on 1 September 1940 brought Kilkenny and Limerick together for the last great game between the two outstanding teams of the decade. Early in the second-half Kilkenny took a four-point lead, however, once captain Mick Mackey was deployed at midfield he proceeded to dominate the game. Limerick hung on to win the game on a score line of 3–7 to 1–7.

In 1943 Walsh collected his seventh and final Leinster medal following a 3–9 to 2–6 defeat of Dublin. Kilkenny were later defeated by Antrim in the All-Ireland semi-final in one of the greatest hurling shocks of all-time.

A defeat by Wexford in the 1944 Leinster semi-final brought the curtain down on Walsh's inter-county career.

=== Inter-provincial ===
In 1933 Walsh was at right wing-forward on the Leinster team that faced fierce rivals Munster in the inter-provincial final. A thrilling contest resulted in a narrow 3–6 to 2–6 victory for Leinster, and a first Railway Cup medal for Walsh.

After back-to-back successes for the southern province, Leinster were back in the decider once again in 1936. A narrow one-point 2–8 to 3–4 victory gave Walsh a second Railway Cup medal.

== Honours ==
=== Player ===
Carrickshock

- Kilkenny Senior Hurling Championship (6): 1931, 1938, 1940, 1941, 1942, 1943
- Kilkenny Junior Hurling Championship (1): 1928

Kilkenny

- All-Ireland Senior Hurling Championship (4): 1932 (c), 1933, 1935, 1939 (c)
- Leinster Senior Hurling Championship (7): 1932, 1933, 1935, 1936, 1939, 1940 (c), 1943 (c)
- National Hurling League (1): 1932–33

Leinster

- Railway Cup (6): 1933, 1936

Sporting positions
Preceded by Lory Meagher	Kilkenny Senior Hurling Captain; 1932	Succeeded by Ned Doyle
Preceded by Paddy Larkin	Kilkenny Senior Hurling Captain; 1939	Succeeded by Jim Langton
Preceded by	Kilkenny Senior Hurling Captain; 1942–1944	Succeeded by Peter Blanchfield
Achievements
Preceded by Eudie Coughlan (Cork)	All-Ireland Senior Hurling Final winning captain 1932	Succeeded by Eddie Doyle (Kilkenny)
Preceded by Mick Daniels (Dublin)	All-Ireland Senior Hurling Final winning captain 1939	Succeeded by Mick Mackey (Limerick)
