= Ted O'Sullivan =

Ted O'Sullivan may refer to:

- Timothy O'Sullivan (Fianna Fáil politician) (1899–1971), known as Ted, Irish Fianna Fáil Party politician from West Cork
- Ted O'Sullivan (hurler) (1920–1968), Irish hurler
