= Danny McAllister =

Danny McAllister may refer to:

- Danny McAllister (hurler) (1919-2008), Irish hurler for County Antrim
- Danny McAllister (rugby league) (born 1974), Australian rugby league player
