= 1933 All-Ireland Senior Hurling Championship =

Championship details
- Dates: 23 April – 3 September 1933
- Teams: 13

All-Ireland champions
- Winning team: Kilkenny (10th win)
- Captain: Eddie Doyle

All-Ireland Finalists
- Losing team: Limerick
- Captain: Micky Fitzgibbon

Provincial champions
- Munster: Limerick
- Leinster: Kilkenny
- Ulster: Not Played
- Connacht: Not Played

Championship statistics
- No. matches played: 13
- Goals total: 83 (6.38 per game)
- Points total: 137 (10.53 per game)
- Top Scorer: Mick Mackey (4–8)
- All-Star Team: See here

The 1933 All-Ireland Senior Hurling Championship was the 47th staging of the All-Ireland Senior Hurling Championship, the Gaelic Athletic Association's premier inter-county hurling tournament. The draw for the Munster fixtures took place on 26 February 1933, while the draw for the Leinster fixtures took place on 5 March 1933. The championship began on 23 April 1933 and ended on 3 September 1933.

Kilkenny entered the championship as the defending champions.

On 3 September 1933, Kilkenny won the championship following a 1–7 to 0–6 defeat of Limerick in the All-Ireland final. This was their second All-Ireland title in succession and their 10th All-Ireland title overall.

Limerick's Mick Mackey was the championship's top scorer with 4–8.

== Teams ==
A total of 13 teams contested the championship, the same number of participants from the previous championship. There were no new entrants.

=== Team summaries ===
Team	Colours	Most recent success		
Team	Colours	All-Ireland	Provincial	League
Clare	Saffron and blue	1914	1932	
Cork	Red and white	1931	1931	1929–30
Dublin	Blue and navy	1927	1930	1928–29
Galway	Maroon and white	1923		1930–31
Kerry	Green and gold	1891	1891	
Kilkenny	Black and amber	1932	1932	1932–33
Laois	Blue and white	1915	1915	
Limerick	Green and white	1921	1923	
Meath	Green and gold			
Offaly	Green, white and gold			
Tipperary	Blue and gold	1930	1930	1927–28
Waterford	White and blue			
Wexford	Purple and gold	1910	1918	

== Results ==
=== Leinster Senior Hurling Championship ===
Quarter-finals

7 May 1933 Quarter-final	Meath	3–5 – 1–4	Wexford	Croke Park, Dublin

14 May 1933 Quarter-final	Offaly	3–6 – 1–9	Laois	St. Brendan's Park, Birr

Semi-finals

2 July 1933 Semi-final	Kilkenny	5–5 – 2–3	Meath	Nowlan Park, Kilkenny

9 July 1933 Semi-final	Dublin	2–3 – 1–3	Offaly	O'Moore Park, Portlaoise

Final

23 July 1933 Final	Kilkenny	7–5 – 5–5	Dublin	Wexford Park, Wexford
	J Fitzpatrick 2–0, Matty Power 2–0, J Walsh 1–1, J Dunne 1–1, L Meagher 1–1, Martin Power 0–1, T Leahy 0–1.		J Browne 2–0, S Hegarty 1–2, J O'Connell 1–0, T Quinlan 1–0, C McMahon 0–1, N Wade 0–1, S Muldowney 0–1.

=== Munster Senior Hurling Championship ===
Quarter-finals

23 April 1933 Quarter-final	Kerry	4–6 – 10–3	Cork	Austin Stack Park, Tralee

28 May 1933 Quarter-final	Limerick	6–8 – 1–4	Clare	Thurles Sportsfield, Thurles

Semi-finals

21 May 1933 Semi-final	Waterford	3–3 – 3–3	Tipperary	Walsh Park, Waterford

25 June 1933 Semi-final replay	Tipperary	5–2 – 5–5	Waterford	Carrick-on-Suir

16 July 1933 Semi-final	Limerick	2–9 – 1–6	Cork	Thurles Sportsfield, Thurles

Final

6 August 1933 Final	Limerick	3–7 – 1–2	Waterford	Cork Athletic Grounds, Cork
	M Mackey 2–1, C O'Brien 1–2, P Ryan 0–2, P Clohessy 0–1, T Ryan 0–1.		L Byrne 1–0, C Ware 0–2.

=== All-Ireland Senior Hurling Championship ===
Semi-final

13 August 1933 Semi-final	Kilkenny	5–10 – 3–8	Galway	St. Brendan's Park, Birr

Final

3 September 1933 Final	Kilkenny	1–7 – 0–6	Limerick	Croke Park, Dublin
				Attendance: 45,176; Referee: S Jordan (Galway)

== Championship statistics ==
=== Miscellaneous ===
- The Munster final between Limerick and Waterford ends in disarray as a fight breaks out amongst the players. Many spectators rush the field and also join in the melee. Officials fail to clear the field to restart the match so Limerick are awarded the title as they were winning by a considerable amount at the time.
- In the All Ireland final, the teams were level (38mins) – longer than either side led. It's one of only two AISHC finals ever where this has happened (1922).

== Sources ==
- Corry, Eoghan, The GAA Book of Lists (Hodder Headline Ireland, 2005).
- Donegan, Des, The Complete Handbook of Gaelic Games (DBA Publications Limited, 2005).
