= Bobby Hinks =

Irish hurler

Personal information
- Native name: Roibeard Mac Aonais (Irish)
- Born: 20 November 1918 Hugginstown, County Kilkenny, Ireland
- Died: 14 December 1995 (aged 77) Waterford, Ireland
- Occupation: Foreman

Sport
- Sport: Hurling
- Position: Right wing-back
Club
- Years: Club
- Carrickshock
Club titles
- Kilkenny titles: 5
Inter-county
- Years: County
- 1939-1941: Kilkenny
Inter-county titles
- Leinster titles: 2
- All-Irelands: 1

Robert Hinks (20 November 1918 – 14 December 1995) was an Irish hurler who played as a right wing-back for the Kilkenny senior team.

Born in Carrickshock, County Kilkenny, Hinks first played competitive hurling whilst at school at Mount Sion CBS. He arrived on the inter-county scene at the age of seventeen when he first linked up with the Kilkenny minor team. He made his senior debut during the 1939 championship. Hinks went on to enjoy a brief career, winning one All-Ireland medal and two Leinster medals.

As a member of the Leinster inter-provincial team Hinks won nine Railway Cup medal as captain. At club level he was a five-time championship medallist with Carrickshock.
