= Jimmy Phelan (hurler) =

Irish hurler

Personal information
- Native name: Séamas Ó Faoláin (Irish)
- Born: 6 April 1917 Ballyragget, County Kilkenny, Ireland
- Died: 5 January 2006 (aged 88) Carlow, Ireland
- Occupation: Accountant

Sport
- Sport: Hurling
- Position: Left corner-forward
Clubs
- Years: Club
- Tullaroan; Éire Óg; Mount Sion; Carlow Town
Inter-county
Years	County	Apps (scores)
1939-1942	Kilkenny	8 (6-4)
Inter-county titles
- Leinster titles: 2
- All-Irelands: 1
- NHL: 0

James Phelan (6 April 1917 – 5 January 2006) was an Irish hurler who played as a left corner-forward for the Kilkenny senior team.

Born in Ballyragget, County Kilkenny, Phelan first played competitive hurling whilst at school in Mount Sion CBS. He arrived on the inter-county scene at the age of sixteen when he first linked up with the Waterford minor team. He made his senior debut for Kilkenny in the 1939 championship. Phelan's senior career was brief but successful, winning one All-Ireland medal and two Leinster medals. He was an All-Ireland runner-up on one occasion.

As a member of the Leinster inter-provincial team for three years, Phelan won one Railway Cup medal in 1941. At club level he enjoyed a distinguished career with Mount Sion, Tullaroan, Éire Óg and Carlow Town.

Throughout his brief career Phelan made just 8 championship appearances. His retirement came following a defeat by Dublin in the 1942 championship.

In retirement from playing, Phelan became involved in team management and coaching at club and inter-county levels. As coach of Carlow he guided the team to the All-Ireland successes at junior level in 1960 and intermediate level in 1962.

== Playing career ==
=== College ===
Phelan first played competitive hurling during his tenure at Mount Sion CBS in Waterford. Described as one of the greatest Harty Cup players of all time, he enjoyed little success in this competition but was chosen for Munster in the inter-provincial colleges series. As the only Mount Sion representative on the team, Phelan won two All-Ireland medals.

=== Club ===
Phelan first enjoyed success at club level with the Mount Sion club in Waterford, winning back-to-back championship medals in the minor grade in 1933 and 1934.

After joining the Mount Sion junior team, Phelan won a championship medal in this grade in 1935.

Mount Sion, at their first attempt, won their way into the semi-final of the senior championship, where they caused a major shock by beating Decies kingpins, Erin's Own in search of an incredible ten-a-row. Mount Sion later beat Tallow by 2–6 to 1–5 in the 1936 final, with Phelan lining out at centre-forward. The club, however, lost the game as a Tallow objection, due to one of the Mount Sion players having hurled in Wexford that same year, was upheld. This unsatisfactory conclusion brought the curtain down on Phelan's club career in Waterford.

On returning to Kilkenny, Phelan played with Tulalroan, however, he enjoyed little success. When that club disbanded for a short while he threw in his lot with Éire Óg, a highly regarded city team and it was with them he played his only championship decider in 1941. A narrow 4–5 to 3–7 defeat was the result on that occasion.

Phelan's working life saw him join the Carlow Town team.

=== Inter-county ===
Phelan made his senior debut for Kilkenny in the provincial decider in 1939. A 2–12 to 4–3 victory gave him his first Leinster medal. The subsequent All-Ireland final pitted Kilkenny against Cork. In one of the most iconic championship deciders of all time, played on the day that World War II broke out, the climax of the game was played in a ferocious thunder storm. While a draw looked likely as the hour drew to a close, Paddy Phelan sent a seventy-yard free in towards the Cork goalmouth. The sliotar was gobbled up by the defence and cleared, but only as far as Jimmy Kelly who sent it straight over the bar for a one-point lead. Immediately after the puck-out the referee blew the whistle and Kilkenny were victorious on a score line of 2–7 to 3-3. Phelan contributed 2-1 and collected an All-Ireland medal.

In 1940 Phelan secured a second successive Leinster medal, as Kilkenny retained their provincial crown following a 3–6 to 2–5 defeat of Dublin. The subsequent All-Ireland decider on 1 September 1940 brought Kilkenny and Limerick together for the last great game between the two outstanding teams of the decade. Early in the second-half Kilkenny took a four-point lead, however, once Mick Mackey was deployed at midfield he proceeded to dominate the game. Limerick hung on to win the game on a score line of 3–7 to 1–7.

An outbreak of foot and mouth disease hampered Kilkenny's championship aspirations in 1941, while the following year Kilkenny lost out to Dublin in the provincial series. Phelan brought the curtain down on his inter-county career following this defeat.

=== Inter-provincial ===
Phelan also had the honour of lining out with Leinster in the inter-provincial series of games. He made his debut in 1940 and was a regular on the team for three seasons.

In 1941 Phelan played in his second inter-provincial final, with Munster providing the opposition. A narrow 2–5 to 2–4 victory gave Phelan his sole Railway Cup medal, while it denied the southern province a remarkable fifth successive title.

== Coaching career ==
In retirement from playing Phelan became involved in team management. He coached the Carlow team to a junior All-Ireland title in 1960 and, two years later 1962, his team collected an All-Ireland intermediate title.

== Personal life ==
Phelan was born in Ballyragget, County Kilkenny in 1918. He was educated in Waterford, and twice he tasted success in the Harty Cup, the Munster colleges championship. He joined the Irish Sugar Company in Carlow in 1937. By the time of his retirement in 1982 Phelan had attained the position of chief accountant.

Phelan died in Carlow in January 2006. He was the last surviving member of the Kilkenny team that won the All-Ireland title in 1939.
