= 1940 Railway Cup Hurling Championship =

Irish hurling competition

1940 Railway Cup
- Dates: 25 February – 17 March 1940
- Teams: Connacht; Leinster; Munster
- Champions: Munster (9th title)

Tournament statistics
- Matches played: 2
- Goals scored: 14 (7 per match)
- Points scored: 22 (11 per match)
- Top scorer(s): Jimmy Phelan (3-01)

The 1940 Railway Cup Hurling Championship was the 14th series of the Railway Cup, an annual hurling championship organised by the Gaelic Athletic Association. The championship took place between 25 February and 17 March 1940. It was contested by Connacht, Leinster and Munster.

Munster entered the championship as the defending champions.

On 17 March 1940, Munster won the Railway Cup after a 4–09 to 5–04 defeat of Leinster in the final at Croke Park, Dublin. It was their 9th Railway Cup title overall and their fourth in succession.

Leinster's Jimmy Phelan was the Railway Cup's top scorer with 3-01.

== Results ==
Semi-final

| 25 February 1940 Semi-final | Leinster | 4-05 - 1-04 | Connacht | St. Brendan's Park, Birr |
| | M Brophy 2-0, S O'Brien 1-0, P Farrell 1-0, J Walsh 0-3, J Langton 0-1, P Phelan 0-1. | | J Hanniffy 1-0, MJ Flaherty 0-1, Forde 0-1, DJ Costelloe 0-1, T Lambert 0-1. |

Final

| 17 March 1940 Final | Munster | 4-09 - 5-04 | Leinster | Croke Park, Dublin |
| | P McMahon 2-1, J Quirke 1-2, M Mackey 0-4, M Brennan 1-0, J Mackey 0-1, J Barrett 0-1. | | J Phelan 3-1, M Brophy 1-0, P Phelan 0-2, S O'Brien 1-0, P Farrell 0-1. |

== Top scorers ==
Overall

| Rank | Player | County | Tally | Total | Matches | Average |
|---|---|---|---|---|---|---|
| 1 | Jimmy Phelan | Leinster | 3-01 | 10 | 1 | 10.00 |
| 2 | Mick Brophy | Leinster | 3-00 | 9 | 2 | 4.50 |
| 1 | Paddy McMahon | Munster | 2-01 | 7 | 1 | 7.00 |

Single game

| Rank | Player | County | Tally | Total | Opposition |
|---|---|---|---|---|---|
| 1 | Jimmy Phelan | Leinster | 3-01 | 10 | Munster |
| 2 | Paddy McMahon | Munster | 2-01 | 7 | Leinster |
| 3 | Mick Brophy | Leinster | 2-00 | 6 | Munster |
| 4 | Johnny Quirke | Munster | 1-02 | 5 | Leinster |
| 5 | Mick Mackey | Munster | 0-04 | 4 | Leinster |

== Sources ==
- Donegan, Des, The Complete Handbook of Gaelic Games (DBA Publications Limited, 2005).
