= 1940 All-Ireland Senior Hurling Championship =

Championship details
- Dates: 5 May – 1 September 1940
- Teams: 13

All-Ireland champions
- Winning team: Limerick (6th win)
- Captain: Mick Mackey

All-Ireland Finalists
- Losing team: Kilkenny
- Captain: Jim Langton

Provincial champions
- Munster: Limerick
- Leinster: Kilkenny
- Ulster: Not Played
- Connacht: Not Played

Championship statistics
- No. matches played: 14
- Top Scorer: Paddy McMahon (7-02)
- All-Star Team: See here

The 1940 All-Ireland Senior Hurling Championship was the 54th staging of the All-Ireland Senior Hurling Championship, the Gaelic Athletic Association's premier inter-county hurling tournament. The championship ended on 1 September 1940.

The championship was won by Limerick who secured the title following a 3–7 to 1–7 defeat of Kilkenny in the All-Ireland final. This was their 6th All-Ireland title, their first in four championship seasons.

Kilkenny were the defending champions.

== Teams ==
=== Overview ===
A total of thirteen teams contested the championship, including all of the teams from the 1939 championship.

=== Team summaries ===
Team	Colours	Most recent success		
Team	Colours	All-Ireland	Provincial	League
Clare	Saffron and blue	1914	1932	
Cork	Red and white	1931	1931	1939–40
Dublin	Navy and blue	1938	1938	1938–39
Galway	Maroon and white	1923	1922	1930–31
Kilkenny	Black and amber	1939	1939	1932–33
Laois	Blue and white	1915	1915	
Limerick	Green and white	1936	1936	1937–38
Meath	Green and gold			
Offaly	Green, white and gold			
Tipperary	Blue and gold	1937	1937	1927–28
Waterford	Blue and white		1938	
Westmeath	Maroon and white			
Wexford	Purple and gold	1910	1918	

== Provincial championships ==
=== Leinster Senior Hurling Championship ===
First round

5 May 1940 First round	Westmeath	5–07 – 2–01	Meath	Cusack Park, Mullingar
	Raleigh 1–1, McNiece 1–1, S Hegarty 0–4, O'Brien 1–0, Dixon 1–0, Leonard 1–0, Smith 0–1.		McGrath 1–1, Clarke 1–0.

Quarter-finals

12 May 1940 Quarter-final	Laois	4–08 – 3–04	Offaly	St. Brendan's Park, Birr

26 May 1940 Quarter-final	Westmeath	2–05 – 2–04	Wexford	Croke Park, Dublin
	T Colbert 2–0, S Hegarty 0–2, J Raleigh 0–1, E O'Brien 0–1, F White 0–1.		A Kealy 1–1, G Butler 1–0, J Duggan 0–1, P Boggan 0–1, M Byrne 0–1.	Referee: E McMahon (Dublin)

Semi-finals

9 June 1940 Semi-final	Dublin	2–08 – 1–08	Laois	Nowlan Park, Kilkenny
	N Wade 0–4, M McSweeney 1–0, M Brophy 1–0, D Devitt 0–2, M O'Brien 0–1, M McDonnell 0–1.		D Griffin 1–2, T Fitzpatrick 0–3, D Cranny 0–2, P Norton 0–1.

14 June 1940 Semi-final	Kilkenny	3–16 – 1–05	Westmeath	Geraldine Park, Athy
	J Phelan 1–3, J Langton 1–2, J Kelly 1–2, P Phelan 1–2, J O'Brien 0–3, J Walsh 0–2, M Gargan 0–1, B Hinks 0–1.		S Hegarty 0–4, R Colbert 1–0, C Boland 0–1.

Final

21 July 1940 Final	Kilkenny	3–06 – 2–05	Dublin	Nowlan Park, Kilkenny
	J Langton 1–2, J Mulcahy 1–2, J Phelan 1–0, S O'Brien 0–1, M Gargan 0–1.		M McSweeney 1–0, M Brophy 1–0, C Downes 0–1, H Gray 0–1, M Maher 0–1, J Byrne 0–1, N Wade 0–1.	Referee: J Flaherty (Offaly)

=== Munster Senior Hurling Championship ===
Quarter-final

2 June 1940 Quarter-final	Tipperary	2–06 – 6–03	Cork	Thurles Sportsfield, Thurles
	J Looby 2–0, J Cooney 0–2, J Maher 0–1, T Mason 0–1, P Flanagan 0–1, T Doyle 0–1.		T O'Sullivan 2–0, D Moylan 1–1, J Barrett 1–0, W Campbell 1–0, M Brennan 1–0, J Quirke 0–2.	Referee: J Roche (Limerick)

Semi-finals

16 June 1940 Semi-final	Limerick	4–02 – 3–05	Waterford	FitzGerald Stadium, Killarney
	P McMahon 1–0, J Power 1–0, D Stokes 1–0, J Mackey 1–0, M Mackey 0–1, P Clohessy 0–1.		Greene 2–0, Wyse 1–0, C Moylan 0–3, M Hickey 0–2.

7 July 1940 Semi-final	Cork	7–06 – 3–05	Clare	Gaelic Grounds, Limerick
	T O'Sullivan 4–0, J Lynch 1–4, B Dineen 1–0, D Moylan 1–0, M Brennan 0–1, C Ring 0–1.		Halloran 0–4, Flynn 1–0, P Loughnane 1–0, P Moloney 1–0, O'Grady 0–1.

14 July 1940 Semi-final replay	Limerick	3–05 – 3–03	Waterford	Clonmel Sportsfield, Clonmel
	J Roche 2–0, J Power 1–2, M Mackey 0–2, T Ryan 0–1.		W Barron 1–1, D Goode 1–0, S Wyse 1–0, J Rheinish 0–1, T Greaney 0–1.	Referee: S Bourke (Clare)

Final

28 July 1940 Final	Limerick	4–03 – 3–06	Cork	Thurles Sportsfield, Thurles
	P McMahon 3–0, J Mackey 1–0, D Stokes 0–2, J Roche 0–1.		J Quirke 1–2, T O'Sullivan 1–0, J Young 1–0, C Ring 0–2, C Buckley 0–1, W Campbell 0–1.	Referee: D Ryan (Kerry)

4 August 1940 Final replay	Limerick	3–03 – 2–04	Cork	Thurles Sportsfield, Thurles
	P McMahon 2–0, D Stoke 1–0, M Mackey 0–2, J Mackey 0–1,		J Lynch 1–1, T O'SUllivan 1–0, J Quirke 0–2, C Ring 0–1.	Referee: D Ryan (Kerry)

== All-Ireland Senior Hurling Championship ==
Semi-final

11 August 1940 Semi-final	Limerick	3–06 – 0–05	Galway	Cusack Park, Ennis
	M Mackey 1–3, P McMahon 1–2, N Chawke 1–1.		C Boyle 0–2, MJ Flaherty 0–2, M Loughnane 0–1.	Referee: J Regan (Cork)

Final

1 September 1940 Final	Limerick	3–07 – 1–07	Kilkenny	Croke Park, Dublin
	J Power 1–2, D Stokes 1–0, J Mackey 1–0, M Mackey 0–3, P Clohessy 0–1, T Ryan 0–1,		T Leahy 1–1, J Langton 0–2, J Phelan 0–1, J Mulcahy 0–1, J Walsh 0–1, S O'Brien 0–1.	Referee: JJ Callanan (Tipperary)

== Championship statistics ==
=== Top scorers ===
Overall

Rank	Player	County	Tally	Total	Matches	Average
1	Paddy McMahon	Limerick	7-02	23	6	3.83
2	Ted O'Sullivan	Cork	7-00	21	3	7.00
3	Mick Mackey	Limerick	1–11	14	6	2.33
4	Jackie Power	Limerick	3-04	13	6	2.16
5	Jim Langton	Kilkenny	2-06	12	3	4.00

== Sources ==
- Corry, Eoghan, The GAA Book of Lists (Hodder Headline Ireland, 2005).
- Donegan, Des, The Complete Handbook of Gaelic Games (DBA Publications Limited, 2005).
