= Eddie Murphy (hurler) =

Irish hurler and coach

Personal information
- Native name: Eddie Ó Murchú (Irish)
- Born: County Cork

Sport
- Sport: Hurling
- Position: Half-forward
Clubs
- Years: Club
- 1980s–1990s: Bishopstown; Austin Stacks; Kerins O Rahillys
Inter-county
- Years: County
- 1980s–1990s: Kerry

Eddie Murphy is a hurling coach and former player from County Cork. He played with Bishopstown before joining Kerry side Kerins O Rahillys and later Austin Stacks. He won an All Ireland B medal with Kerry in 1986. He also played minor football and hurling with Cork. He later became a hurling coach, and trained Kerry at several levels as well as a number of clubs sides in both Kerry and Cork. He is a son of the Cork All-Ireland-winner Willie 'Long Puck' Murphy.
