= Paddy Phelan =

Irish hurler (1910–1971)

Personal information
- Native name: Pádraig Ó Faoláin (Irish)
- Born: 16 September 1910 Freshford, County Kilkenny, Ireland
- Died: 7 December 1971 (aged 61) Coventry, England

Sport
- Sport: Hurling
- Position: Left wing-back
Club
- Years: Club
- Tullaroan
Club titles
- Kilkenny titles: 3
Inter-county*
Years	County	Apps (scores)
1931–1942	Kilkenny	42 (0-00)
Inter-county titles
- Leinster titles: 8
- All-Irelands: 4
- NHL: 1
- *Inter County team apps and scores correct as of 23:15, 1 July 2013.

Patrick Phelan (16 September 1910 – 7 December 1971) was an Irish hurler who played as a left wing-back for the Kilkenny senior team.

Born in Freshford, County Kilkenny, Phelan arrived on the inter-county scene at the age of twenty-one when he first linked up with the Kilkenny senior team. He made his debut in the 1931 championship. Phelan went on to play a key part for more than a decade, and won four All-Ireland medals, eight Leinster medals and one National Hurling League medal. Phelan was an All-Ireland runner-up on four occasions.

Phelan represented the Leinster inter-provincial team for a remarkable thirteen years, winning four Railway Cup medals in 1932, 1933, 1936 and 1941. At club level, he won three championship medals with Tullaroan.

Throughout his career, Phelan made 42 championship appearances for Kilkenny. His retirement came following Kilkenny's defeat in the 1942 championship.

His grandnephew, D. J. Carey, was a five-time All-Ireland medallist with Kilkenny.

Phelan has been repeatedly voted onto teams made up of the sport's greats, including as wing-back on the Hurling Team of the Century in 1984 and the Hurling Team of the Millennium in 2000.

== Playing career ==
=== Club ===
Phelan played his club hurling with Tullaroan and enjoyed much success during a lengthy career.

In 1930 he lined out in his first championship decider, as Tullaroan fought back after a period of decline. A 4–4 to 0–3 trouncing of senior hurling novices Urlingford gave Phelan a first championship medal.

Tullaroan surrendered their championship crown the following year, but returned to the decider again in 1933. A high-scoring 6–5 to 5–4 defeat of Carrickshock gave Phelan a second championship medal.

Carrickshock stood in the way of a second successive championship for Tullaroan in 1934, however, they proved no match. A 6–6 to 1–5 victory gave Phelan his third and final championship medal.

=== Inter-county ===
Phelan made his senior inter-county debut for Kilkenny in the early stages of the 1931 championship. After a shock defeat by Laois in 1930, both sides met in the provincial decider the following year. A 4–7 to 4–2 victory gave Phelan his first Leinster medal. 6 September 1931 saw Kilkenny face Cork in the All-Ireland final for the first time in five years. The first half was closely contested, with a goal from Mick Ahern helping Cork to a half-time lead of 1–3 to 0–2. Cork stretched the advantage to six points in the second half, but Kilkenny came storming back with a goal and then four points on the trot to take the lead by one point. In the dying moments Eudie Coughlan got possession and made his way towards the goal. As he did so he slipped and fell but struck the sliotar while he was down on his knees, and it went over the bar for the equalising point. A 1–6 apiece draw was the result. 11 October 1931 was the date of the replay and proved to be just as exciting a contest as the first game. A winner still couldn't be found and both sides finished level again at 2–5 apiece. After this game officials pressed for extra time, however, Cork captain Eudie Coughlan rejected this. It was also suggested at a meeting of Council that both teams be declared joint champions and that half an All-Ireland medal be given to each player. This motion was later defeated. As the All-Ireland saga went to a third meeting on 1 November 1931, Kilkenny's inspirational captain Lory Meagher was ruled out of the game because of broken ribs sustained in the first replay. Such was the esteem in which he was held the game was virtually conceded to Cork. Despite fielding a younger team, Kilkenny were defeated by Cork on a score line of 5–8 to 3–4.

Kilkenny retained their provincial crown in 1932, with Phelan adding a second Leinster medal to his collection following a 4–6 to 3–5 defeat of Dublin. The All-Ireland final on 4 September 1932 saw Clare provide the opposition for the first time in almost twenty years. In a low-scoring game, Clare's Tull Considine scored two goals and was foiled for what would almost certainly have been a third. These goals were negated by Kilkenny's three goal-scoring heroes Matty Power, Martin White and Lory Meagher, who scored a remarkable goal from a line ball. The final score of 3–3 to 2–3 gave victory to Kilkenny and gave Phelan an All-Ireland medal.

1933 saw Phelan add a National Hurling League medal to his collection following a 3–8 to 1–3 defeat of Limerick. He later won a third successive Leinster medal following a stunning comeback against Dublin and a 7–5 to 2–5 victory. The All-Ireland final on 3 September 1933 saw a record crowd of 45,176 travel to Croke Park to see Kilkenny face and up-and-coming Limerick. After being level at the interval, the game remained close in the second half until a solo-run goal by Johnny Dunne sealed a 1–7 to 0–6 victory. It was Phelan's second consecutive All-Ireland medal.

After surrendering their provincial crown to Dublin in 1934, Kilkenny faced Laois in the decider again the following year. A 3–8 to 0–6 victory gave Phelan a fourth Leinster medal. Another record crowd gathered at Croke Park for the All-Ireland final between Kilkenny and Limerick on 1 September 1935. Despite rain falling throughout the entire game both sides served up a classic. At the beginning of the second-half Lory Meagher sent over a huge point from midfield giving Kilkenny a lead which they wouldn't surrender. A narrow 2–5 to 2–4 victory gave Phelan a third All-Ireland medal.

Kilkenny dominated the provincial series again in 1936 and Phelan won his fifth Leinster medal following a 4–6 to 2–5 defeat of Laois. The lure of a Kilkenny-Limerick clash brought a record crowd of over 50,000 to Croke Park for the All-Ireland decider on 6 September 1936. The first half produced a game that lived up to the previous clashes, and Limerick had a two-point advantage at half-time. In the second half, Limerick took over and Phelan's side were completely outclassed on a 5–6 to 1–5 score line.

Kilkenny had been in decline for a number of seasons, however, a 5–3 to 2–4 defeat of provincial final debutantes Westmeath game Phelan his sixth Leinster medal. The subsequent All-Ireland final against Tipperary took place at Fitzgerald Stadium, Killarney on 5 September 1937. Tipp gave a tour de force performance and recorded a 3–11 to 0–3 victory in one of the most one-sided championship deciders ever.

After surrendering their provincial crown to Dublin in 1938, Kilkenny bounced back the following year. A 2–12 to 4–3 victory gave Phelan a seventh Leinster medal. The subsequent All-Ireland final pitted Kilkenny against Cork. In one of the most iconic championship deciders of all-time, played on the day that World War II broke out, the climax of the game was played in a ferocious thunderstorm. While a draw looked likely as the hour drew to a close, Phelan sent a seventy-yard free in towards the Cork goalmouth. The sliotar was gobbled up by the defence and cleared, but only as far as Jimmy Kelly who sent it straight over the bar for a one-point lead. Immediately after the puck-out the referee blew the whistle and Kilkenny were victorious on a score line of 2–7 to 3–3. The win gave Phelan a fourth All-Ireland medal.

Phelan secured an eighth Leinster medal in 1940, as Kilkenny retained their provincial crown following a 3–6 to 2–5 defeat of Dublin. The subsequent All-Ireland decider on 1 September 1940 brought Kilkenny and Limerick together for the last great game between the two outstanding teams of the decade. Early in the second half Kilkenny took a four-point lead, however, once Mick Mackey was deployed at midfield he proceeded to dominate the game. Limerick hung on to win the game on a score line of 3–7 to 1–7.

In 1941 and 1942 Phelan was denied a ninth Leinster medal as Dublin defeated Kilkenny in back-to-back provincial deciders. He retired from inter-county hurling following the latter defeat.

=== Inter-provincial ===
Phelan also had the honour of lining out with Leinster in the inter-provincial series of games.

His inter-provincial hurling career had something of an unorthodox beginning as he had never played inter-county hurling when he made his Leinster debut. On the day of the 1930 decider, the provincial selectors were left shorthanded by some last minute defections and were short a goalkeeper. Phelan was persuaded to play in goal, however, Munster triumphed by 4–6 to 2–7.

In 1932 Phelan won his first Railway Cup medal following a 6–8 to 4–4 defeat of Munster. The province made it two in a row the following year, and a 4–6 to 3–6 defeat of Munster gave Phelan a second Railway Cup medal.

Munster secured their own two-in-a-row over the next few seasons, however, Leinster bounced back in 1936. A 2–8 to 3–4 defeat of old rivals Munster gave Phelan a third Railway Cup medal.

In 1941 Leinster foiled Munster's bid for five successive titles. A narrow 2–5 to 2–4 victory gave Phelan a fourth Railway Cup medal.

== Recognition ==
Phelan was recognised a number of times as one of the greatest players of all-time. For example, more than a decade after his death, Phelan was recognised during the Gaelic Athletic Association's centenary year in 1984 when he was chosen at left wing-back on the Hurling Team of the Century. In 1988 he was chosen on a special Tullaroan team to celebrate the centenary of the club's foundation. Phelan was later named at right wing-back on the Hurling Team of the Millennium in 2000, while he was also named in the left wing-back position on a special Kilkenny Team of the Century.

== Honours ==
=== Team ===
Tullaroan

- Kilkenny Senior Hurling Championship (3): 1930, 1933, 1934

Kilkenny

- All-Ireland Senior Hurling Championship (4): 1932, 1933, 1935, 1939
- Leinster Senior Hurling Championship (8): 1931, 1932, 1933, 1935 (c), 1936, 1937, 1939, 1940
- National Hurling League (1): 1932–33

Leinster

- Railway Cup (4): 1932, 1933, 1936, 1941

=== Individual ===
Honours

- Hurling Team of the Millennium: Right wing-back
- Hurling Team of the Century: Left wing-back
- Kilkenny Team of the Century: Left wing-back
- Tullaroan Team of the Century: Left wing-back
- GAA Hall of Fame Inductee: 2013
