= Billy Burke (hurler) =

Irish hurler

Personal information
- Native name: Liam de Búrca (Irish)
- Born: 1912 Tullaroan, County Kilkenny, Ireland
- Occupation: Ambulance controller
- Height: 5 ft 9 in (175 cm)

Sport
- Sport: Hurling
- Position: Centre-back
Clubs
- Years: Club
- Tullaroan; Dicksboro; Éire Óg
Club titles
- Kilkenny titles: 0
Inter-county
- Years: County
- 1934-1945: Kilkenny
Inter-county titles
- Leinster titles: 4
- All-Irelands: 2
- NHL: 0

William Burke (1912 – 23 January 1995) was an Irish hurler who played as a centre-back for the Kilkenny senior team.

Burke made his first appearance for the team during the 1934 championship and became a regular player over the next decade. During that time he won one All-Ireland winner's medal and four Leinster winner's medals.

At club level Burke played with the Tullaroan club.
