= Danny McAllister (hurler) =

Irish hurler

Personal information
- Born: Glenariff, County Antrim

Sport
- Sport: Hurling
- Position: Forward
Club
- Years: Club
- Glenariff
Inter-county
- Years: County
- 1940s–1950s: Antrim
Inter-county titles
- Ulster titles: 7
- All-Irelands: 0

Danny McAllister (1919–2008) was an Irish sportsperson. He played hurling with his local club Glenariff and with the Antrim senior inter-county team in the 1940s and 1950s. He played full forward in the 1943 All Ireland hurling final against Cork - the first of only two occasions that Antrim reached the All Ireland final.
