= 1941 All-Ireland Senior Hurling Championship final =

1941 All-Ireland Senior Hurling Final
- Event: 1941 All-Ireland Senior Hurling Championship
Cork	Dublin
5-11	0-6
- Date: 28 September 1941
- Venue: Croke Park, Dublin
- Referee: W. O'Donnell (Tipperary)
- Attendance: 26,150

The 1941 All-Ireland Senior Hurling Championship Final was the 54th All-Ireland Final and the culmination of the 1941 All-Ireland Senior Hurling Championship, an inter-county hurling tournament for the top teams in Ireland. The match was held at Croke Park, Dublin, on 28 September 1941, between Cork and Dublin. The Leinster champions lost to their Munster opponents on a score line of 5–11 to 0–6.

== Match details ==
1942-09-28
15:15 IST

Cork	5-11 – 0-6	Dublin

Croke Park, Dublin
Attendance: 26,150
Referee: W. O'Donnell (Tipperary)

Cork	Dublin

Cork Team 1 Jim Buttimer 2 Willie Murphy 3 Batt Thornhill 4 Alan Lotty 5 Willie Campbell 6 Fr Con Cottrell 7 Din Joe Buckley 8 Jack Barrett 9 Jack Lynch 10 Christy Ring 11 Connie Buckley 12 Jim Young 13 John Quirke 14 Ted O'Sullivan 15 Micka Brennan Substitutes Paddy O'Donovan for Jack Lynch Bobby Ryng for Micka Brennan Substitutes Not Used Tony Slattery, Dan McCarthy, Derry Beckett Trainer Jim Tough Barry Selectors Sean McCarthy, Paddy Fox Collins, Dinny Barry Murphy, Sean Og Murphy, William Bowler Walsh
