= 1938 All-Ireland Senior Hurling Championship =

Championship details
- Dates: 1 May – 4 September 1938
- Teams: 13

All-Ireland champions
- Winning team: Dublin (6th win)
- Captain: Mick Daniels

All-Ireland Finalists
- Losing team: Waterford
- Captain: Mick Hickey

Provincial champions
- Munster: Waterford
- Leinster: Dublin
- Ulster: Not Played
- Connacht: Not Played

Championship statistics
- No. matches played: 13
- Goals total: 66
- Points total: 113
- Top Scorer: Locky Byrne (4–5)
- All-Star Team: See here

The 1938 All-Ireland Senior Hurling Championship was the 52nd staging of the All-Ireland Senior Hurling Championship, the Gaelic Athletic Association's premier inter-county hurling tournament. The championship began on 1 May 1938 and ended on 4 September 1938.

Tipperary were the defending champions but were disqualified from the championship after fielding an ineligible player in their Munster semi-final defeat of Clare.

On 4 September 1938, Dublin won the championship following a 2–5 to 1–6 defeat of Waterford in the All-Ireland final. This was their sixth All-Ireland title, their first in eleven championship seasons. It remains their last All-Ireland triumph.

Waterford's Locky Byrne was the championship's top scorer with 4–5.

== Teams ==
=== Overview ===
The 1938 championship featured no new entrants to the competition. Kerry, a team who had fielded a team throughout much of the 1930s, declined to participate in the Munster Championship.

Galway were the sole representatives from the Conancht Championship and received a bye to the All-Ireland semi-final. There were no representatives from the Ulster Championship.

=== Summaries ===
Team	Colours	Grounds	Most recent success		
Team	Colours	Grounds	All-Ireland	Provincial	League
Clare	Saffron and blue	Cusack Park	1914	1932	
Cork	Red and white	Cork Athletic Grounds	1931	1931	1929–30
Dublin	Blue and navy	Croke Park	1927	1934	1928–29
Galway	Maroon and white	Pearse Stadium	1923		
Kilkenny	Black and amber	Nowlan Park	1935	1937	1932–33
Laois	Blue and white	O'Moore Park	1915	1915	
Limerick	Green and white	Ennis Road	1936	1936	1937–38
Meath	Green and gold	Páirc Tailteann			
Offaly	Green, white and gold	St. Brendan's Park			
Tipperary	Blue and gold	Thurles Sportsfield	1937	1937	1927–28
Waterford	White and blue	Walsh Park			
Westmeath	Maroon and white	Cusack Park			
Wexford	Purple and gold	Wexford Park	1910	1918	

== Results ==
=== Leinster Senior Hurling Championship ===
Quarter-final

1 May 1938 Quarter-final	Dublin	7–1 – 3–7	Wexford	Aughrim Park, Aughrim

8 May 1938 Quarter-final	Westmeath	5–4 – 4–2	Meath	Cusack Park, Mullingar

15 May 1938 Quarter-final	Offaly	2–2 – 1–6	Laois	St. Brendan's Park, Birr

Semi-finals

Semi-final	Dublin	3–6 – 3–1	Westmeath

26 June 1938 Semi-final	Laois	1–2 – 5–7	Kilkenny	O'Moore Park, Portlaoise

Finals

17 July 1938 Final	Dublin	2–3 – 2–3	Kilkenny	O'Moore Park, Portlaoise
	R Ryan 1–1, J Byrne 1–0, J Gray 0–2.		J Walsh 1–0, M White 1–0, D Maher 1–0, J Mulcahy 0–1, J Phelan 0–1.

The Leinster final ended in a draw for the first time since 1934.

31 July 1938 Final replay	Dublin	4–9 – 3–5	Kilkenny	O'Connor Park, Tullamore
	M McDonnell 0–7, M Brophy 2–0, J Gray 1–1, J Byrne 1–1.		D Maher 1–1, J Mulcahy 1–0, T Leahy 1–0, J Phelan 0–3, J Langton 0–1.

=== Munster Senior Hurling Championship ===
Quarter-final

22 May 1938 Quarter-final	Cork	5–04 – 2–05	Limerick	Thurles Sportsfield, Thurles
	J Kelly 1–1, C Buckley 1–1, F Barry 1–0, M Brennan 1–0, D Moylan 1–0, J Lynch 0–2.		Givens 1–0, J McCarthy 1–1, M Mackey 0–3, T Ryan 0–1.

Semi-finals

26 June 1938 Semi-final	Tipperary	3–10 – 2–03	Clare	Ennis Road, Limerick
	J Coffey 2–2, N Wade 1–2, J Cooney 0–1, P Ryan 0–1, T Doyle 0–1, Burke 0–1, Barry 0–1, B O'Donnell 0–1.		Hennessy 1–0, Murphy 1–0, C Flanagan 0–2, O'Halloran 0–1.	Referee: J O'Regan (Cork)

Clare later objected to the victory as Tipperary had fielded Jimmy Cooney who was suspended. The objection was upheld and Clare were later awarded the game.

10 July 1938 Semi-final	Waterford	5–02 – 1–03	Cork	Fraher Field, Dungarvan
	PA Sheehan 2–0, L Byrne 2–0, D Goode 1–0, T Greaney 0–1, S Feeney 0–1.		M Brennan 1–0, F Barry 0–1, J Young 0–1, J Barrett 0–1.

Final

31 July 1938 Final	Waterford	3–05 – 2-05	Clare	Cork Athletic Grounds, Cork
	L Byrne 1–0, J Butler 1–0, J Halpin 1–0, J Feeney 0–2, C Moylan 0–2, T Greaney 0–1.		Hennessy 1–1, P Loughnane 1–0, S Guinnane 0–2, M Murphy 0–2.	Referee: J O'Regan (Cork)

Waterford won the Munster title for the first time in their history.

=== All-Ireland Senior Hurling Championship ===
Semi-final

7 August 1938 Semi-final	Waterford	4–8 – 3–1	Galway	Cusack Park, Ennis

Waterford's first championship match against Galway

Final

4 September 1938 Final	Dublin	2–5 – 1–6	Waterford	Croke Park, Dublin
	M Flynn 1–0, W Loughman 1–0, M McDonnell 0–3, H Gray 0–1, P Doody 0–1.		J Keane 0–4, D Goode 1–0, L Byrne 0–2.	Attendance: 37,129; Referee: I Harney (Galway)

Waterford's first All-Ireland final and first championship match against Dublin
