= Paddy McMahon (hurler) =

Irish hurler

Patrick McMahon (6 December 1911 – 1 January 1987) was an Irish hurler. At club level he played for Kildimo and Ahane, winning several Limerick Senior Championship medals, and was full-forward on the Limerick senior hurling team that won the All-Ireland Championship in 1936 and 1940.
