= Jimmy Kelly (Carrickshock hurler) =

Irish hurler, born 1916

Personal information
- Native name: Séamus Ó Ceallaigh (Irish)
- Born: February 3, 1915 Kilcready, County Kilkenny, Ireland
- Died: 3 April 1985 (aged 69–70) Kilmoganny, County Kilkenny, Ireland
- Occupation: Rate Collector
- Height: 5 ft 11 in (180 cm)

Sport
- Sport: Hurling
- Position: Midfield
Club
- Years: Club
- Carrickshock
Club titles
- Kilkenny titles: 6
Inter-county
- Years: County
- 1938–1949: Kilkenny
Inter-county titles
- Leinster titles: 6
- All-Irelands: 2
- NHL: 0

James Kelly (3 February 1915 – 3 April 1985) was an Irish hurler who played as a midfielder for the Kilkenny senior team.

Born in Kilcready, Castlebanny, County Kilkenny, County Kilkenny, Kelly first arrived on the inter-county scene when he first linked up with the Kilkenny senior team. He made his debut in the 1938 championship and immediately became a regular member of the team. During his career he won two All-Ireland medals and six Leinster medals. He was an All-Ireland runner-up on three occasions.

Kelly also represented the Leinster inter-provincial team on a number of occasions, winning one Railway Cup medal. At club level he won six championship medals with Carrickshock.

His retirement came following Kilkenny's defeat by Laois in the 1949 championship.

== Honours ==
=== Team ===
Carrickshock

- Kilkenny Senior Hurling Championship (6): 1938 1940 1941 1942 1943 1951

Kilkenny

- All-Ireland Senior Hurling Championship (2): 1939, 1947
- Leinster Senior Hurling Championship (6): 1939, 1940, 1943, 1945, 1946, 1947

Leinster

- Railway Cup (1): 1941
