= 1943 Cork Senior Hurling Championship =

Annual hurling competition season

- Dates: 4 April 1943 – 7 November 1943
- Teams: 9
- Champions: St. Finbarr's (12th title)
- Runners-up: Ballincollig

Tournament statistics
- Matches played: 9
- Goals scored: 67 (7.44 per match)
- Points scored: 75 (8.33 per match)

The 1943 Cork Senior Hurling Championship was the 55th staging of the Cork Senior Hurling Championship since its establishment by the Cork County Board in 1887. The draw for the opening round fixtures took place at the Cork Convention on 31 January 1943. The championship began on 4 April 1943 and ended on 7 November 1943.

St. Finbarr's were the defending champions.

On 7 November 1943, St. Finbarr's won the championship following a 7–09 to 1–01 defeat of Ballincollig in a replay of the final. This was their 12th championship title overall and their second title in succession.

== Results ==
=== First round ===
4 April 1943 First round	Carrigdhoun	6-03 - 2-03	Cloughduv	The Mardyke, Cork

11 April 1944 First round	Imokilly	3-01 - 4-05	University College Cork	Riverstown Sportsfield, Sallybrook

2 May 1943 First round	Ballincollig	4-04 - 1-09	Blackrock	The Mardyke, Cork

16 May 1943 First round	Sarsfields	3-03 - 4-02	Glen Rovers	Cork Athletic Grounds, Cork

- St. Finbarr's received a bye in this round.

=== Second round ===
30 May 1943 Second round	St. Finbarr's	5-10 - 2-02	Carrigdhoun	The Mardyke, Cork

- Ballincollig, Glen Rovers and University College Cork received byes in this round.

=== Semi-finals ===
18 July 1943 Semi-final	University College Cork	4-01 - 7-02	Ballincollig	The Mardyke, Cork

19 September 1943 Semi-final	St. Finbarr's	4-11 - 4-03	Glen Rovers	Cork Athletic Grounds, Cork
	S Condon 1-3, J O'Sullivan 1-1, T O'Sullivan 1-1, D McCarthy 1-1, W Beckett 0-2, W Campbell 0-2, T O'Halloran 0-1.		C Ring 1-1, D Moylan 1-1, J Buckley 1-0, J Kenny 1-0, J Lynch 0-1.	Referee: T Greaney (Mitchelstown)

=== Finals ===
10 October 1943 Final	St. Finbarr's	3-03 - 3-03	Ballincollig	Cork Athletic Grounds, Cork

7 November 1943 Final replay	St. Finbarr's	7-09 - 1-01	Ballincollig	Cork Athletic Grounds, Cork

== Championship statistics ==
=== Miscellaneous ===
- The semi-final between St. Finbarr's and Glen Rovers had a record attendance of 18,410.
- Ballincollig become the first team to lose three finals in a row.
