= 1936 All-Ireland Minor Hurling Championship =

All-Ireland Minor Hurling Championship 1936
All Ireland Champions
- Winners: Kilkenny (3rd win)

All Ireland Runners-up
- Runners-up: Cork

Provincial Champions
- Munster: Cork
- Leinster: Kilkenny
- Ulster: Antrim
- Connacht: Galway

The 1936 All-Ireland Minor Hurling Championship was the ninth staging of the All-Ireland Minor Hurling Championship since its establishment by the Gaelic Athletic Association in 1928.

Kilkenny entered the championship as the defending champions.

On 6 September 1936 Kilkenny won the championship following a 2-4 to 2-3 defeat of Cork in the All-Ireland final. This was their second All-Ireland in-a-row.

== Results ==
=== All-Ireland Minor Hurling Championship ===
Semi-final

| 16 August 1936 Semi-final | Cork | 4-06 - 1-03 | Galway | St. Cronan's Park, Roscrea |

| 23 August 1936 Semi-final | Kilkenny | 9-09 - 1-02 | Antrim | Croke Park, Dublin |

Final

| 6 September 1936 Final | Kilkenny | 2-04 - 2-03 | Cork | Croke Park, Dublin |

== Championship statistics ==
=== Miscellaneous ===
- Kilkenny became the second team after Tipperary to retain the All-Ireland Championship title.
