= 1935 All-Ireland Minor Hurling Championship =

All-Ireland Minor Hurling Championship 1935
All Ireland Champions
- Winners: Kilkenny (2nd win)

All Ireland Runners-up
- Runners-up: Tipperary

Provincial Champions
- Munster: Tipperary
- Leinster: Kilkenny
- Ulster: Antrim
- Connacht: Galway

The 1935 All-Ireland Minor Hurling Championship was the eighth staging of the All-Ireland Minor Hurling Championship since its establishment by the Gaelic Athletic Association in 1928.

Tipperary entered the championship as the defending champions in search of a fourth successive title.

On 1 September 1935 Kilkenny won the championship following a 4–2 to 3–3 defeat of Tipperary in the All-Ireland final. This was their second All-Ireland and their first in four championship seasons.

== Results ==
=== All-Ireland Minor Hurling Championship ===
Semi-finals

4 August 1935 Semi-final	Kilkenny	11-07 - 2-02	Galway	St. Brendan's Park, Birr

18 August 1935 Semi-final	Tipperary	6-07 - 0-00	Antrim	Croke Park, Dublin

Final

1 September 1935 Final	Kilkenny	4-02 - 3-03	Tipperary	Croke Park, Dublin

== Championship statistics ==
=== Miscellaneous ===
- Kilkenny became the second team to win more than one All-Ireland title.
