= 1932 All-Ireland Senior Hurling Championship =

Championship details
- Dates: 1 May – 4 September 1932
- Teams: 12

All-Ireland champions
- Winning team: Kilkenny (9th win)
- Captain: Jimmy Walsh

All-Ireland Finalists
- Losing team: Clare
- Captain: John Joe Doyle
- Manager: Amby Power

Provincial champions
- Munster: Clare
- Leinster: Kilkenny
- Ulster: Donegal
- Connacht: Not Played

Championship statistics
- No. matches played: 12
- Goals total: 90 (7.50 per game)
- Points total: 112 (9.33 per game)
- Top Scorer: Tull Considine (12–2)
- All-Star Team: See here

The 1931 All-Ireland Senior Hurling Championship was the 46th staging of the All-Ireland hurling championship since its establishment by the Gaelic Athletic Association in 1887. The championship began on 1 May 1932 and ended on 4 September 1932.

Cork were the defending champions, however, they were defeated in the provincial series of games. Kilkenny won the title following a 3–3 to 2–3 victory over Clare in the final.

== Teams ==
A total of twelve teams contested the championship, the same number of participants from the previous championship. There were no new entrants.

=== Team summaries ===
Team	Colours	Most recent success		
Team	Colours	All-Ireland	Provincial	League
Clare	Saffron and blue	1914	1914	
Cork	Red and white	1931	1931	1929–30
Dublin	Blue and navy	1927	1930	1928–29
Galway	Maroon and white	1923		1930–31
Kilkenny	Black and amber	1922	1931	
Laois	Blue and white	1915	1915	
Limerick	Green and white	1921	1923	
Meath	Green and gold			
Offaly	Green, white and gold			
Tipperary	Blue and gold	1930	1930	1927–28
Waterford	White and blue			
Wexford	Purple and gold	1910	1918	

== Results ==
=== Leinster Senior Hurling Championship ===
1 May 1932 Quarter-final	Meath	0–2 – 4–6	Kilkenny	Páirc Tailteann
				Referee: W Allen

8 May 1932 Quarter final	Offaly	5–2 – 6–8	Laois	St. Brendan's Park
				Referee: S O'Neill

8 May 1932 Semi-final	Wexford	2–5 – 4–2	Dublin	St. Patrick's Park
				Referee: J Roberts

12 June 1932 Semi-final	Laois	2–5 – 4–12	Kilkenny	O'Moore Park
				Attendance: 12,000; Referee: S Robbins (Offaly)

24 July 1932 Final	Kilkenny	4–6 – 3–5	Dublin	O'Moore Park
	Martin Power 1–2, D Dunne 1–2, Matty Power 1–0, J Fitzpatrick 1–0, J Walsh 0–2.		J Leeson 1–1, T Quinlan 1–1, D Maher 1–0, M Daniels 0–1, S Hegarty 0–1, N Wade 0–1.	Referee: S Robbins (Offaly)

=== Munster Senior Hurling Championship ===
29 May 1932 Quarter-final	Limerick	4–2 – 1–5	Tipperary	Cork Athletic Grounds
				Referee: S Óg Murphy (Cork)

12 June 1932 Quarter-final	Waterford	1–5 – 5–6	Cork	Fraher Field
				Attendance: 15,000; Referee: T Keating

3 July 1932 Semi-final	Clare	8–3 – 2–2	Kerry	Gaelic Grounds

17 July 1932 Semi-final	Cork	5–4 – 3–5	Limerick	Thurles Sportsfield
				Attendance: 20,000; Referee: T Considine

31 July 1932 Final	Clare	5–2 – 4–1	Cork	Thurles Sportsfield
	T Considine 3–1, J Houlihan 1–1, M O'Rourke 1–0.		M Ahern 1–0, J Hurley 1–0, J Quirke 1–0, DB Murphy 1–0, W Clancy 0–1.	Attendance: 25,000; Referee: W Gleeson (Tipperary)

=== All-Ireland Senior Hurling Championship ===
14 August 1932 Semi-final	Clare	9–4 – 4–14	Galway	Gaelic Grounds
				Attendance: 25,000; Referee: J Flaherty

4 September 1932 Final	Kilkenny	3–3 – 2–3	Clare	Croke Park
				Attendance: 34,392; Referee: S Robbins (Offaly)

== Championship statistics ==
=== Scoring ===
- Widest winning margin: 19 points
  - Clare 8–3 – 2–2 Kerry (Munster semi-final, 3 July 1932)
- Most goals in a match: 10
  - Clare 9–4 – 4–14 Galway (All-Ireland semi-final, 14 August 1932)
- Most points in a match: 23
  - Clare 9–4 – 4–14 Galway (All-Ireland semi-final, 14 August 1932)
- Most goals by one team in a match: 9
  - Clare 9–4 – 4–14 Galway (All-Ireland semi-final, 14 August 1932)
- Most goals scored by a losing team: 5
  - Offaly 5–2 – 6–8 Laois (Leinster quarter-final, 8 May 1932)
- Most points scored by a losing team: 6
  - Galway 4–14 – 9–4 Clare (All-Ireland semi-final, 14 August 1932)

=== Miscellaneous ===
- The Munster quarter-final clash of Cork and Waterford and the Munster semi-final clash of Clare and Kerry, both scheduled for 5 June 1932, are postponed.
- Clare win the Munster title for the first time since 1914.
- Clare overcame a halftime deficit of 13 points in the All Ireland semifinal against Galway (2-00 4-07) by scoring 7–04 in the second half to Galway's 0-07. It remains (July 2022) the largest halftime deficit clawed back in an All Ireland semifinal.
- There are a number of first-ever meetings. The All-Ireland semi-final between Clare and Galway is their first ever championship clash, while Clare and Kilkenny meet for the first time in the subsequent All-Ireland final.

== Sources ==
- Corry, Eoghan, The GAA Book of Lists (Hodder Headline Ireland, 2005).
- Donegan, Des, The Complete Handbook of Gaelic Games (DBA Publications Limited, 2005).
