= 1930–31 National Hurling League =

Fifth season of the National Hurling League

League details
- Dates: 1 March 1931 – 29 November 1931
- Teams: 12

League champions
- Winners: Galway (1st win)
- Captain: Ignatius Harney

League runners-up
- Runners-up: Tipperary
- Captain: Martin Kennedy

The 1930–31 National Hurling League was the fifth edition of the National Hurling League, which ran from 1 March 1931 to 29 November 1931.

The twelve participating teams were Antrim, Clare, Cork, Dublin, Galway, Kilkenny, Laois, Meath, Offaly, Tipperary, Waterford and Wexford, who were divided into three different divisions. Each team played each of their rivals once with two points awarded for a win and one point awarded for a drawn game.

Galway defeated Tipperary by 4–5 to 4–4 in the final, achieving their first win.

== National Hurling League ==
=== Results ===
29 November 1931 Final	Galway	4–5 – 4–4	Tipperary	Portumna
		Report		Attendance: 5,000; Referee: T Considine
