= 1915 All-Ireland Senior Hurling Championship =

Championship details
- Dates: 25 April 1915 – 24 October 1915
- Teams: 17

All-Ireland champions
- Winning team: Laois (1st win)
- Captain: Jack Finlay

All-Ireland Finalists
- Losing team: Cork
- Captain: Connie Sheehan

Provincial champions
- Munster: Cork
- Leinster: Laois
- Ulster: Monaghan
- Connacht: Galway

Championship statistics
- No. matches played: 15
- Goals total: 96 (6.4 per game)
- Points total: 81 (5.4 per game)
- All-Star Team: See here

The 1915 All-Ireland Senior Hurling Championship was the 29th staging of the All-Ireland hurling championship since its establishment by the Gaelic Athletic Association in 1887. The championship began on 25 April 1915 and ended on 24 October 1915.

Clare were the defending champions, however, they were defeated in the provincial series. Laois won the championship after defeating Cork by 6–2 to 4–1 in the final.

== Teams ==
A total of seventeen teams contested the championship.

== Results ==
=== Leinster Senior Hurling Championship ===
9 May 1915 First round	Wicklow	4–7 to 2–1	Carlow	Jones's Road

6 June 1915 Semi-final	Laois	4–1 to 2–6	Kilkenny	Tullamore Sportsfield
				Attendance: 4,000; Referee: J Quigley

27 June 1915 First round	Dublin	2–3 to 4–3	Laois	Tullow

11 July 1915 Quarter-final	Wexford	3–5 to 4–3	Dublin	New Ross
				Attendance: 4,000; Referee: P Dunphy

25 July 1915 Semi-final	Dublin	7–2 to 3–2	Offaly	Portlaoise Sportsfield

15 August 1915 Final	Laois	3–2 to 0–5	Dublin	Kilkenny Sportsfield
				Attendance: 6,000; Referee: J Lalor

=== Munster Senior Hurling Championship ===
25 April 1915 Quarter-final	Kerry	2–4 to 3–9	Limerick	Tralee Sportsfield

13 June 1915 Semi-final	Clare	10–4 to 2–1	Waterford

20 June 1915 Quarter-final	Cork	4–00 to 3–1	Tipperary	Fraher Field

18 July 1915 Semi-final	Cork	2–1 to 0–00	Limerick	Thurles Sportsfield
				Attendance: 15,000; Referee: T Ryan

26 September 1915 Final	Cork	8–2 to 2–1	Clare	Markets Field
				Attendance: 12,000; Referee: W Walsh

=== Ulster Senior Hurling Championship ===
20 June 1915 Semi-final	Down	2–5 to 5–1	Antrim	Ardglass

12 September 1915 Final	Monaghan	1–5 to 1–2	Antrim	Clones Sportsfield

=== All-Ireland Senior Hurling Championship ===
8 August 1915 Semi-final	Laois	w/o – scr.	Ulster

8 August 1915 Semi-final	Galway	1–1 to 2–1	Clare	Gort
				Referee: P Dunphy

24 October 1915 Final	Laois	6–2 to 4–1	Cork	Croke Park
				Attendance: 12,000; Referee: W Walsh

== Championship statistics ==
=== Miscellaneous ===
- The Munster semi-final between Cork and Limerick was abandoned with four minutes left in the match. Lloyd's News reported that "betting" was the cause of a dispute.
- Monaghan retain the Ulster title for the only time in their history. It remains their last provincial triumph.
- Due to a delay in the southern province, Clare represented Munster in the All-Ireland semi-final and defeated Galway to qualify for the All-Ireland final. Cork subsequently defeated Clare in the Munster final and claimed their place in the All-Ireland decider.
- The All-Ireland final between Cork and Laois was the first championship meeting between the two sides. Their second championship meeting did not take place until 2011 when Cork were victorious. As a result of this, Laois were the only team that Cork had played but never beaten in the championship.
- Laois become the 10th team to win the All-Ireland crown. It remains their only championship title.

== Sources ==
- Corry, Eoghan, The GAA Book of Lists (Hodder Headline Ireland, 2005).
- Donegan, Des, The Complete Handbook of Gaelic Games (DBA Publications Limited, 2005).
