= 1939 All-Ireland Senior Hurling Championship =

Championship details
- Dates: 7 May – 3 September 1939
- Teams: 13

All-Ireland champions
- Winning team: Kilkenny (12th win)
- Captain: Jimmy Walsh

All-Ireland Finalists
- Losing team: Cork
- Captain: Jack Lynch

Provincial champions
- Munster: Cork
- Leinster: Kilkenny
- Ulster: Not Played
- Connacht: Not Played

Championship statistics
- No. matches played: 12
- Goals total: 91 (7.58 per game)
- Points total: 116 (9.66 per game)
- Top Scorer: Jim Langton (1–20)
- All-Star Team: See here

The 1939 All-Ireland Senior Hurling Championship was the 53rd staging of the All-Ireland Senior Hurling Championship since its establishment by the Gaelic Athletic Association in 1887. The championship began on 7 May 1939 and ended on 3 September 1939.

Dublin entered the championship as the defending champions, however, they were beaten by Kilkenny in the Leinster final.

The All-Ireland final was played on 3 September 1939 at Croke Park in Dublin, between Kilkenny and Cork, in what was their first meeting in a final in nine years. Kilkenny won the match by 2–07 to 3–03 to claim their 12th championship title overall and a first title since 1935. The 1939 All-Ireland final remains one of the most iconic of all time. Played on the day that Britain declared war on Germany, the climax of the match took place during a terrific thunderstorm and earned the sobriquet of the "thunder and lightning final".

Kilkenny's Jim Langton was the championship's top scorer with 1–20.

== Teams ==
A total of thirteen teams contested the championship, including all of the teams from the 1938 championship. Wexford re-entered the championship after a one-year absence.

=== Team summaries ===
| Team | Colours | Most recent success | | |
| Team | Colours | All-Ireland | Provincial | League |
|---|---|---|---|---|
| Clare | Saffron and blue | 1914 | 1932 | |
| Cork | Red and white | 1931 | 1931 | 1929–30 |
| Dublin | Navy and blue | 1938 | 1938 | 1938–39 |
| Galway | Maroon and white | 1923 | 1922 | 1930–31 |
| Kilkenny | Black and amber | 1935 | 1937 | 1932–33 |
| Laois | Blue and white | 1915 | 1915 | |
| Limerick | Green and white | 1936 | 1936 | 1937–38 |
| Meath | Green and gold | | | |
| Offaly | Green, white and gold | | | |
| Tipperary | Blue and gold | 1937 | 1937 | 1927–28 |
| Waterford | Blue and white | | 1938 | |
| Westmeath | Maroon and white | | | |
| Wexford | Purple and gold | 1910 | 1918 | |

== Results ==
=== Leinster Senior Hurling Championship ===
First round

| 7 May 1939 First round | Meath | 6–04 – 1–03 | Westmeath | Páirc Tailteann, Navan |
| | M Falvey 3–1, P Farrell 2–0, M Leonard 1–1, T Donnelly 0–2. | | T McGrath 1–2, J Skehal 0–1. |

| 7 May 1939 First round | Wexford | 4–07 – 1–04 | Offaly | Nowlan Park, Kilkenny |
| | K Whelan 4–0, J Foley 0–4, T Butler 0–3. | | M Dooley 1–0, P Egan 0–2, P Geoghegan 0–1, J Carroll 0–1. |

Second round

| 18 June 1939 Second round | Laois | 12–07 – 4–02 | Meath | O'Connor Park, Tullamore |
| | W Delaney 4–1, P Norton 4–0, T Fitzpatrick 2–2, Nolan 1–0, P Ruschitzko 1–0, P Farrell 0–2, F Jones 0–1, Dunphy 0–1. | | Moran 1–1, Farrell 1–1, McInerney 1–0, Farnan 1–0. |

Wexford received a bye in this round.

Semi-finals

| 18 June 1939 Semi-final | Wexford | 2–03 – 10–07 | Dublin | Wexford Park, Wexford |
| | K Whelan 1–0, J Foley 1–0, A Kealy 0–1, P Boggan 0–1, D Cloney 0–1. | | B Loughnane 3–1, M Brophy 3–0, C Downes 1–3, M McDonald 1–2, P Doody 1–0, P McSweeney 1–0, J Byrne 0–1. |

| 2 July 1939 Semi-final | Kilkenny | 6–09 – 1–05 | Laois | Nowlan Park, Kilkenny |
| | J Kelly 2–0, J Langton 1–3, T Leahy 1–2, S O'Brien 1–0, J Walsh 1–0, P Phelan 0–3, J Mulcahy 0–1. | | W Delaney 1–0, D Walsh 0–2, P Farrell 0–1, T Fitzpatrick 0–1, A Bergin 0–1. |

Final

| 16 July 1939 Final | Kilkenny | 2–12 – 4–03 | Dublin | O'Moore Park, Portlaoise |
| | J Langton 0–6, J Mulcahy 1–1, P Phelan 1–2, T Leahy 0–1, J Walsh 0–1, B Hinks 0–1, | | P McSweeney 3–0, M Brophy 1–0, J McDonald 0–2, H Gray 0–1. |

=== Munster Senior Hurling Championship ===
First round

| 21 May 1939 First round | Tipperary | 2–00 – 3–03 | Limerick | Thurles Sportsfield, Thurles |
| | D Murphy 2–0, | | P MacMahon 2–0, M Hickey 1–0, M Mackey 0–2, T Ryan 0–1. |

Semi-finals

| 25 June 1939 Semi-final | Cork | 7–04 – 4–03 | Waterford | FitzGerald Park, Killarney |
| | T O'Sullivan 3–0, M Brennan 2–0, B Ryng 1–0, D Moylan 1–0, Lynch 0–2, B Dineen 0–1, W Campbell 0–1. | | J Keane 1–0, L Byrne 1–0, D Goode 1–0, N Hardy 1–0, Moynihan 0–2, A Fleming 0–1. |

| 9 July 1939 Semi-final | Limerick | 5–05 – 1–01 | Clare | Gaelic Grounds, Limerick |
| | P McMahon 3–0, M McCarthy 2–1, M Mackey 0–3, J Mackey 0–1. | | Flynn 1–0, Murphy 0–1. |

Final

| 30 July 1939 Final | Cork | 4–03 – 3–04 | Limerick | Thurles Sportsfield, Thurles |
| | T O'Sullivan 2–0, J Lynch 1–2, B Dineen 1–0, W Campbell 0–1. | | J McCarthy 2–0, P McMahon 1–0, M Mackey 0–3, M Ryan 0–1. |

=== All-Ireland Senior Hurling Championship ===
Semi-final

| 6 August 1939 Semi-final | Kilkenny | 1–16 – 3–01 | Galway | St. Cronan's Park, Roscrea |
| | J Langton 0–8, S O'Brien 1–0, J Walsh 0–2, J Mulcahy 0–2, T Leahy 0–1, P Phelan 0–1, T Leahy 0–1, B Brannigan 0–1. | | S Corcoran 1–1, MJ Flaherty 1–0, P O'Connor 1–0, | Referee: M Hennessy (Clare) |

Final

| 3 September 1939 Final | Kilkenny | 2–07 – 3–03 | Cork | Croke Park |
| | J Phelan 2–0, J Langton 0–3, T Leahy 0–2, J O'Brien 0–1, J Kelly 0–1. | | T O'Sullivan 2–1, J Lynch 1–2. | Attendance: 39,302; Referee: J Flaherty (Offaly) |

== Championship statistics ==
=== Scoring statistics ===
Top scorers overall

| Rank | Player | Club | Tally | Total | Matches | Average |
|---|---|---|---|---|---|---|
| 1 | Jim Langton | Kilkenny | 1–20 | 23 | 4 | 5.75 |
| 2 | Ted O'Sullivan | Cork | 7-01 | 22 | 3 | 7.33 |
| 3 | Paddy McMahon | Limerick | 6-00 | 18 | 3 | 6.00 |
| 4 | Willie Delaney | Laois | 5-01 | 16 | 2 | 8.00 |
| 5 | K. Whelan | Wexford | 5-00 | 15 | 2 | 7.50 |
| 6 | Paddy McSweeney | Dublin | 4-00 | 12 | 2 | 6.00 |
| 6 | Mick Brophy | Dublin | 4-00 | 12 | 2 | 6.00 |
| 6 | Paddy Norton | Laois | 4-00 | 12 | 2 | 6.00 |
| 6 | Jack Lynch | Cork | 2-06 | 12 | 3 | 4.00 |
| 10 | Mick Falvey | Meath | 3-01 | 10 | 2 | 5.00 |
| 10 | Bill Loughnane | Dublin | 3-01 | 10 | 2 | 5.00 |
| 10 | P. Farrell | Meath | 3-01 | 10 | 2 | 5.00 |

Top scorers in a single game

| Rank | Player | Club | Tally | Total | Opposition |
|---|---|---|---|---|---|
| 1 | Willie Delaney | Laois | 4-01 | 13 | Meath |
| 2 | Paddy Norton | Laois | 4-00 | 12 | Meath |
| 2 | K. Whelan | Wexford | 4-00 | 12 | Offaly |
| 4 | Mick Falvey | Meath | 3-01 | 10 | Westmeath |
| 4 | Bill Loughnane | Dublin | 3-01 | 10 | Wexford |
| 6 | Paddy McSweeney | Dublin | 3-00 | 9 | Kilkenny |
| 6 | Ted O'Sullivan | Cork | 3-00 | 9 | Waterford |
| 6 | Paddy McMahon | Limerick | 3-00 | 9 | Clare |
| 6 | Mick Brophy | Dublin | 3-00 | 9 | Wexford |
| 10 | Timmy Fitzpatrick | Laois | 2-02 | 8 | Meath |
| 10 | Jim Langton | Kilkenny | 0-08 | 8 | Galway |

=== Miscellaneous ===
- Kilkenny's victory over Cork in the All-Ireland final was the fourth time that Kilkenny beat them by just a single point. Previous one-point wins came in 1904, 1907 and 1912. Among the attendance was the poet Louis MacNeice who was visiting Dublin.

== Sources ==
- Corry, Eoghan, The GAA Book of Lists (Hodder Headline Ireland, 2005).
- Donegan, Des, The Complete Handbook of Gaelic Games (DBA Publications Limited, 2005).
- Horgan, Tim, Christy Ring: Hurling's Greatest (The Collins Press, 2007).
- Nolan, Pat, Flashbacks: A Half Century of Cork Hurling (The Collins Press, 2000).
- Sweeney, Éamonn, Munster Hurling Legends (The O'Brien Press, 2002).
