= 1927–28 National Hurling League =

Second season of the National Hurling League

League details
- Dates: November 1927 – April 1928
- Teams: 9

League champions
- Winners: Tipperary (1st win)
- Captain: Johnny Leahy

League runners-up
- Runners-up: Galway
- Captain: Jim Power

The 1927–28 National Hurling League was the second edition of the National Hurling League (NHL).

The nine participating teams were Cork, Dublin, Galway, Kilkenny, Laois, Limerick, Offaly, Tipperary and Wexford who agreed to play an eight-game format whereby each team would play each of their eight rivals once with two points awarded for a win and one point awarded for a drawn game. The team with the most points at the completion of the season would be declared National Hurling League champions.

Tipperary won the league after securing 14 points from their eight games. Galway were second with 12 points.

== National Hurling League ==
=== Table ===
Pos	Team	Pld	W	D	L	SF	SA	Diff	Pts	Notes
1	Tipperary	8	6	2	0	44-24	16-22	86	14	National League champions
2	Galway	8	5	0	3	28-39	34-26	-5	10	National League runners-up
3	Dublin	7	4	1	2	33-22	18-30	37	9	
4	Cork	7	4	0	3	35-27	21-12	57	8	
5	Laois	8	3	1	4	25-18	35-23	-35	7	
6	Limerick	7	3	1	3	24-21	27-20	-8	7	
7	Kilkenny	6	2	0	4	15-20	28-21	-40	4	
8	Offaly	6	1	1	4	15-13	27-20	-43	3	
9	Clare	7	1	0	6	18-20	31-30	-49	2	

=== Results ===
16 October 1927	Clare	5-03 - 5-04	Kilkenny	Cusack Park, Ennis

16 October 1927	Tipperary	4-04 - 4-04	Dublin	Thurles Sportsfield, Thurles

6 November 1927	Kilkenny	3-03 - 2-01	Offaly	St. James's Park, Kilkenny

6 November 1927	Dublin	4-02 - 4-04	Laois	Croke Park, Dublin

6 November 1927	Limerick	8-06 - 3-02	Clare	Markets Field, Limerick

6 November 1927	Tipperary	10-06 - 1-00	Galway	Thurles Sportsfield, Thurles

20 November 1927	Laois	3-00 - 3-00	Tipperary	O'Moore Park, Portlaoise

20 November 1927	Offaly	3-02 - 3-02	Limerick	St. Brendan's Park, Birr

4 December 1927	Limerick	2-04 - 3-02	Galway	Markets Field, Limerick

4 December 1927	Kilkenny	2-02 - 6-04	Laois	St. James's Park, Kilkenny
