= 1939–40 National Hurling League =

13th season of the National Hurling League

League details
- Dates: 2 October 1939 – 7 April 1940
- Teams: 9

League champions
- Winners: Cork (3rd win)
- Captain: Jack Lynch

League runners-up
- Runners-up: Tipperary
- Captain: Jimmy Maher

The 1939–40 National Hurling League was the 13th edition of the National Hurling League, which ran from 2 October 1939 until 7 April 1940.

The nine participating teams were Clare, Cork, Dublin, Galway, Kilkenny, Laois, Limerick, Tipperary and Waterford who were divided into two divisions. Two points awarded for a win and one point awarded for a drawn game..

Cork won the league, beating Tipperary by 8-9 to 6-4 in the final.

== National Hurling League ==
=== Group A ===
Pos	Team	Pld	W	D	L	Pts	Notes
1	Cork	4	4	0	0	8	National League champions
2	Kilkenny	4	3	0	1	6	
3	Limerick	4	2	0	2	4	
4	Waterford	4	1	0	3	2	
5	Clare	4	0	0	4	0	

=== Group B ===
Pos	Team	Pld	W	D	L	Pts	Notes
1	Tipperary	3	3	0	0	6	National League runners-up
2	Laois	3	2	0	1	4	
3	Galway	3	1	0	3	2	
4	Dublin	3	0	0	3	0	

=== Knock-out stage ===
Final

7 April 1940 Final	Cork	8-9 - 6-4	Tipperary	Cork Athletic Grounds, Cork
