= 1938–39 National Hurling League =

12th season of the National Hurling League

League details
- Dates: October 1938 – 30 April 1939
- Teams: 10

League champions
- Winners: Dublin (2nd win)
- Captain: Mick Gill, Junior

League runners-up
- Runners-up: Waterford
- Captain: John Keane

The 1938–39 National Hurling League was the 12th season of the NHL, an annual hurling competition for the GAA county teams.

== Overview ==
The National Hurling League featured three groups of teams - Group A, Group B and Group C. Waterford remained unbeaten in Group A, after recording three wins and one draw. In Group B Dublin had four wins from their four games. Group C only contained three teams, with Wexford winning both and topping the group. Dublin received a bye into the final, while Waterford defeated Wexford in a lone semi-final. Dublin won the subsequent final.

== Division placings ==
=== Group A ===
Pos	Team	Pld	W	D	L	Pts	Notes
1	Waterford	4	3	1	0	7	National League runners-up
2	Limerick	4	3	0	1	6	
3	Kilkenny	4	2	0	2	4	
4	Cork	4	1	1	2	3	
5	Clare	4	0	0	4	0	

=== Group B ===
Pos	Team	Pld	W	D	L	Pts	Notes
1	Dublin	4	4	0	0	8	National League champions
2	Galway	4	3	0	1	6	
3	Laois	4	2	0	2	4	
4	Tipperary	4	1	0	3	2	
5	Westmeath	4	0	0	4	0	

=== Group C ===
Pos	Team	Pld	W	D	L	Pts	Notes
1	Wexford	2	2	0	0	4	
2	Offaly	2	1	0	1	2	
3	Meath	2	0	0	2	0	

==== Results ====
===== Knock-out stages =====
2 April 1939 Semi-final	Wexford	3-4 - 5-7	Waterford	New Ross

30 April 1939 Final	Dublin	1-8 - 1-4	Waterford	Thurles Sportsfield
