= 1951 Kilkenny Senior Hurling Championship =

Annual hurling competition season

- Dates: 6 May – 4 November 1951
- Teams: 7
- Champions: Carrickshock (7th title); Jimmy Kelly (captain)
- Runners-up: Tullaroan; Mark Marnell (captain)

Tournament statistics
- Matches played: 8
- Goals scored: 40 (5 per match)
- Points scored: 97 (12.13 per match)

The 1951 Kilkenny Senior Hurling Championship was the 57th staging of the Kilkenny Senior Hurling Championship since its establishment by the Kilkenny County Board in 1887. The championship ran from 6 May to 4 November 1951.

Dicksboro were the defending champions, however, they were beaten by Carrickshock in the semi-finals.

The final was played on 4 November 1951 at Nowlan Park in Kilkenny, between Carrickshock and Tullaroan, in what was their fourth meeting in the final overall. Carrickshock won the match by 5–06 to 4–05 to claim their seventh championship title overall and a first title in eight years.

== Team changes ==
=== To Championship ===
Promoted from the Kilkenny Junior Hurling Championship

- Slieverue

=== From Championship ===
Regraded to the Kilkenny Junior Hurling Championship

- Galmoy
- Thomastown

== Results ==
=== First round ===
6 May 1951 First round	Carrickshock	3-06 - 2-01	Slieverue	Waterford Sportsfield

13 May 1951 First round	Graigue	4-03 - 2-09	Tullaroan	Nowlan Park

20 May 1951 First round	Éire Óg	4-08 - 1-01	Mooncoin	Thomastown Grounds

15 July 1950 First round replay	Graigue	2-04 - 1-08	Tullaroan	Nowlan Park

- Dicksboro received a bye in this round.

=== Semi-finals ===
12 August 1951 Semi-final	Carrickshock	3-04 - 3-01	Dicksboro	Nowlan Park

19 August 1951 Semi-final	Tullaroan	0-17 - 2-11	Éire Óg	Nowlan Park

9 September 1951 Semi-final replay	Tullaroan	2-10 - 2-03	Éire Óg	Nowlan Park

=== Final ===
4 November 1951 Final	Carrickshock	5-06 - 4-05	Tullaroan	Nowlan Park
				Referee: J Mulcahy (Kilkenny)
