= 1950 Kilkenny Senior Hurling Championship =

Annual Kilkenny hurling competition season

- Dates: 30 April – 26 November 1950
- Teams: 8
- Champions: Dicksboro (3rd title); Willie Hogan (captain)
- Runners-up: Éire Óg; Ramie Dowling (captain)

Tournament statistics
- Matches played: 9
- Goals scored: 60 (6.67 per match)
- Points scored: 133 (14.78 per match)

The 1950 Kilkenny Senior Hurling Championship was the 56th staging of the Kilkenny Senior Hurling Championship since its establishment by the Kilkenny County Board in 1887. The championship ran from 30 April to 26 November 1950.

Graigue were the defending champions, however, they were beaten by Tullaroan in the first round.

The final, a replay, was played on 26 November 1950 at Nowlan Park in Kilkenny, between Dicksboro and Éire Óg, in what was their first ever meeting in the final. Dicksboro won the match by 4–06 to 1–05 to claim their third championship title overall and a first title in 24 years.

== Team changes ==
=== To Championship ===
Promoted from the Kilkenny Junior Hurling Championship

- Galmoy

=== From Championship ===
Regraded to the Kilkenny Junior Hurling Championship

- Bennettsbridge

== Results ==
=== First round ===
30 April 1950 First round	Dicksboro	7-03 - 2-02	Galmoy	Freshford Grounds

14 May 1950 First round	Mooncoin	5-05 - 2-05	Thomastown	Nowlan Park

25 June 1950 First round	Éire Óg	5-09 - 3-13	Carrickshock	Thomastown Grounds

2 July 1950 First round	Tullaroan	2-09 - 2-05	Graigue	Nowlan Park

=== Semi-finals ===
30 July 1950 Semi-final	Dicksboro	5-06 - 1-09	Tullaroan	John Locke's Park

6 August 1950 Semi-final	Éire Óg	3-07 - 3-07	Mooncoin	Thomastown Grounds

20 August 1950 Semi-final replay	Éire Óg	4-08 - 2-09	Mooncoin	Thomastown Grounds

=== Final ===
15 October 1950 Final	Dicksboro	3-17 - 6-08	Éire Óg	Nowlan Park

=== Final replay ===
26 November 1950 Final replay	Dicksboro	4-06 - 1-05	Éire Óg	Nowlan Park
