= Paddy O'Brien (Éire Óg hurler) =

Irish hurler

Personal information
- Native name: Pádraig Ó Briain (Irish)
- Nickname: Chunky
- Born: 1921 Kilkenny, Ireland
- Died: January 1986 (aged 64) Kilkenny, Ireland
- Occupation: Plumber
- Height: 5 ft 10 in (178 cm)

Sport
- Sport: Hurling
- Position: Full-forward
Club
- Years: Club
- Éire Óg
Club titles
- Kilkenny titles: 4
Inter-county
- Years: County
- 1946-1947: Kilkenny
Inter-county titles
- Leinster titles: 2
- All-Irelands: 1
- NHL: 0

Patrick O'Brien (1921 - January 1986) was an Irish hurler. At club level he played with Éire Óg and was a two-time All-Ireland Championship winner with the Kilkenny senior hurling team.

== Playing career ==
O'Brien began his playing career at club level with Éire Óg, and helped them to their four county senior championship successes in 1939, 1944, 1945 and 1947. He played at minor level with Kilkenny in 1938 and again in 1939 when the team lost out to Cork in the All-Ireland final. O'Brien broke onto the Kilkenny senior team in 1946, winning a Leinster Championship in his debut year, and was a substitute on the 1947 All-Ireland Championship-winning side. He also gained representative honours with the Leinster inter-provincial team in the Railway Cup.

== Personal life and death ==
O'Brien worked for over 30 years as a plumber with Kilkenny Corporation. He was an active trade unionist and was chairman of the Kilkenny city branch of the Labour Party for nearly 20 years. O'Brien died aged 64 at St. Luke's Hospital in January 1986. He was survived by his wife Muriel, four sons and three daughters. His son, Liam O'Brien, was a four-time All-Ireland medal-winners with Kilkenny in the 1970s.

== Honours ==
Éire Óg

- Kilkenny Senior Hurling Championship: 1939, 1944, 1945, 1947

Kilkenny

- All-Ireland Senior Hurling Championship: 1947
- Leinster Senior Hurling Championship: 1946, 1947
- Leinster Minor Hurling Championship: 1939
