= 1958 Kilkenny Senior Hurling Championship =

Annual hurling competition season

- Dates: 6 July – 2 November 1958
- Teams: 11
- Champions: Tullaroan (19th title); Tom Hogan (captain)
- Runners-up: Bennettsbridge

Tournament statistics
- Matches played: 10
- Goals scored: 83 (8.3 per match)
- Points scored: 135 (13.5 per match)

The 1958 Kilkenny Senior Hurling Championship was the 64th staging of the Kilkenny Senior Hurling Championship since its establishment by the Kilkenny County Board in 1887. The championship ran from 6 July to 2 November 1958.

John Locke's were the defending champions, however, they were beaten by St Senan's in the first round.

The final was played on 2 November 1958 at Nowlan Park in Kilkenny, between Tullaroan and Bennettsbridge, in what was their second meeting in the final overall and a first meeting in the final in six years. Tullaroan won the match by 1–12 to 3–02 to claim their 19th championship title overall and a first title in 10 years.

== Team changes ==
=== To Championship ===
Promoted from the Kilkenny Junior Hurling Championship

- Tullogher

== Results ==
=== First round ===
6 July 1958 First round	Bennettsbridge	7-11 - 3-04	Glenmore	Grennan Sportsfield

20 July 1958 First round	Slieverue	3-08 - 4-03	Tullogher	Grennan Sportsfield

20 July 1958 First round	Éire Óg	6-12 - 3-06	Dicksboro	Nowlan Park

3 August 1958 First round	Tullaroan	4-12 - 2-01	James Stephens	Nowlan Park

17 August 1958 First round	St Senan's	4-07 - 3-08	John Locke's	Grennan Sportsfield

=== Second round ===
31 August 1958 Second round	Bennettsbridge	7-12 - 3-05	Graigue	Nowlan Park

14 September 1958 Second round	St Senan's	7-04 - 3-03	Slieverue	Grennan Sportsfield

=== Semi-finals ===
21 September 1958 Semi-final	Tullaroan	5-11 - 1-08	Éire Óg	Nowlan Park

28 September 1958 Semi-final	Bennettsbridge	12-04 - 2-02	St Senan's	Thomastown Grounds

=== Final ===
2 November 1958 Final	Tullaroan	1-12 - 3-02	Bennettsbridge	Nowlan Park, Kilkenny
	J Clohessy 0-6, W Hennessy 1-0, P Malone 0-3, S Clohessy 0-2, W Fitzgerald 0-1.		D Kennedy 1-1, J Carroll 1-1, M Kelly 1-0.
