= 1954 Kilkenny Senior Hurling Championship =

Annual hurling competition season

- Dates: 23 May – 10 October 1954
- Teams: 12
- Champions: Slieverue (1st title); Eddie O'Dwyer (captain)
- Runners-up: Tullaroan; Jim Hogan (captain)

Tournament statistics
- Matches played: 13
- Goals scored: 88 (6.77 per match)
- Points scored: 128 (9.85 per match)

The 1954 Kilkenny Senior Hurling Championship was the 60th staging of the Kilkenny Senior Hurling Championship since its establishment by the Kilkenny County Board in 1887. The championship ran from 23 May to 10 October 1954.

Bennettsbridge were the defending champions, however, they were beaten by Tullaroan in the second round.

The final was played on 10 October 1954 at Nowlan Park in Kilkenny, between Slieverue and Tullaroan, in what was their first ever meeting in the final. Slieverue won the match by 6–05 to 4–03 to claim their first ever championship title.

== Team changes ==
=== To Championship ===
Promoted from the Kilkenny Junior Hurling Championship

- Glenmore
- Thomastown

=== From Championship ===
Regraded to the Kilkenny Junior Hurling Championship

- Carrickshock
- St Kieran's

== Results ==
=== First round ===
23 May 1954 First round	Mooncoin	4-02 - 4-02	Dunnamaggin	Grennan Sportsfield

27 June 1954 First round	Slieverue	4-05 - 3-03	John Locke's	Grennan Sportsfield

4 July 1954 First round	Éire Óg	5-06 - 3-09	Dicksboro	Nowlan Park

4 July 1954 First round	Glenmore	8-02 - 5-00	Thomastown	The Rower Grounds

11 July 1954 First round	Danesfort	2-02 - 5-13	Bennettsbridge	Nowlan Park

25 July 1954 First round replay	Mooncoin	2-05 - 0-02	Dunnamaggin	Grennan Sportsfield

25 July 1954 First round	Tullaroan	3-03 - 2-06	Graigue	Nowlan Park

8 August 1954 First round replay	Tullaroan	2-08 - 2-03	Graigue	Nowlan Park

=== Second round ===
1 August 1954 Second round	Slieverue	2-08 - 3-01	Glenmore	Grennan Sportsfield

18 August 1954 Second round	Tullaroan	2-06 - 1-06	Bennettsbridge	Nowlan Park

29 August 1954 Second round	Mooncoin	5-09 - 5-02	Éire Óg	Waterford Gaelic Field

=== Semi-final ===
19 September 1954 Semi-final	Tullaroan	2-13 - 4-04	Mooncoin	Nowlan Park

- Slieverue received a bye in this round.

=== Final ===
10 October 1954 Final	Slieverue	6-05 - 4-03	Tullaroan	Nowlan Park
