= Jack Mulcahy (hurler) =

Irish hurler and Gaelic footballer

Personal information
- Native name: Seán Ó Maolcatha (Irish)
- Born: 23 November 1918 Ballybought St, Kilkenny, Ireland
- Died: 26 April 1962 (aged 43) John's Green, Kilkenny, Ireland
- Occupation: Caretaker
- Height: 5 ft 8 in (173 cm)

Sport
- Sport: Hurling
- Position: Full-forward
Club
- Years: Club
- Éire Óg
Club titles
- Kilkenny titles: 4
Inter-county
- Years: County
- 1938–1950: Kilkenny
Inter-county titles
- Leinster titles: 7
- All-Irelands: 2
- NHL: 0

John Mulcahy (23 November 1918 – 26 April 1962) was an Irish hurler. At club level he played with Éire Óg and was a two-time All-Ireland Championship winner with the Kilkenny senior hurling team.

== Playing career ==
After coming to hurling prominence as a student at CBS Kilkenny, Mulcahy won back-to-back All-Ireland Minor Championships with Kilkenny in 1935 and 1936. He was promoted to the Kilkenny junior side in 1938, and, in the following year, he won his first senior All-Ireland SHC medal when Kilkenny defeated Cork in the "thunder and lightning" final. From 1939 onward, Mulcahy was a regular on the senior team and struck up a forward partnership with Seánie O'Brien and Jim Langton. After losing back-to-back finals in 1945 and 1946, he claimed a second senior All-Ireland winners' medal after a defeat of Cork in one of the greatest finals of all in 1947. Mulcahy played in his fifth All-Ireland SHC final in 1950, lining out at full-forward against Tipperary, but Kilkenny were beaten by a point. He retired from inter-county hurling shortly after this, by which time he had also claimed seven Leinster Championship titles.

Mulcahy was the holder of four county senior championship medals with Éire Óg, and had the distinction of winning county medals in four grades – minor, junior intermediate and senior – in the space of five years. As a referee, Mulcahy took charge of numerous games at club and inter-county level.

== Later life and death ==
Mulcahy worked for some years in the Kilkenny Boot Factory, before finding employment as a caretaker at the Kilkenny County Council offices. He died aged 43 on 26 April 1962, after suffering from colon cancer, and was survived by his wife and three sons.

== Honours ==
Éire Óg

- Kilkenny Senior Hurling Championship (4): 1939, 1944, 1945, 1947
- Kilkenny Intermediate Hurling Championship (1): 1937
- Kilkenny Junior Hurling Championship (1): 1936
- Kilkenny Minor Hurling Championship (3): 1934, 1935, 1936

Kilkenny

- All-Ireland Senior Hurling Championship (2): 1939, 1047
- Leinster Senior Hurling Championship (7): 1939, 1940, 1943, 1945, 1946, 1947, 1950
- All-Ireland Minor Hurling Championship (2): 1935, 1936
- Leinster Minor Hurling Championship (2): 1935, 1936

Sporting positions
Preceded by Peter Blanchfield	Kilkenny Senior Hurling Captain; 1946	Succeeded by Dan Kennedy
