= Bill Cahill (hurler) =

Irish hurler (1923–2001)

Personal information
- Native name: Liam Ó Cathail (Irish)
- Born: 1 May 1923 Kilbrahan, County Kilkenny, Ireland
- Died: 18 August 2001 (aged 78) Waterford, Ireland
- Occupation: Creamery manager
- Height: 5 ft 9 in (175 cm)

Sport
- Sport: Hurling
- Position: Full-forward
Clubs
- Years: Club
- Graigue; Slieverue
Club titles
- Kilkenny titles: 2
College
- Years: College
- University College Cork
College titles
- Fitzgibbon titles: 1
Inter-county
- Years: County
- 1946–1947: Kilkenny
Inter-county titles
- Leinster titles: 1
- All-Irelands: 1
- NHL: 0

William Cahill (1 May 1923 – 18 August 2001) was an Irish hurler. At club level, he played with and trained Graigue and SLieverue, and at inter-county level was a member of the Kilkenny senior hurling team.

== Early life ==
Cahill was born and raised in Kilbrahan, County Kilkenny. He played hurling at all levels during his time as a secondary school student at Callan CBS and claimed a provincial winners' medal in 1941. Cahill later played with University College Cork, during his agricultural science studies there, and won a Fitzgibbon Cup medal in 1947.

== Club career ==
Cahill was a founder-member of the Graigue club in 1943. The club was still in its infancy when it won the Kilkenny JHC title in 1946, following an 8–05 to 3–00 win over St Kieran's. Three years later, Cahill was player–trainer when Graigue beat Tullaroan to win their sole Kilkenny SHC title. He later transferred to the Slieverue club and was again player–trainer when the club beat Tullaroan by 6–05 to 4–03 to win the Kilkenny SHC in 1954.

== Inter-county career ==
Cahill first appeared on the inter-county scene with Kilkenny as a member of the junior team. He won a Leinster JHC medal in his first year with the team, before later claiming an All-Ireland JHC medal after lining out at corner-forwrad in the 5–04 to 2–02 win over London in the 1946 All-Ireland JHC final.

Cahill was one of a number of players from the junior team that earned immediate promotion to the senior team for the 1946–47 National League. He was retained for the championship team and won a Leinster SHC medal that year, following a 7–10 to 3–06 win over Dublin. Cahill was at full=forward when Kilkenny subsequently won their first All-Ireland SHC in eight years, after a one–point win over Cork in the 1947 All-Ireland SHC final.

== Death ==
Cahill died on 18 August 2001, at the age of 78.

== Honours ==
=== Player ===
Callan CBS

- Leinster Colleges Senior Hurling Championship (1): 1941

University College Cork

- Fitzgibbon Cup (1): 1947

Graigue

- Kilkenny Senior Hurling Championship (1): 1949
- Kilkenny Junior Hurling Championship (1): 1946

Slieverue

- Kilkenny Senior Hurling Championship (1): 1954

Kilkenny

- All-Ireland Senior Hurling Championship (1): 1947
- Leinster Senior Hurling Championship (1): 1947
- All-Ireland Junior Hurling Championship (1): 1946
- Leinster Junior Hurling Championship (1): 1946

=== Trainer ===
Graigue

- Kilkenny Senior Hurling Championship (1): 1949

Slieverue

- Kilkenny Senior Hurling Championship (1): 1954
