= 1957 Kilkenny Senior Hurling Championship =

Annual hurling competition season

- Dates: 26 May – 1 December 1957
- Teams: 10
- Champions: John Locke's (1st title); Mick Kenny (captain)
- Runners-up: Slieverue; Dick Rockett (captain)

Tournament statistics
- Matches played: 11
- Goals scored: 75 (6.82 per match)
- Points scored: 137 (12.45 per match)

The 1957 Kilkenny Senior Hurling Championship was the 63rd staging of the Kilkenny Senior Hurling Championship since its establishment by the Kilkenny County Board in 1887. The championship ran from 26 May to 1 December 1957.

Bennettsbridge were the defending champions.

The final was played on 1 December 1957 at Nowlan Park in Kilkenny, between John Locke's and SLieverue, in what was their first ever meeting in the final. John Locke's won the match by 4–04 to 0–05 to claim their first ever championship title.

== Team changes ==
=== To Championship ===
Promoted from the Kilkenny Junior Hurling Championship

- St Senan's

== Results ==
=== First round ===
26 May 1957 First round	Dicksboro	3-02 - 4-06	Slieverue	Grennan Sportsfield

2 June 1957 First round	Éire Óg	4-11 - 6-05	John Locke's	Grennan Sportsfield

16 June 1957 First round	Graigue	5-04 - 5-02	Bennettsbridge	Nowlan Park

23 June 1957 First round	St Senan's	3-07 - 4-02	Tullaroan	Nowlan Park

21 July 1957 First round	Glenmore	9-04 - 2-05	James Stephens	Nowlan Park

28 July 1957 First round replay	Éire Óg	4-06 - 5-09	John Locke's	Nowlan Park

=== Second round ===
18 August 1957 Second round	Slieverue	5-08 - 2-06	Glenmore	Grennan Sportsfield

- Graigue, John Locke's and St Senan's received a bye in this round.

=== Semi-finals ===
18 August 1957 Semi-final	John Locke's	2-11 - 2-07	Graigue	Nowlan Park

15 September 1957 Semi-final	Slieverue	1-09 - 1-09	St Senan's	Thomastown Grounds

3 November 1957 Semi-final replay	Slieverue	3-10 - 1-05	St Senan's	Nowlan Park

=== Final ===
1 December 1957 Final	John Locke's	4-04 - 0-05	Slieverue	Nowlan Park, Kilkenny
	M Gardiner 1-3, T Leahy 1-0, J Wall 1-0, M Lynch 1-0, P Lennon 0-1.		A Rockett 0-3, W Cahill 0-1, S Griffin 0-1.
