= Dick Rockett =

Irish hurler

Personal information
- Native name: Risteárd Roicéid (Irish)
- Born: 1931 (age 94–95) Slieverue, County Kilkenny, Ireland
- Occupations: Farmer, publican
- Height: 5 ft 11 in (180 cm)

Sport
- Sport: Hurling
- Position: Left corner-forward
Club
- Years: Club
- 1948–1963: Slieverue
Club titles
- Kilkenny titles: 1
Inter-county*
Years	County	Apps (scores)
1953–1959	Kilkenny	12 (13–04)
Inter-county titles
- Leinster titles: 3
- All-Irelands: 1
- NHL: 0
- *Inter County team apps and scores correct as of 16:41, 28 June 2014.

Richard Rockett (born 1931) is an Irish former hurler. At club level, he played with Slieverue and at inter-county level with the Kilkenny senior hurling team.

== Career ==
Born and raised in Slieverue, County Kilkenny, Rockett was educated at the De La Salle College in Waterford. He first played for Slieverue as a member of the junior team beaten by Bennettsbridge in 1948. Two years later, Rockett won a Kilkenny JHC medal, following a 4–06 to 5–02 win over Urlingford in the final. He added a Kilkenny SHC medal to his collection in 1957, after a 6–05 to 4–03 defeat of Tullaroan in the final. Rockett captained Slieverue to a defeat by John Locke's in the 1957 Kilkenny SHC final.

Rockett first played for Kilkenny as goalkeeper on the junior team that beat London to win the All-Ireland JHC title in October 1951. He progressed to the senior team and was reserve goalkeeper on the Leinster SHC-winning team in 1953. Rockett lined out at right corner-forward when Kilkenny beat Waterford by 4–10 to 3–12 in the 1957 All-Ireland SHC final. He continued to line out with Kilkenny until 1959, by which time he had also won three Leinster SHC medal.

Rockett's performances at inter-county level earned his inclusion on the Leinster inter-provincial team. He won a Railway Cup medal in March 1956, after a 5–11 to 1–07 win over Munster in the final.

== Personal life ==
Following Jimmy Lynam's death in August 2026, Rockett became the oldest living All-Ireland medal winner.

== Honours ==
Slieverue

- Kilkenny Senior Hurling Championship (1): 1954
- Kilkenny Junior Hurling Championship (1): 1950

Kilkenny

- All-Ireland Senior Hurling Championship (1): 1957
- Leinster Senior Hurling Championship (3): 1953, 1957, 1958
- Oireachtas Cup (1): 1957
- All-Ireland Junior Hurling Championship (1): 1951
- Leinster Junior Hurling Championship (1): 1951

Leinster

- Railway Cup (1): 1956

Achievements
Preceded by Jimmy Lynam	Oldest living All-Ireland medal winner 2026-	Succeeded by Incumbent
