= P. J. Garvan =

Irish hurler (1928–2021)

Personal information
- Native name: P. S. Ó Gairbhín (Irish)
- Born: 1928 James’ Green, Kilkenny, Ireland
- Died: 23 February 2021 (aged 92) Ballycallan, County Kilkenny, Ireland
- Occupation: Brewery employee
- Height: 5 ft 11 in (180 cm)

Sport
- Sport: Hurling
- Position: Midfield
Club
- Years: Club
- Dicksboro
Club titles
- Kilkenny titles: 1
Inter-county
Years	County	Apps (scores)
1949-1957	Kilkenny	15
Inter-county titles
- Leinster titles: 3
- All-Irelands: 1
- NHL: 0

Patrick J. Garvan (1928 - 23 February 2021) was an Irish hurler who played for Kilkenny Senior Championship club Dicksboro and at inter-county level with the Kilkenny senior hurling team. He usually lined out at midfield.

== Career ==
Garvan first played hurling with the Dicksboro club. He was a member of the club's senior team that beat Éire Óg to win the 1950 Kilkenny SHC title. It was around this time that Garvan joined the Kilkenny senior hurling team. He made 15 championship appearances and was a non-playing substitute when Kilkenny beat Waterford to win the All-Ireland Championship title in 1957 1957. Garvan also won three Leinster Championship medals.

== Death ==
Garvan died at his residence in Ballycallan, County Kilkenny on 23 February 2021, aged 92.

== Honours ==
Dicksboro

- Kilkenny Senior Hurling Championship: 1950

Kilkenny

- All-Ireland Senior Hurling Championship: 1957
- Leinster Senior Hurling Championship: 1950, 1953, 1957
- Oireachtas Cup: 1957
