= 2017 Kilkenny Senior Hurling League =

- Dates: 21 April - 16 September 2017
- Teams: 12
- Sponsor: St. Canice's Credit Union
- Champions: Dicksboro (3rd title)
- Runners-up: O'Loughlin Gaels

The 2017 Kilkenny Senior Hurling League was the 24th staging of the competition since its establishment by the Kilkenny County Board in 1992.

The league competition consisted of 12 teams divided into two groups of six and ran from 21 April to 16 September 2017.

The two second-placed teams in each group qualified to compete in the shield final. In this game Carrickshock defeated Clara by 2–18 to 2–11.

The two first-placed teams in each group qualified for the league final in which Dicksboro defeated O'Loughlin Gaels by 0–18 to 1–14 at UPMC Nowlan Park on 16 September 2017. It was the club's third league title.

== Results ==
=== Group Stage ===
==== Group A Table ====
Team	P	W	D	L	F	A	+/-	Pts	Qualification	
O'Loughlin Gaels	5	4	1	0	107	82	25	9	league final	championship quarter-final
Carrickshock	5	3	1	1	97	97	0	7	shield final	championship quarter-final
Erin's Own	5	2	1	2	103	85	18	5	championship round 1	
Rower–Inistioge	5	1	3	1	101	102	-1	5	championship round 1	
Mullinavat	5	1	2	2	110	102	8	4	championship round 1	
St. Martin's	5	0	0	5	81	131	-50	0	championship round 1	

==== Group A results ====
April 22, 2017 Round 1	Erin's Own	2-18 – 2-11	Mullinavat
				Venue: Danesfort
				Referee: P Cahill

April 22, 2017 Round 1	Carrickshock	1-18 – 1-18	Rower–Inistioge
				Venue: Thomastown
				Referee: R Byrne

April 23, 2017 Round 1	O'Loughlin Gaels	2-20 – 1-8	St. Martin's
				Venue: Canon Kearns Park
				Referee: P Burke

May 6, 2017 Round 2	Mullinavat	1-17 – 1-17	O'Loughlin Gaels
				Venue: Hugginstown
				Referee: P Cahill

May 6, 2017 Round 2	Rower–Inistioge	0-16 – 2-10	Erin's Own
				Venue: Palmerstown
				Referee: G Rafter

May 6, 2017 Round 2	St. Martin's	1-14 – 0-18	Carrickshock
				Venue: Pairc Sheamuis Stiopháin
				Referee: J Walsh

May 19, 2017 Round 3	Rower–Inistioge	2-14 – 3-11	Mullinavat
				Venue: Thomastown
				Referee: M O'Sullivan

May 20, 2017 Round 3	Carrickshock	0-16 – 2-15	O'Loughlin Gaels
				Venue: Bennettsbridge
				Referee: O Kenny

May 20, 2017 Round 3	St. Martin's	0-11 – 1-24	Erin's Own
				Venue: Ballyragget
				Referee: S Cleere

August 11, 2017 Round 4	O'Loughlin Gaels	1-18 – 1-15	Rower–Inistioge
				Venue: Thomastown
				Referee: G Quilty

August 12, 2017 Round 4	Mullinavat	2-28 – 2-12	St. Martin's
				Venue: Danesfort
				Referee: S Cleere

August 12, 2017 Round 4	Erin's Own	1-16 – 3-13	Carrickshock
				Venue: Tom Ryall Park
				Referee: C Everard

August 22, 2017 Round 5	St. Martin's	3-15 – 2-20	Rower–Inistioge
				Venue: Gowran
				Referee: P Cahill

August 22, 2017 Round 5	Carrickshock	1-17 – 1-16	Mullinavat
				Venue: Piltown
				Referee: J Walsh

August 22, 2017 Round 5	O'Loughlin Gaels	1-16 – 0-17	Erin's Own
				Venue: Jenkinstown
				Referee: P Burke

==== Group B Table ====
Team	P	W	D	L	F	A	+/-	Pts	Qualification	
Dicksboro	5	5	0	0	107	76	31	10	league final	championship quarter-final
Clara	5	3	0	2	95	97	-2	6	shield final	championship quarter-final
Ballyhale Shamrocks	5	2	1	2	100	96	4	5	championship round 1	
Danesfort	5	2	1	2	98	114	-16	5	championship round 1	
James Stephens	5	1	0	4	99	103	-4	2	championship round 1	
Bennettsbridge	5	1	0	4	95	108	-13	2	championship round 1	

==== Group B results ====
April 21, 2017 Round 1	Clara	2-16 – 1-21	Danesfort
				Venue: Bennettsbridge
				Referee: O Kenny

April 23, 2017 Round 1	Dicksboro	0-17 – 1-10	Ballyhale Shamrocks
				Venue: John Locke Park
				Referee: R Dowling

April 23, 2017 Round 1	Bennettsbridge	0-15 – 1-22	James Stephens
				Venue: Clara
				Referee: C Everard

May 5, 2017 Round 2	Ballyhale Shamrocks	0-17 – 2-16	Clara
				Venue: Thomastown
				Referee: G Quilty

May 7, 2017 Round 2	Danesfort	0-17 – 3-13	Bennettsbridge
				Venue: Nowlan Park
				Referee: J Kennedy

May 7, 2017 Round 2	James Stephens	1-13 – 1-15	Dicksboro
				Venue: Nowlan Park
				Referee: M O'Sullivan

May 20, 2017 Round 3	Danesfort	1-9 – 5-13	Dicksboro
				Venue: Tom Ryall Park
				Referee: P Burke

May 20, 2017 Round 3	James Stephens	2-13 – 3-17	Ballyhale Shamrocks
				Venue: Danesfort
				Referee: P Dunphy

May 20, 2017 Round 3	Bennettsbridge	0-18 – 1-16	Clara
				Venue: Pairc Sheamuis Stiopháin
				Referee: R Dowling

August 11, 2017 Round 4	Clara	1-16 – 2-11	James Stephens
				Venue: Nowlan Park
				Referee: J Kennedy

August 12, 2017 Round 4	Dicksboro	2-17 – 1-19	Bennettsbridge
				Venue: Pairc Sheamuis Stiopháin
				Referee: R Byrne

August 12, 2017 Round 4	Danesfort	0-20 – 2-14	Ballyhale Shamrocks
				Venue: Danesfort
				Referee: E Crowley

August 22, 2017 Round 5	Danesfort	3-16 – 1-19	James Stephens
				Venue: Tom Ryall Park
				Referee: O Kenny

August 22, 2017 Round 5	Bennettsbridge	1-15 – 2-18	Ballyhale Shamrocks
				Venue: John Locke Park
				Referee: G Quilty

August 22, 2017 Round 5	Clara	0-13 – 0-21	Dicksboro
				Venue: Thomastown
				Referee: R Dowling

=== Knockout Stage ===
==== Shield Final ====
September 16, 2017	Clara	2-11 – 2-18	Carrickshock
				Venue: Nowlan Park
				Referee: R Dowling

==== League Final ====
September 16, 2017	Dicksboro	0-18 – 1-14	O'Loughlin Gaels
				Venue: Nowlan Park
				Referee: J Kennedy
