= Pádraig Lennon =

Irish hurler

Personal information
- Native name: Pádraig Ó Leannáin (Irish)
- Born: 1923 Kilkenny, Ireland
- Died: 8 September 1990 (aged 67) Drogheda, County Louth, Ireland
- Occupation: Garage foreman
- Height: 5 ft 7 in (170 cm)

Sport
- Sport: Hurling
- Position: Left corner-forward
Club
- Years: Club
- Éire Óg
Club titles
- Kilkenny titles: 3
Inter-county
- Years: County
- 1946-1947: Kilkenny
Inter-county titles
- Leinster titles: 1
- All-Irelands: 1
- NHL: 0

Patrick Lennon (1923 – 8 September 1990), known as Pádraig Lennon, was an Irish hurler who played for club side Éire Óg and at inter-county level with the Kilkenny senior hurling team. He usually lined out as a corner-forward.

== Career ==
Lennon played hurling as a schoolboy with the Kilkenny CBS team, while simultaneously lining out at juvenile and underage levels with the Éire Óg club. He progressed onto the club's senior team and won three Kilkenny SHC titles between 1944 and 1947. Lennon first appeared on the inter-county scene when he earned a call-up to the Kilkenny senior hurling team during the 1946-47 National Hurling League. He was a non-playing substitute, alongside his brother-in-law Jim Langton, in the defeat of Cork in the 1947 All-Ireland final. Lennon spent much of his later years working as a coach and selector at all levels with the Clara club.

== Death ==
Lennon died on 8 September 1990 after taking ill at a Clara juvenile hurling game at Mosney Holiday Camp.

== Honours ==
Éire Óg

- Kilkenny Senior Hurling Championship: 1944, 1945, 1947

Kilkenny

- All-Ireland Senior Hurling Championship: 1947
- Leinster Senior Hurling Championship: 1947
