= John Fitzpatrick (hurler) =

Irish hurler

Personal information
- Native name: Seán Mac Giolla Pádraig (Irish)
- Born: 18 September 1905 Knocktopher, County Kilkenny, Ireland
- Died: 3 December 1990 (aged 85) Kilkenny, Ireland
- Occupation: Farmer

Sport
- Sport: Hurling
- Position: Centre-forward
Clubs
- Years: Club
- Knockmoylan; Carrickshock
Club titles
- Kilkenny titles: 2
Inter-county
- Years: County
- 1932-1934: Kilkenny
Inter-county titles
- Leinster titles: 2
- All-Irelands: 2
- NHL: 1

John Fitzpatrick (18 September 1905 – 3 December 1990) was an Irish hurler who played for Kilkenny Senior Championship club Carrickshock. He played for the Kilkenny senior hurling team for three seasons, during which time he usually lined out as a centre-forward.

== Honours ==
Knockmoylan

- Kilkenny Junior Hurling Championship (1): 1926

Carrickshock

- Kilkenny Senior Hurling Championship (2): 1931, 1938
- Kilkenny Junior Hurling Championship (1): 1928

Kilkenny

- All-Ireland Senior Hurling Championship (2): 1932, 1933
- Leinster Senior Hurling Championship (2): 1932, 1933
- National Hurling League (1): 1932–33
