= Mark Marnell =

Irish hurler

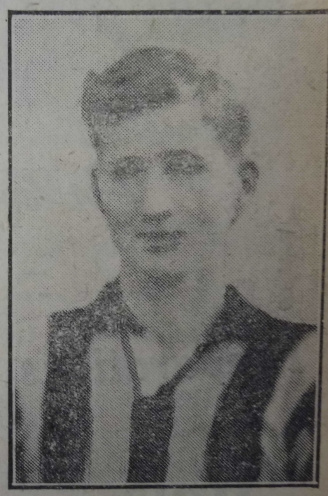

Personal information
- Native name: Marc Ó Mearnáil (Irish)
- Born: 28 September 1925 Danesfort, County Kilkenny, Ireland
- Died: 9 July 1992 (aged 66) Bennettsbridge, County Kilkenny, Ireland
- Occupation: Community welfare officer
- Height: 5 ft 8 in (173 cm)

Sport
- Sport: Hurling
- Position: Left corner-back
Clubs
- Years: Club
- Danesfort; Tullaroan; Danesfort–Dunnamaggin
Club titles
- Kilkenny titles: 1
Inter-county
- Years: County
- 1946-1956: Kilkenny
Inter-county titles
- Leinster titles: 3
- All-Irelands: 1
- NHL: 0

Mark Marnell (28 September 1926 – 9 July 1992) was an Irish hurler. At club level, he played with Tullaroan and Danesfort, and at inter-county level with the Kilkenny senior hurling team.

== Early life ==
Marnell was born and raised in Cuffesgrange, County Kilkenny. He played hurling at all levels during his time as a student at St Kieran's College and won a Leinster Colleges SHC medal in 1944. Marnell later played when St Kieran's College were beaten by St Flannan's College in the 1944 All-Ireland Colleges SHC final.

== Club career ==
Although born and raised in Danesfort, Marnell first played hurling with the nearby Tullaroan club. After losing the 1947 Kilkenny SHC final to Éire Óg, he was centre-back when Tullaroan claimed the Kilkenny SHC title in 1948. Marnell played in a further three finals between 1949 and 1952, before the parish rule was introduced and resulted in him joining a Danesfort–Dunnamaggin amalgamtion.

== Inter-county career ==
Marnell first appeared on the inter-county scene with Kilkenny as a member of the junior team. He won a Leinster JHC medal in his first year with the team, before later claiming an All-Ireland JHC medal after lining out at corner-back in the 5–04 to 2–02 win over London in the 1946 All-Ireland JHC final.

Marnell was one of a number of players from the junior team that earned immediate promotion to the senior team in 1947. He won his first Leinster SHC medal that year, after lining out at corner-back in the 7–10 to 3–06 win over Dublin. Marnell lined out in the same position when Kilkenny subsequently won their first All-Ireland SHC in eight years, after a one–point win over Cork in the 1947 All-Ireland SHC final.

Kilkenny failed to retain their provincial title, however, Marnell claimed his second Leinster SHC medal in 1950, after a 3–11 to 2–11 defeat of Wexford. He again lined out at corner-back in the 1950 All-Ireland SHC final defeat by Tipperary. Marnell collected a third and final Leinster SHC medal in 1953, before injury resulted in him retiring from inter-county hurling in 1956.

== Inter-provincial career ==
Marnell's performances with Kilkenny resulted in his selection for the Leinster inter-provinical team. He was a regular at corner-back in a number of campaigns, however, he ended his career without a Railway Cup medal.

== Death ==
Marnell died after a brief illness on 9 July 1992, at the age of 66.

== Honours ==
St Kieran's College

- Leinster Colleges Senior Hurling Championship: 1944

Tullaroan

- Kilkenny Senior Hurling Championship: 1948

Kilkenny

- All-Ireland Senior Hurling Championship: 1947
- Leinster Senior Hurling Championship: 1947, 1950, 1953
- All-Ireland Junior Hurling Championship: 1946
- Leinster Junior Hurling Championship: 1946
