= 2016 Kilkenny Intermediate Hurling Championship =

- Dates: 2 October 2016 – 6 November 2016
- Teams: 12
- Sponsor: Michael Lyng Motors
- Champions: Carrickshock (2nd title); John Tennyson (captain); Tommy Shefflin (manager)
- Runners-up: Tullogher-Rosbercon; Mark Tyler (manager)
- Relegated: Conahy Shamrocks

Tournament statistics
- Matches played: 14
- Top scorer(s): Kevin Farrell (1-23)

The 2016 Kilkenny Intermediate Hurling Championship was the 52nd staging of the Kilkenny Intermediate Hurling Championship since its establishment by the Kilkenny County Board in 1929. The championship began on 2 October 2016 and ended on 6 November 2016.

On 6 November 2016, Carrickshock won the championship after a 0–13 to 0–06 defeat of Tullogher-Rosbercon in the final at Nowlan Park. It was their second championship overall and their first title since 2004.

Carrickshock's Kevin Farrell was the championship's top scorer with 1-23.

== Team changes ==
=== To Championship ===
Promoted from the Kilkenny Junior Hurling Championship

- Glenmore

Relegated from the Kilkenny Senior Hurling Championship

- Carrickshock

=== From Championship ===
Promoted to the Kilkenny Senior Hurling Championship

- Bennettsbridge

Relegated to the Kilkenny Junior Hurling Championship

- Emeralds

== Results ==
=== First round ===
2 October 2016 First round	Dunnamaggin	0-14 - 2-20	St. Patrick's Ballyragget	Palmerstown Pitch, Kilkenny
	S O'Neill 0-4, E Kearney 0-3, J Fitzpatrick 0-2, R Coffey 0-2, M Cody 0-1, P Kirwan 0-1, T Maher 0-1.		J Brennan 1-3, S Kenny 1-3, K Kelly 0-5, B Staunton 0-3, M Brennan 0-3, R Helay 0-2, G Brennan 0-1.

2 October 2016 First round	Lisdowney	2-10 - 0-11	Young Irelands	Páirc Shéamuis Stíopháin, Kilkenny
	R Hickey 1-6, C O'Carroll 1-0, S Phelan 0-1, W Kenny 0-1, M Phelan 0-1, V Fitzpatrick 0-1.		P Holden 0-8, S Carey 0-2, S Keogh 0-1.

2 October 2016 First round	St. Lachtain's	1-11 - 0-13	Graigue-Ballycallan	Tullaroan
	N McGree 1-2, L Hickey 0-4, B Quinn 0-3, J Fitzpatrick 0-1, D Brennan 0-1.		T Ryan 0-10, A Burke 0-1, B Ryan 0-1, E Brennan 0-1.

2 October 2016 First round	Thomastown	0-19 - 0-11	Conahy Shamrocks	St. John's Park, Kilkenny
	R Donnelly 0-10, R O'Hara 0-3, J Donnelly 0-2, JJ Farrell 0-2, T O'Harahan 0-1, C Butler 0-1.		S Brennan 0-10, B Murphy 0-1.

=== Relegation playoff ===
22 October 2016 Playoff	Conahy Shamrocks	1-11 - 1-15	Young Irelands	St. John's Park, Kilkenny
	S Brennan 0-7, J Buggy 1-1, O Feehan 0-1, E Delaney 0-1, A Healy 0-1.		P Holden 1-8, C Nolan 0-2, JJ Lennon 0-2, S Kehoe 0-1, D Carroll 0-1, JP Treacy 0-1.

=== Quarter-finals ===
8 October 2016 Quarter-final	Tullaroan	3-20 - 3-17	St. Lachtain's	Páirc Shéamuis Stíopháin, Kilkenny
	S Walsh 1-9, Pádraig Walsh 1-7, P Buggy 1-0, Tommy Walsh (V) 0-1, Tommy Walsh (M) 0-1, Peter Walsh 0-1, Martin Keoghan 0-1.		S Donnelly 2-2, L Hickey 0-8, B Quinn 1-0, J Fitzpatrick 0-2, M McGree 0-2, D Brennan 0-1, B Kennedy 0-1, P Campion 0-1.

8 October 2016 Quarter-final	Carrickshock	1-20 - 0-08	Lisdowney	Tom Ryall Park, Kilmanagh
	K Farrell 1-9, M Dwyer 0-4, J Power 0-2, D Brennan 0-2, B Donovan 0-2, M Rohan 0-1.		R Hickey 0-5, M Phelan 0-1, C Mackey 0-1, M Kenny 0-1.

9 October 2016 Quarter-final	Tullogher-Rosbercon	0-17 - 0-17	Thomastown	Inistioge
	C O'Donoghue 0-8, W Walsh 0-5, B Lawlor 0-1, M Cottrell 0-1, J Barron 0-1, C Hennessy 0-1.		R Donnelly 0-6, R O'Hara 0-3, JJ Farrell 0-3, T O'Hanrahan 0-2, A Burke 0-2, J Donnelly 0-1.

9 October 2016 Quarter-final	Glenmore	0-16 - 0-16	St. Patrick's Ballyragget	St. John's Park, Kilkenny
	E Murphy 0-6, A Murphy 0-4, M Phelan 0-3, M Aylward 0-1, S Murphy 0-1, D Croke 0-1.		M Brennan 0-6, J Brennan 0-3, M Staunton 0-2, G Brennan 0-1, B Staunton 0-1, S Kenny 0-1, C Delaney 0-1, R Healy 0-1.

15 October 2016 Quarter-final replay	Tullogher-Rosbercon	1-15 - 0-17	Thomastown	Inistioge
	C O'Donoghue 0-5, J Shiely 1-1, C Hennessy 0-4, B Lawlor 0-2, B Ryan 0-1, W Walsh 0-1, E Cullinane 0-1.		R Donnelly 0-9, A Burke 0-2, J Donnelly 0-1, C Butler 0-1, R O'Hara 0-1, JJ Farrell 0-1, D Walsh 0-1, T O'Hanrahan 0-1.

15 October 2016 Quarter-final replay	Glenmore	0-24 - 3-14	St. Patrick's Ballyragget	St. John's Park, Kilkenny
	A Murphy 0-13, E Murphy 0-5, S Murphy 0-2, E Aylward 0-2, P Roche 0-1, E Vereker 0-1.		M Brennan 0-7, J Brennan 0-5, C Delaney 1-1, E Bergin 1-0, B Staunton 1-0, G Brennan 0-1.

=== Semi-finals ===
23 October 2016 Semi-final	Glenmore	0-11 - 2-11	Tullogher-Rosbercon	Nowlan Park, Kilkenny
	A Murphy 0-4, G Aylward 0-4, E Murphy 0-2, P Roche 0-1.		C O'Donoghue 0-8, C Hennessy 2-1, T O'Connor 0-1, L Barron 0-1.

23 October 2016 Semi-final	Carrickshock	1-18 - 1-17	Tullaroan	Nowlan Park, Kilkenny
	K Farrell 0-9, John Power 0-4, Jamie Power 1-0, M Rice 0-2, D Brennan 0-1, R Power 0-1.		S Walsh 0-7, J Walton 1-2, Tommy Walsh (V) 0-3, M Walsh 0-1, P Buggy 0-1, Pádraig Walsh 0-1, Peter Walsh 0-1, K Coogan 0-1.

=== Final ===
6 November 2016 Final	Carrickshock	0-13 - 0-06	Tullogher-Rosbercon	Nowlan Park, Kilkenny
	K Farrell 0-5, J Power 0-2, J Tennyson 0-1, B Donovan 0-1, D Walsh 0-1, D Brennan 0-1, M Dwyer 0-1, J Butler 0-1.		C O'Donoghue 0-4, W Walsh 0-1, L Barron 0-1.	Referee: P Burke (Emeralds)

== Championship statistics ==
=== Top scorers ===
Top scorers overall

Rank	Player	Club	Tally	Total	Matches	Average
1	Kevin Farrell	Carrickshock	1-23	26	3	8.66
2	Robbie Donnelly	Thomastown	0-25	25	3	8.33
2	Cian O'Donoghue	Tullogher-Rosbercon	0-25	25	4	6.25
3	Alan Murphy	Glenmore	0-21	21	3	7.00
4	Shane Walsh	Tullaroan	1-16	19	2	9.50
4	Paul Holden	Young Irelands	1-16	19	2	9.50
5	Shane Brennan	Conahy Shamrocks	0-17	17	2	8.50
6	Michael Brennan	St. Patrick's Ballyragget	0-16	16	3	5.33
7	Joe Brennan	St. Patrick's Ballyragget	1-11	14	3	4.66
7	Rory Hickey	Lisdowney	1-11	14	2	7.00

Top scorers in a single game

Rank	Player	Club	Tally	Total	Opposition
1	Alan Murphy	Glenmore	0-13	13	St. Patrick's Ballyragget
2	Shane Walsh	Tullaroan	1-09	12	St. Lachtain's
2	Kevin Farrell	Carrickshock	1-09	12	Lisdowney
3	Paul Holden	Young Irelands	1-08	11	Conahy Shamrocks
4	Pádraig Walsh	Tullaroan	1-07	10	St. Lachtain's
4	Thomas Ryan	Graigue-Ballycallan	0-10	10	St. Lachtain's
4	Robbie Donnelly	Thomastown	0-10	10	Conahy Shamrocks
4	Shane Brennan	Conahy Shamrocks	0-10	10	Thomastown
5	Rory Hickey	Lisdowney	1-06	9	Young Irelands
5	Robbie Donnelly	Thomastown	0-09	9	Tullogher-Rosbercon
5	Kevin Farrell	Carrickshock	0-09	9	Tullaroan
