= 1949 Kilkenny Senior Hurling Championship =

Annual hurling competition season

- Dates: 8 May – 9 October 1949
- Teams: 8
- Champions: Graigue (1st title); John Keane (captain)
- Runners-up: Tullaroan; Tom Walton (captain)

Tournament statistics
- Matches played: 7
- Goals scored: 42 (6 per match)
- Points scored: 103 (14.71 per match)

The 1949 Kilkenny Senior Hurling Championship was the 55th staging of the Kilkenny Senior Hurling Championship since its establishment by the Kilkenny County Board in 1887. The draw for the first round fixtures took place on 6 March 1949. The championship ran from 8 May to 9 October 1949.

Tullaroan were the defending champions.

The final was played on 9 October 1949 at Nowlan Park in Kilkenny, between first-time finalists Graigue and Tullaroan. Graigue won the match by 3–12 to 2–14 to claim their first ever championship title.

== Team changes ==
=== To Championship ===
Promoted from the Kilkenny Junior Hurling Championship

- Bennettsbridge

== Results ==
=== First round ===
8 May 1949 First round	Tullaroan	6-14 - 1-02	Dicksboro	Nowlan Park

22 May 1949 First round	Carrickshock	5-03 - 3-04	Bennettsbridge	Grennan Sportsfield

29 May 1949 First round	Mooncoin	4-07 - 1-03	Thomastown	John Locke Park

12 June 1949 First round	Éire Óg	2-06 - 3-05	Graigue	Grennan Sportsfield

=== Semi-finals ===
28 August 1949 Semi-final	Graigue	2-10 - 3-04	Mooncoin	Nowlan Park

11 September 1949 Semi-final	Tullaroan	5-12 - 2-06	Carrickshock	Nowlan Park

=== Final ===
9 October 1949 Final	Graigue	3-13 - 2-14	Tullaroan	Nowlan Park
