= 1994 Kilkenny Senior Hurling Championship =

Annual hurling competition season

- Dates: 23 July 1994 – 9 October 1994
- Teams: 12
- Sponsor: St. Canice's Credit Union
- Champions: Tullaroan (20th title); Derek Gaffney (captain)
- Runners-up: Dicksboro; John Marnell (captain)
- Relegated: Mullinavat

Tournament statistics
- Matches played: 16
- Goals scored: 32 (2 per match)
- Points scored: 403 (25.19 per match)

The 1994 Kilkenny Senior Hurling Championship was the 100th staging of the Kilkenny Senior Hurling Championship since its establishment by the Kilkenny County Board since 1887. The championship began on 23 July 1994 and ended on 9 October 1994.

Dicksboro entered the championship as the defending champions. Mullinavat were relegated from the championship after five seasons in the top flight.

On 9 October 1994, Tullaroan won the championship after a 1–06 to 0–06 defeat of Dicksboro in the final. It was their 20th championship title overall and their first title since 1958. It remains their last championship title.

== Team changes ==
=== To Championship ===
Promoted from the Kilkenny Intermediate Hurling Championship

- John Locke's

=== From Championship ===
Relegated to the Kilkenny Intermediate Hurling Championship

- Clara

== Results ==
=== First round ===
23 July 1994 First round	Ballyhale Shamrocks	3-15 - 1-09	Young Irelands	Nowlan Park, Kilkenny
	T Shefflin 2-3, J Shefflin 0-5, G Fennelly 0-4, D Fennelly 1-0, L Fennelly 0-2, J Lawlor 0-1.		J Fitzgerald 1-0, M Byrne 0-2, C Carter 0-2, C Fitzgerald 0-1, D O'Neill 0-1, J Carey 0-1, P O'Neill 0-1, DJ Carey 0-1.	Referee: P Hayes (Graigue-Ballycallan)

30 July 1994 First round	John Locke's	1-17 - 1-17	St. Martin's	Nowlan Park, Kilkenny
	K Coffey 1-2, D Roche 0-5, P Comerford 0-2, D Maher 0-2, D Lynch 0-2, J Lynch 0-1, John Power 0-1, Jim Power 0-1, S Donovan 0-1.		J Morrissey 0-10, N Moloney 1-1, J Brennan 0-2, J Dowling 0-2, J Morrissey 0-1, D Comerford 0-1.	Referee: J Guinan (Lisdowney)

31 July 1994 First round	Fenians	0-14 - 1-09	Erin's Own	Páirc Lachtáin, Freshford
	PJ Delaney 0-7, Brian Ryan 0-2, B Purcell 0-2, M Walsh 0-1, Brendan Ryan 0-1, M Phelan 0-1.		J Brennan 0-5, C Brennan 1-1, E Brennan 0-2, B Young 0-1.

1 August 1994 First round	Graigue-Ballycallan	0-21 - 1-13	Mullinavat	John Locke Park, Callan
	A Ronan 0-12, D Byrne 0-5, J Teehan 0-2, J Young 0-1, D Cleere 0-1.		M Dunphy 0-9, Jimmy O'Keeffe 1-0, Jack O'Keeffe 0-1, W Carroll 0-1, M Law 0-1, R Carroll 0-1.

12 August 1994 First round replay	John Locke's	1-10 - 3-09	St. Martin's	Nowlan Park, Kilkenny
	D Roche 1-6, J Power 0-2, T Comerford 0-1, D Maher 0-1.		J Morrissey 1-4, N Moloney 1-1, D Comerford 1-0, J Dooley 0-2, J Morrissey 0-1, J Brennan 0-1.	Referee: J Guinan (Lisdowney)

=== Relegation play-offs ===
27 August 1994 Semi-final	Erin's Own	1-11 - 0-08	Mullinavat	John Locke Park, Callan
	J Brennan 1-4, B Young 0-3, K Brennan 0-2, J Buggy 0-1, E Brennan 0-1.		M Dunphy 0-7, J O'Keeffe 0-1.	Referee: P Hayes (Graigue-Ballycallan)

4 September 1994 Semi-final	Young Irelands	2-11 - 0-09	John Locke's

17 September 1994 Final	John Locke's	1-16 - 2-08	Mullinavat	Hugginstown
	D Roche 0-7, S Donovan 1-2, K Coffey 0-3, J Power 0-2, D Egan 0-1, D Lynh 0-1.		M Dunphy 1-7, R Carroll 1-0, S Walsh 0-1.	Referee: P Neary (James Stephens)

=== Quarter-finals ===
12 August 1994 Quarter-final	James Stephens	1-13 - 2-12	Fenians	St. Patrick's Park, Ballyragget
	R Minogue 0-6, N Kelly 1-1, P Barry 0-2, M Walsh 0-2, Tobias White 0-1, B McEvoy 0-1.		PJ Delaney 1-3, B Purcell 1-1, S Grehan 0-3, Brendan Ryan 0-2, Brian Ryan 0-1, M Walsh 0-1, J Brennan 0-1.

13 August 1994 Quarter-final	Tullaroan	1-14 - 0-10	Graigue-Ballycallan	Nowlan Park, Kilkenny
	D Gaffney 0-5, P Doheny 1-0, S Teehan 0-2, D Walsh 0-2, J Walton 0-2, L Keoghan 0-1, S Dunne 0-1, M Maher 0-1.		A Ronan 0-5, J Young 0-2, J Teehan 0-1, D Byrne 0-1, J Brennan 0-1.

14 August 1994 Quarter-final	Glenmore	2-18 - 2-15	Ballyhale Shamrocks	Mullinavat
	K Heffernan, C Heffernan 1-0, D Mullally 1-0, D Heffernan 0-1, P Barron 0-1, J Murphy 0-1.		G Fennelly 0-11, L Fennelly 1-2, D Fennelly 1-0, J Shefflin 0-2.

27 August 1994 Quarter-final	Dicksboro	0-16 - 0-10	St. Martin's	Nowlan Park, Kilkenny
	T Bawle 0-6, S Prendergast 0-4, S Moore 0-2, T Henderson 0-2, S Morrissey 0-1, M Kennedy 0-1.		E Morrissey 0-3, N Moloney 0-3, J Dooley 0-2, L Dowling 0-1, D Dooley 0-1.	Referee: D Duggan (Mullinavat)

=== Semi-finals ===
25 September 1994 Semi-final	Dicksboro	2-10 - 1-12	Glenmore	Nowlan Park, Kilkenny
	T Bawle 1-2, D O'Neill 0-5, J Treacy 1-0, S Prendergast 0-2, S Morrissey 0-1.		R Heffernan 0-6, S Dollard 1-2, D Mullally 0-2, J Murphy 0-1, M Phelan 0-1.	Referee: E Mahon (Cloneen)

25 September 1994 Semi-final	Fenians	1-14 - 1-14	Tullaroan	Nowlan Park, Kilkenny
	PJ Delaney 1-9, M Walsh 0-3, B Ryan 0-2.		D Gaffney 0-9, S Teehan 1-2, D Walsh 0-2, B Teehan 0-1.	Referee: D Duggan (Mullinavat)

1 October 1994 Semi-final replay	Fenians	0-12 - 0-16	Tullaroan	Nowlan Park, Kilkenny
	Brendan Ryan 0-5, E Behan 0-2, B Purcell 0-2, Brian Ryan 0-1, PJ Delaney 0-1, S Grehan 0-1.		D Gaffney 0-10, B Teehan 0-2, S Teehan 0-1, P Doheny 0-1, S Dunne 0-1, P Fennelly 0-1.	Referee: D Duggan (Mullinavat)

=== Final ===
9 October 1994 Final	Tullaroan	1-06 - 0-06	Dicksboro	Nowlan Park, Kilkenny
	D Gaffney 0-4, B Teehan 1-0, D Walsh 0-1, L Keoghan 0-1.		D O'Neill 0-2, J Treacy 0-1, S Prendergast 0-1, S Morrissey 0-1, T Ball 0-1.
