= 1940 Kilkenny Senior Hurling Championship =

Annual hurling competition season

- Champions: Carrickshock (2nd title); Bob Aylward (captain)
- Runners-up: Mullinavat; Pat Aylward (captain)

The 1940 Kilkenny Senior Hurling Championship was the 46th staging of the Kilkenny Senior Hurling Championship since its establishment by the Kilkenny County Board in 1887.

Éire Óg were the defending champions.

The final was played on 13 October 1940 at Nowlan Park in Kilkenny, between Carrickshock and first-time finalists Mullinavat. Carrickshock won the match by 1–04 to 1–02 to claim their third championship title overall and a first title in two years.

== Results ==
=== Semi-finals ===
18 August 1940 Semi-final replay	Mullinavat	5-01 - 3-07	Ballyline	Nowlan Park

15 September 1940 Semi-final replay	Mullinavat	2-08 - 1-03	Ballyline	Nowlan Park

=== Final ===
13 October 1940 Final	Carrickshock	1-04 - 1-02	Mullinavat	Nowlan Park
