= Jack Egan (Kilkenny hurler) =

Irish hurler

Personal information
- Native name: Seán Mac Aogáin (Irish)
- Born: 21 January 1921 Threecastles, County Kilkenny, Ireland
- Died: 2 December 1994 (aged 73) Kilkenny, Ireland
- Occupation: Woollen mills worker
- Height: 5 ft 11 in (180 cm)

Sport
- Sport: Hurling
- Position: Goalkeeper
Clubs
- Years: Club
- Threecastles; Tullaroan; Éire Óg; Cootehill
Club titles
- Kilkenny titles: 1
Inter-county
- Years: County
- 1946-1947: Kilkenny
Inter-county titles
- Leinster titles: 1
- All-Irelands: 1
- NHL: 0

John Egan (21 January 1921 - 2 December 1994) was an Irish hurler. His league and championship career with the Kilkenny senior hurling team lasted just one season.

== Biography ==
Egan was born in Threecastles, County Kilkenny in 1921, son of Martin Egan who was a lifelong administrator with the North Kilkenny GAA Board. He quickly developed a love for hurling and was a member of the Threecastles team that won the Kilkenny Junior Championship in 1940.

Around this time Egan took up employment with Kilkenny Woollen Mills and played with them in the Kilkenny Junior Championship. He played with the Kilkenny junior hurling team which won the All-Ireland Championship in 1946 before graduating to the senior team. On 7 September 1947, Egan won an All-Ireland Championship medal at senior level, as understudy to Jim Donegan, following a one-point defeat of Cork in the final.

As there was no parish rule for club hurling at the time, Egan joined the Tullaroan club with whom he won a Kilkenny Senior Championship medal in 1948. Soon after that victory, he joined the Éire Óg club and remained a member until the club disbanded in the early 1960s. Egan completed his medal collection in 1965 when he lined out with Cootehill who won the Cavan Senior Championship.

Egan died in Kilkenny on 2 December 1994.

== Honours ==
Threecastles

- Kilkenny Junior Hurling Championship (1): 1940

Tullaroan

- Kilkenny Senior Hurling Championship (1): 1948

Cootehill

- Cavan Senior Football Championship (1): 1965

Kilkenny

- All-Ireland Senior Hurling Championship (1): 1947
- Leinster Senior Hurling Championship (1): 1947
- All-Ireland Junior Hurling Championship (1): 1946
- Leinster Junior Hurling Championship (1): 1946
