= 1941 Kilkenny Senior Hurling Championship =

Annual hurling competition season

- Champions: Carrickshock (4th title)
- Runners-up: Éire Óg

The 1941 Kilkenny Senior Hurling Championship was the 47th staging of the Kilkenny Senior Hurling Championship since its establishment by the Kilkenny County Board in 1887.

Carrickshock were the defending champions.

The final was played on 13 December 1941 at Nowlan Park in Kilkenny, between Carrickshock and Éire Óg, in what was their third meeting in the final in four years. Carrickshock won the match by 4–05 to 3–07 to claim their fourth championship title overall and a second consecutive title.

== Results ==
=== Semi-finals ===
30 November 1941 Semi-final	Éire Óg	5-08 - 0-01	Dicksboro	Nowlan Park

30 November 1941 Semi-final	Carrickshock	2-06 - 1-06	Threecastles	Nowlan Park

=== Final ===
13 December 1941 Final	Carrickshock	4-05 - 3-07	Éire Óg	Nowlan Park
