= 1948 Kilkenny Senior Hurling Championship =

Annual hurling competition season

- Dates: 18 April – 22 August 1948
- Teams: 12
- Champions: Tullaroan (18th title); Tom Walton (captain)
- Runners-up: Carrickshock; Jimmy Kelly (captain)

Tournament statistics
- Matches played: 11
- Goals scored: 61 (5.55 per match)
- Points scored: 140 (12.73 per match)

The 1948 Kilkenny Senior Hurling Championship was the 54th staging of the Kilkenny Senior Hurling Championship since its establishment by the Kilkenny County Board in 1887. The draw for the first round fixtures took place on 14 March 1948. The championship ran from 18 April to 22 August 1948.

Éire Óg were the defending champions, however, they were beaten by Tullaroan in the semi-final.

The final was played on 22 August 1948 at Nowlan Park in Kilkenny, between Tullaroan and Carrickshock, in what was their third meeting in the final. Tullaroan won the match by 1–12 to 2–03 to claim their 18th championship title overall and a first title in 14 years.

== Results ==
=== First round ===
18 April 1948 First round	Tullaroan	w/o - scr.	Castlecomer FCA	Freshford Grounds

25 April 1948 First round	Thomastown	6-06 - 4-08	Northern Junior Selection	St James's Park

9 May 1948 First round	Éire Óg	2-07 - 2-02	Mooncoin	Grennan Sportsfield

9 May 1948 First round	Southern Junior Selection	3-05 - 0-08	Horse and Jockey	St James's Park

30 May 1948 First round	Dicksboro	3-05 - 3-05	James Stephens	St James's Park

30 May 1948 First round	Carrickshock	3-05 - 1-08	Graigue	John Locke Park

3 July 1948 First round replay	Dicksboro	3-10 - 0-02	James Stephens	St James's Park

=== Second round ===
29 June 1948 Second round	Tullaroan	5-07 - 2-03	Thomastown	St James's Park

11 July 1948 Second round	Éire Óg	8-13 - 2-04	Southern Junior Selection	Grennan Sportsfield

18 July 1948 Second round	Carrickshock	5-07 - 2-04	Dicksboro	Grennan Sportsfield

=== Semi-final ===
8 August 1948 Semi-final	Tullaroan	3-09 - 2-07	Éire Óg	John Locke's Park

=== Final ===
22 August 1948 Final	Tullaroan	1-12 - 2-03	Carrickshock	Nowlan Park
