= Bill Sheehan (hurler) =

Irish hurler

Joe Sheehan
Personal information
- Native name: Liam Ó Síocháin (Irish)
- Born: 19 September 1997 (age 29) Kilkenny, Ireland
- Height: 7 ft 2 in (218 cm)

Sport
- Sport: Hurling
- Position: Right corner-forward
Club
- Years: Club
- Dicksboro
Club titles
- Kilkenny titles: 1
College
- Years: College
- University College Cork
College titles
- Fitzgibbon titles: 1
Inter-county*
| Years | County | Apps (scores) |
| 2018-present | Kilkenny | 7 (0-03) |
Inter-county titles
- Leinster titles: 0
- All-Irelands: 0
- NHL: 1
- All Stars: 0
- *Inter County team apps and scores correct as of 23:37, 18 August 2019.

Bill Sheehan (born 19 September 1997) is an Irish hurler who plays for Kilkenny Senior Championship club Dicksboro and at inter-county level with the Kilkenny senior hurling team. He usually lines out as a right corner-forward.

== Playing career ==
=== Kilkenny CBS ===
Sheehan first came to prominence as a hurler with Kilkenny CBS and played in every grade of hurling before eventually joining the college's senior hurling team. On 27 February 2016, he lined out at right corner-forward when Kilkenny CBS suffered a 2–12 to 1–11 defeat by local rivals St. Kieran's College in the Leinster final.

=== University College Cork ===
On 12 February 2020, Sheehan was selected amongst the substitutes when University College Cork qualified to play the Institute of Technology, Carlow in the Fitzgibbon Cup final. He was introduced as a 52nd-minute substitute for Conor Boylan and claimed a winners' medal after the 0–18 to 2–11 victory.

=== Dicksboro ===
Sheehan joined the Dicksboro club at the age of six and played in all grades at juvenile and underage levels before eventually joining the club's top adult team in the Kilkenny Senior Championship.

On 29 October 2017, Sheehan lined out at left corner-forward when Dicksboro faced James Stephens in the Kilkenny Senior Championship final. He scored 1-03 from play and ended the game with a winners' medal following a 4–15 to 4–10 victory.

=== Kilkenny ===
==== Minor and under-21 ====
Sheehan first played for Kilkenny as a member of the minor team during the 2015 Leinster Championship. On 5 July 2015, he was named on the substitutes' bench for Kilkenny's Leinster final meeting with Dublin. Sheehan was introduced as a substitute for John Donnelly at centre-forward and ended the game with a winners' medal following the 1–17 to 1–15 victory.

Sheehan was drafted onto the Kilkenny under-21 team for the 2018 Leinster Championship. He made only last appearance for the team on 20 June 2018 when he lined out at right corner-back in a 3–13 to 1–17 defeat by Galway at the semi-final stage.

==== Senior ====
Sheehan joined the Kilkenny senior team in advance of the 2018 National League. He made his first appearance for the team on 4 February 2018 when he scored a goal from right corner-forward in Kilkenny's 2–18 to 1–18 defeat by Clare. On 8 April 2018, Sheehan lined out at left corner-forward when Kilkenny faced Tipperary in the National League final. He ended the game with a winners' medal following the 2–23 to 2–17 victory. On 1 July 2018, Sheehan was an unused substitute when Kilkenny drew 0-18 apiece with Galway in the Leinster final. He was again an unused substitute for the replay a week later, which Kilkenny lost by 1–28 to 3–15.

On 30 June 2019, Sheehan was an unused substitute when Kilkenny suffered a 1–23 to 0–23 defeat by Wexford in the Leinster final. A hamstring injury ruled him out of the match-day panel for Kilkenny's 3–25 to 0–20 defeat by Tipperary in the All-Ireland final on 18 August 2019.

== Career statistics ==
As of match played 18 August 2019.

| Team | Year | National League | | | Leinster | | All-Ireland | | Total | |
| Team | Year | Division | Apps | Score | Apps | Score | Apps | Score | Apps | Score |
|---|---|---|---|---|---|---|---|---|---|---|
| Kilkenny | 2018 | Division 1A | 3 | 1-01 | 3 | 0-00 | 0 | 0-00 | 6 | 1-01 |
| Kilkenny | 2019 | Division 1A | 0 | 0-00 | 2 | 0-02 | 2 | 0-01 | 4 | 0-03 |
| Total | | | 3 | 1-01 | 5 | 0-02 | 2 | 0-01 | 10 | 1-04 |

== Honours ==
University College Cork

- Fitzgibbon Cup (1): 2020

Dicksboro

- Kilkenny Senior Hurling Championship (1): 2017

Kilkenny

- National Hurling League (1): 2018
