= Evan Cody =

Irish hurler

Personal information
- Native name: Éimhín Mac Oda (Irish)
- Born: 10 November 1995 (age 30) Kilkenny, Ireland
- Occupation: Secondary school teacher
- Height: 6 ft 0 in (183 cm)

Sport
- Sport: Hurling
- Position: Left corner-back
Club
- Years: Club
- Dicksboro
Club titles
- Kilkenny titles: 1
College
- Years: College
- University of Limerick
College titles
- Fitzgibbon titles: 0
Inter-county*
Years	County	Apps (scores)
2016-2017; 2022-	Kilkenny	0 (0-00)
Inter-county titles
- Leinster titles: 0
- All-Irelands: 0
- NHL: 0
- All Stars: 0
- *Inter County team apps and scores correct as of 20:41, 13 February 2022.

Evan Cody (born 10 November 1995) is an Irish hurler who plays for club side Dicksboro and at inter-county level with the Kilkenny senior hurling team. He usually lines out as a defender.

== Career ==
Cody first played at juvenile and underage levels with the Dicksboro club. As a schoolboy with CBS Kilkenny, he won consecutive Leinster Colleges Championships. At club level he won a Kilkenny SHC title in 2017. Cody first appeared on the inter-county scene as a member of the Kilkenny minor hurling team in 2013 before later joining the under-21 side. He joined the Kilkenny senior hurling team in 2016 for the pre-season Walsh Cup, however, after being released from the panel later that season he won an All-Ireland title with the Kilkenny intermediate team. Cody spent the following few seasons on and off the senior team.

== Honours ==
CBS Kilkenny

- Leinster Colleges Senior Hurling Championship: 2013, 2014

Dicksboro

- Kilkenny Senior Hurling Championship: 2017

Kilkenny

- All-Ireland Intermediate Hurling Championship: 2016
- Leinster Intermediate Hurling Championship: 2016
- Leinster Minor Hurling Championship: 2013
