= 1938 Kilkenny Senior Hurling Championship =

Annual hurling competition season

- Dates: 12 June – 16 October 1938
- Teams: 5
- Champions: Carrickshock (2nd title); Bob Aylward (captain)
- Runners-up: Éire Óg; Seánie O'Brien (captain)

Tournament statistics
- Matches played: 4
- Goals scored: 23 (5.75 per match)
- Points scored: 42 (10.5 per match)

The 1938 Kilkenny Senior Hurling Championship was the 44th staging of the Kilkenny Senior Hurling Championship since its establishment by the Kilkenny County Board in 1887. The draw for the opening round fixtures took place on 13 February 1938. The championship ran from 12 June to 16 October 1938.

James Stephens were the defending champions, however, they were beaten by Éire Óg in the semi-final.

The final was played on 16 October 1938 at Nowlan Park in Kilkenny, between Carrickshock and first-time finalists Éire Óg. Carrickshock won the match by 2–05 to 1–05 to claim their fifth championship title overall and a first title in seven years.

== Results ==
=== First round ===
| 12 June 1938 First round | James Stephens | 5-07 - 1-03 | Dicksboro | Nowlan Park |

| 19 June 1938 First round | Tullaroan | 3-05 - 4-10 | Carrickshock | Nowlan Park |

=== Semi-final ===
| 28 August 1938 Semi-final | Éire Óg | 4-03 - 3-04 | James Stephens | Nowlan Park |

- Carrickshock received a bye in this round.

=== Final ===
| 16 October 1938 Final | Carrickshock | 2-05 - 1-05 | Éire Óg | Nowlan Park |
