= Ramie (disambiguation) =

Ramie is a type of fibre crop native to eastern Asia derived from the species Boehmeria nivea, also called ramie.

Ramie may also refer to:

- Ramie Dowling (1921–2004), an Irish sportsperson
- Ramie Leahy, an Irish artist
- Ramie moth (Arcte coerula), a species of moth

== See also ==
- Raymond
