= Osage Casino =

Casino hotels in Osage County, Oklahoma, US

Osage Casino Hotel-Ponca City
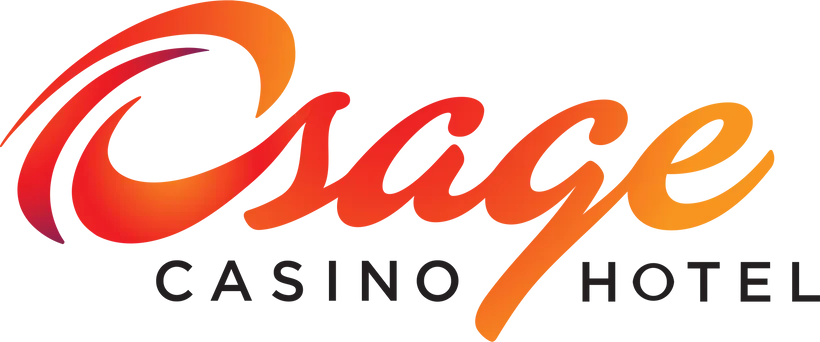

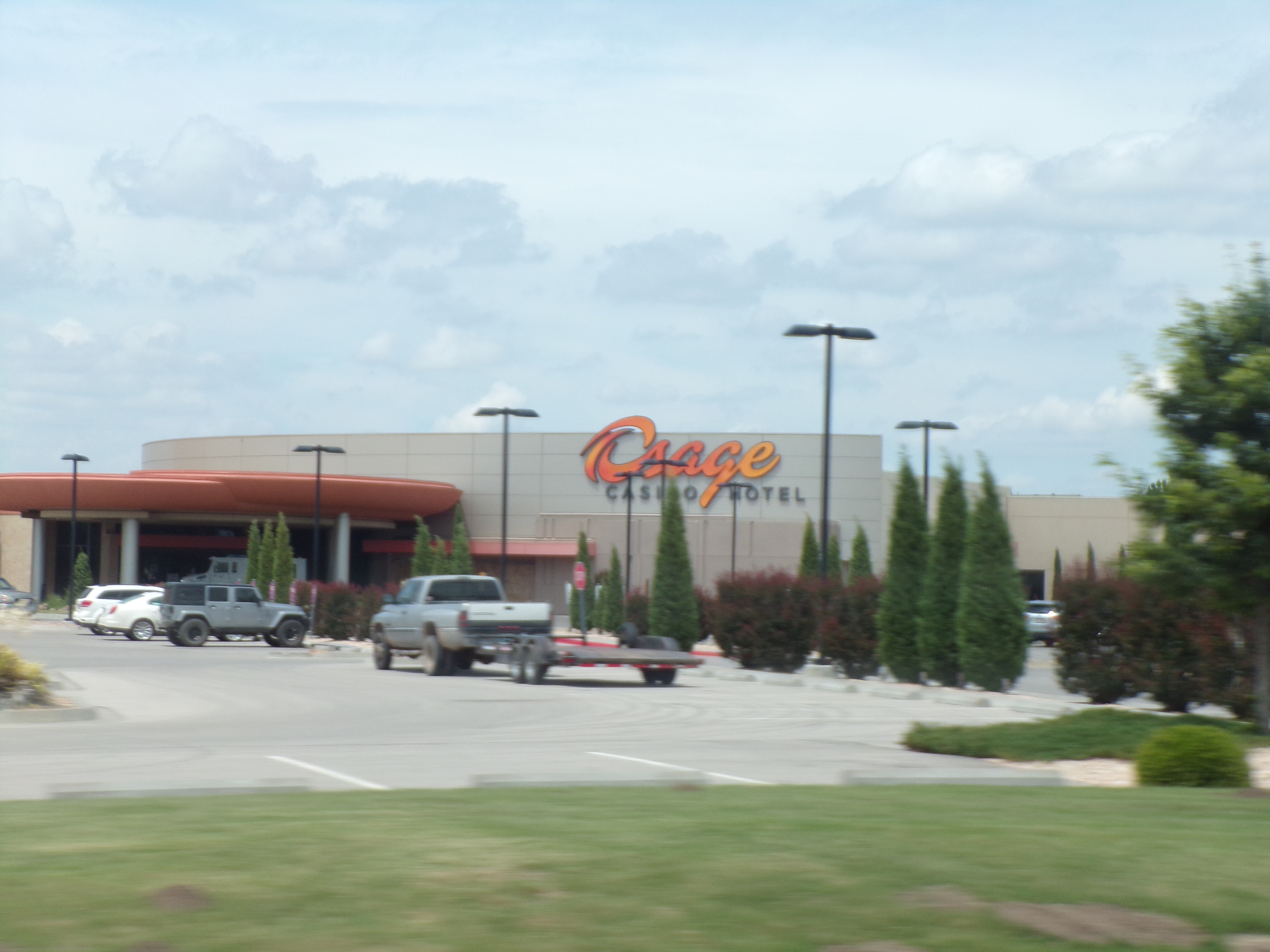
- Osage Casino Hotel in Ponca City
- Interactive map of Osage Casino Hotel-Ponca City
- Location: Ponca City, Oklahoma; 64464 US Hwy 60, Ponca City, Oklahoma 74604
- Opened: 2007
- No. of rooms: 48
- Gaming space: 8,620 sq ft (801 m^{2})
- Notable restaurants: Salted Fork
- Casino type: Land-based
- Owner: Osage Nation
- Architect: Marnell
- Previous names: Osage Casino
- Website: www.osagecasinos.com

The Osage Nation operates seven casinos in Oklahoma, under the name Osage Casinos. The 25th largest tribe in the United States, the people are based on their reservation encompassing Osage County, Oklahoma. It is larger than the U.S. states of Delaware and Rhode Island.

== History ==
The Osage originally named their casino business as the Osage Million Dollar Elm, changing it to Osage Casino in 2011. The name referred to the history of the first mineral auctions conducted in 1922 for the Osage Tribe. They took place outside, under what was called the "Million Dollar Elm" tree, in Pawhuska, Oklahoma. More than $1 million worth of Osage oil leases were auctioned there. Reporters and magazine writers coined the term to convey the excitement and scale of the auction when founders of the world's greatest oil companies--Frank Phillips and E.W. Marland—came in person to bid on the Osage oil and natural gas leases.

After eight years as CEO of Osage Casinos, Byron Bighorse resigned in 2023 and was replaced by Kimberly Pearson.

=== Osage Casino-Hominy ===
Osage Casino-Hominy, located four miles north of Hominy, Oklahoma, opened in 2001 under Osage Nation Gaming. The casino was remodeled and expanded in 2005 to allow for additional electronic gaming devices as well as table games.

=== Osage Casino-Pawhuska ===
Osage Casino, Pawhuska, located at 15th Street and Highway 99 east of Pawhuska, Oklahoma, began operation in June 2003.

=== Osage Casino-Sand Springs ===
Osage Casino-Sand Springs reopened in June 2012 after a total renovation to improve air quality, gaming and comfort for guests. First opened in July 2004, the 25,000-square-foot casino offers guests more than 600 state-of-the-art electronic gaming devices, a Player's Club, food court, bar and lounge, gift shop and parking for 500 vehicles. The casino is located off exit 129th Street, Sand Springs, Oklahoma, 1.5 miles north of Highway 51/64 northwest of Sand Springs.

=== Osage Casino-Tulsa ===
Osage Casino-Tulsa is the gaming and entertainment venue that is closest to downtown Tulsa, Oklahoma.

=== Osage Casino-Bartlesville ===
Osage Casino, Bartlesville, is located five miles west of Bartlesville, Oklahoma, off County Road 2145; it opened in March 2007.

=== Osage Casino Hotel-Skiatook ===
Osage Casinos held a groundbreaking ceremony Sept. 26, 2012, to build a 33-room hotel, conference center, convenience store and new 78,000 square-foot casino. Osage Casino Hotel, Skiatook, Oklahoma, 5591 West Rogers Boulevard, opened December 9, 2013.

=== Osage Casino Hotel-Ponca City ===
Osage Casino Hotel, Ponca City, Oklahoma, officially reopened December 23, 2013, with a new gaming floor, hotel, restaurant and convenience store. The casino is open 24 hours a day, seven days a week. The casino is located off Highway 60 and is the gaming center closest to Ponca City.

Osage Casino is a Native American casino in Ponca City, Oklahoma owned and operated by the Osage Nation. Originally opened Dec. 23, 2013, the facility features 345 gaming machines.

Osage Casino Hotel- Osage Beach, Missouri

In 2021, Osage Casino announced plans to build a casino near the Osage River in Osage Beach, Missouri. Joint resolution is required to pass before construction can begin.

== See also ==
- Native American gaming
- Detailed description of oil lease auctions under the "Million Dollar Elm" tree
