= Liam Reidy =

Liam Reidy may refer to:

- Liam Reidy (hurler)
- Liam Reidy (footballer)
