= 1925 Kilkenny Senior Hurling Championship =

Annual hurling competition season

- Champions: Tullaroan (14th title)
- Runners-up: Dicksboro

The 1925 Kilkenny Senior Hurling Championship was the 31st staging of the Kilkenny Senior Hurling Championship since its establishment by the Kilkenny County Board.

On 27 September 1925, Tullaroan won the championship after a 3–04 to 3–03 defeat of Dicksboro in the final. It was their 14th championship title overall and their second title in succession.

== Results ==
=== Final ===
27 September 1925 Final	Tullaroan	3-04 - 3-03	Dicksboro	St. James's Park
