= 1942 Kilkenny Senior Hurling Championship =

Annual hurling competition season

- Champions: Carrickshock (5th title); Bob Aylward (captain)
- Runners-up: Threecastles; Paddy Phelan (captain)

The 1942 Kilkenny Senior Hurling Championship was the 48th staging of the Kilkenny Senior Hurling Championship since its establishment by the Kilkenny County Board in 1887.

Carrickshock were the defending champions.

The final was played on 26 July 1942 at Nowlan Park in Kilkenny, between Carrickshock and Threecastles, in what was their first ever meeting in the final. Carrickshock won the match by 3–02 to 2–03 to claim their fifth championship title overall and a third consecutive title.

== Results ==
=== Semi-finals ===
12 July 1942 Semi-final	Threecastles	4-08 - 3-02	Dicksboro	Nowlan Park

19 July 1942 Semi-final	Carrickshock	4-05 - 2-01	Ballyline	Nowlan Park

=== Final ===
26 July 1942 Final	Carrickshock	3-02 - 2-03	Threecastles	Nowlan Park
