= 1897 Kilkenny Senior Hurling Championship =

Annual hurling competition season

- Champions: Tullaroan (4th title); James Grace (captain)
- Runners-up: Mooncoin; Ned Hennessy (captain)

The 1897 Kilkenny Senior Hurling Championship was the ninth staging of the Kilkenny Senior Hurling Championship since its establishment by the Kilkenny County Board.

On 10 July 1898, Tullaroan won the championship after a 3–11 to 2–01 defeat of Mooncoin in the final. This was their fourth championship title over all and their first in two championship seasons.

== Results ==
=== Final ===
10 July 1898 Final	Tullaroan	3-11 - 2-01	Mooncoin	Palmerstown Gaelic Field
