= 1924 Kilkenny Senior Hurling Championship =

Annual hurling competition season

- Champions: Tullaroan (13th title)
- Runners-up: Clomanto

The 1924 Kilkenny Senior Hurling Championship was the 30th staging of the Kilkenny Senior Hurling Championship since its establishment by the Kilkenny County Board.

On 22 March 1925, Tullaroan won the championship after a 4–04 to 2–02 defeat of Clomanto in the final. It was their 13th championship title overall and their first title since 1915.

== Results ==
=== Final ===
22 March 1925 Final	Tullaroan	4-04 - 2-02	Clomanto	St. James's Park
