= 1943 Kilkenny Senior Hurling Championship =

Annual hurling competition season

- Champions: Carrickshock (6th title); Jimmy Walsh (captain)
- Runners-up: Mullinavat

The 1943 Kilkenny Senior Hurling Championship was the 49th staging of the Kilkenny Senior Hurling Championship since its establishment by the Kilkenny County Board in 1887.

Carrickshock were the defending champions.

The final was played on 8 August 1943 at Nowlan Park in Kilkenny, between Carrickshock and Mullinavat, in what was their second meeting in the final in four years. Carrickshock won the match by 3–06 to 1–03 to claim their sixth championship title overall and a record-breaking fourth consecutive title.

== Results ==
=== Semi-finals ===
18 July 1943 Semi-final	Mullinavat	5-05 - 3-09	Éire Óg	Thomastown Grounds

18 July 1943 Semi-final	Carrickshock	9-12 - 5-06	Dicksboro	Thomastown Grounds

=== Final ===
8 August 1943 Final	Carrickshock	3-06 - 1-03	Mullinavat	Nowlan Park, Kilkenny
