= Millea =

Millea is a surname. Notable people with the surname include:

- Jim Millea (born 1958), English actor who plays Neville Ashworth in the soap opera Hollyoaks
- Joe Millea (born 1941), retired Irish sportsperson
