= 1933 Kilkenny Senior Hurling Championship =

Annual hurling competition season

- Champions: Tullaroan (16th title); Lory Meagher (captain)
- Runners-up: Carrickshock; Willie Dalton (captain)

The 1933 Kilkenny Senior Hurling Championship was the 39th staging of the Kilkenny Senior Hurling Championship since its establishment by the Kilkenny County Board.

On 1 October 1933, Tullaroan won the championship after a 6–05 to 5–04 defeat of Carrickshock in the final. It was their 16th championship title overall and their first title in three championship seasons.

== Results ==
=== Final ===
| 1 October 1933 Final | Tullaroan | 6-05 - 5-04 | Carrickshock | Nowlan Park, Kilkenny |
