= Jack Egan =

Jack Egan may refer to:

- Jack Egan (boxer) (1878–1950), American boxer
- Johnny Egan (Australian footballer) (born 1898), Australian footballer
- Jack Egan (Cork hurler) (1904–1984), Irish hurler
- Jack Egan (Kilkenny hurler) (1921–1994), Irish hurler
- Jack Egan (footballer) (born 1998), English footballer
- John Egan (basketball) (born 1940s), American basketball guard
- Jack Egan (discus thrower) (born 1936), American discus thrower, 1958 All-American for the USC Trojans track and field team

== See also ==
- John Egan (disambiguation)
