= 1902 Kilkenny Senior Hurling Championship =

Annual hurling competition season

- Champions: Tullaroan (7th title); Pat Maher (captain)
- Runners-up: Mooncoin; Pat Fielding (captain)

The 1902 Kilkenny Senior Hurling Championship was the 14th staging of the Kilkenny Senior Hurling Championship since its establishment by the Kilkenny County Board.

On 17 May 1903, Tullaroan won the championship after a 3–16 to 0–01 defeat of Mooncoin in the final. This was their seventh championship title overall and their second title in succession.

== Results ==
=== Final ===
| 17 May 1903 Final | Tullaroan | 3-16 - 0-01 | Mooncoin | Asylum Lane Grounds |
