= 1899 Kilkenny Senior Hurling Championship =

Annual hurling competition season

- Champions: Tullaroan (1st title); James Walsh (captain)
- Runners-up: Young Irelands

The 1899 Kilkenny Senior Hurling Championship was the 11th staging of the Kilkenny Senior Hurling Championship since its establishment by the Kilkenny County Board.

Tullaroan won the championship after a 3–06 to 1–05 defeat of Young Irelands in the final. This was their fifth championship title overall and their first in two championship seasons.
