= 1930 Kilkenny Senior Hurling Championship =

Annual hurling competition season

- Champions: Tullaroan (15th title); Dick Grace (captain)
- Runners-up: Urlingford

The 1930 Kilkenny Senior Hurling Championship was the 36th staging of the Kilkenny Senior Hurling Championship since its establishment by the Kilkenny County Board.

On 12 October 1930, Tullaroan won the championship after a 4–04 to 0–03 defeat of first-time finalists Urlingford in the final. It was their 15th championship title overall and their first title in five championship seasons.

== Results ==
=== Semi-finals ===
| 17 August 1930 Semi-final | Urlingford | w/o - scr. | James Stephens |

| 14 September 1930 Semi-final | Tullaroan | 4-05 - 0-03 | Mooncoin | Nowlan Park |

=== Final ===
| 12 October 1930 Final | Tullaroan | 4-04 - 0-03 | Urlingford | Nowlan Park |
