= 1910 Kilkenny Senior Hurling Championship =

Annual hurling competition season

- Champions: Tullaroan (10th title); Sim Walton (captain)
- Runners-up: Piltown; John T. Power (captain)

The 1910 Kilkenny Senior Hurling Championship was the 22nd staging of the Kilkenny Senior Hurling Championship since its establishment by the Kilkenny County Board.

On 30 April 1911, Tullaroan won the championship after a 7–01 to 3–00 defeat of Piltown in the final. This was their 10th championship title overall and their first in three championship seasons.

== Results ==
=== Final ===
30 April 1911 Final	Tullaroan	7-01 - 3-00	Piltown	St. James's Park
