= 1926 Kilkenny Senior Hurling Championship =

Annual hurling competition season

- Champions: Dicksboro (2nd title)
- Runners-up: Mooncoin

The 1926 Kilkenny Senior Hurling Championship was the 32nd staging of the Kilkenny Senior Hurling Championship since its establishment by the Kilkenny County Board.

On 8 August 1926, Dicksboro won the championship after a 5–05 to 1–04 defeat of Mooncoin in the final. It was their second championship title overall and their first title in three championship seasons.

== Results ==
=== Final ===
8 August 1926 Final	Dicksboro	5-05 - 1-04	Mooncoin	St. James's Park
