= 1901 Kilkenny Senior Hurling Championship =

Annual hurling competition season

- Champions: Tullaroan (6th title); Jim Lalor (captain)
- Runners-up: Threecastles; Ned Hennessy (captain)

The 1901 Kilkenny Senior Hurling Championship was the 13th staging of the Kilkenny Senior Hurling Championship since its establishment by the Kilkenny County Board.

On 27 October 1901, Tullaroan won the championship after a 5–10 to 3–07 defeat of Threecastles in the final. This was their sixth championship title overall and their first in two championship seasons.

== Results ==
=== Final ===
27 October 1901 Final	Tullaroan	5-10 - 3-07	Threecastles	Freshford Gaelic Field
