= 1934 Kilkenny Senior Hurling Championship =

Annual hurling competition season

- Champions: Tullaroan (17th title); Lory Meagher (captain)
- Runners-up: Carrickshock; Willie Dalton (captain)

The 1934 Kilkenny Senior Hurling Championship was the 40th staging of the Kilkenny Senior Hurling Championship since its establishment by the Kilkenny County Board.

Tullaroan won the championship after a 6–06 to 1–05 defeat of Carrickshock in the final. It was their 17th championship title overall and their second title in succession. Carrickshock became the first team to lose three successive finals.

== Results ==
=== Final ===
14 October 1934 Final	Tullaroan	6-06 - 1-05	Carrickshock	Nowlan Park
