= Jim Hogan (Kilkenny hurler) =

Irish hurler

Personal information
- Native name: Séamus Ó hÓgáin (Irish)
- Born: 1928 Tullaroan, County Kilkenny, Ireland
- Died: 27 November 2010 (aged 81–82) Waterford, Ireland
- Occupation: Farmer

Sport
- Sport: Hurling
- Position: Right corner-back
Club
- Years: Club
- 1940s–1960s: Tullaroan
Club titles
- Kilkenny titles: 2
Inter-county
Years	County	Apps (scores)
1950–1957	Kilkenny	18 (0-00)
Inter-county titles
- Leinster titles: 2
- All-Irelands: 0
- NHL: 0

James Hogan (1928 – 27 November 2010) was an Irish hurler who played as a right corner-back for the Kilkenny senior team from 1950 until 1957.

Hogan made his first appearance for the team during the 1950 championship and became a regular member of the panel over the next decade. During that time he won one All-Ireland winner's medal as a non-playing substitute and two Leinster winner's medals.

At club level Hogan played with the Tullaroan club, winning two county club championship winners' medal.
