= 1907 Kilkenny Senior Hurling Championship =

Annual hurling competition season

- Champions: Tullaroan (9th title); Jer Doheny (captain)
- Runners-up: Mooncoin; Dick Walsh (captain)

The 1907 Kilkenny Senior Hurling Championship was the 19th staging of the Kilkenny Senior Hurling Championship since its establishment by the Kilkenny County Board.

On 2 August 1908, Tullaroan won the championship after a 2–06 to 1–03 defeat of Mooncoin in the final. This was their ninth championship title overall and their first in three championship seasons.

== Results ==
=== Final ===
2 August 1908 Final	Tullaroan	2-06 - 1-03	Mooncoin	St. James's Park
