= 1904 Kilkenny Senior Hurling Championship =

Annual hurling competition season

- Champions: Tullaroan (8th title); Jer Delaney (captain)
- Runners-up: Piltown; Jim Power (captain)

The 1904 Kilkenny Senior Hurling Championship was the 16th staging of the Kilkenny Senior Hurling Championship since its establishment by the Kilkenny County Board.

Tullaroan won the championship after a 6–14 to 1–06 defeat of Piltown in the final. This was their eighth championship title overall and their first title in two championship seasons.

== Results ==
=== Final ===
23 April 1905 Final	Tullaroan	6-14 - 1-06	Piltown	Asylum Lane Grounds
