= Marnell =

Marnell is a surname. Notable people with the surname include:

- Cat Marnell (born 1982), American writer and socialite
- John Marnell (born 1956), Irish hurler
- Lewis Marnell (1892–2013), Australian skateboarder
- Mark Marnell (1926–1992), Irish hurler

== See also ==
- Farnell
