= 1895 Kilkenny Senior Hurling Championship =

Annual hurling competition season

- Champions: Tullaroan (2nd title)
- Runners-up: Threecastles

The 1895 Kilkenny Senior Hurling Championship was the seventh staging of the Kilkenny Senior Hurling Championship since its establishment by the Kilkenny County Board.

Tullaroan won the championship after a 1–04 to 1–02 defeat of Callan in the final.
