= 1951 All-Ireland Junior Hurling Championship =

All Ireland Champions
- Winners: Kilkenny (3rd win)
- Captain: S. Hokey

All Ireland Runners-up
- Runners-up: London
- Captain: W. Brophy

Provincial Champions
- Munster: Tipperary
- Leinster: Kilkenny
- Ulster: Antrim
- Connacht: Galway

The 1951 All-Ireland Junior Hurling Championship was the 30th staging of the All-Ireland Junior Championship since its establishment by the Gaelic Athletic Association in 1912.

Cork entered the championship as the defending champions, however, they were beaten by Tipperary in the Munster first round.

The All-Ireland final was played on 14 October 1951 at Nowlan Park in Kilkenny, between Kilkenny and London, in what was their first meeting in a final in five years. Kilkenny won the match by 3-09 to 3-05 to claim their third championship title overall and a first title since 1946.

== Results ==
=== All-Ireland Junior Hurling Championship ===
==== All-Ireland semi-finals ====
26 August 1951 Semi-final	Galway	5-08 - 2-03	Antrim	Balliansloe Sportsfield

26 August 1951 Semi-final	Kilkenny	3-04 - 2-05	Tipperary	Pirc Daibhín

==== All-Ireland home final ====
11 September 1951 Home final	Kilkenny	4-09 - 4-03	Galway	MacDonagh Park

==== All-Ireland final ====
14 October 1951 Final	Kilkenny	3-09 - 3-05	London	Nowlan Park
