= 1944 Kilkenny Senior Hurling Championship =

Annual hurling competition season

- Champions: Éire Óg (2nd title); Jim Langton (captain)
- Runners-up: Carrickshock; Bob Aylward (captain)

The 1944 Kilkenny Senior Hurling Championship was the 50th staging of the Kilkenny Senior Hurling Championship since its establishment by the Kilkenny County Board in 1887.

Carrickshock were the defending champions.

The final was played on 8 October 1944 at Nowlan Park in Kilkenny, between Éire Óg and Carrickshock, in what was their fourth meeting in the final in seven years. Éire Óg won the match by 7–09 to 4–04 to claim their second championship title overall and a first title in five years.

== Results ==
=== Semi-finals ===
30 July 1944 Semi-final	Éire Óg	5-06 - 5-06	St Brendan's	Thomastown Grounds

30 July 1944 Semi-final	Carrickshock	2-09 - 3-05	Tullaroan	Thomastown Grounds

10 September 1944 Semi-final	Éire Óg	4-08 - 3-06	St Brendan's	Nowlan Park

=== Final ===
8 October 1944 Final	Éire Óg	7-09 - 4-04	Carrickshock	Nowlan Park, Kilkenny
