= Paddy Johnston =

Kilkenny hurler

Personal information
- Native name: Pádraig Mac Seáin (Irish)
- Born: 1933 Kilkenny, Ireland
- Died: 28 September 2001 (aged 68) Kilkenny, Ireland
- Occupation: Clerical officer

Sport
- Sport: Hurling
- Position: Midfield
Clubs
- Years: Club
- St John's; Éire Óg
Inter-county*
Years	County	Apps (scores)
1951–1953	Kilkenny	2 (1–3)
Inter-county titles
- Leinster titles: 0
- All-Irelands: 0
- NHL: 0
- *Inter County team apps and scores correct as of 19:50, 13 September 2014.

Paddy Johnston (1933 – 28 September 2001) was an Irish hurler who played as a midfielder at senior level for the Kilkenny county team.

Born in Kilkenny, Johnston first played competitive hurling during his schooling at Kilkenny CBS. He arrived on the inter-county scene at the age of sixteen when he first linked up with the Kilkenny minor team before later joining the junior side. He joined the senior panel during the 1951 championship. Johnston went on to play a brief role for Kilkenny and won one Leinster medal as a non-playing substitute.

At club level Johnston enjoyed a lengthy career with Éire Óg after beginning his career with St John's.

Throughout his career Johnston made just two championship appearance for Kilkenny. His retirement came following the conclusion of the 1953 championship.

In retirement from playing, Johnston became involved in team management, coaching and refereeing. He mentored a host of local clubs before guiding Clara to championship success. Johnston also served as a referee at club and inter-county levels. Johnston refereed the 1976 All-Ireland Senior Hurling Final between Cork and Wexford.

== Honours ==
Kilkenny

- Leinster Senior Hurling Championship (1): 1953 (sub)
- All-Ireland Junior Hurling Championship (1): 1951
- Leinster Junior Hurling Championship (1): 1951
- All-Ireland Minor Hurling Championship (1): 1950
- Leinster Minor Hurling Championship (1): 1950

Achievements
Preceded by Seán O'Connor (Limerick)	All-Ireland SHC Final referee 1976	Succeeded by Seán O'Grady (Limerick)
