= 1911 Kilkenny Senior Hurling Championship =

Annual hurling competition season

- Champions: Tullaroan (11th title); Sim Walton (captain)
- Runners-up: Mooncoin; Dick Walsh (captain)

The 1911 Kilkenny Senior Hurling Championship was the 23rd staging of the Kilkenny Senior Hurling Championship since its establishment by the Kilkenny County Board.

On 25 August 1912, Tullaroan won the championship after a 4–03 to 2–05 defeat of Mooncoin in the final. This was their 11th championship title overall and their second title in succession.

== Results ==
=== Final ===
25 August 1912 Final	Tullaroan	4-03 - 2-05	Mooncoin	St. James' Park
