= 1915 Kilkenny Senior Hurling Championship =

Annual hurling competition season

- Champions: Tullaroan (12th title); Sim Walton (captain)
- Runners-up: Dicksboro; Jim Dermody (captain)

The 1915 Kilkenny Senior Hurling Championship was the 26th staging of the Kilkenny Senior Hurling Championship since its establishment by the Kilkenny County Board.

On 28 February 1916, Tullaroan won the championship after a 7–02 to 2–02 defeat of Dicksboro in the final. This was their 12th championship title overall and their first in four championship seasons.

== Results ==
=== Final ===
| 28 February 1916 Final | Tullaroan | 7-02 - 2-02 | Dicksboro | St. James's Park |
