= Pat Hayden =

Irish hurler

Pat "Diamond" Hayden
Personal information
- Native name: Pádraig Ó hEideáin (Irish)
- Nickname: The Diamond
- Born: 26 March 1916 Gowran, County Kilkenny, Ireland
- Died: 16 January 1979 (aged 62) Callan, County Kilkenny, Ireland
- Occupation: Lorry driver
- Height: 5 ft 9 in (175 cm)

Sport
- Sport: Hurling
- Position: Full-back
Clubs
- Years: Club
- Castle Rovers; Éire Óg
Club titles
- Kilkenny titles: 1
Inter-county
- Years: County
- 1945-1955: Kilkenny
Inter-county titles
- Leinster titles: 3
- All-Irelands: 1
- NHL: 0

Pat "Diamond" Hayden (26 March 1916 – 16 January 1979) was an Irish hurler who played as a full-back for the Kilkenny senior team.

Born in Gowran, County Kilkenny, Hayden first played competitive hurling whilst at national school. He arrived on the inter-county scene at the age of twenty-nine when he first linked up with the Kilkenny senior team. He made his debut in the 1945 Four Counties League, while also playing for the county junior team. Hayden went on to play a key part for Kilkenny for over a decade, and won one All-Ireland medal and three Leinster medals.

As a member of the Leinster inter-provincial team at various times throughout his career, Hayden won one Railway Cup medal in 1954. At club level he won one championship medal with Éire Óg, after beginning his career with Castle Rovers.
