= Niall Rowe =

Irish hurler

Personal information
- Native name: Niall Ó Rua (Irish)
- Born: 26 August 2003 (age 23) Kilkenny, Ireland
- Occupation: Student

Sport
- Sport: Hurling
- Position: Left corner-back
Club
- Years: Club
- Dicksboro
Club titles
- Kilkenny titles: 0
Inter-county*
Years	County	Apps (scores)
2023-	Kilkenny	0 (0-00)
Inter-county titles
- Leinster titles: 0
- All-Irelands: 1
- NHL: 0
- All Stars: 4
- *Inter County team apps and scores correct as of 21:45, 6 February 2022.

Niall Rowe (born 26 August 2003) is an Irish hurler. At club level he plays with Dicksboro and at inter-county level with the Kilkenny senior hurling team.

== Career ==
Rowe first played hurling at juvenile and underage levels with the Dicksboro club, while also playing as a schoolboy with CBS Kilkenny. He won consecutive Kilkenny MHC titles with Dicksboro in 2019 and as team captain in 2020.

Rowe first appeared on the inter-county scene as a member of the Kilkenny minor hurling team that lost the 2020 All-Ireland minor final to Galway. He subsequently progressed to the under-20 team and was at right corner-back when Kilkenny beat Limerick in the 2022 All-Ireland under-20 final.

Rowe first played for the senior team during the 2023 Walsh Cup.

== Honours ==
Kilkenny

- All-Ireland Under-20 Hurling Championship: 2022
- Leinster Under-20 Hurling Championship: 2022
- Leinster Minor Hurling Championship: 2020
