= 1947 Kilkenny Senior Hurling Championship =

Annual hurling competition season

- Dates: 11 May – 24 August 1947
- Teams: 13
- Champions: Éire Óg (4th title)
- Runners-up: Tullaroan

Tournament statistics
- Matches played: 13
- Goals scored: 89 (6.85 per match)
- Points scored: 180 (13.85 per match)

The 1947 Kilkenny Senior Hurling Championship was the 53rd staging of the Kilkenny Senior Hurling Championship since its establishment by the Kilkenny County Board in 1887. The championship ran from 11 May to 24 August 1947.

Thomastown were the defending champions, however, they were beaten by Éire Óg in the semi-finals.

The final was played on 24 August 1947 at Nowlan Park in Kilkenny, between Éire Óg and Tullaroan, in what was their first ever meeting in the final. Éire Óg won the match by 3–10 to 0–13 to claim their fourth championship title overall and a first title in two years.

== Team changes ==
=== To Championship ===
Promoted from the Kilkenny Junior Hurling Championship

- Graigue

== Results ==
=== First round ===
11 May 1947 First round	Thomastown	5-09 - 0-02	Callan FCA	Grennan Sportsfield

18 May 1947 First round	Tullaroan	6-09 - 1-02	Castlecomer FCA	Freshford Grounds

18 May 1947 First round	Carrickshock	6-03 - 3-06	Dicksboro	John Locke Park

18 May 1947 First round	Éire Óg	9-10 - 3-05	Southern Junior Selection	Grennan Sportsfield

18 May 1947 First round	Graigue	3-09 - 4-05	Northern Junior Selection	Nowlan Park

1 June 1947 First round	Mooncoin	4-10 - 3-05	James Stephens	Waterford Gaelic Field

- St Brendan's received a bye in this round.

=== Second round ===
15 June 1947 Second round	St Brendan's	1-01 - 5-08	Tullaroan	Nowlan Park

15 June 1947 Second round	Carrickshock	2-11 - 4-05	Éire Óg	Grennan Sportsfield

15 June 1947 Second round	Thomastown	7-07 - 2-04	Mooncoin	Waterford Gaelic Field

3 August 1947 Second round replay	Carrickshock	2-07 - 5-06	Éire Óg	Grennan Sportsfield

- Graigue received a bye in this round.

=== Semi-finals ===
17 August 1949 Semi-final	Éire Óg	6-08 - 1-06	Thomastown	Nowlan Park

17 August 1949 Semi-final	Tullaroan	2-12 - 2-07	Graigue	Nowlan Park

=== Final ===
24 August 1947 Final	Éire Óg	3-10 - 0-13	Tullaroan	Nowlan Park
