= 1889 Kilkenny Senior Hurling Championship =

Annual hurling competition season

- Teams: 12
- Champions: Tullaroan (2nd title); James Grace (captain)
- Runners-up: Graine; William Talbot (captain)

The 1889 Kilkenny Senior Hurling Championship was the third staging of the Kilkenny Senior Hurling Championship since its establishment by the Kilkenny County Board. The draw for the opening round fixtures took place on 8 March 1889.

Tullaroan won the championship after a 0–01 to 0–00 defeat of Graine in the final.
