= 1945 Kilkenny Senior Hurling Championship =

Annual hurling competition season

- Champions: Éire Óg (3rd title); Peter Blanchfield (captain)
- Runners-up: Carrickshock; Bob Aylward (captain)

The 1945 Kilkenny Senior Hurling Championship was the 51st staging of the Kilkenny Senior Hurling Championship since its establishment by the Kilkenny County Board in 1887.

Éire Óg were the defending champions.

The final, a replay, was played on 21 October 1945 at Nowlan Park in Kilkenny, between Éire Óg and Carrickshock, in what was their fifth meeting in the final in eight years. Éire Óg won the match by 4–08 to 1–07 to claim their third championship title overall and a second consecutive title.

== Results ==
=== Semi-finals ===
| 12 August 1945 Semi-final | Éire Óg | 4-06 - 2-08 | Northern Junior Selection | Nowlan Park |

| 19 August 1945 Semi-final | Carrickshock | 3-06 - 2-04 | Dicksboro | Thomastown Grounds |

=== Final ===
| 16 September 1945 Final | Éire Óg | 2-07 - 1-10 | Carrickshock | Nowlan Park |

=== Final replay ===
| 21 October 1945 Final replay | Éire Óg | 4-08 - 1-07 | Carrickshock | Nowlan Park |
