= 2004 Kilkenny Intermediate Hurling Championship =

- Teams: 12
- Champions: Carrickshock (1st title); Jamie Power (captain)
- Runners-up: Mooncoin

The 2004 Kilkenny Intermediate Hurling Championship was the 40th staging of the Kilkenny Intermediate Hurling Championship since its establishment by the Kilkenny County Board in 1929.

The final was played on 24 October 2004 at Nowlan Park in Kilkenny, between Carrickshock and Mooncoin, in what was their first ever meeting in the final. Carrickshock won the match by 0–14 to 1–10 to claim their first ever championship title.

== Results ==
=== Final ===
24 October 2004 Final	Carrickshock	0-14 - 1-10	Mooncoin	Nowlan Park
	R Power 0-7, M Rice 0-3, S Power 0-2, J Moran 0-1, J Power 0-1.		D Mackey 0-5, P Ryan 1-0, T O'Hanlon 0-2, R Wall 0-2, B Quinn 0-1.
