= Liam Reidy (hurler) =

Irish hurler (1924–2007)

Personal information
- Native name: Liam Ó Riada (Irish)
- Born: 1924 Kilmacow, County Kilkenny, Ireland
- Died: 15 February 2007 (aged 83) Kilkenny, Ireland
- Height: 5 ft 4 in (163 cm)

Sport
- Sport: Hurling
- Position: Forward
Club
- Years: Club
- Éire Óg
Inter-county
- Years: County
- 1945-1950: Kilkenny
Inter-county titles
- Leinster titles: 3
- All-Irelands: 1
- NHL: 0

Liam Reidy (1924 – 15 February 2007) was an Irish sportsperson who played hurling at his local club Éire Óg and was also a member of the Kilkenny senior inter-county team from the 1940s until the 1950s.

== Biography ==
Liam Reidy was born in Kilmacow, County Kilkenny in 1924. He was educated at the local national school and later attended the famed St. Kieran's College in Kilkenny, a virtual nursery for young hurling talent. Here Reidy began his hurling career in earnest and collected a Leinster junior colleges' championship medal with St Kieran's.

Following his education Reidy was the founder of the highly successful Reidy Insurance Business on Parliament Street in Kilkenny.

== Playing career ==
=== Club ===
Reidy played his club hurling with his local Éire Óg club and enjoyed much success. The 1940s saw Éire Óg enjoy some great victories, with Reidy winning three county championship titles in four years.

=== Inter-county ===
Reidy first came to prominence on the inter-county scene as a member of the Kilkenny minor hurling team in the early 1940s. He won a Leinster title in this grade in 1942 following a 3–10 to 0–4 defeat of Dublin, however, the subsequent All-Ireland series of games were later suspended.

In 1945 Reidy was a key member of the Kilkenny senior team. That year he won his first Leinster winners' medal, however, he didn't line out in the subsequent All-Ireland final. Tipperary provided the opposition on that occasion. Almost 70,000 people packed into Croke Park to witness a classic encounter, with 5,000 more fans being locked out of the stadium. Tipp took the lead at half-time, however, Kilkenny fought back with three second-half goals. In spite of this Tipp held on to win the game by 5–6 to 3–6.

Reidy missed Kilkenny's Leinster final triumph in 1946, however, he was back on the team for the All-Ireland final with Cork. The game itself pitted Cork against old rivals Kilkenny for the first time since 1939. Two quick goals just before half-time put Cork in the driving seat. Five more goals followed in the second period as Cork were the 7–5 to 3–8 winners.

Reidy won a second Leinster title following a defeat of Dublin in 1947. The All-Ireland final was a repeat of the previous year as Cork and Kilkenny did battle again. In what has been described by many as the greatest hurling decider of all-time Mossy O'Riordan and Joe Kelly scored two goals that almost won the game for Cork. Kilkenny, however, fought back with Terry Leahy and Jim Langton leading the charge and eventually won the game by 'the usual point' on a score line of 0–14 to 2–7. It was Reidy's first, and only, All-Ireland winners' medal.

1950 saw Reidy win a third Leinster title. He later lined out in another All-Ireland final, however, on this occasion Tipperary won the game by a single point. Following this defeat Reidy's involvement at inter-county level ended.

=== Provincial ===
Reidy also lined out with Leinster in the inter-provincial hurling competition, however, due to Munster's domination he never won a Railway Cup medal.

== Retirement ==
On taking up golf in 1951 Reidy quickly proved his skill at the game by getting his handicap down to four within a few years and by winning the club match-play championship twice in those years. He represented the club on two Barton Cup winning sides, in 1953 and 1966, and in between also played on the Provincial Towns Cup winning team in 1955. Perhaps his greatest triumph came in 1957 when he won the Waterford Glass Trophy (Scratch Cup) from an elite field.

Reidy served as honorary secretary of Kilkenny Golf Club for a number of years, became captain of the club in 1970 and was honoured with the club presidency in the years 1985–86. He became the first Kilkenny member elected to the Leinster branch of the Golfing Union of Ireland (GUI) and was treasurer of the branch for some years before being elected chairman in 1987.

This led to his selection as president of the GUI in 1992, a position which he filled with style and distinction. During that year Reidy presided over the third successive win for the Irish team in the Home International Championship.
