= 1939 Kilkenny Senior Hurling Championship =

Annual hurling competition season

- Champions: Éire Óg (1st title); T. Delaney (captain)
- Runners-up: Carrickshock; B. Aylward (captain)

The 1939 Kilkenny Senior Hurling Championship was the 45th staging of the Kilkenny Senior Hurling Championship since its establishment by the Kilkenny County Board in 1887.

Carrickshock were the defending champions.

The final was played on 15 October 1939 at Nowlan Park in Kilkenny, between Éire Óg and Carrickshock, in what was their second consecutive meeting in the final. Éire Óg won the match by 3–07 to 3–05 to claim their first ever championship title.

== Results ==
=== Semi-finals ===
13 August 1939 Semi-final	Éire Óg	5-14 - 2-01	Dicksboro	Nowlan Park

13 August 1939 Semi-final	Carrickshock	3-09 - 1-07	Ballyline	Nowlan Park

=== Final ===
15 October 1939 Final	Éire Óg	3-07 - 3-05	Carrickshock	Nowlan Park
