= Tommy Leahy (Kilkenny hurler) =

Irish hurler

Personal information
- Native name: Tomás Ó Laocha (Irish)
- Born: 22 January 1907 Urlingford, County Kilkenny, Ireland
- Died: 29 December 1978 (aged 71) London, England

Sport
- Sport: Hurling
- Position: Centre-forward
Club
- Years: Club
- Emeralds
Club titles
- Kilkenny titles: 0
Inter-county
- Years: County
- 1932-1937: Kilkenny
Inter-county titles
- Leinster titles: 5
- All-Irelands: 3
- NHL: 1

Thomas Leahy (22 January 1907 – 29 December 1978) was an Irish hurler who played as a centre-forward for the Kilkenny senior team from 1932 until 1937.

Leahy made his first appearance for the team during the 1932 championship and became a regular player over the next decade. During that time he won three All-Ireland winner's medal, five Leinster winner's medals and a National Hurling League winners' medal.

At club level Leahy enjoyed a lengthy career with the Emeralds club, however, he failed to win a county club championship winners' medal.

Leahy's brother, Terry, was also an All-Ireland medal-winner with Kilkenny. His brother-in-law, John Joe Cassidy won All-Ireland medals with the Cavan senior football team.
