= Joe Millea =

Kilkenny hurler (1941–2020)

Personal information
- Native name: Seosamh Ó Maolaoidh (Irish)
- Born: 21 October 1941 Kilmanagh, County Kilkenny, Ireland
- Died: 30 January 2020 (aged 78) Dublin, Ireland
- Height: 5 ft 10 in (178 cm)

Sport
- Sport: Hurling
- Position: Full-forward
Clubs
- Years: Club
- Graigue; Graigue–Ballycallan
Club titles
- Kilkenny titles: 0
Inter-county
Years	County	Apps (scores)
1969–1970	Kilkenny	5 (1–04)
Inter-county titles
- Leinster titles: 1
- All-Irelands: 1
- NHL: 0
- All Stars: 0

Joseph Millea (21 October 1941 – 30 January 2020) was an Irish hurler. At club level he played with Graigue, Graigue-Ballycallan and also lined out at inter-county level with the Kilkenny senior hurling team.

== Career ==
Millea first played hurling and Gaelic football at club level with Graigue. He was part of the Graigue team that won junior divisional football honours in 1960, before ending the year with a Kilkenny JFC medal after a defeat of St Nicholas's in the final. A decade later Millea, by now playing with the Graigue-Ballycallan amalgamation, added a North Kilkenny JHC medal to his collection.

Millea joined the Kilkenny senior hurling team in advance of the 1969 season and quickly won a Leinster SHC medal. He later scored a goal in Kilkenny's defeat of Cork in the 1969 All-Ireland final. Millea lined out in a second Leinster final without success in 1970. He was called up to the Leinster inter-provincial team in 1971 and won a Railway Cup medal that year after a defeat of Munster in the final.

In retirement from playing, Millea became involved in the coaching and administrative affairs of the Graigue-Ballycallan club.

== Personal life and death ==
Millea built a successful business in land reclamation over several years. His daughters, Sinéad and Tracy, played camogie with Kilkenny and were All-Ireland SCC winners.

Millea died at St. James's Hospital, Dublin on 30 January 2020, at the age of 78.

== Honours ==
Graigue

- Kilkenny Junior Football Championship: 1960
- Northern Kilkenny Junior Football Championship: 1960

Graigue-Ballycallan

- Northern Kilkenny Junior Hurling Championship: 1970

Kilkenny

- All-Ireland Senior Hurling Championship: 1969
- Leinster Senior Hurling Championship: 1969
- Oireachtas Tournament: 1969

Leinster

- Railway Cup: 1971
