= 1931 Kilkenny Senior Hurling Championship =

Annual hurling competition season

- Champions: Carrickshock (1st title); Willie Kelly (captain)
- Runners-up: Urlingford; Tommy Leahy (captain)

The 1931 Kilkenny Senior Hurling Championship was the 37th staging of the Kilkenny Senior Hurling Championship since its establishment by the Kilkenny County Board.

On 13 December 1931, Carrickshock won the championship after a 5–08 to 3–08 defeat of Urlingford in the final. It was their first ever championship title.

== Results ==
=== Semi-finals ===
12 July 1931 Semi-final	Urlingford	2-04 - 0-01	James Stephens	John Locke Park

29 November 1931 Semi-final	Carrickshock	3-06 - 2-01	Mooncoin	Nowlan Park

=== Final ===
13 December 1931 Final	Carrickshock	5-08 - 3-08	Urlingford	Nowlan Park
