= 2017 Kilkenny Senior Hurling Championship =

Annual hurling competition season

- Dates: 16 September 2017 – 29 October 2017
- Teams: 12
- Sponsor: St. Canice's Credit Union
- Champions: Dicksboro (5th title); Ollie Walsh (captain); Mark Dowling (manager)
- Runners-up: James Stephens; Niall Tyrrell (manager)
- Relegated: St. Martin's

Tournament statistics
- Matches played: 15
- Goals scored: 49 (3.27 per match)
- Points scored: 464 (30.93 per match)
- Top scorer(s): David Walton (1-51)

The 2017 Kilkenny Senior Hurling Championship was the 123rd staging of the Kilkenny Senior Hurling Championship since its establishment by the Kilkenny County Board in 1887. The championship began on 16 September 2017 and ended 29 October 2017.

O'Loughlin Gaels were the defending champions, however, they were defeated by Dicksboro in the semi-final.

On 29 October 2017, Dicksboro won the championship following a 4–15 to 4–10 defeat of James Stephens in the final. This was their fifth championship title overall and their first since 1993.

David Walton of the James Stephens club was the championship's top scorer with 1-51.

== Team changes ==
=== To Championship ===
Promoted from the Kilkenny Intermediate Hurling Championship

- Carrickshock

=== From Championship ===
Relegated to the Kilkenny Intermediate Hurling Championship

- Fenians

== Results ==
=== First round ===
Four of the twelve teams received byes into the quarter-finals. The remaining eight teams played in four matches with the winners progressing to the quarter-finals.

16 September 2017 First round	Erin's Own	1-15 - 0-10	Danesfort	Pairc Sheamuis Stiopháin, Kilkenny
2:00pm	S Buggy 1-8, C Fogarty 0-3, M Murphy 0-2, M Boran 0-1, A Moran 0-1.		G Tynan 0-2, P Hickey 0-2, R Hogan 0-2, R Walsh 0-2, P Walsh 0-1, J Mullally 0-1.	Referee: G Quilty (Slieverue)

16 September 2017 First round	Mullinavat	2-14 - 0-10	Bennettsbridge	Páirc Na Seamróg, Ballyhale
4:30pm	M Malone 1-2, J Walsh 0-5, J Gahan 1-0, I Duggan 0-2, W O'Dwyer 0-2, S Aylward 0-1, M Mansfield 0-1, L Fennelly 0-1.		N Cleere 0-5, B Lannon 0-2, L Blanchfield 0-1, S Morrissey 0-1, W Murphy 0-1.	Referee: P Burke (Emeralds)

17 September 2017 First round	Ballyhale Shamrocks	2-16 - 0-12	Rower-Inistioge	Grennan Park, Thomastown
12:00pm	TJ Reid 0-11, C Fennelly 1-1, R Corcoran 1-0, E Reid 0-1, M Aylward 0-1, J Cuddigy 0-1, A Mullen 0-1.		R Galavan 0-6, C Ryan 0-1, K Murphy 0-1, P Lyng 0-1, T Murphy 0-1, C Bolger 0-1, C Joyce 0-1.	Referee: S Cleere (O'Loughlin Gaels)

17 September 2017 First round	James Stephens	2-22 - 2-10	St. Martin's	Canon Kearns Park, Castlecomer
12:00pm	E Larkin 2-0, D Walton 0-13, M Drennan 0-4, T Dwyer 0-3, L Scanlon 0-1, M Ruth 0-1.		O Walsh 2-0, J Shore 0-4, J Mulhall 0-2, J Maher 0-1, T Breen 0-1, C McGrath 0-1, J Dowling 0-1.	Referee: C Everard (Graigue-Ballycallan)

=== Relegation play-off ===
1 October 2017 First round	Bennettsbridge	1-20 - 0-15	St. Martin's	Canon Kearns Park, Castlecomer
2:00pm	Nicky Cleere (1-11, frees); D Wafer, K Blanchfield, B Lannon (0-2 each); A Cleere, L Blanchfield, S Morrissey (0-1 each).		J Shore (0-6, 0-4 frees, one 65); J Mulhall, J Maher (0-2 each); C McGrath, T Breen, R Reid, S Kinsella, D Walsh (0-1 each).	Referee: S Cleere (O'Loughlin Gaels)

=== Quarter-finals ===
30 September 2017 Quarter-final	O'Loughlin Gaels	1-19 - 0-13	Erin's Own	Nowlan Park, Kilkenny
2:00pm	M Bergin 0-11, M Kelly 1-1, S Bolger 0-2, M Comerford 0-2, P Deegan 0-1, S Johnston 0-1, J Nolan 0-1.		M Murphy 0-4, M Boran 0-3, C Fogarty 0-2, N McMahon 0-1, A Moran 0-1, A Owens 0-1, S Buggy 0-1.	Referee: P Cahill (Dunnamaggin); Man of the Match: M Murphy

30 September 2017 Quarter-final	Ballyhale Shamrocks	2-14 - 2-14	Clara	Nowlan Park, Kilkenny
3:45pm	TJ Reid 0-10 (0-8f, 2 '65), R Corcoran and M Fennelly 1-0, J Cuddihy 0-2, R Reid and C Fennelly 0-1 each		J Murphy 2-0, D Langton (0-4f) and L Ryan 0-4 each, C O'Shea 0-2, T Ryan, L Ryan, J Langton, C Bolger (0-1f) 0-1 each.	Man of the Match: C O'Shea

1 October 2017 Quarter-final	Dicksboro	2-14 - 1-17	Mullinavat	Páirc Na Seamróg, Ballyhale
12:30pm	M Gaffney 1-2, S Stapleton 0-4, C Buckley 1-0, A Gaffney 0-3, O Walsh 0-2, C Doheny 0-1, K Kenny 0-1, O Gough 0-1.		I Duggan 0-7, J Fennelly 1-0, W O'Dwyer 0-3, T Aylward 0-2, M Malone 0-2, M Mansfield 0-1, J Walsh 0-1, J Gahan 0-1.	Referee: P Burke (Emeralds)

1 October 2017 Quarter-final	Carrickshock	2-19 - 2-19	James Stephens	Grennan Park, Thomastown
12:30pm	K Farrell 0-7, J Power 0-5, M O'Dwyer 1-1, J Power 1-0, B Donovan 0-3, R Power 0-1, D Walsh 0-1, M Rice 0-1.		D Walton 0-10, L Scanlon 1-3, M Drennan 1-0, E Larkin 0-2, J McGrath 0-1, D Hennessy 0-1, N Mullins 0-1, N Brassil 0-1.	Referee: G Quilty (Slieverue)

7 October 2017 Quarter-final replay	Ballyhale Shamrocks	2-22 - 4-14 (aet)	Clara	Grennan Park, Thomastown
12:30pm	TJ Reid 1-10, A Mullen 1-3, D Mullen 0-2, J Cuddihy 0-2, R Corcoran 0-2, C Fennelly 0-2, M Fennelly 0-1.		C Bolger 1-6, L Ryan 1-2, J Langton 1-0, J Murphy 1-0, D Langton 0-3, J Nolan 0-2, L Ryan 0-1.	Referee: R Dowling (Kilmacow)

7 October 2017 Quarter-final replay	Dicksboro	2-18 - 2-16	Mullinavat	John Locke Park, Callan
2:30pm	S Stapleton 0-7, O Gough 1-1, O Walsh 0-4, B Sheehan 0-4, R Fitzpatrick 1-0, A Gaffney 0-1, R Murphy 0-1.		I Duggan 0-8, J Walsh 1-3, L Fennelly 1-0, T Aylward 0-2, G Malone 0-2, M Mansfield 0-1.	Referee: C Everard (Graigue-Ballycallan)

7 October 2017 Quarter-final replay	James Stephens	2-23 - 3-17	Carrickshock	John Locke Park, Callan
4:15pm	D Walton 0-15, M Ruth 1-1, T Dwyer 1-0, N Brassil 0-2, E Larkin 0-1, L Scanlon 0-1, N Mullins 0-1, S Donoghue 0-1, D Hennessy 0-1.		K Farrell 0-8, B O'Donovan 1-2, J Cahill 1-1, M O'Dwyer 1-0, R Power 0-2, J Power 0-2, D Brennan 0-1, D Walsh 0-1.	Referee: O Kenny (Tullogher-Rosbercon)

=== Semi-finals ===
15 October 2017 Semi-final	James Stephens	3-16 - 1-12	Ballyhale Shamrocks	Nowlan Park, Kilkenny
2:00 pm	D Walton (0-8, 0-6 frees, 0-1 '65); T Dwyer (2-1); E Larkin (1-0); L Scanlon (0-3); N Mullins, C Browne, M Drennan, S Donoghue (0-1 each).		TJ Reid (0-7, 0-4 frees); C Fennelly (1-2); R Reid, R Corcoran, E Reid (0-1 each).

15 October 2017 Semi-final	Dicksboro	1-14 - 0-14	O'Loughlin Gaels	Nowlan Park, Kilkenny
3:45 pm	A Gaffney (0-4); M Gaffney (1-1); S Stapleton (0-3); O Gough, B Sheehan (0-2 each); O Walsh, R Fitzpatrick (0-1 each).		M Bergin (0-8); J Nolan (0-2); P Deegan, S Bolger, M Comerford, J Molloy (0-1 each).

=== Final ===
29 October 2017 Final	Dicksboro	4-15 - 4-10	James Stephens	Nowlan Park, Kilkenny
3:15pm	O Gough 2-0, B Sheehan 1-3, S Stapleton 0-5 (0-4f, 1 '65), M Gaffney 1-1, O Walsh 0-2, T Kenny, A Nolan, R Fitzpatrick, P O'Flynn 0-1 each.	Report	D Walton 1-5 (0-5f), L Scanlon, M Ruth, T Dwyer 1-1 each, M Drennan 0-2.	Attendance: 7,453; Referee: M O'Sullivan (Ballyhale Shamrocks); Man of the Match: Robbie Fitzpatrick

== Championship statistics ==
=== Top scorers ===
Top scorers overall

Rank	Player	Club	Tally	Total	Matches	Average
1	David Walton	James Stephens	1-51	54	5	10.80
2	T. J. Reid	Ballyhale Shamrocks	1-38	41	4	10.25
3	Nicky Cleere	Bennettsbridge	1-16	19	2	9.50
3	Mark Bergin	O'Loughlin Gaels	0-19	19	2	9.50
3	Shane Stapleton	Dicksboro	0-19	19	4	4.75
4	Tadhg Dwyer	James Stephens	4-05	17	5	3.40
4	Ian Duggan	Mullinavat	0-17	17	3	5.66
5	Luke Scanlon	James Stephens	2-09	15	5	3.00
5	Kevin Farrell	Carrickshock	0-15	15	2	7.50
6	Oisín Gough	Dicksboro	3-04	13	4	3.25
6	Martin Gaffney	Dicksboro	3-04	13	4	3.25

Top scorers in a single game

Rank	Player	Club	Tally	Total	Opposition
1	David Walton	James Stephens	0-15	15	Carrickshock
2	Nicky Cleere	Bennettsbridge	1-11	14	St. Martin's
3	T. J. Reid	Ballyhale Shamrocks	1-10	13	Clara
3	David Walton	James Stephens	0-13	13	St. Martin's
4	Seán Buggy	Erin's Own	1-08	11	Danesfort
4	T. J. Reid	Ballyhale Shamrocks	0-11	11	Rower-Inistioge
4	Mark Bergin	O'Loughlin Gaels	0-11	11	Erin's Own
5	T. J. Reid	Ballyhale Shamrocks	0-10	10	Clara
5	David Walton	James Stephens	0-10	10	Carrickshock
6	Chris Bolger	Clara	1-06	9	Ballyhale Shamrocks
