= Ramie Dowling =

Irish hurler

Personal information
- Native name: Réamann Ó Dúllaing (Irish)
- Born: Kilmacow, County Kilkenny

Sport
- Sport: Hurling
- Position: Goalkeeper
Club
- Years: Club
- Éire Óg
Inter-county
- Years: County
- 1940s-1950s: Kilkenny
Inter-county titles
- Leinster titles: 2
- All-Irelands: 0

Ramie Dowling (1921–2004) was an Irish sportsperson. He played hurling at various times with his local clubs Éire Óg, Mullinavat, Mount Sion and Mooncoin and was a member of the Kilkenny senior inter-county team in the 1940s and the 1950s.

Dowling played at midfield on the Kilkenny minor team of 1939 when beaten in the All-Ireland final by Cork, and later he played as a half-forward with the county junior side. His lone major success at senior level was the Oireachtas win of 1947. Dowling also figured on the Leinster championship winning sides of 1950 and 1953. In the former year Kilkenny won through to the All-Ireland final. This was Dowling's lone appearance in Croke Park as a player on All-Ireland day, but despite a full blooded performances 'the Cats' had to give best to old rivals, Tipperary. At club level he won four senior championships with Éire Óg, who were a huge force at the time. These successes came in 1939, 1944, 1945 and 1947. Dowling also had a keen eye for greyhounds. He bred the Irish Derby winner of 1988, Make History, that also won the Puppy Derby.
