= 1946 All-Ireland Junior Hurling Championship =

All Ireland Champions
- Winners: Kilkenny (2nd win)
- Captain: P. Dack

All Ireland Runners-up
- Runners-up: London
- Captain: M. Wade

Provincial Champions
- Munster: Limerick
- Leinster: Kilkenny
- Ulster: Not Played
- Connacht: Galway

The 1946 All-Ireland Junior Hurling Championship was the 25th staging of the All-Ireland Junior Championship since its establishment by the Gaelic Athletic Association in 1912. It was the first championship to be completed in the aftermath of the Emergency.

Limerick entered the championship as the defending champions.

The All-Ireland final was played on 6 October 1946 at Nowlan Park in Kilkenny, between Kilkenny and London, in what was their first ever meeting in a final. Kilkenny won the match by 5-04 to 2-02 to claim their second championship title overall and a first title since 1928.

== Results ==
=== All-Ireland Junior Hurling Championship ===
==== All-Ireland semi-final ====
25 August 1946 Semi-final	Kilkenny	4-05 - 2-05	Limerick	Waterford Sportsfield

==== All-Ireland home final ====
15 September 1946 Home final	Kilkenny	4-02 - 2-03	Galway	O'Moore Park

==== All-Ireland final ====
6 October 1946 Final	Kilkenny	5-04 - 2-02	London	Nowlan Park
