= Graigue GAA =

Gaelic games club in County Kilkenny, Ireland

Graigue
- Gráig
- Founded: 1943
- County: Kilkenny
- Grounds: Graigue

Senior Club Championships
	All Ireland	Leinster champions	Kilkenny champions
Hurling:	0	0	1

Graigue GAA was a Gaelic Athletic Association club located in Graigue, County Kilkenny, Ireland. The club fielded teams in both Gaelic football and hurling.

== History ==
Located in the Graigue area, on the Kilkenny-Tipperary border, the club had its first success in 1946 when it was awarded the Northern Kilkenny JHC title after an objection was upheld. The Kilkenny JHC was later claimed after a defeat of St Kieran's, Clogga in the final. This win secured senior status for Graigue for the first time. Within three years the club had reached the pinnacle of Kilkenny club hurling when Graigue won the Kilkenny SHC after a defeat of Tullaroan in the final. The club missed out on the Kilkenny SFC title after a defeat by Railyard in 1961. After a period of decline the club amalgamated with nearby Ballycallan in 1969 to form the Graigue-Ballycallan club.

== Honours ==
- Kilkenny Senior Hurling Championship (1): 1949
- Kilkenny Junior Football Championship (1): 1960
- Kilkenny Junior Hurling Championship (1): 1946
- Northern Kilkenny Junior Football Championship (1): 1960
- Northern Kilkenny Junior Hurling Championship (1): 1946

== Notable players ==
- Bill Cahill: All-Ireland SHC-winner (1947)
- Mick Kenny: All-Ireland SHC-winner (1957)
- Joe Millea: All-Ireland SHC-winner (1969)
