= Carrickshock GAA =

Irish Gaelic Athletic Association club

Carrickshock
- Carraig Seac
- Founded: 1928
- County: Kilkenny
- Nickname: Shock
- Colours
- Grounds: Carrickshock GAA Grounds
- Coordinates: 52°27′20.16″N 7°13′27.91″W

Playing kits
Standard colours

Senior Club Championships
	All Ireland	Leinster champions	Kilkenny champions
Hurling:	0	0	7
Camogie:	0	0	1

Carrickshock GAA is a Gaelic Athletic Association club located in Hugginstown, County Kilkenny, Ireland. The club is affiliated to the Kilkenny County Board and fields teams in hurling and camogie.

== History ==
Located in the parish of Aghavillar, covering the Hugginstown, Newmarket and Stoneyford areas, Carrickshock GAA Club was founded in 1928 when the Hugginstown and Knockmoylan teams amalgamated. The new club was named in honour of the Battle of Carrickshock. Success was immediate, with Carrickshock winning the Kilkenny JHC title in their debut year.

After losing the KIlkenny SHC final to Mooncoin in their first year in the senior grade, Carrickshock claimed their first Kilkenny SHC title in 1931, following a 5–08 to 3–08 win over Urlingford. The club lost the next four finals, before defeating Éire Óg to win their second Kilkenny SHC title in 1938. That was the first of nine consecutive final appearances, with Carrickshock winning a then record of four consecutive titles between 1940 and 1943. Carrickshock beat Tullaroan by 5–06 to 4–05 to win their seventh and final Kilkenny SHC title in 1951.

The introduction of the Parish Rule in 1953, a rule which aimed to prevent the rise of dominant super clubs by requiring clubs to reorganise so that no team drew players from more than three parishes, impacted on Carrickshock's success. In spite of this, the club claimed Kilkenny JHC titles in 1954, 1979 and 1999, as well as Kilkenny IHC titles in 2004 and 2016. The latter title was subsequently converted into a Leinster Club IHC title. Carrickshock won the All-Ireland Club IHC title in February 2017, after beating Ahascragh–Fohenagh by 2–15 to 0–06 in the 2017 All-Ireland Club IHC final.

== Honours ==
- Kilkenny Senior Hurling Championship (7): 1931, 1938, 1940, 1941, 1942, 1943, 1951
- Kilkenny Senior Hurling League (1): 2012
- All-Ireland Intermediate Club Hurling Championship (1): 2017
- Leinster Intermediate Club Hurling Championship (2): 2004, 2016
- Kilkenny Intermediate Hurling Championship (2): 2004, 2016
- Kilkenny Junior Hurling Championship (4): 1928, 1954, 1979, 1999
- Kilkenny Minor Hurling Championship (2): 2001, 2002

== Notable hurlers ==
- Paddy Grace: All-Ireland SHC-winner (1939, 1947)
- Richie Power Jnr: All-Ireland SHC-winner (2006, 2007, 2008, 2009, 2011, 2012, 2014, 2015)
- Richie Power Snr: All-Ireland SHC-winner (1982, 1983)
- John Tennyson: All-Ireland SHC-winner (2006, 2007, 2008, 2009, 2011, 2012)
- Jimmy Walsh: All-Ireland SHC-winner (1932, 1933, 1935, 1939)
