= Éire Óg GAA (Kilkenny) =

Gaelic games club in County Kilkenny, Ireland

Éire Óg
- Éire Óg
- Founded: 1931
- County: Kilkenny
- Nickname: The United Nations
- Colours: Green and white
- Grounds: None

Playing kits
Standard colours

Senior Club Championships
	All Ireland	Leinster champions	Kilkenny champions
Hurling:	0	0	4

Éire Óg GAA was a Gaelic Athletic Association club located in Kilkenny, Ireland. The club was almost solely concerned with the game of hurling.

== History ==
The Éire Óg club was founded in Kilkenny CBS in 1931. Initially adopting blue and white colours and called Young Irelands, the club quickly became Éire Óg and changed to green and white. The club first came to hurling prominence by winning five Kilkenny MAHC titles in six seasons between 1932 and 1937. A number of these schoolboy players from this grade went on to form the nucleus of the club's adult team over the following decade. After winning the Kilkenny JHC title in 1936, Éire Óg secured promotion to the top tier of Kilkenny hurling by claiming the Kilkenny IHC title the following year. The club went on to appear in seven county finals between 1938 and 1950, with victories coming on four occasions. Defeat in the 1950 county final replay brought about the break-up of the successful team of the previous decade. New players emerged, however, a ready supply of minor players dried up as city rivals James Stephens and Dicksboro came to prominence. The club's final game took place against Rower-Inistioge in 1968 and the club was later disbanded.

== Honours ==
- Kilkenny Senior Hurling Championship: 1939, 1944, 1945, 1947
- Kilkenny Intermediate Hurling Championship: 1937
- Kilkenny Junior Football Championship: 1937
- Kilkenny Junior Hurling Championship: 1936
- North Kilkenny Junior Football Championship: 1937
- North Kilkenny Junior Hurling Championship: 1936
- Kilkenny Minor A Hurling Championship: 1932, 1934, 1935, 1936, 1937
- North Kilkenny Minor A Hurling Championship: 1932, 1934, 1935, 1936, 1937, 1941

== Notable players ==
- Ramie Dowling
- Jack Egan
- Jack Gargan
- Paddy Grace
- Pat Hayden
- Paddy Johnston
- Jim Langton
- Fan Larkin
- Paddy Larkin
- Pádraig Lennon
- Jack Mulcahy
- Paddy O'Brien
- Seánie O'Brien
- Tommy O'Connell
- Nick O'Donnell
- Jimmy Phelan
- Liam Reidy
