= Tullaroan GAA =

GAA club in Kilkenny, Ireland

Tullaroan
- Tulach Ruáin
- Founded: 1884
- County: Kilkenny
- Nickname: The Sash
- Colours
- Grounds: Tullaroan GAA Grounds
- Coordinates: 52°39′41″N 7°26′37″W

Playing kits
Standard colours

Senior Club Championships
| | All Ireland | Leinster champions | Kilkenny champions |
|---|---|---|---|
| Hurling: | 0 | 0 | 20 |
| Camogie: | 0 | 0 | 2 |

Tullaroan GAA is a Gaelic Athletic Association club located in Tullaroan, County Kilkenny, Ireland. The club is affiliated to the Kilkenny County Board and fields teams in hurling and Gaelic football

== History ==
Located in the village of Tullaroan, on the Kilkenny-Tipperary border, Tullaroan GAA Club was founded in 1884, making it the oldest club in Kilkenny still in existence. Tullaroan won the inaugural Kilkenny SHC title in 1887, after beating Mooncoin by 1–01 to 0–04 (a goal out-valued any number of points) in the final. The rivalry with Mooncoin quickly developed into the foremost rivalry in Kilkenny club hurling, with both clubs sharing 29 championship titles between 1887 and 1948. Tullaroan's 3–16 to 0–01 defeat of Mooncoin in the 1902 final remains the most one-sided final of all time.

Tullaroan dominated hurling in each of the decades up to the 1920s, before winning their 15th Kilkenny SHC title in 1930. The introduction of the Three Parish Rule in 1953, a rule which aimed to prevent the rise of dominant super clubs by requiring clubs to reorganise so that no team drew from more than three parishes, impacted on Tullaroan's success. In spite of this, Tullaroan claimed the 1958 title after beating Bennettsbridge by 1–12 to 3–02 in the final. 36 years elapsed before Tullaroan won their 20th and last Kilkenny SHC title in 1994.

After losing their senior status, Tullaroan won the Kilkenny IHC title in 2019, following a 3–18 to 0–21 defeat of Thomastown. A subsequent win over Seir Kieran secured the Leinster Club IHC title. Tullaroan became All-Ireland Club IHC champions after beating Fr O'Neill's by 3-19 to 5-12 in the 2020 All-Ireland Club IHC final.

== Honours ==
- Kilkenny Senior Hurling Championship (20): 1887, 1889, 1895, 1897, 1899, 1901, 1902, 1904, 1907, 1910, 1911, 1915, 1924, 1925, 1930, 1933, 1934, 1948, 1958, 1994
- All-Ireland Intermediate Club Hurling Championship (1): 2020
- Leinster Intermediate Club Hurling Championship (1): 2019
- Kilkenny Intermediate Hurling Championship (2): 1988, 2019
- Kilkenny Junior Hurling Championships (1): 1983
- Kilkenny Under-21 Hurling Championships (1): 2001
- Kilkenny Minor Hurling Championships (1): 1999

== Notable hurlers ==
- Lory Meagher: All-Ireland SHC-winner (1932, 1933, 1935)
- Paddy Phelan: All-Ireland SHC-winner (1932, 1933, 1935, 1939)
- Tommy Walsh: All-Ireland SHC-winner (2002, 2003, 2006, 2007, 2008, 2009, 2011, 2012, 2014)
- Sim Walton: All-Ireland SHC-winner (1904, 1905, 1907, 1909, 1911, 1912, 1913)
