= Dicksboro GAA =

Gaelic games club in County Kilkenny, Ireland

Dicksboro
- Dicsboro
- Founded: 1909
- County: Kilkenny
- Nickname: The 'Boro
- Colours: Maroon and white
- Grounds: Palmerstown
- Coordinates: 52.656749°N 7.272553°W

Playing kits
Standard colours

Senior Club Championships
	All Ireland	Leinster champions	Kilkenny champions
Football:	-	-	3
Hurling:	-	-	5
Camogie:	1	3	5

Dicksboro is a Gaelic Athletic Association club located in Kilkenny City, Ireland.

== History ==
Dicksboro GAA club was founded in 1909. The club takes its name from Dicksboro townland, located next to Kilkenny Airport. The current ground is Palmerstown, to the west of the city, to which the club moved in June 1990.

Dicksboro entered and won the junior championship of 1910. It entered the senior championship in 1911.

Dicksboro had no team from 1961 to 1969, when the club was reformed.

== Honours ==
=== Hurling ===
- Kilkenny Senior Hurling Championship Winners (5) 1923, 1926, 1950, 1993, 2017 Runners-Up 1915, 1925, 1928, 1937, 1994, 2012, 2020
- Leinster Senior Club Hurling Championship (0) Runners-Up 1993
- Kilkenny Intermediate Hurling Championship Winners (3) 1991, 2005, 2010 Runners-up 1976, 1977, 1981, 2009
- Leinster Intermediate Club Hurling Championship Winners (2) 2005, 2010
- All-Ireland Intermediate Club Hurling Championship Winners (1) 2006 Runners-Up 2011
- Kilkenny Junior Hurling Championship Winners (3) 1910, 1914, 1919
- Kilkenny Special Junior [A] Hurling Championship Winners (1) 1994, 2023
- Kilkenny Under-21 Hurling Championship Winners (9) 1986, 1991, 1992, 2008, 2009, 2014, 2021, 2023, 2024
- Kilkenny Under-21 North Hurling Championship Winners (8) 1986, 1991, 1992, 2005, 2008, 2009, 2014, 2016
- Kilkenny Under-21 Roinn "C" Hurling Championship Winners (1) 2001
- Kilkenny Under-19 Hurling Championship Winners (4) 2019, 2021, 2022, 2023
- Kilkenny Minor Hurling Championship Winners (15) 1951, 1952, 1953, 1969, 1973, 1990, 2006, 2009, 2010, 2015, 2019, 2020, 2021, 2022, 2025
- Kilkenny Minor C Hurling Championship Winners (1) 2007
- All-Ireland Féile na nGael Ronin A (2) 2009, 2017
- Kilkenny Senior Hurling League Winners (5) 1994, 1996, 2017, 2019, 2020
- Kilkenny Intermediate Hurling League Winners (1) 2005
- Aylward Cup Winners (1) 2005
- Kilkenny Minor Hurling League Winners (2) 1983, 2009
- Kilkenny Minor Hurling League Roinn 'C Winners (1) 2007
- Kilkenny Junior Hurling League Winners (1) 2008
- Byrne Cup Winners (4) 1998, 1999, 2000, 2008

=== Camogie ===
- All-Ireland Senior Club Camogie Championship Winners (1) 2023
- Leinster Senior Camogie Championship Winners (3) 2023, 2025, 2026
- Kilkenny Senior Camogie Championship Winners (5) 2019, 2021, 2023, 2025, 2026
- Kilkenny Intermediate [A] Camogie Championship Winners (1) 2011
- Kilkenny Junior [A] Camogie Championship Winners (3) 1991, 2009, 2025
- Kilkenny Under-21 [A] Camogie Championship Winners (1) 2015
- All-Ireland Féile na nGael Ronin "A" Winners (1) 2013
- Feile 'A' Shield Champions Winners (1) 2019
- Kilkenny Junior League Winners (2) 2008, 2009

=== Football ===
- Kilkenny Senior Football Championship Winners (3) 1994, 1997, 2024 (Runners-Up 1995, 2000)
- Kilkenny Intermediate Football Championship Winners (2) 1991, 2016
- Kilkenny Junior Football Championship Winners (1) 1990
- Kilkenny Special Junior Football Championship Winners (2) 1982, 1994
- Kilkenny Under-21 Football Champions Winners (4) 1985, 1989, 1990, 1991, 2016
- Kilkenny Minor Football Championship Winners (6) 1969, 1970, 1971, 1984, 1989, 2003

== Notable hurlers ==
Player	Era	County titles		
Player	Era	All-Ireland	Leinster	County
Matty Power	1920s–1930s	1922, 1927*, 1932, 1933, 1935	1922, 1923, 1925, 1927*, 1928*, 1930*, 1931, 1932, 1933, 1935, 1936, 1937	1925*, 1926*, 1927*, 1928*, 1929*, 1931*
Paddy Grace	1930s–1950s	1939, 1947	1939, 1940, 1945, 1946, 1947	1940*, 1941*, 1942*, 1943*
Dan Kennedy	1930s–1950s	1947	1945, 1946, 1947, 1950	1946, 1950, 1952, 1953, 1955, 1956
Michael Walsh	1980s–1990s	1992, 1993	1991, 1992, 1993	1993
Cillian Buckley	2010s-2020s	2012, 2014, 2015	2014, 2015, 2016	2017
*After moving to Dublin Matty Power played for the Dublin senior hurling team. He won his six county titles while playing with the Garda GAA club in Dublin. *Paddy Grace won four county titles in a row while playing with Carrickshock.

Other players who played Kilkenny at Senior:

- Pádraic Moylan- 2022 All-Ireland Under-20 Hurling winning captain
- Timmy Clifford
- Bill Sheehan
- Evan Cody
- Niall Rowe
- Dan O'Neill

== See also ==
- Kilkenny Senior Hurling Championship
- Kilkenny Senior Football Championship
- Leinster Intermediate Club Hurling Championship
