= Sean (John) O'Farrell =

Irish cricketer, Gaelic player and farmer

Sean (John) O'Farrell (1909–1972) was a cricketer and a well known figure in farming in Ireland, and in Irish Gaelic games. He was born in Kilcurl, County Kilkenny, near the villages of Knocktopher and Ballyhale, and migrated to the UK before returning to Ireland and settling in Wicklow. He was managing director of the National Ploughing Association and National Ploughing Championships (1958-1972), and was active in promoting hurling and campaigning for the abolition of The Ban on GAA players playing non-Gaelic sports.

== Biography ==
Sean was managing director of the National Ploughing Association (NPA) from 1958 to 1972, with a countrywide network of county associations. O'Farrell's greatest sporting achievements were with GAA with his Carrickshock GAA Club and the Kilkenny GAA County hurling team, in 1933. He also played cricket, which was the main sport in Kilkenny in the 19th century with 45 club teams in 1880, and who in a revival after World War 1 lasting from 1924 up until 1931, still had 20 active club teams. He was a brother of Richard (Dick) O'Farrell (1903–79) a well-known Kilkenny farmer who was a member of Ballyhale Creamery Coop that amalgamated with over 30 other Kilkenny Creamery coops in 1966 to collectively form Avonmore Coop food brand that ultimately grew to become the giant global nutrition entity, Glanbia Plc; and who was better known locally as the Carlow Sugar Beet Factory Agent for South Kilkenny until his retirement after 33 years in 1969. He was a brother of the well-known custodian of social memory and of Carrickshock incident cause celebre, Mary Wallace (1901–99). He was also a brother of the Gaelic scholar Fr Pat O'Farrell (1900–56), STL (Licentiate of Sacred Theology, from the University of Fribourg, Switzerland), who was Professor of Moral Theology, Canon Law & Philosophy at St Kieran's College Seminary and also a long-time Gaelic teacher at the Irish College in Ring, Co Waterford. St Kieran's College, which is more nationally known as the home of Kilkenny hurling, was founded in 1782 and was the first Roman Catholic secondary school in Ireland. Sean has one son, Sean (Og) O'Farrell, who ran Lil Doyle's Pub for many years and former President of Arklow Rugby Club.

== Associations ==
In 1958 the National Ploughing Association (NPA) appointed Sean O'Farrell as managing director to harness its already evident future potential, and to lay the foundations for the future. NPA, a member of the World Ploughing Association, runs the National Ploughing Championships, and now claimed by NPA to be the largest Outdoor Show in Europe 2016. He was one of only three MD's in its 84-year history, where he recorded a number of notable achievements. A national bread baking competition was introduced by NPA in co-operation with ESB in 1958 and continues to this day. In 1959 he represented the NPA at the 7th World Ploughing Contest to Armoy, County Antrim, Northern Ireland and the first time held there. He honoured his county by 'bringing home' the NPA Championships on three occasions – to Burnchurch, County Kilkenny, in 1959 and returned to Danesfort, Co Kilkenny in 1964 and again for a third time in 1970. He attended the 8th World Ploughing Contest in Tor Mancina, Roma, Italy 1960 where he proudly presented a distinctive block of his native Kilkenny marble as Ireland's contribution to Rome's 'Cairn of Peace' in 1960. A highlight of his tenure was when representing Ireland at 9th World Ploughing Contest, Grignon, Paris, France in 1961 where, in his role of MD of NPA and representing Ireland, was officially introduced to the President of France, Charles de Gaulle.

John was a big man over 6 ft. but he always proudly displayed that photo on his pub wall, dwarfed as he was by the 6' 5" tall President De Gaulle. Another highlight was the Ploughing Championships in Killarney in 1961, believed to be the first ever Outdoor Show filmed by RTÉ National TV with their outside broadcasting unit. It was filmed on 8 and 9 November 1961 for the first ever episode of the farming programme 'On the Land', and broadcast on 1 January 1962. It featured both Sean and Mrs Grosvenor, the local event organiser, and remarkable in that it was broadcast the day after Teilifís Éireann first went on air. RTÉ Archives released in 2016 a video of Sean as NPA MD at the presentation of the trophy to Farmerette of the Year, Eiline Brennan from Laois, being crowned Queen of the Plough in 1961.

He continued to build on NPA's international potential and in 1964 the NPA sent two competitors to Fuchsenbigl, Near Vienna, Austria, where Ireland won their first World Title. The late Charlie Keegan, from County Wicklow was that winner and it marked a huge Irish International achievement for NPA at that time. He was an inspiration to future competitors, demonstrating that the Irish had the standard and the potential to compete with the best in the World. Arriving home from the World Contest in Vienna, the Wicklow man was proudly brought home to Wicklow on an open top bus, reminiscent of his All Ireland winning bus bringing the cup back home, and who was met by bonfires along the roadside as they greeted NPA's first World Ploughing Champion. That was a special day for Sean, as Wicklow was his adopted county. The Irish Times in 2015 reported how the tractor on which Charlie Keegan won World Ploughing Championships in 1964 restored, a green Deutz D40L tractor has since been restored to its original condition by his grandson, Michael, after 1,000 hours restoration work. At the National Championships 1964, a new Youth class was introduced for Youths 21- 28. In 1965 Esso became an NPA sponsors and introduced the Esso Supreme Trophy which is still presented to the Senior Conventional Champion annually. In 1966 a new competition was introduced to cater for Students from the Agricultural Colleges. In 1969 the Irish Countrywomen's Association (ICA) were invited to give demonstrations in cookery and crafts. This also combined with the introduction of the Country Markets as the ploughing was an ideal venue to sell produce. Sean held that position until his sudden untimely death in 1972. The Kilkenny People in their September 1972 obituary reported that he was NPA's managing director, a member of World Ploughing Organisation and that the graveside oration was delivered by Seán Ó Síocháin, General Secretary of GAA.

== Playing career ==
=== Club ===
Educated in Good Counsel College, New Ross until Intermediate Certificate and where he learned how to play football; and at and St Kieran's College, Kilkenny until Leaving Certificate and where he learned how to play hurling – Sean was probably best known in both Kilkenny GAA & Wicklow GAA hurling arenas as an accomplished county hurler, although he also played football and cricket. Kilkenny was famous for its cricket clubs long before it became famous for its hurlers' achievements and played football at county level until 1911. Sean played club hurling with Carrickshock GAA club, a club founded in 1928 in an amalgamation of local teams to commemorate the Battle of Carrickshock of 1831, an event in history with which his home Kilcurl townland, Knocktopher Village and Ballyhale Parish had important links. The Carrickshock GAA club of that time earned great success in the Kilkenny Senior Hurling Championship, winning the competition seven times – including a record of four county titles in a row between 1940 and 1943 – a record that remained unbroken for 66 years until 2009 when Ballyhale Shamrocks GAA, from the parish of his birth, broke it when winning their 4th title in succession.

=== Inter-County ===
The 1933 All-Ireland Hurling Final was Kilkenny's third successive championship decider. Sean was a member of that team and won his only All-Ireland Senior Hurling Medal that day, as a non-playing substitute, beating Limerick by 1–9 to 0–8 points in Croke Park before an attendance of 45,176, according to 1933 All-Ireland Senior Hurling Championship records. Sean had earlier sustained an ankle injury when beating Galway 5–10 to 3–8 in the All-Ireland Semi-final at Birr Park.

He had also won a Leinster championship medal that year, beating Dublin 7–5 to 5–5. 1933 was also a special year as he also won a medal for what was Kilkenny's first ever National Hurling League win. Although not an officially recognised achievement, that 1933 Kilkenny team was also the first Kilkenny team to have achieved the distinction of winning the All-Ireland championship, their provincial championship and the 1932–33 National Hurling League in the same year, when Kilkenny again defeated Limerick by 3–8 to 1–3 in the final. It was only the second time that any County team had completed the League-Championship double, the first being Cork in 1927. According to All-Ireland Senior Hurling Championship records and statistics, the 1933 Kilkenny All Ireland winning team was one of the teams from only 5 from 13 Counties who have ever successfully defended their All-Ireland Hurling championship title – Kilkenny (13), Cork (12), Tipperary (7), Wexford (1) and Galway (1).

=== Teams ===
Kilkenny GAA were the most successful team of the 1930s, winning 4 (1932, 33, 35, 39) Hurling All Ireland Finals. The 1933 Team included the legendary and 3 times (1932, 1933, 1935) All Ireland medal winning midfielder, Lory Meagher from the Tullaroan GAA Club, widely acclaimed as one of Kilkenny's greatest ever hurlers. The Kilkenny 1933 All-Ireland winners were captained by two-time All-Ireland medal winner (1932, 33), Eddie Doyle of Mooncoin GAA, who had added a third consecutive Leinster medal to his collection of three-in-a-row of senior county titles of 1916, 1917 and 1918 with Mooncoin. Matty Power from the Dicksboro GAA & Garda GAA clubs, the 5 times (1922, 1927, 1932, 1933, 1935) All Ireland medal winner, also played that day, although Matty had played for Dublin when winning his 1927 medal. Notably, Matty's first medal was won in 1922 when beating Tipperary GAA 4–2 to 2–6 but it is extraordinary to record that it took 45 more years, until 1967, before Kilkenny would beat Tipperary in a Championship Final again. Another notable member of that 1933 (winning one of his three winner's medals) All Ireland winning team was Martin White, also from Tullaroan club, who is recorded as the second oldest lived All-Ireland medal winner and who died in 2011, aged 102 years and 73 days; the oldest lived All-Ireland medal winner being Jim Power of Galway GAA who died in 1998, aged 102 years and 195 days. The Limerick GAA team of 1933 that day included the famous Mick Mackey (1912–1982) of the Ahane GAA club who went on to play a key part for Limerick GAA during a golden age for their team, winning three All Ireland medals (captaining twice), five Munster medals and five National Hurling League medals.
