= Kilcurl =

Kilcurl (historically Kylkeryl and Kilkirihill and Kirkirle; from Irish Cill Choirill, Church of St. Cairill) comprises the two townland areas of Kilcurl Anglesey and Kilcurl Feronsby. The townlands are situated one mile (1.6 km) from its nearest village, Knocktopher, and located on a road to Carrickshock monument one mile (1.6 km) away and two miles (3.2 km) to Ballyhale. The village of Knocktopher is situated in the parish of Ballyhale, south County Kilkenny, in Ireland.

Kilcurl is primarily an area of rich farmland, but is also of historical significance due to the presence of a castle at Kilcurl Feronsby, the Tithe War memorial at nearby Carrickshock, the ancient church and graveyard ruins at Kilcurl Anglesey, and an Ogham stone on adjoining lands with Ballyboodan. Its history has been established from extensive records, archives, local historians, recordings and international research.

== History ==
Ancestry.com's Rootsweb references the very large number of historic castles of County Kilkenny including Kilcurl Castle, that number being due to a history dating back to the time of the Cambro-Norman invasion in the late 12th century. They describe Kilcurl Castle as believed to have been built by Treasa Meith for the Purcell family and known to have been forfeited by the Purcells to Oliver Cromwell in the 1640s - when he confiscated most of the lands in Knocktopher Barony, as it was known at that time.

Near Kilcurl is located the Carrickshock monument, known locally as the site of the Battle of Carrickshock (1831). The Kilcurl connection to it has been extensively documented and recorded. Local knowledge was recorded in a documentary by RTÉ national radio station, following their original broadcast in 1983. It captures the local story drawn from social memory, as handed down through the generations. It tells of a time when tithe taxes were being enforced despite difficult harvests and of the peasants' revolt against what was seen as greedy landlords and greedy clergymen.

The first battle took place in Graiguenamanagh on the Carlow-Kilkenny border, but the Carrickshock monument is testimony to what is believed to have been its most important battle. The event's importance was heightened by the major trial that followed in 1832, where local people were successfully defended by Daniel O'Connell.

The trial was accompanied by a gathering that is recorded to have been c.200,000 in Ballyhale, 1832, people called out from across four adjoining counties by the ringing of church bells along the way. The event and gathering are mentioned in correspondence at the Michael Davitt Museum in Mayo. It may have been an inspiration for Daniel O'Connell's famous monster rallies of the 1840s and before the formation of the Irish National Land League, which Davitt co-founded in 1879. Independently, RootsWeb describes the course of the Tithe War (1831–38) as an anti-tithe movement. The social memory aspect of the story, and its accuracy, was the subject of a detailed international study, including the story of the Tracey Clan, by Gary Owens at Huron University College, Ontario, Canada, in 2004.

The ruins of Kilcurl Church of St. Cairill, that gives Kilcurl its name, and its graveyard still remain, with headstones dating back through the 1950s & '60s and to the Battle of Carrickshock of 1831 and earlier. Mocavo's records from The History and Antiquities states that in the Diocese of Ossory Kilcurl Church was another of the old parochial churches granted to the Priory of Kells in the first years of the 13th century by Mathew Fitz Griffin. It was then known as Kyle-Churrl, or the Church of St. Cairill, and as the only saint named Cairill mentioned in the Martyrology of Donegal was "St. Cairill, Bishop, at Tir-Rois", it is presumed he was identical to the Saint of Kilcurl. St Cairill was known to be an Irish missionary to Western Scotland in the 6th century. There are at least two other Cille Choirill churches that are now known - one in Roybridge, Scotland, and a second in Adelaide, Australia. Their connectivity has recently been established back to Cille Choirill in Scotland, but establishing the connection back to Kilcurl in Ireland is ongoing.

== Nearby locations ==
Also nearby is the location of an Ogham Stone, one of only 14 in Kilkenny, and which is recorded by Megalithic Monuments of Ireland as having been discovered in 1841 when standing erect, though now relocated on the same site. They state that it is one of near 400 discovered in Ireland and the western UK, and was found to be composed of grained slate that has been dated back to 700-900 AD by Ziegler. It is 2.31 metres (7.6 ft) in length, 1.75 metres (5.7 ft) in width, and 0.23 metres (0.75 ft) in depth. Local traditions have translated the inscription as "Here lies Corbmac ó Cuinn". That may be Cormac ua Cuinn, meaning "grandson of Conn", and also known as Cormac mac Airt or Cormac Ulfada (long beard) who was, according to medieval Irish legend and historical tradition, a leading High King of Ireland. He is believed to have ruled from Tara c.250 AD and to be the most famous of the ancient High Kings that ruled Ireland from the 2nd to the 4th century.

The Treacy Clan records show that Kilcurl was once well known in Kilkenny's cricket world, in 1884, at a time when the county had over 40 teams, although they had reduced to 20 by 1931. Referring to the History of Cricket in Co. Kilkenny by Michael O'Dwyer (2006) and The Forgotten Game by O'Dwyer Books, College Gardens, Kilkenny - they list Kilcurl teams that beat Knocktopher in 1984 and included J. Carbery, J. Treacy, J. Treacy junior, J. Quinn, D. Treacy, P. Long, P. Power, W. Gorman, M. Scurry, M. Kenny and J. Ryan.
