= Knocktopher =

Village in County Kilkenny, Ireland

Knocktopher Irish: Cnoc an Tóchair
- Village
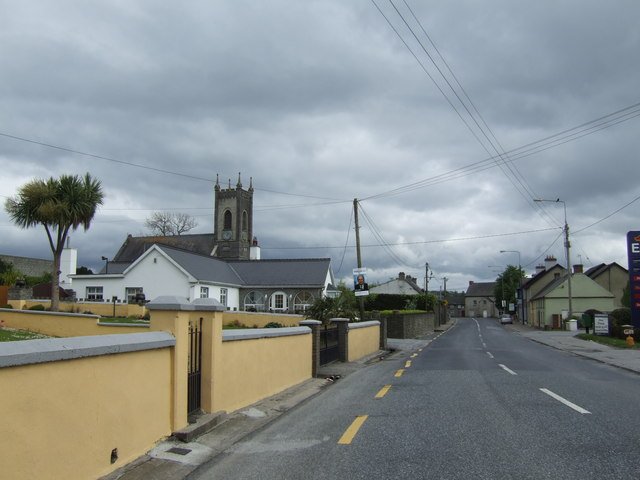
- Approaching the village on the R713 (formerly N10)

- Location in Ireland
- Coordinates: 52°29′00″N 7°13′00″W
- Country: Ireland
- Province: Leinster
- County: County Kilkenny

Population (2022)
  - Total: 174
- Time zone: UTC+0 (WET)
  - Summer (DST): UTC-1 (IST (WEST))

Knocktopher (historically Knocktofer and Knocktover; from Irish Cnoc an Tóchair, Hill of the Causeway) is a village in County Kilkenny, Ireland. It is situated on the R713 road between the villages of Stoneyford to the north, and Ballyhale to the south. It was formerly situated on the N10 national route until being bypassed by the M9 motorway. It is also a civil parish in the eponymous barony of Knocktopher.

The village has two pubs, two shops, a petrol station, a three star hotel, a restaurant and a glass gallery.

== History ==
An ogham stone was erected about a mile south of Knocktopher in the medieval period: see Ballyboodan Ogham Stone. A mile to the west was Sheepstown Church.

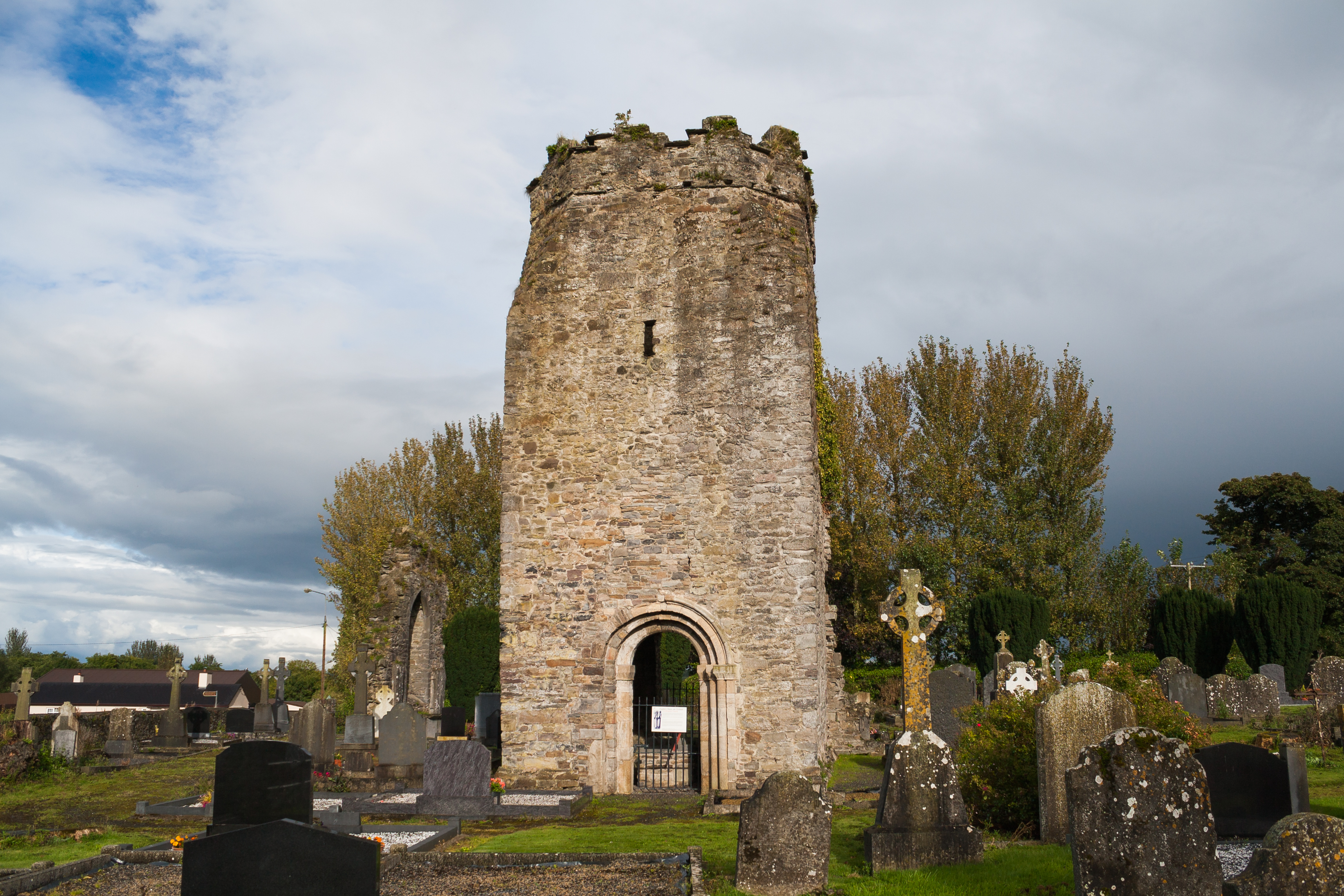
Knocktopher Church and Cemetery 2017 09 13

In 1312 it was listed as having four farmers holding between 5 and 74 acres of arable land, and 45 free tenants holding from as much as 2,520 acres of arable land all the way down to a one-house plot. Ninety-seven burgesses held 360 acres of arable land, and there was a settlement of betaghs farming 120 acres of arable land. Knocktopher was home to a monastery, built in 1356 by James Butler, 2nd Earl of Ormond for the Carmelite friars. Following the implementation in Ireland of the dissolution of the monasteries in 1542, it was acquired by the Kingsland branch of the Barnewall family, who later acquired the title Viscount Barnewall. Its only remains are part of a residence built upon the site. The Carmelites returned to Knocktopher in 1735, where they remain to this day.

Following the Norman invasion of Ireland, the Barony of Knocktopher was created. The first baron was said to be Griffin FitzWilliam, brother of Raymond le Gros known as Raymond FitzGerald. Gilbert fitz Griffin is cited as the 2nd Baron of Knocktopher and first owner of Knocktopher Manor. He died about 1203/4. In the early fourteenth century, Knocktopher was owned by a certain Amicia and (successively) her two husbands, Nigel le Brun and Walter de Cusack; Nigel and Amicia had bought it from Sir Walter de la Haye, Justiciar of Ireland, in about 1310. By the 15th century, the family of "Walsh of the Mountain" held half of the land in this barony. The lands are believed to have included the castles at Ballyhale, Ballynacooly, Ballynoony, Castlebanny, Castlegannon, Castlemorris, Clonassy, Cloone, Derrynahinch, Earlsrath, Inchacarran, Knockmoylan, Lismateige, and Manselscourt as well as civil parishes of Killahy, Kilbeacon, Listerlin, Rossinan, Muckalee, Aghaviller and Kilkeasy. Their lands were said to have been confiscated by Oliver Cromwell, c.1640, by which time the Walsh families owned much of the southern Knocktopher lands. Most of the remainder of the Barony was then owned by the Earl Of Ormond. In the census of 1659, the total number of Irish in the Barony of Knocktopher was recorded as 1301.

Knocktopher Abbey was established by the Normans in the 13th Century and was subsequently acquired with its lands by the Langrishe family. Today it is a time-share resort.

Prior to the coming into force of the Acts of Union on 1 January 1801, Knocktopher was a two-member borough constituency in the Irish House of Commons.

=== Sport ===
It has a football club, Southend United.

Its hurling club is Ballyhale Shamrocks. Knocktopher GAA Hurling Club amalgamated with Ballyhale Shamrocks and Knockmoylan GAA Clubs in 1972. The late Fr Anthony Heaslip, brother of Knocktopher man, Denis Heaslip, was credited with being central to the founding of Ballyhale Shamrocks. Since 1981 to date they have since won a national record number of 8 All Ireland Senior Club Hurling Championships.

Three Knocktopher-born hurlers have won Senior Hurling All Ireland medals with Kilkenny - Frank Cummins won in 1967 (non-playing sub), 1969, 1972, 1974, 1975, 1979, 1982, 1983, Denis Heaslip won in 1957, 1963 and Sean O' (John) Farrell won in 1933 (non-playing sub) who played club hurling for Carrickshock GAA at that time - a club founded in 1928 when the teams from Hugginstown and Knockmoylan were amalgamated to commemorate the Battle of Carrickshock, 1831.

Sporting achievements are not new to Knocktopher. According to Art Kavanagh's book, Mary Langrishe, sister of Sir Hercules Robert Langrishe (1859–1943), the 5th Baronet, was the Irish Lawn Tennis Ladies Champion on three occasions during the 1880s.

Knocktopher Footballers won the Kilkenny Senior Football Championship four times – 1901, 1908, 1910 and 1911. In their booklet to celebrate the Ballyhale C.D.S. (1895-1995) Cooperative Creamery anniversary, they carried a photo of the Knocktopher football 1908-1910 squad and noted that Knocktopher were the backbone of the County Kilkenny football team of 1911, the year they won the Leinster Senior Football Championship, beating Kildare. They were beaten in the All-Ireland Football Semi-final by Antrim that year, a feat never since surpassed by Kilkenny footballers. One of their best-known footballers of that time was Patrick J. Power, who was Manager of Ballyhale Creamery (1909-1920), and also represented Knocktopher in the Kilkenny team of 1911.

The Treacy Clan record that Knocktopher had a well-known Cricket Team in 1884, among the best-known players being batsman, W. Power, and bowler, D. Treacy; that local competitors included teams from Ballyhale, Kilcurl, Knockmoylan, Hugginstown and Kilmoganny; and that the matches often took place on a cricket ground provided by Langrishes at Knocktopher Abbey. There were over 40 cricket teams in County Kilkenny at the time.

=== Ploughing Championships ===
Other notable events included holding the National Ploughing Championships in Knocktopher in 1978. Kilcurl born Sean (John) O'Farrell was managing director of its Irish National Ploughing Association from 1958 to 1972.

== Public transport ==
The village is served on Thursday only by Bus Éireann route 365 from Thomastown to Waterford. However Ballyhale only 2 kilometres distant has numerous daily Bus Éireann and JJ Kavanagh and Sons services linking it to Dublin, Waterford, Kilkenny, Thomastown and Athlone. Thomastown railway station is approximately 9 kilometres from Knocktopher. The village is easily accessed from Junction 10 on the M9 making travel to Dublin, Kilkenny and Waterford.

== See also ==
- List of abbeys and priories in Ireland (County Kilkenny)
- List of towns and villages in Ireland
