= National Ploughing Championships =

Annual agricultural contest and exhibition in Ireland

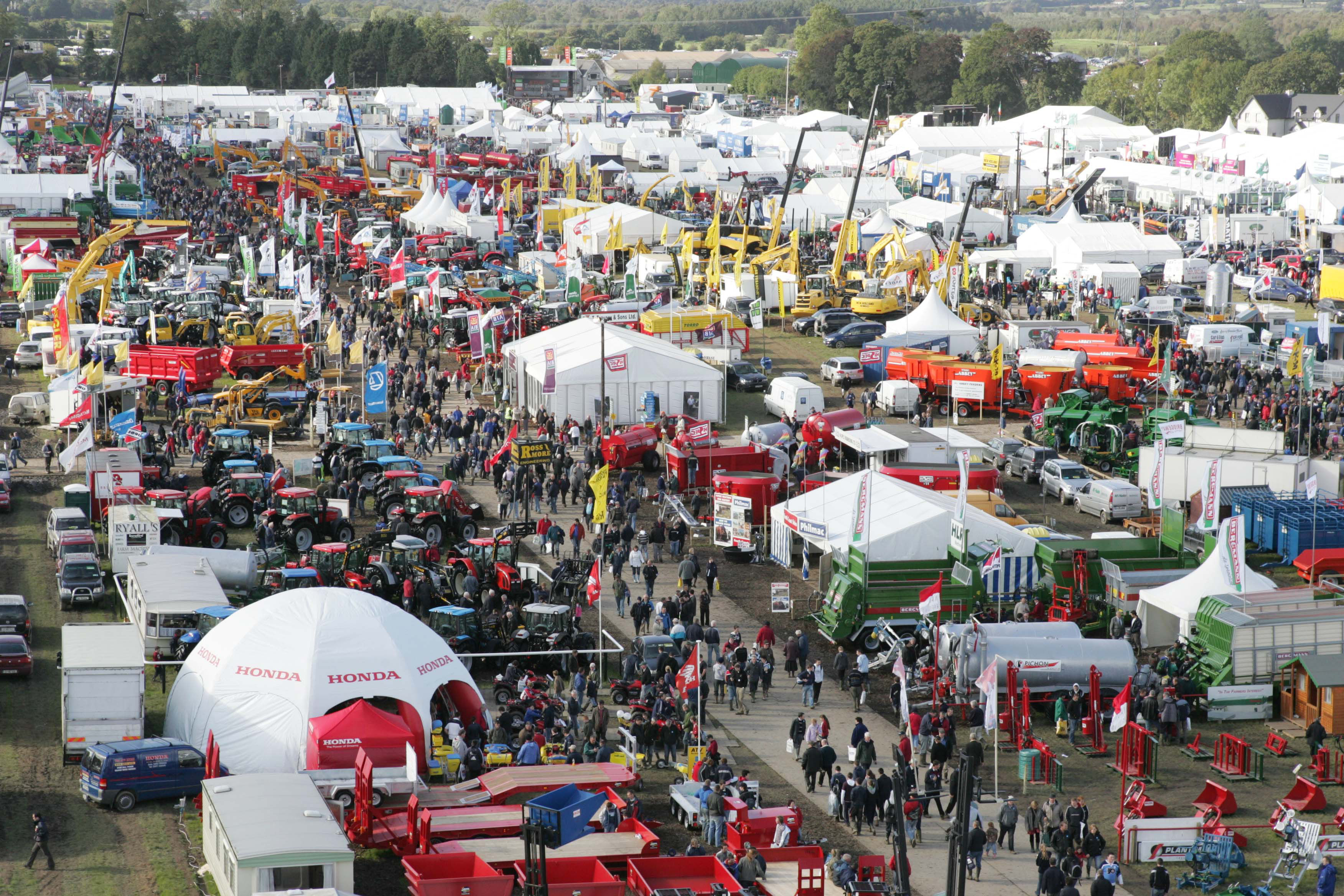
- Stands at the National Ploughing Championships in Tullamore, County Offaly, 2007
- Status: Active
- Genre: Agriculture
- Venue: Varies
- Locations: Screggan, Tullamore, County Offaly (2025)
- Country: Ireland
- Inaugurated: 1931
- Attendance: 243,000 (2026)
- Organizer: National Ploughing Association
- Website: npa.ie

The National Ploughing Championships (Irish: Comórtas Náisiúnta Treabhdóireachta) or NPC or the Ploughing, previously known as The National Ploughing Championships Machinery & Livestock Exhibition, is an outdoor agricultural show in Ireland incorporating a ploughing contest held every September.

== Competition classes ==
There are distinct categories of horse drawn and tractor ploughing, as well as for the use of reversible ploughs.

Ancillary events such as pole climbing competitions have also taken place as part of the Championships.

== History ==
The first Irish inter-county ploughing contest was held between County Wexford and County Kildare on 16 February, 1931 in a 26-acre field at Coursetown in Athy in County Kildare. Since then, the National Ploughing Championships has expanded to over 800 acres with 1,700 exhibitors. It has been extended beyond displays relating to ploughing, farming and machinery and now includes a tented trade village, live entertainment and music, fashion shows, a craft village, cooking demonstrations, sheep dog trials, pony games, and other activities.

In 2014, the event attracted what was then a record of 279,500 visitors, rising to 281,000 in 2015, 283,000 in 2016 and 291,500 in 2017. In 2019, it drew over 1,700 exhibitors and had 297,000 visitors. 225,500 attended the 2025 edition in Screggan, Offaly.

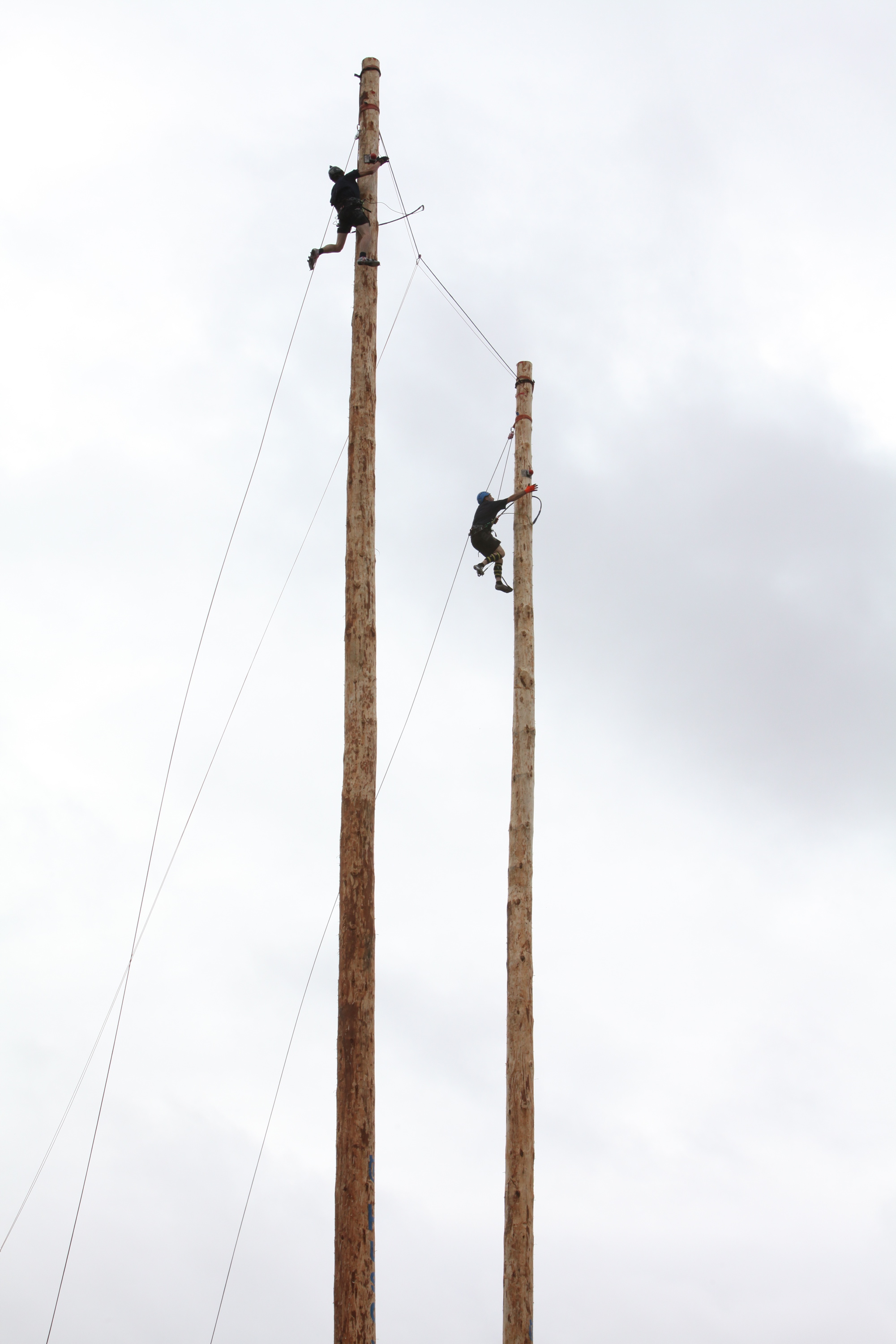
All Ireland Pole climbing competition at the National Ploughing Championships in 2011

=== Foundation ===
The original mission statement for the National Ploughing Association, the body which organises the event, was set out as bringing "the message of good ploughing to all parts of the country and to provide a pleasant and friendly place to meet and do business".

One of the co-founders of the Association, JJ Bergin, became its first managing director. In 1952, he represented Ireland at the first meeting of the World Ploughing Organisation (WPO) and was appointed their vice president. The first world contest was hosted by Canada in 1953, and the second was in Killarney, County Kerry, Ireland in 1954. Ten countries competed in the 1954 event, which was the first ploughing competition in which women competed. The winner of this 'Farmerette' class was known as 'Queen of the Plough'. In 1955, the National Ploughing Championships expanded into a 2-day event. The association became a limited liability company and was incorporated on 2 March 1956.

JJ Bergin continued to manage NPA until his death in 1958. Upon his death, the NPA appointed hurler Seán O'Farrell as managing director, a role he held until his death in 1972. A national bread baking competition was introduced by NPA in co-operation with ESB in 1958 that continues to this day. In 1959, O'Farrell represented the NPA at the 7th World Ploughing Contest to Armoy, County Antrim, Northern Ireland. He later attended the 8th World Ploughing Contest in Tor Mancina, Rome, Italy in 1960, where he presented a block of Kilkenny Marble as Ireland's contribution to Rome's 'Cairn of Peace'. During O'Farrell's tenure in office, he representing Ireland at the 9th (1961) World Ploughing Contest, at Thiverval-Grignon in France. He was officially introduced to President of the French Republic, Charles De Gaulle. Also in 1961, the Ploughing Championships (at Killarney) were filmed for the first time by RTÉ. It was filmed on 8 and 9 November 1961 and broadcast in the first ever episode of the farming programme 'On the Land', on 1 January 1962. The film was notable in that it was broadcast the day after Teilifís Éireann first went on air.

In 1964, the NPA sent two competitors to Fuchsenbigl, near Vienna, Austria, where Ireland won their first World Title when Charlie Keegan, from County Wicklow, was the winner. Arriving home from the world contest in Vienna, the Wicklow man was welcomed home to Enniskerry, County Wicklow on an open top bus and met by bonfires along the roadside as they greeted NPA's first World Ploughing Champion. The Irish Times reported how the tractor on which Charlie Keegan won World Ploughing Championships in 1964 had now been restored. It was a green Deutz D40L tractor that was restored to its original condition by his grandson.

At the National Championships 1964, a new Youth class was introduced for Youths 21–28. In 1965 Esso became an NPA sponsor and introduced the Esso Supreme Trophy which is still presented to the Senior Conventional Champion annually. In 1966, a new competition was introduced to cater for students from the agricultural colleges. In 1969, the Irish Countrywomen's Association (ICA) were invited to give demonstrations in cookery and crafts. O'Farrell held the position of MD until his death in 1972. The Kilkenny People, in their September 1972 obituary, recorded that he was NPA Managing Director and a member of World Ploughing Organisation and that the graveside oration was delivered by Seán Ó Síocháin, General Secretary of GAA.

=== Later years ===
In 1973, Anna May McHugh was appointed NPA's managing director. McHugh had previously served as secretary of the NPA. In September 2015, National Ploughing Association Managing Director Anna May McHugh was awarded the Officier de l'Ordre du Mérite Agricole by the French Ambassador to Ireland Mr Jean-Pierre Thébault. McHugh is the Irish board member to the Board of the World Ploughing Organisation, where her daughter, Anna Marie McHugh, is now general secretary.

In 1973, the year of McHugh's appointment as managing director, the 20th World Ploughing Contest was held in County Wexford. It was a four-day contest that was attended by 100,000 people, and in which 25 countries took part. Further World Ploughing events have since been held in Ireland with 29th World Ploughing Contest in Wexford in 1981; the 43rd World Ploughing Contest at Oak Park, County Carlow in 1996 and the 53rd World Ploughing Contest at Tullow County Carlow in 2006. In 1994, Martin Kehoe from County Wexford won the first of his three World Champion titles – in 1994 from Outram, near Dunedin, New Zealand; in 1995 from Egerton, Njoro, Kenya and in 1999 from Pomacle, France. The only other Irish World Champion (apart from first winner, Charlie Keegan) was Eamonn Tracey, winning in Saint Jean D'Illac, France in 2014.

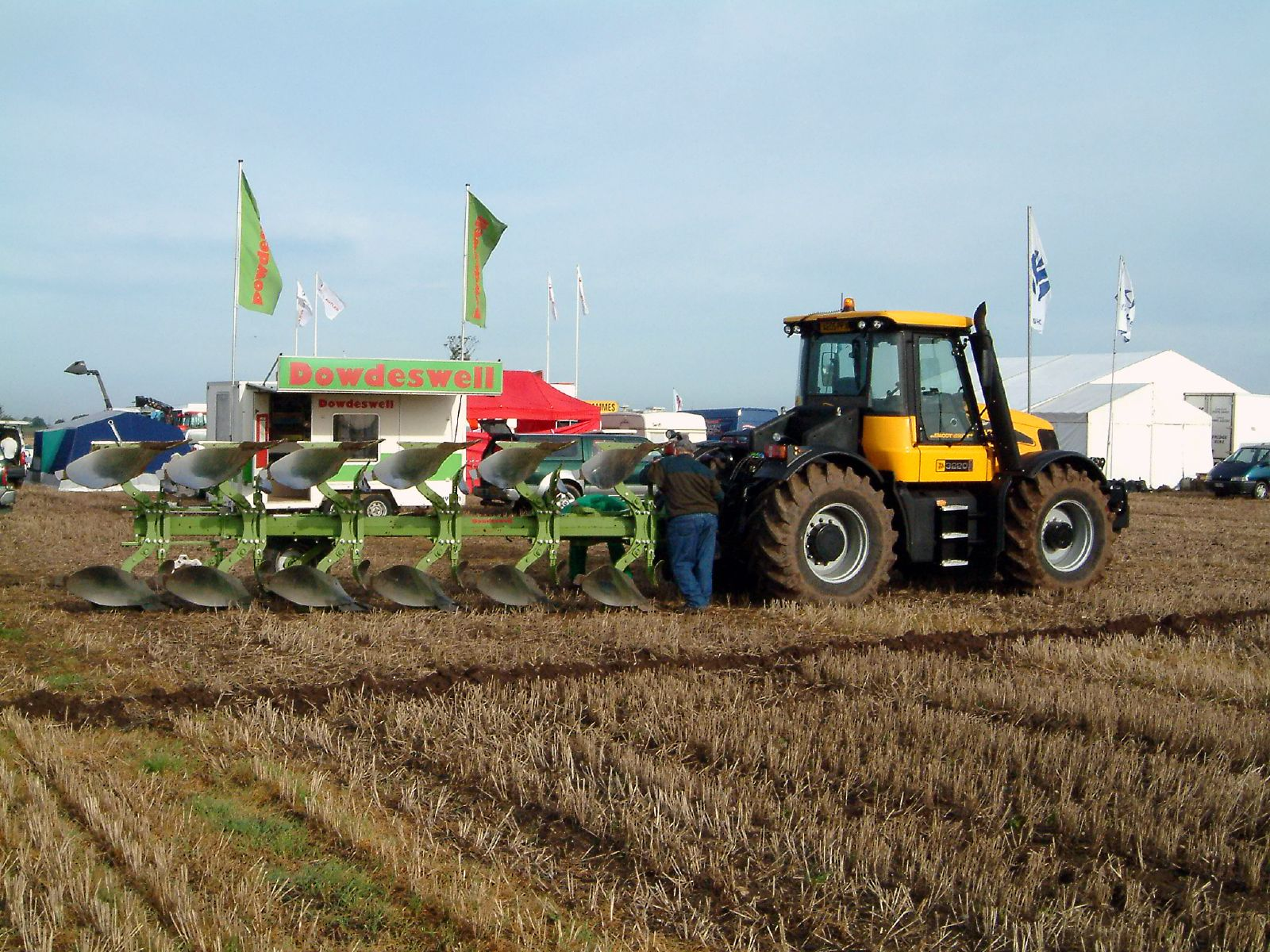
The 2005 event was held in Mogeely, County Cork

By 2014, the event had become one of the largest outdoor annual events in Europe. NPA records indicate that, in 1975, the number of national exhibitors was 100, the number of counties competing was 21 and the number of demonstrators was 18. By 1978, the championships returned to County Kilkenny - this time to the village where Anna May McHugh's predecessor, Seán O'Farrell, was born, Knocktopher. Attendance figures grew steadily throughout the 1970s and 1980s until 1988, when the event was expanded to 3 days in order to cater for heavy traffic due to escalating attendances. According to NPA records, the Irish Countrywomen's Association and Country Markets started giving cookery and craft demonstrations at the shows around this time. Other events added in the 1980s included a fashion show in 1981, shopping and business arcades in 1985 and the 'Nissan Classic' in 1989.

Between 2000 and 2011, the Ploughing Championships had grown to 180,000 spectators, 320 competitors, 1,100 exhibitors, 14 shopping arcades and was by then generating €10m for the local Irish economy.

National Ploughing Championships 2026 in Screggan, County Offaly

As of 2014/2015, the event's costs were in the region of €3.5 million, and there were ploughing associations in every county in Ireland.

With an average of 180,000 spectators, the NPA attendance has grown from the 3,000 that attended in 1932 to over 280,000 in the 2010s. Some outlets have described the National Ploughing Championships as a "flagship event in Irish agriculture" and as "the biggest outdoor exhibition and agricultural trade show in Europe".

The 2020 event was cancelled as part of the response to the COVID-19 pandemic in Ireland. The 2021 event went ahead on a much scaled-back level, with the trade exhibition element and the world ploughing contest cancelled due to uncertainty over COVID-19 restrictions. The 2022 event returned as normal with a new attendance record of 115,500 on 21 September. In 2023, Macra na Feirme organised a successful world record attempt to throw the most wellies simultaneously.
