= Ballyhale =

Village in County Kilkenny, Ireland

Ballyhale Baile Héil
- Village
- Location in Ireland
- Coordinates: 52°28′2.175″N 7°12′1.816″W
- Irish Grid Reference: S 54 35
- Country: Ireland
- Province: Leinster
- County: County Kilkenny
- Barony: Knocktopher

Population (2022)
  - Total: 184
- Time zone: UTC±00:00 (GMT (WET))
  - Summer (DST): UTC+01:00 (IST (WEST))

Ballyhale (Irish: Baile Héil) is a village in County Kilkenny, Ireland. It is located south of the city of Kilkenny, about halfway to Waterford.

The sport of hurling is popular in the area, and the local Gaelic Athletic Association team of Ballyhale Shamrocks are the most successful hurling club in All-Ireland Senior Club Hurling Championship history. Local Kilkenny GAA hurler Henry Shefflin holds the record for the highest number of All Ireland Senior Hurling medals for a single player.

The location is also close to the Mount Juliet golf course in nearby Thomastown. The food brand Glanbia, originally Avonmore, had its roots in a number of member-owned creameries, before becoming a global showcase co-op brand for Irish agriculture. Ballyhale is also home to Kiltorcan's Old Quarry. Ballyhale also played a historic role when, in 1832, approximately 200,000 people from four counties gathered in support of those on trial for the 1831 Battle of Carrickshock.

The parish of Ballyhale is made up of three areas; Knockmoylan and the villages of Ballyhale and Knocktopher. The population of the Ballyhale district is 335.

== Toponymy ==
The anglicised Ballyhale comes from the Irish: Baile Héil, meaning 'Hale's Town or Howel's Town', Carrigan 1905 states that the name is derived from the Walshes among whom Hale or Howl is known to have been a Christian name. However, John Howell is recorded in the barony in 1411, and "Edmund Howling of Ballyheale" forfeited the townland of Ballyhale in 1653 and was transplanted to Connaught.

Historically the name have been spelt in a variety of ways including; Howelleston, Ballyhaele, Ballihowell, and Baile Haeil. In 1802 Tighe recorded ballyhale as a small village with "little more than twelve houses", permission of a fair, and a ruin of Roman Catholic chapel. By 1851 the town is recorded as Ballyhale town. By 1985 the post office address was Ballyhale, or Baile Héil. The village gives its name to the wider townland of Ballyhale, and to the Ballyhale electoral district which is one of 113 in the county.

== History ==
=== Avonmore Cooperative Federation ===
2016 marks the 50th anniversary of County Kilkenny Village Creameries amalgamating to create the Avonmore Creameries agricultural brand that eventually emerged from the Federation formed in 1966. The Coop entity went on to become Avonmore Food plc in 1988 and to later join with Waterford Food plc in 1997. It is today known as the global Food giant, Glanbia, one of the world's top nutrition companies with revenues of over €3.5 billion and 5,815 employees.

Ballyhale Creamery was founded in 1895, the year after the founding of The Irish Agricultural Organisation Society (IAOS /ICOS today) that began the cooperative movement in earnest in Ireland. In 1995, Ballyhale celebrated the 100th anniversary of their Creamery's founding with a booklet of its history to mark the occasion. The Ballyhale C.D.S. booklet records that a federation of 25 Co-op Creameries originally emerged in January 1965 under the umbrella of Avonmore Creameries Ltd., with their chairman, John Joe Kearns, acting as their representative on the Avonmore Council; where shares were taken in the new entity by the society and that in following years a Ballyragget milk processing factory was built. The first bulk milk collections tool place from 1973, when the amalgamation was formalised. Ballyhale became one of 20 members of Avonmore Farmers Ltd.; the other founding members being Castlehale, Mullinavat, Iverk, Piltown, Carrigeen, Kilmacow, Ballyragget, South Tipperary, Monastarevan, Muckalee, Barrowvale, Kells, Windgap, Brandonvale, Bennetsbridge, Castlecomer, Freshford, Donaghmore and Fennor.

In 1966 Ballyhale Co-Operative Creamery Dairy Society Ltd., formed by local farmers, had joined with other small rural co-operative societies from Kilkenny and some neighbouring counties and, together with Unigate Limited support, formed the Avonmore Creameries Federation Realising the benefits of increased scale and greater diversification in the 1960s, they saw the need for an amalgamation of many small, locally focused co-operatives across Ireland. It led to the construction of a new multi-purpose Avonmore dairy plant facility in Ballyragget, County Kilkenny, and a Plant they claimed was the biggest food processing facility in Europe at that time. Today that giant global entity is known as Glanbia. Glanbia has its origins in the Irish agricultural co-operative movement that evolved over the last century since first Irish Co-operative in 1889, founded by Horace Plunkett. Ireland entered the Common Market in 1970.

According to Ballyhale CDS anniversary booklet of 1995, the Coop movement in Ireland, which had begun with one society of 50 members in 1889, had grown rapidly to 67 societies with 3,800 members by 1895 and in 1896 Ballyhale C.D.S. became one of its first 110 societies with 10,000 members. The ICOS organisation now has member co-ops and associated companies with 150,000 individual members, and 12,000 employees in Ireland, a further 24,000 abroad, and combined turnover of €12 billion.

And today Glanbia has operations in 34 countries and is exporting to more than 100 countries worldwide. Glanbia plc was formed in 1997 out of the merger of Avonmore Foods plc and Waterford Foods plc. Glanbia was ranked by revenue (2010 figures) in the top 100 Cooperatives, No 98 in the world and No 1 in Ireland by the International Co-operative Alliance, the global apex organisation of co-operatives worldwide.

According to Glanbia Collections in Kilkenny Archives at St Kieran's College, Kilkenny, the Avonmore Coop brand was created through the merger of over 30 Village Creameries that are now included among their archives, and available for public viewing.

=== Kiltorcan Old Quarry ===
Ballyhale is known locally for its Kiltorcan Old Quarry, a sandstone quarry and a site claimed to be of international importance. It is reputed to be 400 million years old, and known internationally for its discovery of fossil ferns since 1853, some pieces of which are on display in The Natural History Museum (Ireland) in Dublin and Rothe House Museum, Kilkenny. The Quarry was opened commercially in the 1980s. According to by local authorities, in Kilkenny County Council's Plans for Ballyhale, Kiltorcan Old Quarry of sandstone was designated as an "area of specific interest" in 2002.

=== Battle of Carrickshock ===
In 1832, the importance Gathering of c.200,000 people at Ballyhale for the trial of those charged in aftermath of The Battle of Carrickshock, otherwise known as the Carrickshock incident, is acknowledged by researcher Gary Owens of University of Huron, Ontario, Canada as having a significant influence on its overall outcome for anti-tithe movement, known as the Tithe War ensuring that the event marked the beginning of the end of tithes in Ireland. Those charged were successfully defended by Daniel O'Connell, called the Liberator of the Nation, and who addressed the gathering in Irish. It was the first 'monster meeting' of that time. Such peaceful gatherings were to become the hallmark of the Young Ireland and Repeal Movement that was founded in 1839 and which peaked with Daniel O’Connell's oration at Tara, 1843, where c.750,000 gathered. Michael Davitt's Museum records show that the Land League campaigns, co-founded in 1879, followed that path too to ensure that it enabled tenant farmers to be able to own the land on which they worked.

== Geography ==
Historical population
Year	Pop.	±%
2011	137	—
2016	174	+27.0%
2022	184	+5.7%

Ballyhale is in the barony Knocktopher, and the civil parish of Derrynahinch. The village gives its name to the wider townland and catholic parish. The Catholic Parish of Ballyhale is made up of three areas; Knockmoylan and the villages of Ballyhale and Knocktopher. Ballyhale Electoral Division (an area which extends to several townlands beyond the village) had a population of 366 people as of 2011, representing a 11.2% increase in population from the 2006 census. The 2020 population of the Electoral Division included 179 males and 187 females.

The Catholic Parish of Ballyhale is made up of three areas; Knockmoylan and the villages of Ballyhale and Knocktopher. Knocktopher and Knockmoylan are two of the parishes that make up Ballyhale. Ballyhale lies in the Church of Ireland diocese of United Dioceses of Cashel and Ossory, the diocese is in the ecclesiastical province of Dublin. Ballyhale was in the Poor Law Union of Waterford.

A small stream flows through Ballyhale before joining the Little Arrigle River in Kiltorcan.

== Tourism ==
Ballyhale's main tourist attraction is the Jack Nicklaus designed Mount Juliet Golf & Spa Hotel golf course at nearby Thomastown. It was the venue for the 2002 WGC-American Express Championship, and also in 2004 WGC-American Express Championship having previously hosted the PGA European Tour Irish Open on three occasions between 1993 and 1995. Other tourist sites in the area include the medieval Ballyhale Castle & Chapel (also protected since 2002), and two protected ringforts (Rath/ Castle) which are located to the east of the town.

== Sport ==
=== GAA ===
Ballyhale Shamrocks GAA is the local Gaelic Athletic Association club, having amalgamated with Knocktopher GAA Hurling Club and Knockmoylan GAA Clubs in 1972. Ballyhale Shamrocks is the most successful hurling club in the All-Ireland Senior Club Hurling Championship competition's history, having won the championship eight times - won in 2020, 2019, 2015, 2010, 2007, 1990, 1984 and 1981. The List of All-Ireland Senior Hurling Championship medal winners shows Ballyhale's Henry Shefflin as holder of the Irish record for highest number of All Ireland Senior Hurling medals for a single player (10) with Kilkenny county team – won in 2000, 2002, 2003, 2006, 2007, 2008, 2009, 2011, 2012 and 2014. Other Ballyhale All Ireland Senior Hurling medal winners were Michael Fennelly as holder eight- 2006 (sub), 2007, 2008 (sub), 2009, 2011, 2012, 2014, 2015; T.J. Reid as holder of seven - 2007(sub), 2008, 2009, 2011, 2012, 2014, 2015; James "Cha" Fitzpatrick as holder of five - in 2006, 2007, 2008, 2009 (sub) and 2011 (sub); Colin Fennelly as holder of three - 2011, 2012, 2014; Ger Fennelly as holder of three -1979, 1982, 1983; Liam Fennelly as holder of three - 1982, 1983, 1992, Kevin Fennelly as holder of one - 1979 and Richie Reid as holder of one - 1979.

Ballyhale Hurlers won the Kilkenny Senior Hurling Championship on 16 occasions - 1978, 1979, 1980, 1982, 1983, 1985, 1988, 1989, 1991, 2006, 2007, 2008, 2009, 2012, 2014, 2018. That included four-in-a-row (2006-9)which matched the 66-year-old record held by Carrickshock GAA since their (1940-3) four-in-a-row.

Ballyhale Footballers won the Kilkenny Senior Football Championship on 3 occasions - in 1979, 1980 and 1982.

=== Other sports ===
Kilkenny, an eventing horse ridden by James C. Wofford in the 1968 and 1972 Olympic Games, was bred by William Dempsey of Ballyhale.

The Treacy Clan records show that Ballyhale had a well-known Cricket Team in 1884, quoting M. Barron as promising to be the most distinguished cricketer in the Ballyhale club of the day; when local competitors included teams from Knocktopher, Kilcurl, Knockmoylan, Hugginstown and Kilmoganny; and that the matches were often played on a cricket ground provided by Langrishes at Knocktopher Abbey. There were over 40 cricket teams in County Kilkenny at the time, reducing to 20 by 1931.

== Education ==
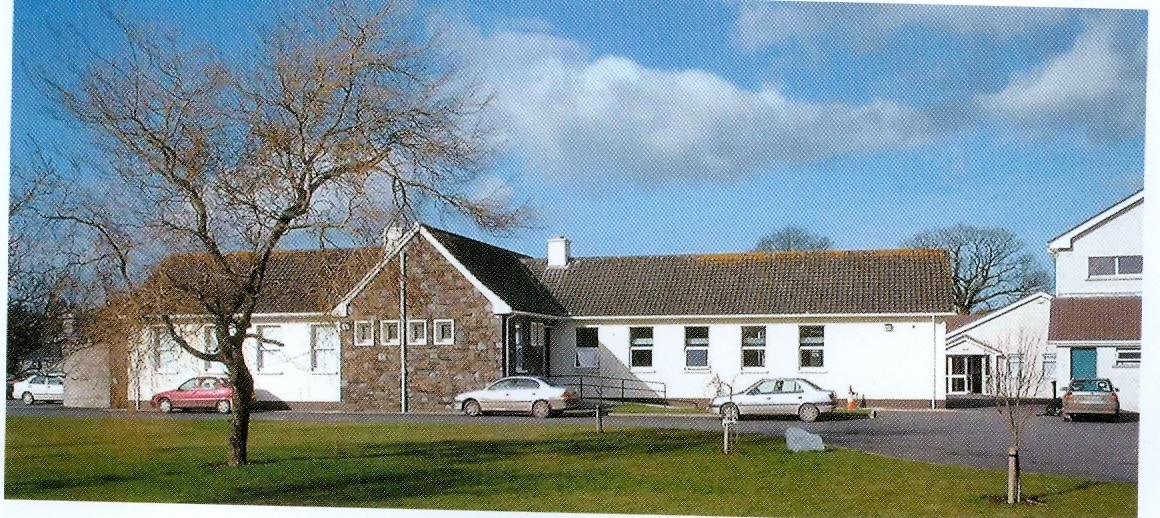
Scoil Aireagail

Scoil Phádraig is a mixed primary school located in the southern part of Ballyhale on the R448 road towards Waterford. The old school building was built in 1948 and a new school building was added to this in 1993, with six classrooms. In 2006 the school won a Green Flag for recycling and environmental awareness.

Scoil Aireagail, a mixed secondary school, is also located in the parish.

== Transport ==
=== Rail transport ===
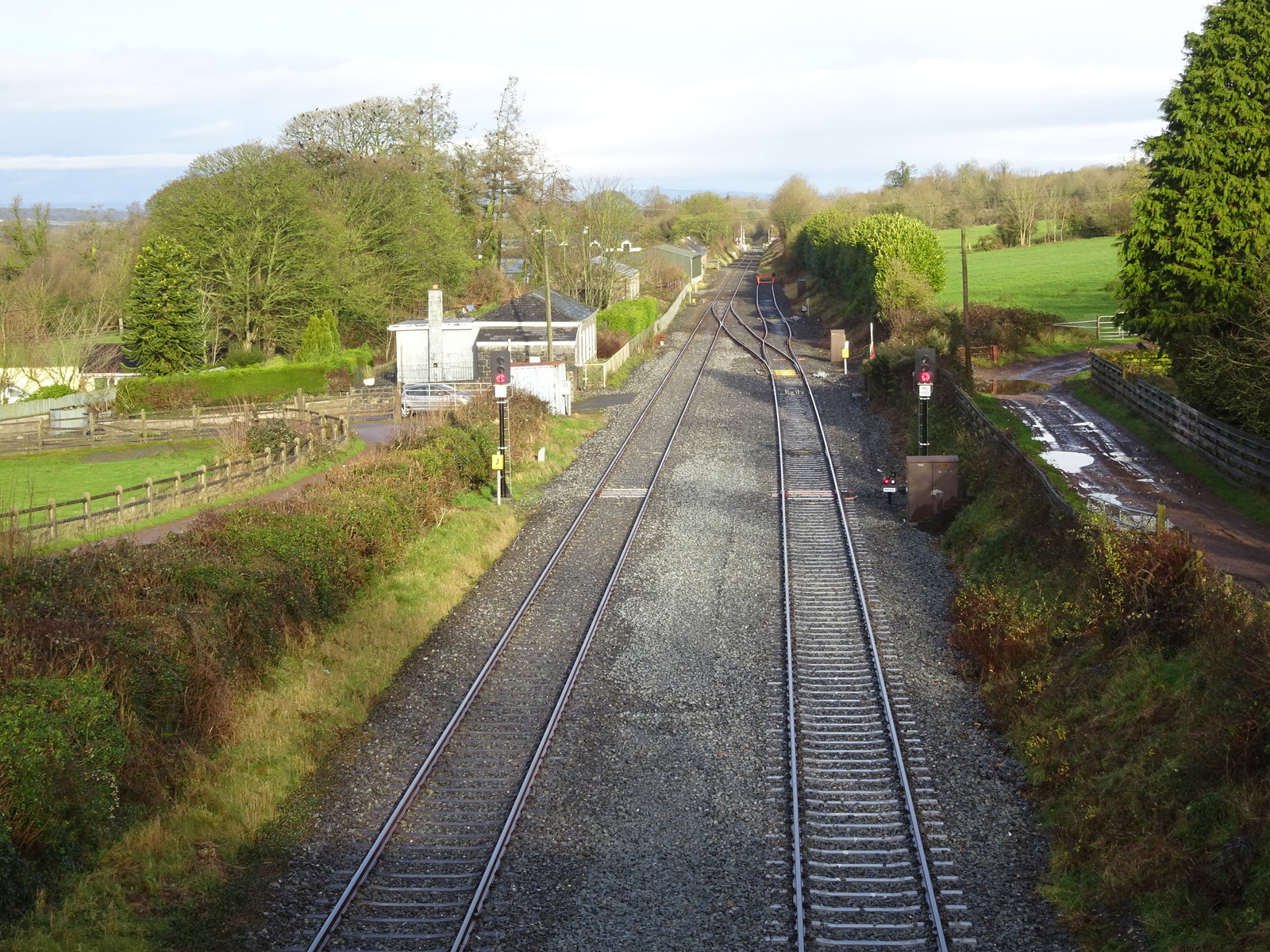
Former site of Ballyhale railway station

Ballyhale railway station, on the Dublin-Waterford railway line, opened on 20 May 1853, but finally closed on 1 January 1963.

=== Bus transport ===
Ballyhale is a stop on the Bus Éireann Waterford - Carlow - Dublin - Dublin Airport route 4. There are several daily services on the route. Ballyhale is also served daily by the Bus Éireann Waterford - Athlone route 73 and on Thursday by the Waterford - Knocktopher - Thomastown local route number 365.

== See also ==
- List of towns and villages in Ireland
- List of townlands in County Kilkenny
