= R701 road =

R701 road may refer to:

- R701 road (Ireland)
- R701 road (South Africa)
