= Dunnamaggin =

Dunnamaggin Dún Iomagáin
- Village
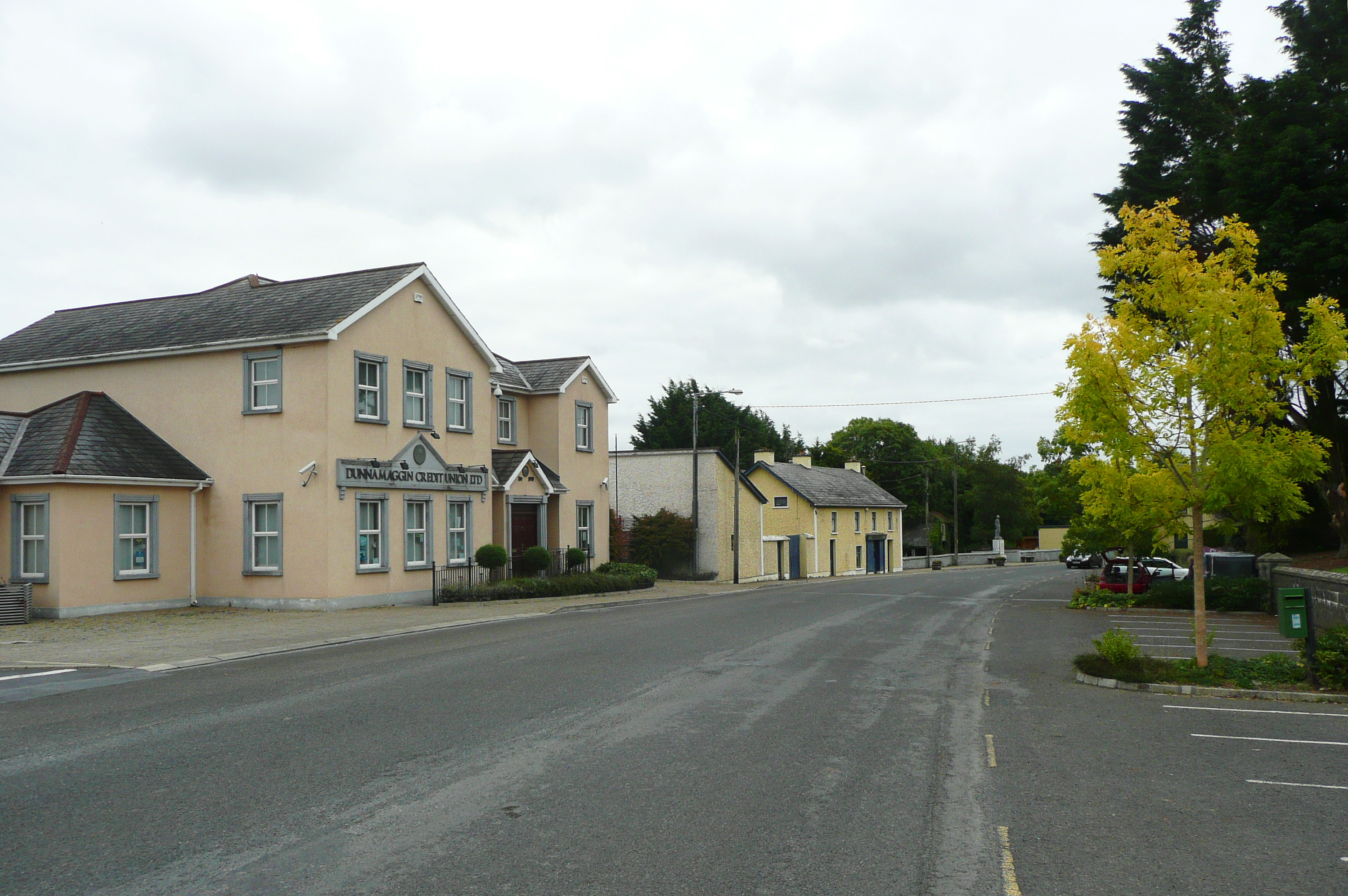
- Dunnamaggin, on the R699 road

- Location in Ireland
- Coordinates: 52°30′11″N 7°18′01″W
- Country: Ireland
- Province: Leinster
- County: County Kilkenny
- Time zone: UTC+0 (WET)
  - Summer (DST): UTC-1 (IST (WEST))
- Irish Grid Reference: S4754939300
- Website: dkk.ie

Dunnamaggin (officially Dunnamaggan; Irish: Dún Iomagáin, meaning 'Fort of Iomagán') is a small village in the south County Kilkenny, Ireland, on the R699 road between Callan and Knocktopher, east of its intersection with the R697 between Kells and Kilmoganny. Dunnamaggan gives its name to a civil parish, an electoral division, and the townlands of Dunnamaggan East and West.

Dunnamaggin has a national school, St Leonard's National School. It gives its name to the Catholic parish, which also includes the villages of Kilmoganny and Kells. Dunnamaggin GAA club, based on the Catholic parish, has its ground in Dunnamaggin.

== Name ==
In the nineteenth century Eugene O'Curry and John O'Donovan both rendered the name into Irish as Dún na mBogán "Fort of the [softness]", the last word interpreted by O'Curry as "soft eggs" and by O'Donovan as "bogs".
