= Carrickshock =

Carrickshock is a hamlet in County Kilkenny which gives its name to:

- Carrickshock Commons, a nearby townland
- Carrickshock GAA, local hurling club
- Carrickshock incident, affray on 14 December 1831 in which 17 people were killed
