= Ploughing match =

Agricultural competition

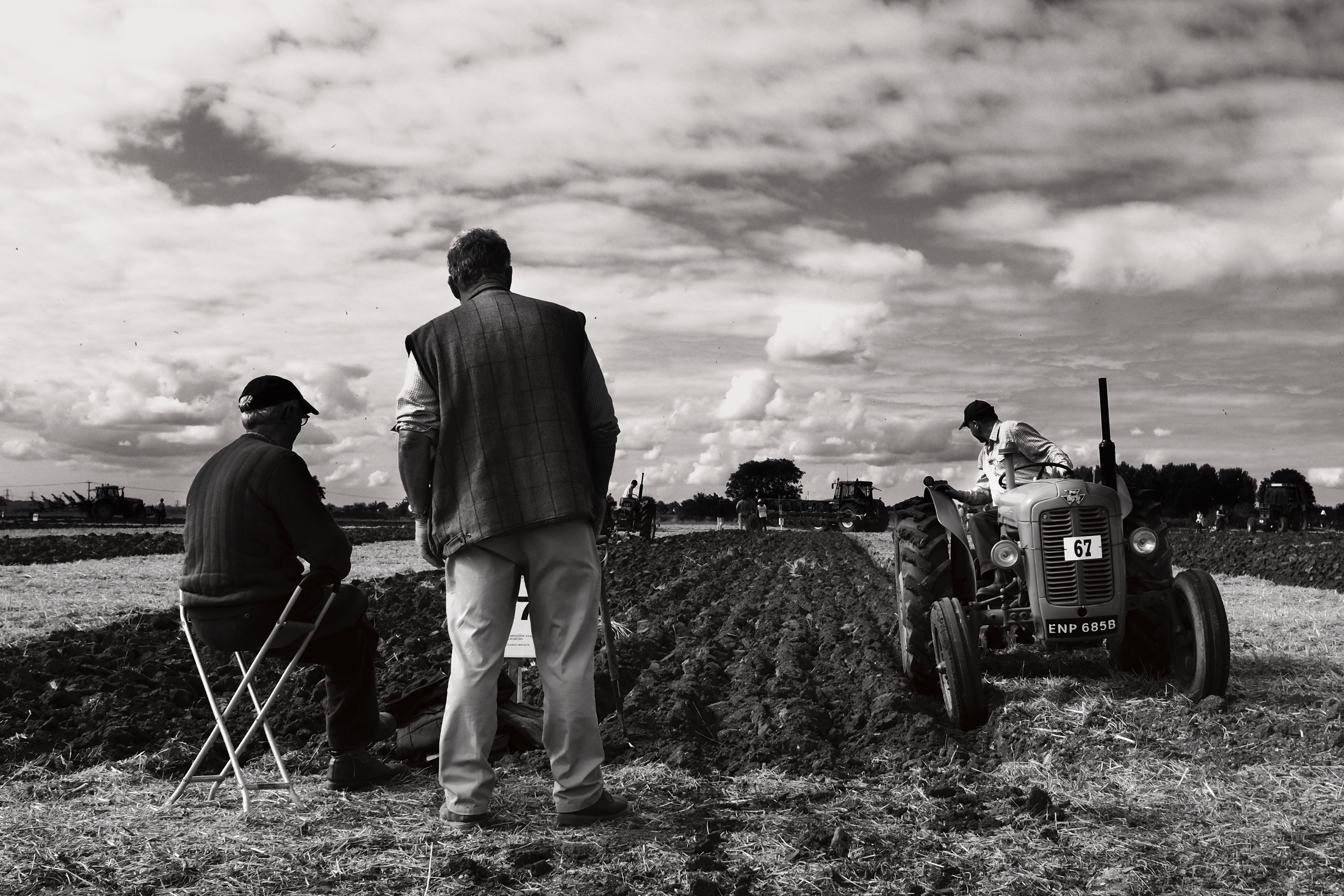
Judging an entry in the Fairford, Faringdon, Filkins and Burford Ploughing Championships, United Kingdom, 2014.

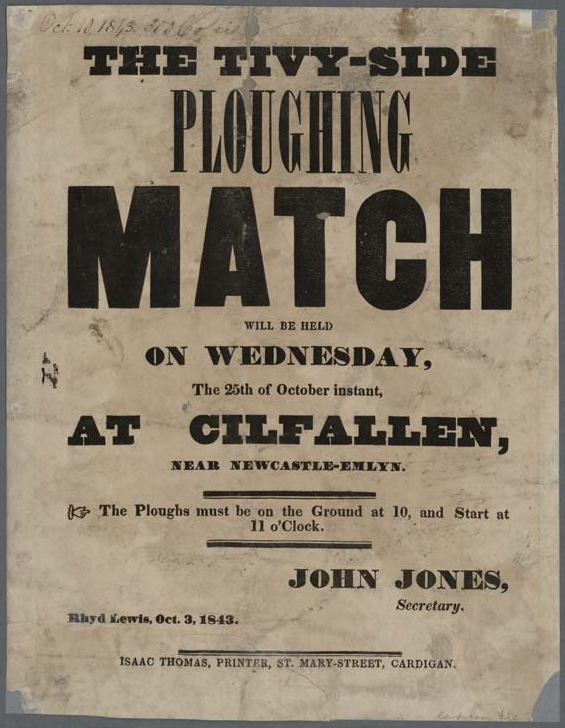
An advertisement for a ploughing match in 1842

A ploughing match is a contest in which participants each plough a section of a field. Nowadays there are usually classes for horse-drawn ploughs and for tractor ploughing. Points are awarded for straightness and neatness of the resulting furrows.

The annual 3-day long Irish National Ploughing Championships has grown into one of the largest outdoor events in the world, with commercial exhibits and a significant national media presence.

In Ontario, the International Plowing Match is an important rural event.
