= R713 road (Ireland) =

Road in Ireland

R713 road
- Bóthar R713
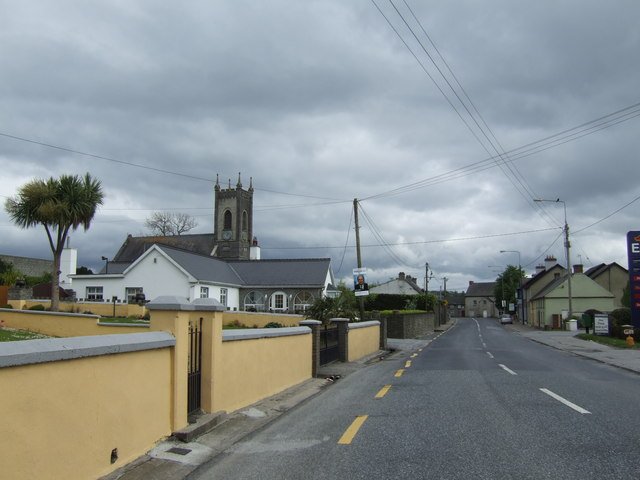
- R713 in Knocktopher (formerly N10)

Route information
- Length: 12.2 km (7.6 mi)

Major junctions
- From: M9 at Danesfort, County Kilkenny
- R699 at Knocktopher

- To: R448 at Kiltorcan

Location
- Country: Ireland

Highway system
- Roads in Ireland; Motorways; Primary; Secondary; Regional
← R712	→ R724

The R713 road is a regional road in County Kilkenny, Ireland. It connects the M9 with the R448, via the villages of Stoneyford and Knocktopher. The road is 12.2 kilometres (7.6 mi) long.

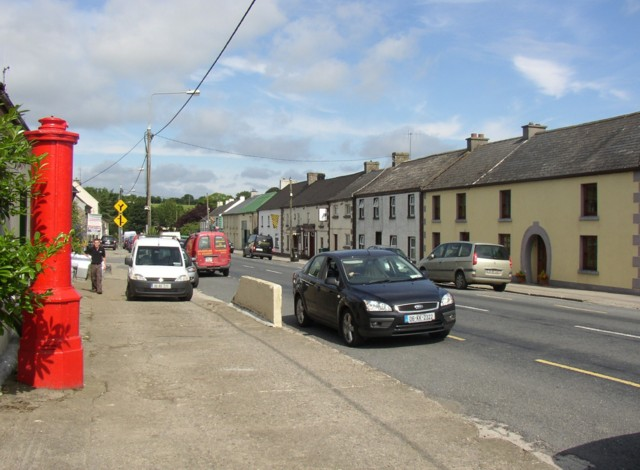
Main Street, Stoneyford on the R713
