= Nicholas Moore (priest) =

New Zealand Catholic priest

Nicholas Moore (16 September 1887 – 19 September 1985) was a notable New Zealand Catholic priest. He was born in Kilmoganny, County Kilkenny, Ireland on 16 September 1887. He was educated for the priesthood at St Kieran's College, Kilkenny, and ordained there.
