= R698 road (Ireland) =

Regional road in Counties Kilkenny and Waterford, Ireland

Coordinates: 52°25′51″N 7°22′18″W

R698 road
- Bóthar R698
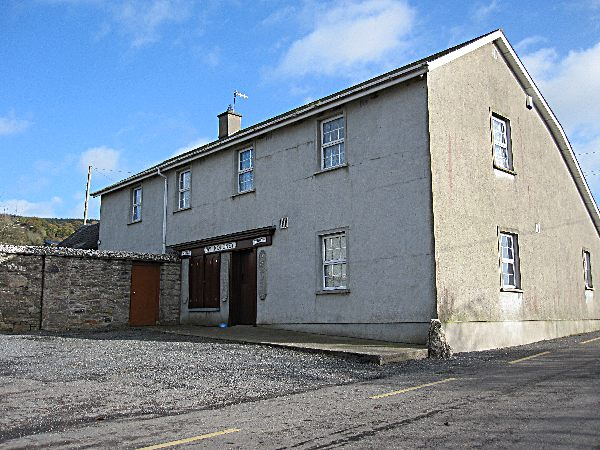
- R698 passing Moloney's pub, Skough

Route information
- Length: 25.6 km (15.9 mi)

Major junctions
- From: N76 at Callan
- R697 at Tullaghought/Skough; N24 at Fiddown

- To: R680 at Mountbolton

Location
- Country: Ireland

Highway system
- Roads in Ireland; Motorways; Primary; Secondary; Regional
← R697	→ R699

The R698 road is a regional road in County Kilkenny and County Waterford, Ireland. It runs from Callan southwards, crossing the River Suir and ending near Portlaw.
