= Sheepstown Church =

- Ballynageragh
- Cill Bhaile na gCaorach
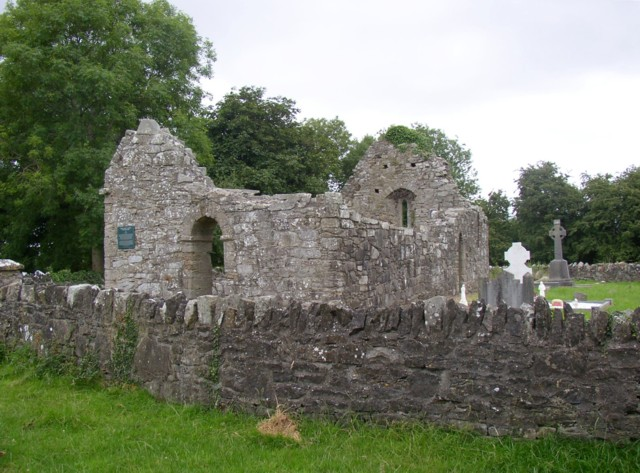

- Location within Ireland
- 52.4849°N 7.243442°W
- Location: Sheepstown, Knocktopher, County Kilkenny
- Country: Ireland
- Denomination: Church of Ireland
- Previous denomination: Pre-Reformation Catholic

History
- Dedication: Saint Muicín

Architecture
- Functional status: inactive
- Heritage designation

National monument of Ireland
- Official name: Sheepstown Church
- Reference no.: 73
- Style: Hiberno-Romanesque
- Years built: 12th–13th centuries

Specifications
- Length: 14 m (46 ft)
- Width: 6 m (20 ft)
- Materials: sandstone

Administration
- Diocese: Ossory

Sheepstown Church is a medieval church and National Monument in County Kilkenny, Ireland.

== Location ==
Sheepstown Church is located 1.8 km (1.1 mi) west of Knocktopher, immediately west of Junction 10 of the M9.

== History ==
The church at Sheepstown is dedicated to St Muicín, bishop and confessor (d. 630). The stone church was built during the 12th or 13th century, at a period when the Irish church was moving from a monastic to a diocesan setup.

== Church ==
The church is Hiberno-Romanesque and simple in design. The west doorway has simple bead moulding, as do the four corners of the gables. The door in the south may have led to the sacristy. High in the northwest corner is a corbel called the "clock-stone", perhaps the gnomon of a sundial.
