= Scoil Aireagail =

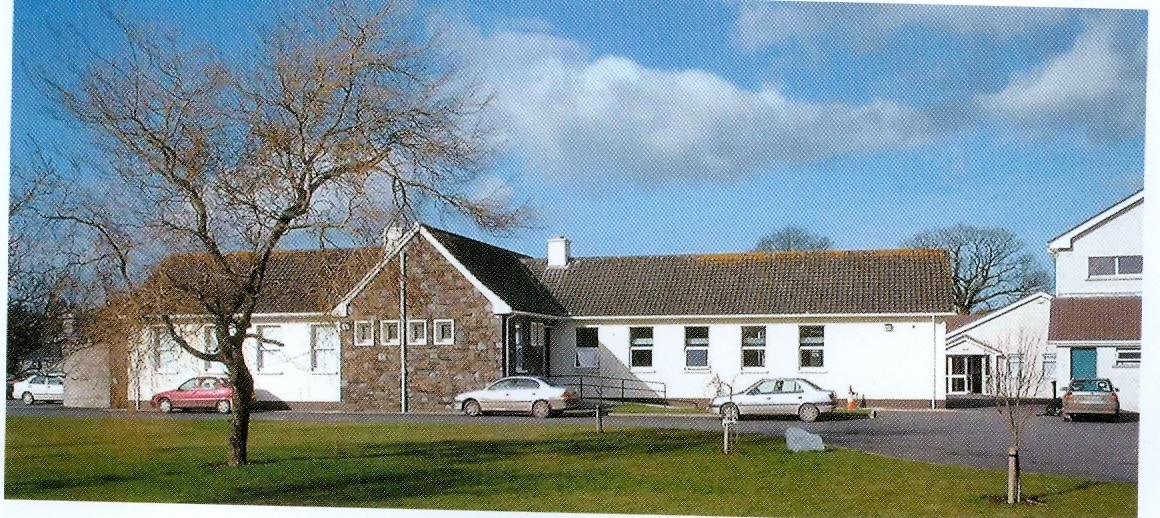

Location
- Ballyhale, County Kilkenny, Ireland
- Coordinates: 52.4789°N 7.213°W

Information
- Former name: Ballyhale Vocational School
- Type: Secondary school
- Established: 1959 (as Ballyhale Vocational School)
- Principal: Helen McTighe
- Gender: Coeducational
- Enrollment: approx. 200 (2026)
- Patronage: Kilkenny and Carlow ETB (Education and Training Board)
- Website: http://scoilaireagail.ie

Scoil Aireagail (formerly Ballyhale Vocational School) is a mixed-gender secondary school in Ballyhale, County Kilkenny, Ireland. It is in the patronage of the Kilkenny and Carlow Education and Training Board.

When it originally opened in 1959, forty students were enrolled and there were just two classrooms. Students were accepted to study for their Group Certificate Examination. Originally known as Ballyhale Vocational School, the school was opened/reopened, as Scoil Aireagail, in October 1999.

As of 2025, the school had approximately 200 students enrolled and it was offering Junior Cycle, Transition Year and Leaving Certificate programmes.
