= R701 road (Ireland) =

Road in Ireland

Coordinates: 52.471452°N 7.263002°W

R701 road
- Bóthar R701
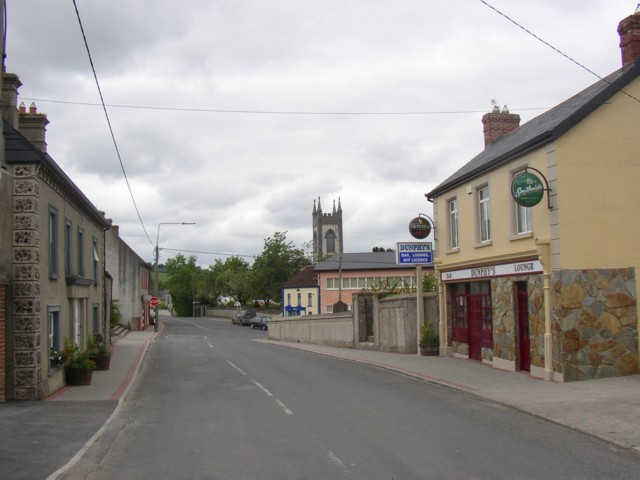
- Kilmoganny, County Kilkenny, on the R701

Route information
- Length: 6.6 km (4.1 mi)

Major junctions
- From: R697 Kilmoganny
- To: R699 Sheepstown

Location
- Country: Ireland

Highway system
- Roads in Ireland; Motorways; Primary; Secondary; Regional

The R701 road is a regional road in Ireland, located in County Kilkenny.
