= R699 road (Ireland) =

Road in Ireland

R699 road
- Bóthar R699
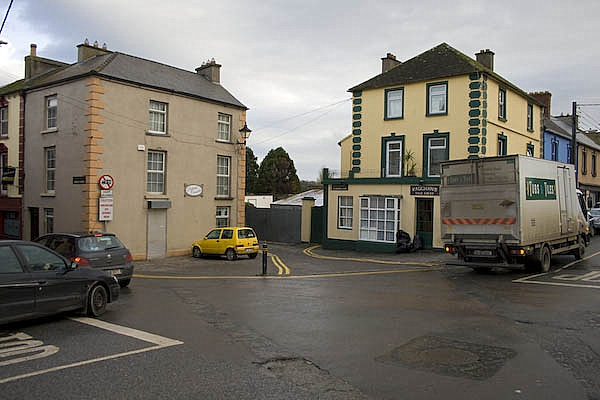
- Mill Street, Callan, on the R699

Route information
- Length: 18.1 km (11.2 mi)

Major junctions
- From: N76 at Callan South, County Kilkenny
- R697 at Dunnamaggan West; M9 at Sheepstown; R713 at Knocktopher

- To: R448 at Moanroe Commons

Location
- Country: Ireland

Highway system
- Roads in Ireland; Motorways; Primary; Secondary; Regional
← R698	→ R700

The R699 road is a regional road in County Kilkenny, Ireland. It connects the N76 with the R448, via the M9. The road travels through the town of Callan and the villages of Dunnamaggin and Knocktopher. The road is 18.1 kilometres (11.2 mi) long.
