= Carrickshock incident =

1831 incident in Tithe War in Ireland

- Part of the Tithe war
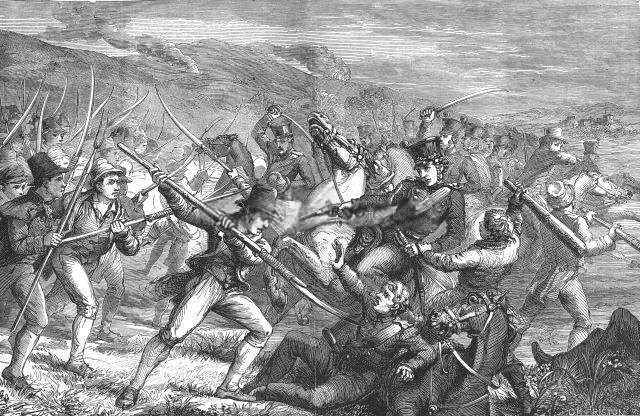
- "The Affray at Carrickshock" (David Henry Friston)
- Date: 14 December 1831
- Location: Carrickshock, near Hugginstown, County Kilkenny; 52.4492°N 7.2394°W

Parties
Irish tenant farmers	Royal Irish Constabulary

Lead figures
Local leaders	James Gibbons

Number
Undetermined	38

Casualties and losses
3 killed, some more wounded	14 killed, 11 wounded

The Carrickshock incident, Carrickshock massacre, or battle of Carrickshock was a confrontation between the Irish Constabulary and local Catholic tenant farmers near Carrickshock, near Hugginstown, County Kilkenny, on 14 December 1831, during the Tithe War in Ireland. Seventeen were killed: fourteen of a party attempting to collect tithes and three of the crowd of locals who confronted them. The incident was unusual among massacres in the Tithe War in that the majority of casualties were supporters rather than opponents of tithes.

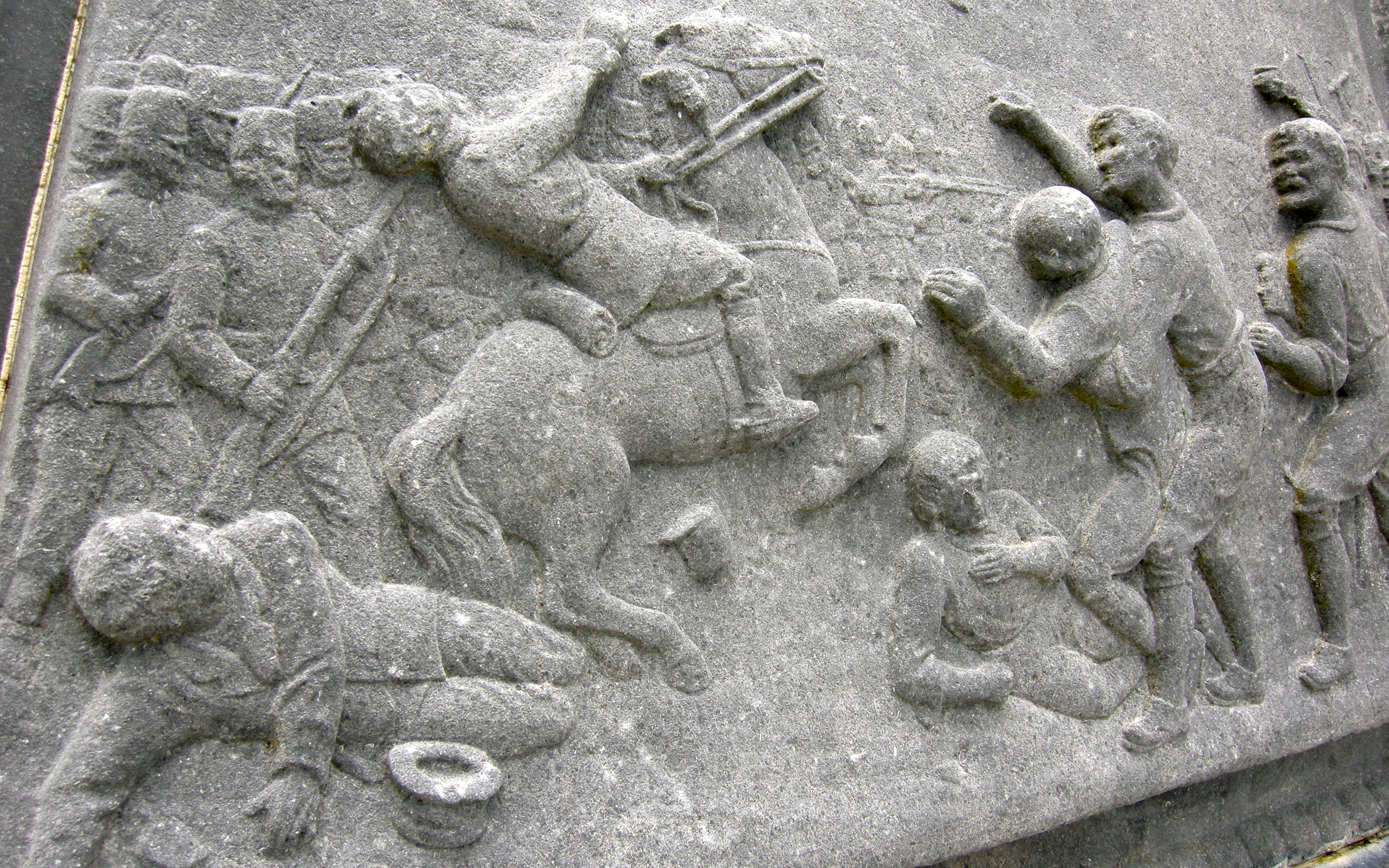
Relief on the base of the memorial cross at the site of the incident

== Background ==
In Ireland from 1830, beginning in Kilkenny, Roman Catholic tenant farmers began withholding the tithes they were obliged to pay to the vicar of the local Church of Ireland parish. Dr. Hans Hamilton was rector of Knocktopher, a union of five parishes: Knocktopher, Aghaviller, Kilmoganny, Dunnamaggin, and Derrynahinch. and in January 1831 he refused the request of a delegation of tenants to reduce their tithe rate. In March, Hamilton began legal proceedings to enforce collection, and in November the Dublin Castle administration issued tithe processes relating to the defaulters. Hamilton's land agent, James Bunbury, employed Edmund Butler, a local butcher, to serve these processes to the tenants. The local resident magistrate, Joseph Green, authorised a Constabulary escort.

On 12 December, Butler set out, protected by 38 constables under the command of a sub-inspector, Captain James Gibbons, a veteran of the Napoleonic Wars. Although the notices were delivered peacefully for two days, a group of locals gathered on the evening of 13 December. Lahert states the locals had been exasperated by insulting behaviour from Butler. A man wearing a sash warned the collectors that trouble would ensue if they returned the following day. This man was later reputed to be William Keane, a hedge schoolmaster and veteran of the 1798 Wexford Rebellion who had arrived in nearby Ballyhale in 1830.

== Affray ==
On 14 December, Butler's party was followed through the morning by bands of locals in paramilitary formation, summoned by blowing of horns and ringing of bells in the local Catholic chapels. (The ropes of the bells were outdoors and might be rung be anyone; Joseph Green was confident that priests had not colluded in the organisation.) About midday they were on the way from Ballyhale to Hugginstown when they were confronted in a boreen (narrow lane) in the townland of Carrickshock Commons, near the hamlet of Carrickshock in the neighbouring townland of Ballygeardra. The lane was flanked by high stone walls, and one or two thousand locals barred the route and surrounded Butler's group, shouting "We'll have Butler or blood!" A youth ran into the party and grabbed Butler, who was pulled back by a constable. The youth was bayonetted by two constables and shot by Gibbons. Butler was struck on the head by a stone hurled from the crowd. Captain Gibbons ordered his men to open fire; they got off 20 rounds but could not reload in the confined space. The crowd began hurling rocks from the walls onto the party. Within five or ten minutes the affray was over; Butler, Gibbons, and 11 constables had been killed or mortally wounded, and 14 constables severely injured, by blows from rocks, mallets and hurleys and stab wounds from pikes and scythes. Three locals were killed and an unknown number injured. Though not named in contemporary sources, since 1907 the names of the three dead have been given as James Treacy (the bayonetted youth) of Kilcurl, Patrick Power of Kilcurl, and Thomas Phelan of Kilkeasy.

== Arrests and trials ==
William Keane was never apprehended and was rumoured to have fled to America. Eleven men were sent to trial for murder at the Kilkenny assizes in 1832.

At the spring assizes in March, John Kennedy was acquitted. He was defended by Daniel O'Connell, who argued that an impartial jury was impossible, and that a ballad praising the Carrickshock 'murderers' was prejudicial. Trial of the remaining suspects was postponed to the summer assizes in July.

A crowd of up to 200,000 from surrounding counties gathered at an anti-tithe meeting at Ballyhale in July 1832, in part to intimidate jurors at the murder trial. John Ryan was discharged after two trials with hung jury, and William Voss was acquitted. Charges were dropped for the remaining suspects: Thomas Ryan, Patrick Carty, John Daly, Richard Grennan, Patrick Dwyer, Edmond Duggan, William Walsh, and Thomas Egan.

== Aftermath ==
Hamilton left his parish the night after the riot and emigrated to England, where he died eight years later. The Church of Ireland bishops decided to suspend collection of tithes pending discussion by Parliament of the security situation. Collection resumed in April 1833, but the Tithe War lasted till 1838.

Of the 38 constables, 24 were Protestants, of whom 9 were killed and 11 wounded, while of the 14 Catholics only 2 were killed and 4 wounded. Colonel Sir John Harvey stated that, though he felt this discrepancy was accidental and not sectarian in cause, it had created tension between Catholic and Protestant members of the Constabulary.

== Remembrance ==
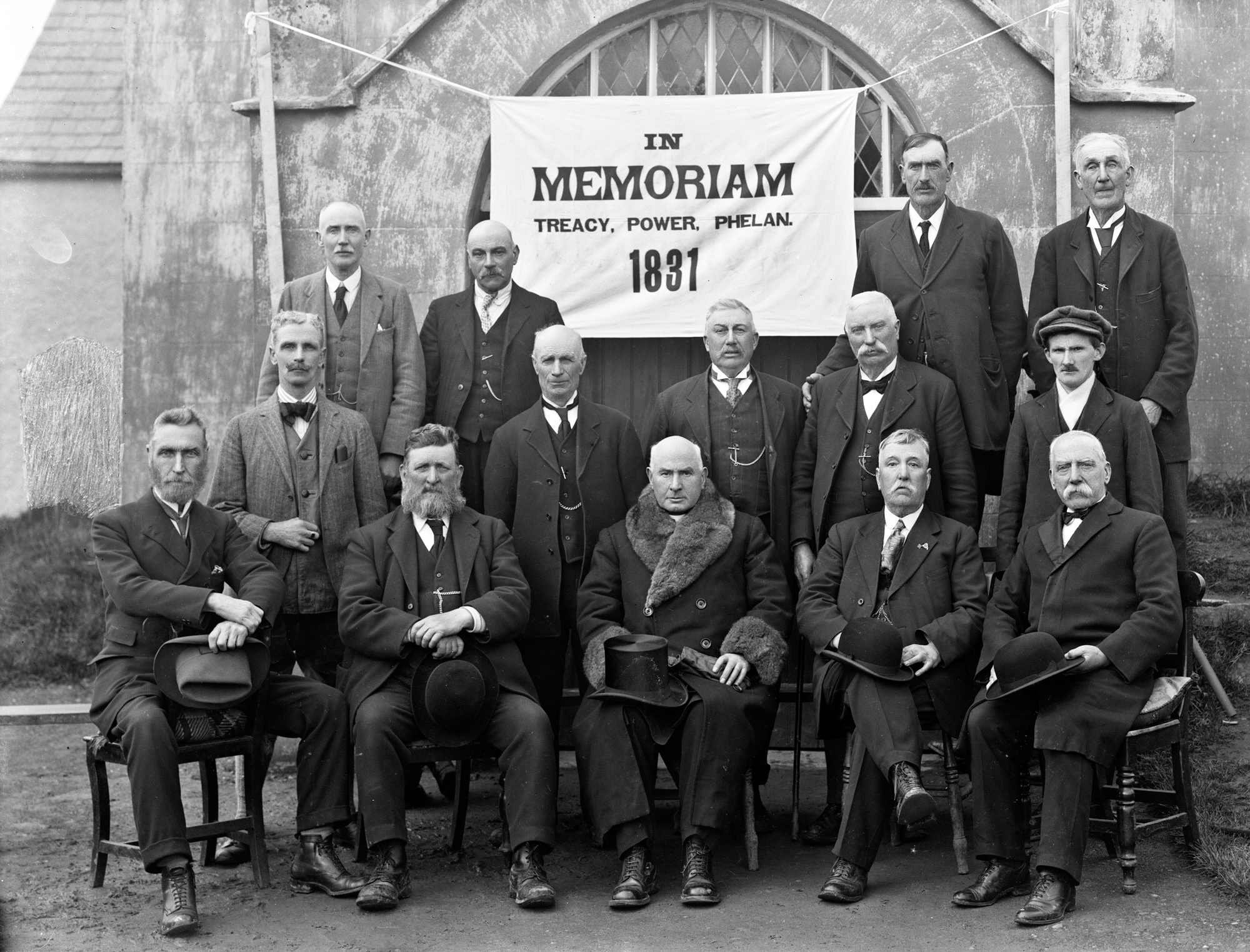
The 1925 committee involved in the construction of a memorial to the Carrickshock incident

"Carrickshock!" was a slogan used in subsequent decades by nationalist crowds confronting the Constabulary (from 1867 the Royal Irish Constabulary or RIC) and other agents of the state. Gary Owens notes six commemorative poems and ballads, four in English and two in Irish, published in the following years. The Irish Folklore Commission collected numerous legends relating to the incident. The incident features in the novels The Tithe Proctor (1849) by William Carleton and Ulick Grace, or, A Tale of the Tithes (1880) by John Locke.

The incident has remained important in the local nationalist historical narrative. On 8 March 1920, during the Irish War of Independence, an Irish Republican Army assault on the RIC barracks at Hugginstown began with a muster at the Carrickshock site, chosen not for tactical but for symbolic value. In July 1925, a celtic cross memorial to the three locals killed was erected at the site of the incident. In 1928, the GAA clubs of Hugginstown and Knockmoylan merged to a new club with the name Carrickshock.
