= Screggan, Offaly =

Townsland in Offaly, Ireland

Coordinates: 53°15′09″N 7°33′34″W

Screggan (Irish: An Screagán), is an area which coves the villages of Mucklagh and Rahan in County Offaly, Ireland.
