= Stoneyford, County Kilkenny =

Village in Ireland

Stoneyford Áth Stúin (Irish)
- Town
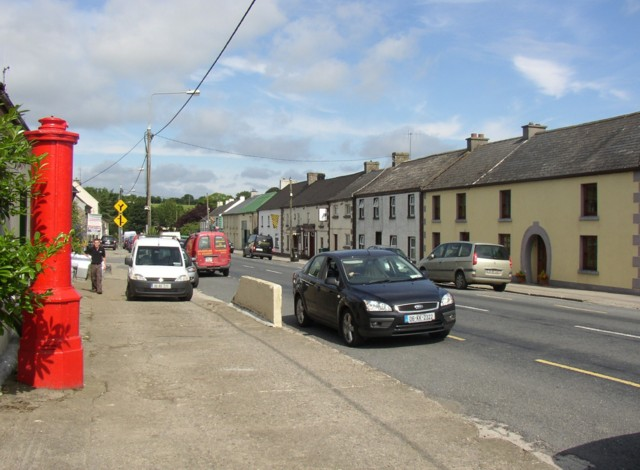
- Main Street

- Location in Ireland
- Coordinates: 52°31′53″N 7°13′39″W
- Country: Ireland
- Province: Leinster
- County: County Kilkenny

Population (2016)
  - Total: 376
- (recorded as "Lawcus-Stoneyford")
- Time zone: UTC+0 (WET)
  - Summer (DST): UTC-1 (IST (WEST))
- Website: www.stoneyford.ie

Stoneyford, officially Stonyford (Irish: Áth Stúin) is a small town in County Kilkenny, Ireland. It lies on the R713 road some 14 km south of Kilkenny City. Stoneyford is a part of the parish of Aghaviller in the Diocese of Ossory.

Two small streams run through the village, one to the west and the second to the north of the village. Both streams join the north of the village and continue northwards as a tributary to the King's River, which is less than 500 metres north of the village. It merges with the River Nore to the east of Stoneyford. The King's River contains salmon and is used regularly for fishing.

== Architectural heritage ==
Stoneyford has a number of buildings which are listed on the Record of Protected Structures for County Kilkenny. These include the early 19th century Catholic Church, the old two-storey school house and the pub-front of "O'Grady's" premises with its marbleised lettering.

== Archaeology ==
In the mid-19th century it came to light that a Roman burial had reportedly been discovered near Stoneyford. This discovery consisted of three articles: a green glass urn containing bones 10 inches in height, a glass lachrymatory, and a bronze mirror silvered or tinned on the convex side. The burial has been described as typical of the Roman middle-class burial rite of the first two centuries A.D. The burial is generally thought to have been that of a Roman trader, and has been cited as evidence pointing towards the presence of a "strong and secure Roman community" nearby, though no such settlement has been discovered as of yet.

== Population ==
The 2016 census recorded Stoneyford with a population of 376 persons, up from 355 in 2011. There are two new housing estates in the area; Chapel View, which is in the middle of the village, and Lawcus Fields on the road to Kells.

== Amenities ==
Stoneyford's amenities include a food store, public house, a take away restaurant, and a café. The Garda station is closed, and there is no resident Garda, with the Stoneyford covered by Thomastown Garda station.

Stoneyford is served by one primary school, Scoil Chiaráin Naofa, which opened in 1948. The school has four classrooms, a yard to the front and rear, and a grassed area to the side. In 2014, a small grass playing field was developed to the rear of the school.

Stoneyford also has a community center building which hosts a number of classes and activities. The Church of Ireland faith is served by St. Peter's Church, Ennisnag, Kilkenny, just outside Stoneyford.

== Sport ==
Carrickshock Gaelic Athletic Association is the local hurling club. They have been County Kilkenny senior hurling champions seven times: in 1931, 1938, 1940, 1941, 1942, 1943, and 1951.

A number of underage sports exist within the village. Stoneyford Football Club has teams covering the U4-U14 age groups. They also have a men's team.

There is an underage athletics club which is run once a week next to the community centre.

== See also ==
- List of towns and villages in Ireland
