= Ballyboodan Ogham Stone =

- Cloch Oghaim Bhaile Mhuadáin (Irish)
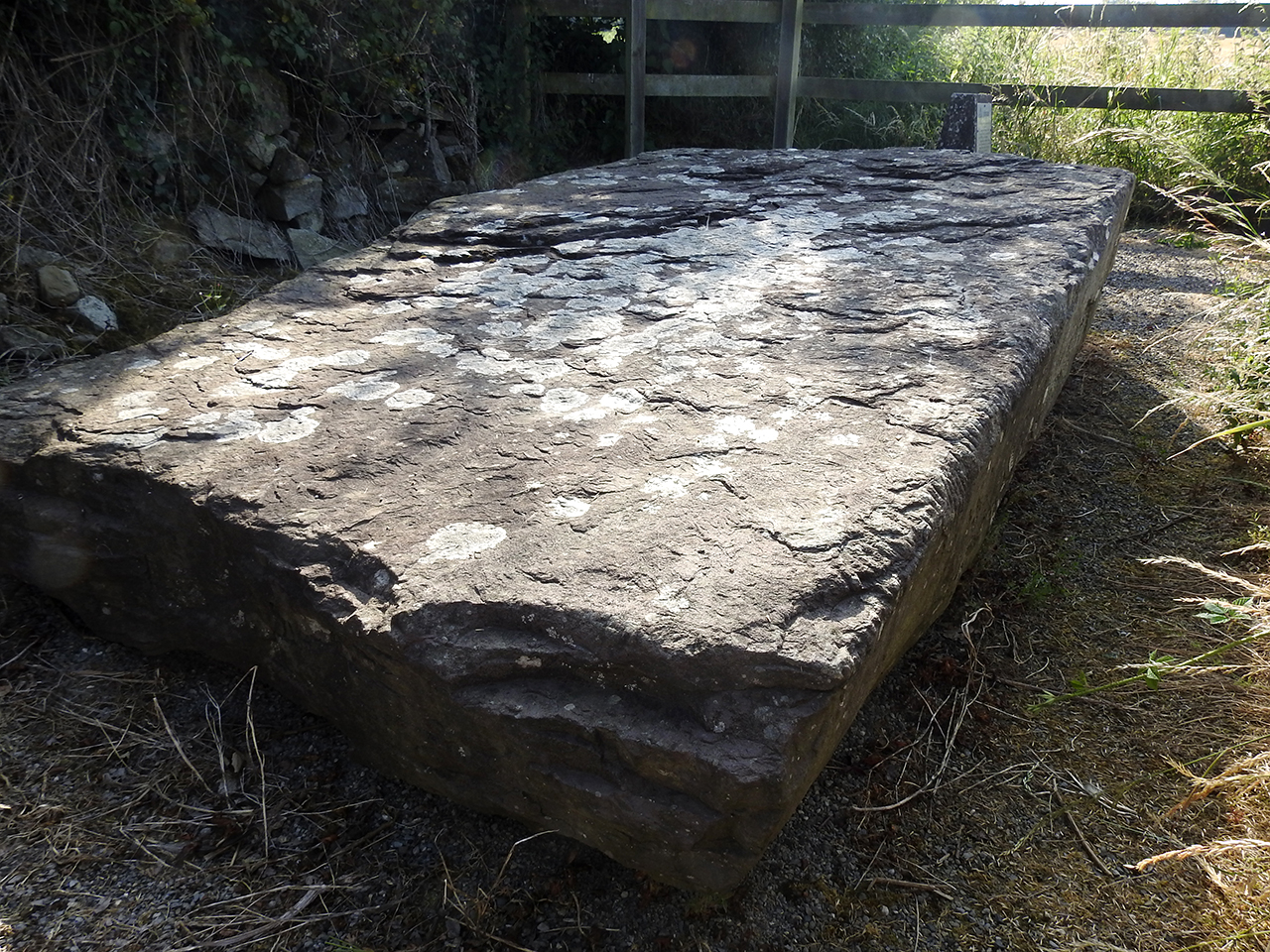

- Location within Ireland
- 52.470111°N 7.222667°W
- Type: Ogham stone
- Location: Ballyboodan, Knocktopher, County Kilkenny, Ireland

History
- Built: AD 700–900

Site notes
- Elevation: 60 m (200 ft)
- Height: 2.31 m (7 ft 7 in)
- Area: Nore Valley

National monument of Ireland
- Official name: Ballyboodan
- Reference no.: 599

Ballyboodan Ogham Stone (CIIC 038) is an ogham stone and National Monument located in County Kilkenny, Ireland.

== Location ==
Ballyboodan Ogham Stone lies in an enclosure on the roadside, 1.7 km (1.1 mi) south of Knocktopher.

== History ==
Ballyboodan Ogham Stone was carved c. AD 700–900. It was rediscovered before 1841, and was knocked down by treasure-seekers. In 1850 the tenant of the land wanted to destroy it as an obstacle to the plough, but it was saved by the landlord, Sir Hercules Richard Langrishe, 3rd Baronet.

== Description ==
Ballyboodan Ogham Stone is a block of slate measuring 231 × 175 × 23 cm and has Ogham carvings incised on one edge. ᚛ᚉᚑᚏᚁᚔᚕᚑᚔᚋᚐᚊᚔᚂᚐᚏᚔᚇ᚜ (CORBI KOI MAQI LABRID, "Here is Corb, son of Labraid").
