= Hugginstown =

Village in County Kilkenny, Ireland

Hugginstown Baile hUgúin
- Village
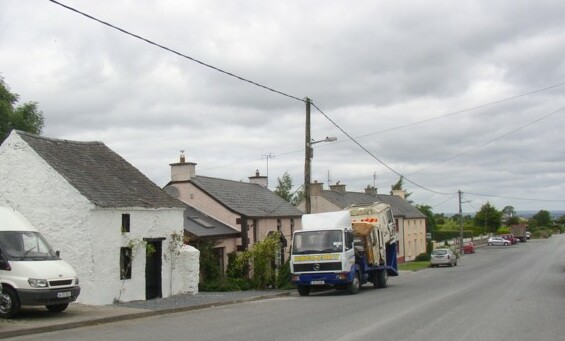
- Buildings in Hugginstown

- Location in Ireland
- Coordinates: 52°27′N 7°15′W
- Country: Ireland
- Province: Leinster
- County: County Kilkenny
- Time zone: UTC+0 (WET)
  - Summer (DST): UTC-1 (IST (WEST))

Hugginstown (Irish: Baile hUgúin, historically anglicised as 'Ballyhuggin') is a small village and townland in south County Kilkenny, Ireland. The local Gaelic Athletic Association club, Carrickshock GAA, play their home games in the village.

== Location ==
Hugginstown is located in the south of County Kilkenny, between Kilkenny and Waterford cities. The townland of Hugginstown lies in the civil parish of Aghaviller. Hugginstown Fen, a nearby wetland fen also known as Garú Bog, is a designated Special Area of Conservation.

== History ==
Evidence of ancient settlement in the area includes a number of ring fort, fulacht fiadh and enclosure sites in the townlands of Hugginstown and Carrickmerlin. Within the village is a burial ground and the ruin of a former Catholic church, dating to c. 1800. The modern church, the Church of the Most Holy Trinity, is nearby.

In 1831, during the Tithe War, 17 people were killed near Hugginstown in an incident sometimes known as the Battle of Carrickshock. In March 1920, during the Irish War of Independence, the Hugginstown Company of the Irish Republican Army captured the local Royal Irish Constabulary barracks. An RIC officer, Thomas Ryan, was fatally wounded during the attack.

== See also ==
- List of towns and villages in Ireland
