= R697 road (Ireland) =

Road in Ireland

R697 road
- Bóthar R697
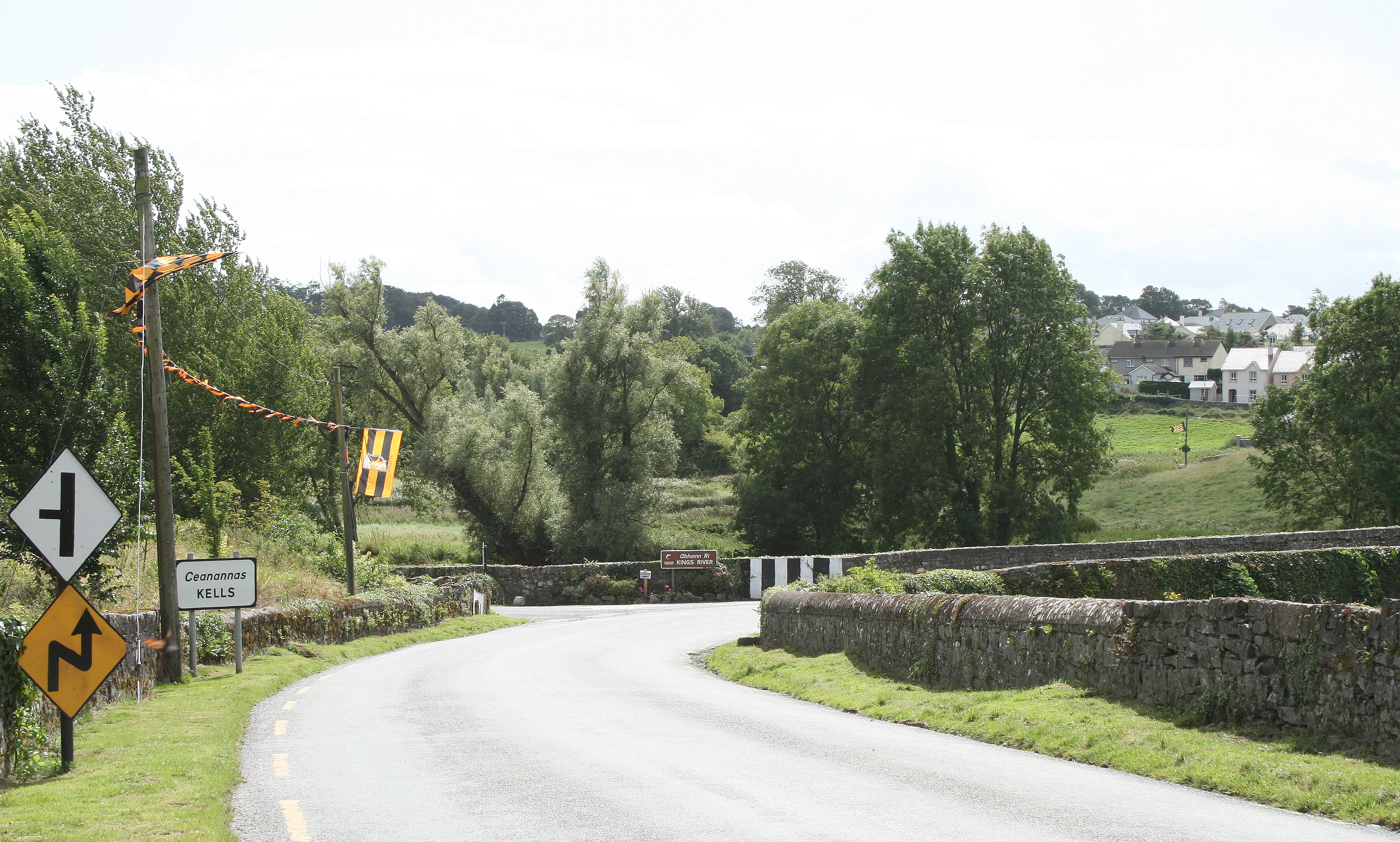
- The R697 approaching Kells and the Kings River

Route information
- Length: 42 km (26 mi)

Location
- Country: Ireland
- Primary destinations: County Kilkenny; Kilkenny starts in the city centre and leaves the N77 ring road; Crosses the Kings River; Kells; (R699); Kilmaganny - (R701); Joins the R698 for 4km, then leaves; County Tipperary; Carrick-on-Suir terminates at the N24

Highway system
- Roads in Ireland; Motorways; Primary; Secondary; Regional

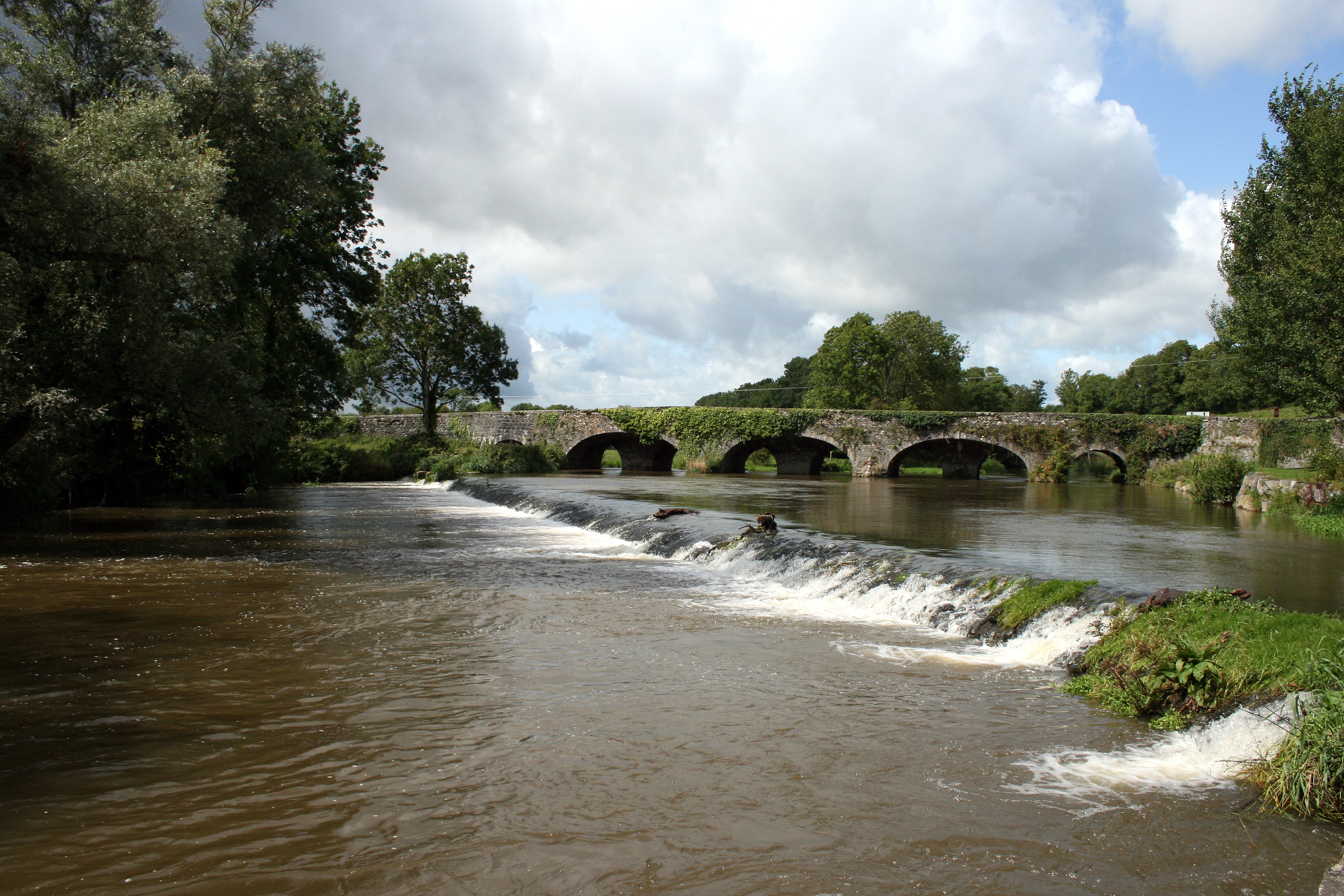
The R697 bridge over the Kings River at Kells

The R697 road is a regional road in Ireland which runs north-south from the centre of Kilkenny in County Kilkenny to the N24 national primary road in Carrick-on-Suir in County Tipperary. The route is 42 km (26 mi) long.

== See also ==
- Roads in Ireland
- National primary road
