= Tithe War =

Irish campaign against forced church taxation

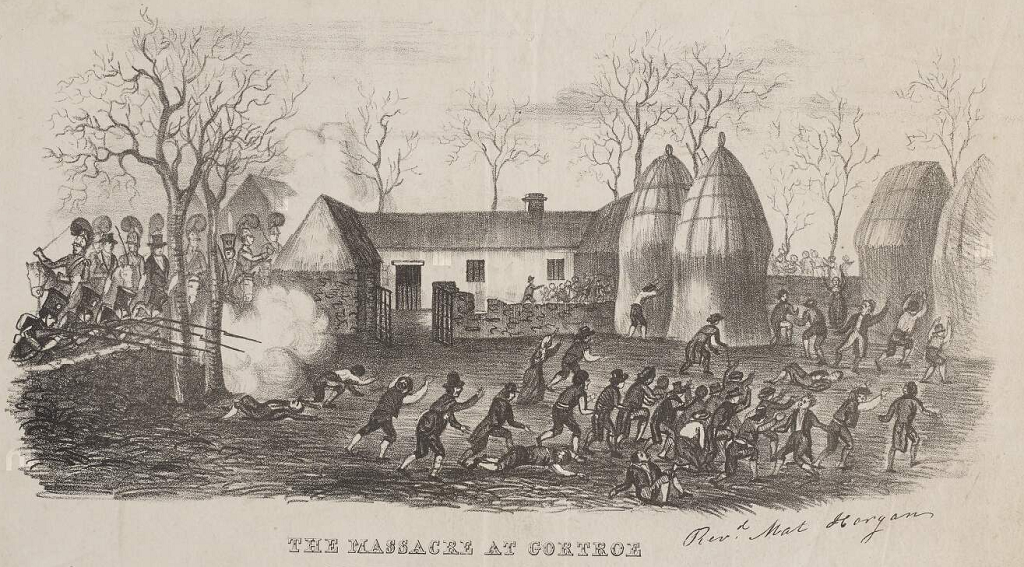
- Rathcormac-Gortroe massacre December 1834
Date	1831-38
Location	Ireland
Result	Tithe Rentcharge (Ireland) Act 1838

Belligerents
Tithe Defaulters	(United Kingdom) Britain

The Tithe War (Irish: Cogadh na nDeachúna) was a campaign of mainly nonviolent civil disobedience, punctuated by sporadic violent episodes, in Ireland between 1830 and 1836 in reaction to the enforcement of tithes on the Roman Catholic majority for the upkeep of the established state church, the Church of Ireland. Tithes were payable in cash or kind and payment was compulsory, irrespective of an individual's religious adherence.

== Background ==
Tithe payment was an obligation on those working the land to pay ten per cent of the value of certain types of agricultural produce for the upkeep of the clergy and maintenance of the assets of the church. After the Reformation in Ireland of the 16th century, the assets of the church were allocated by King Henry VIII to the new established church. The majority of the population in Ireland who continued to adhere to Catholicism were then obliged to make tithe payments which were directed away from their own church to the reformed one. This increased the financial burden on subsistence farmers, many of whom were at the same time making voluntary contributions to the construction or purchase of new premises to provide Roman Catholic places of worship.

Emancipation for Roman Catholics was promised by Pitt during the campaign in favour of the Act of Union of 1801 which was approved by the Irish Parliament, thus abolishing itself and creating the United Kingdom of Great Britain and Ireland. However, King George III refused to keep Pitt's promises. It was not until 1829 that the Duke of Wellington's government promoted and parliament enacted the Roman Catholic Emancipation Act, in the teeth of defiant royal opposition from King George IV.

But the obligation to pay tithes to the Church of Ireland remained, causing much resentment. Roman Catholic clerical establishments in Ireland had refused government offers of tithe-sharing with the established church, fearing that British government regulation and control would come with acceptance of such money.

The tithe burden lay directly on the shoulders of farmers, whether tenants or owner-occupiers. More often than not, tithes were paid in kind, in the form of produce or livestock. In 1830, given the system of benefices in the Anglican system, almost half of the clergy were not resident in the parishes from which they drew their incomes. These issues, more often than not, were inflamed by the senior Irish Roman Catholic clergy, who were now dependent on voluntary contributions due to the discontinuation of the Maynooth grant. Incensed farmers vehemently resisted paying for the support of two clerical establishments. With the involvement of many of the Roman Catholic bishops and clergy, they began a campaign of non-payment.

After Emancipation in 1829, an organized campaign of resistance to collection began. It was sufficiently successful to have a serious financial effect on the welfare of established church clergy. In 1831, the government compiled lists of defaulters and issued collection orders for the seizure of goods and chattels (mostly stock). Spasmodic violence broke out in various parts of Ireland, particularly in counties Kilkenny, Tipperary and Wexford. The Irish Constabulary, which had been established in 1822, attempted to enforce the orders of seizures. At markets and fairs, the constabulary often seized stock and produce, which often resulted in violent resistance.

== Unrest ==
A campaign of passive resistance was proposed by Patrick "Patt" Lalor (1781–1856), a farmer of Tenakill, Queen's County, who later served as a repeal MP (1832–35). He declared at a public meeting in February 1831 in Maryborough that "...he would never again pay tithes; that he would violate no law; that the tithe men might take his property, and offer it for sale; but his countrymen, he was proud to say, respected him, and he thought that none of them would buy or bid for it if exposed for sale. The declaration was received by the meeting in various ways: by many with surprise and astonishment; by others with consternation and dismay, but by a vast majority with tremendous cheering." Lalor held true to his word and did not resist the confiscation of 20 sheep from his farm, but was able to ensure no buyers appeared at subsequent auctions.

However, from January 1831 it became apparent that resistance to tithe collection would not be solely by peaceful means. Reports arrived in Dublin Castle from all over the country outlining incidents of unrest and violence including the assassination of a Magistrate in Corofin, County Clare. As these activities were considered a continuation of the Rockite movement rather than beginning of a mass protest movement, the initial official response was to deploy military and yeomanry in an attempt to suppress agitation

== The "war" 1831–36 ==
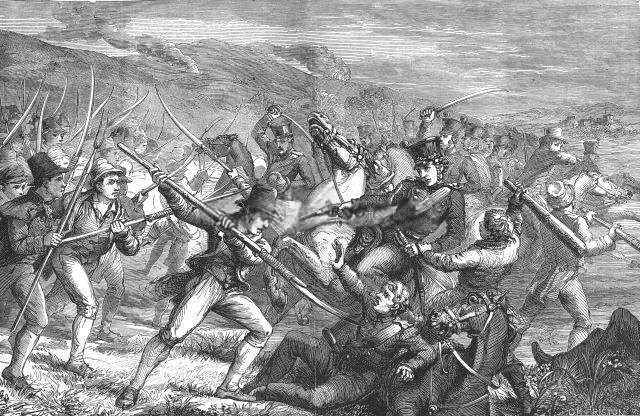
"The Affray at Carrickshock" (David Henry Friston)

The first clash of the Tithe War took place on 3 March 1831 in Graiguenamanagh, County Kilkenny, when a force of 120 yeomanry tried to enforce seizure orders on cattle belonging to a Roman Catholic priest. Encouraged by his bishop, he had organised people to resist tithe collection by placing their stock under his ownership prior to sale. The revolt soon spread. On 18 June 1831, in Bunclody (Newtownbarry), County Wexford, people resisting the seizure of cattle were fired upon by the Irish Constabulary, who killed twelve and wounded twenty; one yeoman was shot dead in retaliation. This massacre caused objectors to organise and use warnings such as church bells to signal the community to round up the cattle and stock. On 14 December 1831, resisters used such warnings to ambush a detachment of 40 Constabulary at Carrickshock (County Kilkenny). Twelve constables, including the Chief Constable, were killed and more wounded. (Other sources put the number of dead at eighteen.)

What makes the Battle of Carrickshock stand out in 'social memory' is examined in the 2004 publication "The Carrickshock Incident, 1831: Social Memory and an Irish cause célèbre" by Gary Owens of Huron University College, in Canada. What makes Carrickshock different in impact could have much to do with what happened nearby in Ballyhale the following year, in 1832, when a gathering of c.200,000 people assembled at Ballyhale from across four counties to support those charged in the aftermath of The Battle of Carrickshock, an extraordinary number for those days before cars. They were also addressed by barrister Daniel O'Connell, also known as Liberator of the Nation. That is deemed to have had a significant influence on its overall outcome for the anti-tithe movement, ensuring that the event marked the beginning of the end of tithes in Ireland. This Ballyhale event is notable too in that it was the first so-called 'monster meeting' of that time. Such peaceful gatherings were to become the hallmark of the Young Ireland and Repeal Movement that was founded in 1839 and which gatherings peaked with Daniel O'Connell's oration at Tara, 1843, where c.750,000 assembled. Michael Davitt's Museum records show that the Land League campaigns, which he co-founded in 1879, followed that path too to ensure that it enabled tenant farmers to be able to own the land on which they worked.

Regular clashes causing fatalities continued over the next two years, causing the authorities to reinforce selected army barracks fearing an escalation. Taking stock of the continuing resistance, in 1831 the authorities recorded 242 homicides, 1,179 robberies, 401 burglaries, 568 burnings, 280 cases of cattle-maiming, 161 assaults, 203 riots and 723 attacks on property directly attributed to seizure order enforcement. In 1832, the president of Carlow College was imprisoned for not paying tithes. The Church Temporalities Act 1833 (3 & 4 Will. 4. c. 37) reduced the size of the Church of Ireland hierarchy and abolished the church rate (called "parish cess" in Ireland), a separate tax from tithes which was similarly resented.

On 18 December 1834, a distraining party backed up by an escort consisting of detachments of the 29th Regiment of Foot, 4th Royal Irish Dragoon Guards and Royal Irish Constabulary was attacked by a crowd of 250 tenant farmers near Bartlemy who were resisting the party's attempt to collect forty shillings in unpaid tithes from a local widower. The escort fired into the crowd, killing between twelve and twenty and wounding forty-five people. O'Connell subsequently denounced the actions of the escort party.

The conflict had the support of the Roman Catholic clergy and the following quotation, from a letter written by the Bishop of Kildare and Leighlin, Dr. James Doyle to Thomas Spring Rice became the rallying cry for the movement:

There are many noble traits in the Irish character, mixed with failings which have always raised obstacles to their own well-being; but an innate love of justice, and an indomitable hatred of oppression, is like a gem upon the front of our nation which no darkness can obscure. To this fine quality I trace their hatred of tithes; may it be as lasting as their love of justice!

== Outcome ==
Finding and collecting livestock chattels and the associated mayhem created public outrage and proved an increasing strain on police relations. The government suspended collections. One official lamented that "it cost a shilling to collect tuppence".

Tithe Rentcharge (Ireland) Act 1838 (Note: The citation of this act by this short title was authorised by section 1 of, and the first schedule to, the Short Titles Act 1896. Due to the repeal of those provisions it is now authorised by section 19(2) of the Interpretation Act 1978.)
- Act of Parliament
- Parliament of the United Kingdom
- Long title: An Act to abolish Compositions for Tithes in Ireland, and to substitute Rent-charges in lieu thereof.
- Citation: 1 & 2 Vict. c. 109
- Territorial extent: United Kingdom

Dates
- Royal assent: 15 August 1838
- Commencement: 15 August 1838 (Note: The Acts of Parliament (Commencement) Act 1793.)

Status: Current legislation

Text of statute as originally enacted

King William IV, the last king from the House of Hanover, died in 1837. In 1838, Parliament introduced the Tithe Rentcharge (Ireland) Act 1838 (1 & 2 Vict. c. 109) for Ireland. This reduced the amount payable directly by about a quarter and made the remainder payable in rent to landlords. They in turn were to pass payment to the authorities. Tithes were thus effectively added to a tenant's rent payment. This partial relief and elimination of the confrontational collections ended the violent aspect of the Tithe War.

Full relief from the tax was not achieved until the Irish Church Act 1869, which disestablished the Church of Ireland, by the Gladstone government.

== See also ==
- Carrickshock incident
- Tax resistance
- Jizya and dhimmi
