= Kilmoganny =

Kilmoganny Irish: Cill Mogeanna
- Village
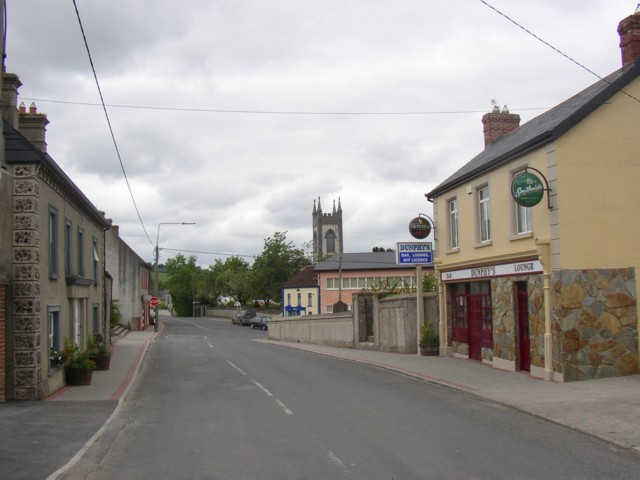
- Pub and church in Kilmoganny

- Location in Ireland
- Coordinates: 52°27′47″N 7°19′43″W
- Country: Ireland
- Province: Leinster
- County: County Kilkenny

Population (2016)
  - Total: 245
- Time zone: UTC+0 (WET)
  - Summer (DST): UTC-1 (IST (WEST))
- Irish Grid Reference: S4560834636

Kilmoganny (officially Kilmaganny; Irish: Cill Mogeanna, meaning 'Church of Saint Mogeanna') is a small village in the County Kilkenny in the south-east of Ireland. Saint Mogeanna was an Irish virgin whose feast day in the Irish Calendar of Saints is 29 January.

It is home to a primary school, post office, a pub, 2 churches, a GAA field and a local shop called Morans or locally known as Pete's. The village is at the junction of the R697 and R701 roads.

Kilmoganny is in the Diocese of Ossory, in the civil parish of Kilmaganny. St. Eoghan's Catholic church is in the parish of Dunnamaggin. St. Matthew's Church of Ireland church is in Kells parish.

As of the 2016 census, Kilmoganny had a population of 245.

== Notable people ==
- Nicholas Moore (1887–1985), priest
- Brendan Fennelly (1956–2019), hurler
- John Lavery (1856–1941), Irish painter, spent the last two years of his life at his step daughter Alice McEnery's home Rossenarra House.
