= 2000 Cork Intermediate Hurling Championship =

Irish hurling competition

- Dates: 6 May 2000 – 22 October 2000
- Teams: 26
- Sponsor: TSB Bank
- Champions: Douglas (1st title)
- Runners-up: Aghada

Tournament statistics
- Matches played: 40
- Goals scored: 138 (3.45 per match)
- Points scored: 885 (22.13 per match)
- Top scorer(s): Richie Lewis (3-41)

The 2000 Cork Intermediate Hurling Championship was the 91st staging of the Cork Intermediate Hurling Championship since its establishment by the Cork County Board in 1909. The draw for the opening round fixtures took place on 12 December 1999. The championship began on 6 May 2000 and ended on 22 October 2000.

On 22 October 2000, Douglas won the championship after a 3-08 to 2-04 defeat of Aghada in the final at Páirc Uí Chaoimh. It remains their only championship title in the grade.

Aghada's Richie Lewis was the championship's top scorer with 3-41.

== Team changes ==
=== From Championship ===
Promoted to the Cork Senior Hurling Championship

- Ballincollig

=== To Championship ===
Promoted from the Cork Junior A Hurling Championship

- Bandon

== Results ==
=== First round ===
6 May 2000 First round	St. Finbarr's	2-09 - 1-11	Bandon	Riverstick
	A Furey 1-2, N Horgan 1-1, K McTiernan 0-2, F Lehane 0-1, E Griffin 0-1, J McCarthy 0-1, N Hosford 0-1.		J Nyhan 0-5, K Hurley 1-1, D Burke 0-2, D O'Donoghue 0-2, N O'Rourke 0-1.

6 May 2000 First round	Kilbrittain	1-18 - 0-12	Inniscarra	Cloughduv
	D O'Connell 1-10 O Sexton 0-2, F O'Mahony 0-2, E Sheehy 0-2, D Long 0-1, D McSweeney 0-1.		S Holland 0-4, D O'Leary 0-3, J Olden 0-2, J O'Mahony 0-2, T Aherne 0-1.

7 May 2000 First round	Bride Rovers	2-15 - 1-12	Newcestown	Páirc Uí Rinn
	J O'Driscoll 0-8, T Broderick 0-4, P Murphy 1-0, B Murphy 1-0, D Ryan 0-1, J Murphy 0-1, R Cahill 0-1.		P Kenneally 1-7, O O'Donovan 0-3, D Collins 0-1, A Geasley 0-1.

7 May 2000 First round	Blarney	3-14 - 0-15	Youghal	Caherlag
	A Shanahan 1-3, R McNamara 1-1, J Hurley 0-4, T Harrington 1-0, D McCarthy 0-2, D McSweeney 0-2, S O'Donoghue 0-1, E McCarthy 0-1.		O Coleman 0-6, B Coleman 0-2, P Coyne 0-1, D Coyne 0-1, D Ring 0-1, A Foley 0-1, O O'Brien 0-1, A Geary 0-1, K Coleman 0-1.

7 May 2000 First round	Carrigtwohill	5-09 - 2-13	Aghabullogue	Mayfield
	N Kidney 2-0, M Fitzgerald 1-3, S O'Farrell 1-2, J O'Connor 1-0, N McCarthy 0-3, D Healy 0-1.		J Healy 0-7, D Twomey 1-2, D O'Leary 0-4, T Tarrant 1-0.

12 May 2000 First round	Douglas	3-09 - 2-06	Tracton	Carrigaline
	E Sharkey 1-1, T Twomey 1-0, W Coveney 1-0, B Boyle 0-2, C Horgan 0-1, G Wade 0-1, G McLoughlin 0-1, P Barry 0-1, D Twohig 0-1, R O'Hara 0-1.		P Kingston 1-0, M Kingston 1-0, H Sisk 0-2, F Walsh 0-2, F Lynch 0-1, R Cronin 0-1.

13 May 2000 First round	Cloughduv	3-06 - 6-13	Mallow	Banteer
	K Murray 1-4, L Drummy 1-0, J O'Leary 1-0, T Barry-Murphy 0-1, D Corkery 0-1.		P Dineen 3-1, R O'Connell 1-6, J Hayes 1-1, T O'Riordan 1-0, R Galvin 0-3, B Carey 0-1, S Buckley 0-1.

13 May 2000 First round	Éire Óg	2-11 - 0-13	Ballymartle	Church Road
	J Malone 0-7, M Sheehan 1-1, M Long 1-1, N Brennan 0-1, P Bradley 0-1.		G Cummins 0-6, P Coughlan 0-3, C Sheehan 0-2, F Murphy 0-1, A McCarthy 0-1.

14 May 2000 First round	Na Piarsaigh	0-09 - 3-05	Valley Rovers	Páirc Liam Mhic Cárthaigh
	T O'Sullivan 0-6, T Coleman 0-1, S O'Sullivan 0-1, J Gardiner 0-1.		J Hurley 2-0, C O'Donovan 1-1, E Collins 0-3, R O'Sullivan 0-1.

15 May 2000 First round	Killeagh	1-11 - 1-07	Cobh	St. Catherine's Park
	J Deane 0-8, J Collins 1-0, J Walsh 0-2, D Irwin 0-1.		V O'Rourke 1-0, M Daly 0-3, D Barrett 0-3, G Morgan 0-1.

19 May 2000 First round	Aghada	2-13 - 2-06	St. Vincent's	Páirc Uí Chonaill
	V Morrissey 2-1, R Lewis 0-6, T O'Keeffe 0-3, D Devoy 0-2, G Melvin 0-1.		C Hartnett 1-2, K Goulding 1-0, A Buckley 0-3, J Canniffe 0-1.

19 May 2000 First round	Delanys	2-15 - 1-12	Glen Rovers	Páirc Uí Rinn
	B Egan 1-6, J Egan 1-5, G O'Neill 0-2, J O'Driscoll 0-1, K Foley 0-1.		P Burke 0-6, J Coughlan 0-4, P Power 1-0, N Harte 0-2.

2 June 2000 First round	Argideen Rangers	1-14 - 1-04	Milford	Ballyanley
	B Harte 1-1, M Walsh 0-4, M O'Callaghan 0-3, B Hennessy 0-3, J Crowley 0-1, E Harrington 0-1, M Foley 0-1.		D O'Brien 1-3, R Geary 0-1.

=== Second round ===
10 June 2000 Second round	Inniscarra	3-09 - 1-12	Youghal	Rivertsown Sportsfield
	S Holland 1-2, P O'Riordan 1-1, J O'Mahony 1-0, D Holland 0-2, T Ahern 0-1, J Olden 0-1, D O'Leary 0-1, J Lynch 0-1.		S O'Connell 1-3, E Coleman 0-4, A Murphy 0-2, B Hogan 0-1, JP Joyce 0-1, B Coleman 0-1.

10 June 2000 Second round	St. Vincent's	4-09 - 3-11	Cloughduv	Ovens
	A Buckley 1-7, B Healy 1-2, J Buckley 1-0, J Canniffe 1-0.		K Murray 1-6, J Barry-Murphy 2-0, J Grainger 0-2, T Barry-Murphy 0-2, L Drummy 0-1.

10 June 2000 Second round	Tracton	0-11 - 0-11	Milford	Mallow
	F Walsh 0-5, J Kingston 0-2, H Sisk 0-1, M Kingston 0-1, T Collins 0-1, P Kingston 0-1.		M Morrissey 0-4, S Curtin 0-3, D O'Brien 0-2, P O'Brien 0-1, N Geary 0-1.

11 June 2000 Second round	Newcestown	2-13 - 2-09	Cobh	Páirc Uí Rinn
	P Kenneally 0-8, P Condon 1-2, N O'Sullivan 1-1, J O'Callaghan 0-1, E O'Donovan 0-1.		D Barrett 0-5, V O'Rourke 1-0, M Meaney 1-0, P Sloane 0-2, P Meaney 0-1, M Daly 0-1.

11 June 2000 Second round	Aghabullogue	1-12 - 1-10	Glen Rovers	Ballyanley
	J Kelleher 1-1, P Kelleher 0-4, J Healy 0-3, Denis O'Leary 0-2, D Murphy 0-1, N Buckley 0-1.		Colin Buckley 1-1, P Burke 0-4, G O'Riordan 0-3, J Coughlan 0-1, J Williams 0-1.

11 June 2000 Second round	Bandon	2-19 - 4-14	Ballymartle	Páirc Uí Ríogáin
	D O'Donoghue 0-7, R Sweetnam 1-2, J Burke 0-3, G O'Donovan 1-0, D Burke 0-2, K Hurley 0-2, M Mehigan 0-2, J O'Regan 0-1.		G Cummins 2-6, P Coughlan 1-5, A McCarthy 1-1, N Sheehan 0-2.

4 July 2000 Second round replay	Tracton	3-09 - 1-11	Milford	Mallow
	J Kingston 2-1, M Kingston 1-0, F Walsh 0-3, M Quinn 0-2, H Sisk 0-2, S O'Sullivan 0-1.		M Morrissey 0-8, J Cremin 1-1, R Geary 0-1, S O'Gorman 0-1.

- Na Piarsaigh received a bye in this round.

=== Third round ===
22 July 2000 Third round	Blarney	5-11 - 3-04	Na Piarsaigh	Delanys GAA Grounds
	R McNamara 4-0, A Shanahan 1-3, S O'Donoghue 0-2, C Sheehan 0-2, D McCarthy 0-2, J Downey 0-1, J Hurley 0-1.		S Óg Ó hAilpín 1-1, T Coleman 1-0, M Mullins 1-0, D O'Sullivan 0-3.

16 July 2000 Third round	Aghada	1-15 - 2-06	Argideen Rangers	Páirc Uí Rinn
	R Lewis 0-10, D Creedon 1-0, R Dwane 0-2, K O'Keeffe 0-1, M Lewis 0-1, P O'Neill 0-1.		M O'Callaghan 1-1, M Foley 1-1, M Walsh 0-3, B Harte 0-1.

16 July 2000 Third round	Killeagh	1-15 - 0-11	Éire Óg	Blackrock
	J Deane 1-4, M Landers 0-4, D Irwin 0-2, A Budds 0-2, L Collins 0-2, G Scully 0-1.		T Cronin 0-7, F Sheehan 0-1, J Crowley 0-1, P Bradley 0-1, M Sheehan 0-1.

16 July 2000 Third round	Kilbrittain	4-09 - 2-11	Newcestown	Charlie Hurley Park
	D O'Connell 1-4, O Sexton 2-0, D McSweeney 1-0, E Sheehy 0-3, N Crowley 0-1, D Long 0-1.		P Kenneally 0-9, P Condon 2-2.

=== Fourth round ===
15 July 2000 Fourth round	St. Vincent's	1-14 - 0-16	St. Finbarr's	Ballinlough
	A Buckley 0-9, B Healy 1-2, C Hartnett 0-1, J Canniffe 0-1, J Buckley 0-1.		B O'Shea 0-5, K McTiernan 0-2, N Hosford 0-2, F Lehane 0-2, D Hurley 0-2, E Griffin 0-1, S McCarthy 0-1, P Forde 0-1.

16 July 2000 Fourth round	Douglas	0-12 - 0-06	Ballymartle	Minane Bridge
	R O'Hara 0-4, B Boyle 0-3, G McLoughlin 0-2, M Coveney 0-1, K Hogan 0-1, D Larkin 0-1.		G Cummins 0-4, J Tobin 0-1, P Deasy 0-1.

21 July 2000 Fourth round	Mallow	2-14 - 0-09	Valley Rovers	Blarney
	R O'Connell 0-8, P Dineen 1-3, J Hayes 1-0, T O'Riordan 0-1, M Buckley 0-1, P Buckley 0-1.		E Collins 0-5, A Crowley 0-2, R O'Donovan 0-1, A Quirke 0-1.

22 July 2000 Fourth round	Inniscarra	3-09 - 1-12	Bride Rovers	Riverstown Sportsfield
	S Holland 0-6, J Olden 1-2, J Hogan 1-1, D Holland 1-0.		J O'Driscoll 0-6, T Broderick 1-0, P Cotter 0-3, P Murphy 0-2, Brian Murphy 0-1.

23 July 2000 Fourth round	Aghada	4-12 - 2-16	Carrigtwohill	Cloyne
	R Lewis 1-6, R Dwane 1-1, K O'Keeffe 1-1, V Morrissey 1-1, T O'Keeffe 0-1, P O'Neill 0-1.		M Fitzgerald 0-6, S McCarthy 1-1, J O'Connor 1-1, S Farrell 0-3, J Barrett 0-3, N McCarthy 0-1, J Roche 0-1.

23 July 2000 Fourth round	Killeagh	0-13 - 1-09	Aghabullogue	Páirc Uí Rinn
	J Deane 0-6, G Scully 0-4, M Landers 0-2, A Budd 0-1.		D O'Leary 1-5, E Twomey 0-2, D Twomey 0-1, P Kelleher 0-1.

23 July 2000 Fourth round	Delanys	2-11 - 2-05	Tracton	Shanbally
	D Quinlan 1-2, K Foley 1-2, J Egan 0-4, B Egan 0-1, T Kiely 0-1, G Healy 0-1.		F Walsh 1-2, M Quinn 1-0, J Kingston 0-2, S O'Sullivan 0-1.

5 August 2000 Fourth round	Kilbrittain	0-14 - 1-09	Blarney	Cloughduv
	D O'Connell 0-6, T Brennan 0-3, O Sexton 0-1, D McSweeney 0-1, D Long 0-1, A Hayes 0-1, D Hickey 0-1.		A Shanahan 0-5, T Harrington 1-0, R McNamara 0-2, E McCarthy 0-1, J Downey 0-1.

=== Quarter-finals ===
6 August 2000 Quarter-final	Aghada	2-14 - 2-10	St. Vincent's	Riverstown Sportsfield
	R Lewis 0-6, T O'Keeffe 1-2, D Creedon 1-1, G Melvin 0-2, D Devoy 0-1, P O'Neill 0-1, JP O'Connor 0-1.		A Buckley 0-6, J Buckley 1-2, JP Murphy 1-0, K Goulding 0-1, J Canniffe 0-1.

20 August 2000 Quarter-final	Delanys	3-16 - 5-08	Killeagh	Páirc Uí Chonaill
	J Egan 1-8, K Foley 1-2, J O'Driscoll 1-1, M McElhinney 0-3, G Healy 0-1, B Egan 0-1.		J Deane 2-3, L Collins 1-3, M Landers 1-1, A Leahy 1-0, J O'Connor 0-1.

25 August 2000 Quarter-final	Mallow	2-09 - 1-11	Inniscarra	Grenagh
	P Dineen 1-6, F McCormack 1-0, R Sheehan 0-1, R Galvin 0-1, J Hayes 0-1.		J Hogan 1-1, S Holland 0-3, P Riordan 0-3, D O'Leary 0-1, T Ahern 0-1, D Holland 0-1, D O'Riordan 0-1.

1 September 2000 Quarter-final	Douglas	0-12 - 0-09	Kilbrittain	Cloughduv
	B Boyle 0-4, P Barry 0-3, T Twomey 0-2, G Wade 0-1, D Twohig 0-1, G McLoughlin 0-1.		D O'Connell 0-4, P Sexton 0-1, J O'Brien 0-1, A Hayes 0-1, D Hickey 0-1.

=== Semi-finals ===
16 September 2000 Semi-final	Douglas	1-14 - 0-16	Delanys	Páirc Uí Chaoimh
	R O'Hara 1-1, T Twomey 0-4, P Barry 0-4, G McLoughlin 0-2, B Boyle 0-2, K Hogan 0-1.		J Egan 0-4, B Egan 0-3, D Quinlan 0-3, M McElhinney 0-2, K Foley 0-2, P O'Connell 0-1, K Egan 0-1.

23 September 2000 Semi-final	Aghada	1-10 - 0-13	Mallow	Páirc Uí Chaoimh
	R Lewis 0-6, T O'Keeffe 1-1, V Morrissey 0-2, P O'Neill 0-1.		R O'Connell 0-6, P Dineen 0-3, T O'Riordan 0-2, J Walsh 0-1, B Carey 0-1.

8 October 2000 Semi-final replay	Aghada	4-10 - 1-16	Mallow	Páirc Uí Chaoimh
	V Morrissey 2-3, D Creedon 2-0, R Lewis 0-5, G Melvin 0-1, D Devoy 0-1.		R O'Connell 0-9, F McCormack 1-0, J Walsh 0-3, M Buckley 0-2, B Carey 0-1, D Kerrisk 0-1.

=== Final ===
22 October 2000 Final	Douglas	3-08 - 2-04	Aghada	Páirc Uí Chaoimh
	B Boyle 1-3, R Gunn 1-0, R O'Hara 1-0, T Twomey 0-3, K Hogan 0-1, G McLoughlin 0-1.		R Lewis 2-2, D Devoy 0-1, V Morrissey 0-1.

== Championship statistics ==
=== Top scorers ===
Overall

Rank	Player	Club	Tally	Total	Matches	Average
1	Richie Lewis	Aghada	3-41	50	7	7.14
2	Ray O'Connell	Mallow	1-29	32	4	8.00
3	Joe Deane	Killeagh	3-21	30	4	7.50
3	Dan O'Connell	Kilbrittain	2-24	30	4	7.50
5	Pa Dineen	Mallow	5-13	28	4	7.00
5	Anthony Buckley	St. Vincent's	1-25	28	4	7.00
7	James Egan	Delanys	2-21	27	3	9.00
7	Pat Kenneally	Newcestown	1-24	27	3	9.00
9	Vincent Morrissey	Aghada	5-08	23	7	3.28
10	Ger Cummins	Ballymartle	2-16	22	3	7.33

In a single game

Rank	Player	Club	Tally	Total	Opposition
1	Dan O'Connell	Kilbrittain	1-10	13	Inniscarra
2	Ross McNamara	Blarney	4-00	12	Na Piarsaigh
2	Ger Cummins	Ballymartle	2-06	12	Bandon
4	James Egan	Delanys	1-08	11	Killeagh
5	Pa Dineen	Mallow	3-01	10	Cloughduv
5	Pat Kenneally	Newcestown	1-07	10	Bride Rovers
5	Anthony Buckley	St. Vincent's	1-07	10	Cloughduv
5	Richie Lewis	Aghada	0-10	10	Argideen Rangers
9	Joe Deane	Killeagh	2-03	9	Delanys
9	Vincent Morrissey	Aghada	2-03	9	Mallow
9	Ray O'Connell	Mallow	1-06	9	Cloughduv
9	Barry Egan	Delanys	1-06	9	Glen Rovers
9	Kevin Murray	Cloughduv	1-06	9	St. Vincent's
9	Richie Lewis	Aghada	1-06	9	Carrigtwohill
9	Pa Dineen	Mallow	1-06	9	Inniscarra
9	Anthony Buckley	St. Vincent's	0-09	9	St. Finbarr's
9	Pat Kenneally	Newcestown	0-09	9	Kilbrittain
9	Ray O'Connell	Mallow	0-09	9	Aghada
