= 2009 Cork Intermediate Hurling Championship =

Irish hurling competition

- Dates: 2 May 2009 – 13 September 2009
- Sponsor: Evening Echo
- Champions: Valley Rovers (1st title); Kevin Canty (captain); Pat Kenneally (manager)
- Runners-up: Kilworth; Damien McNamara (captain); Jack Russell (manager)
- Relegated: Delanys

Tournament statistics
- Matches played: 27
- Goals scored: 55 (2.04 per match)
- Points scored: 686 (25.41 per match)
- Top scorer(s): Adrian Mannix (2-49)

The 2009 Cork Intermediate Hurling Championship was the 100th staging of the Cork Intermediate Hurling Championship since its establishment by the Cork County Board in 1909. The draw for the opening round fixtures took place on 13 December 2008. The championship began on 2 May 2009 and ended on 13 September 2009.

On 13 September 2009, Valley Rovers won the championship after a 1–17 to 1–13 defeat of Kilworth in the final at Páirc Uí Chaoimh. This was their second championship title overall and their first title since 1989. Delanys returned to junior status for the first time in 21 years after suffering a five-point defeat by Ballygarvan in a relegation play-off.

Kilworth's Adrian Mannix was the championship's top scorer with 2-49.

== Team changes ==
=== To Championship ===
Promoted from the Cork Junior A Hurling Championship

- Dripsey

Relegated from the Cork Premier Intermediate Hurling Championship

- Aghada

=== From Championship ===
Promoted to the Cork Premier Intermediate Hurling Championship

- Carrigaline

Relegated to the City Junior A Hurling Championship

- St. Finbarr's

== Results ==
=== First round ===
2 May 2009 First round	Cobh	3-12 - 2-12	St. Vincent's	Caherlag Sportsfield
	J Meaney 1-7, B Aherne 1-2, D McCarthy 1-0, D Barrett 0-2, P Sloane 0-1.		A Buckley 0-9, C Barry 2-0, D Murphy 0-1, J Buckley 0-1, A Long 0-1.

2 May 2009 First round	Milford	0-13 - 0-16	Kilworth	Kildorrery
	M Morrissey 0-5, S O'Connell 0-5, H O'Gorman 0-1, A Watson 0-1, D Corkery 0-1.		A Mannix 0-11, L Whelan 0-2, P Lynch 0-2, A Kenny 0-1.

2 May 2009 First round	Dromina	2-14 - 0-15	Delanys	Croke Memorial Park
	A O'Shaughnessy 0-7, K Hayes 1-2, B Boles 1-0, J O'Shaughnessy 0-3, D Morrissey 0-1, P Hayes 0-1.		P Finnegan 0-7, K Foley 0-3, A Cafferky 0-1, S O'Connor 0-1, P Blake 0-1, D O'Connor 0-1, M McIlhinney 0-1.

2 May 2009 First round	Ballygarvan	1-08 - 1-09	Kilbrittain	Brinny Spotsfield
	M Kennefick 0-4, K Ashman 1-0, M O'Riordan 0-2, G White 0-1, L Dillon 0-1.		D Desmond 1-3, M Sexton 0-2, O Sexton 0-1, J Wall 0-1, P O'Mahony 0-1, R Cashman 0-1.

3 May 2009 First round	Blackrock	0-10 - 1-13	Barryroe	Riverstick
	P O'Sullivan 0-4, M Drummond 0-2, JP Carroll 0-1, M Russell 0-1, B Cashman 0-1, P Tierney 0-1.		K Griffin 0-8, P Collins 1-1, JJ O'Donovan 0-2, M O'Brien 0-1, C Hurley 0-1.

6 May 2009 First round	Aghada	0-08 - 2-08	Valley Rovers	Páirc Uí Chaoimh
	T O'Keeffe 0-4, V Morrissey 0-3, A Morrissey 0-1.		E Collins 2-1, G Rice 0-3, J Hurley 0-3, E Manning 0-1.

8 May 2009 First round	Éire Óg	2-10 - 0-10	Bandon	Cloughduv
	J Dineen 0-6, K Hallissey 1-2, D O'Herlihy 1-0, T O'Leary 0-1, J Crowley 0-1.		D Crowley 0-5, D Lucey 0-1, E O'Donovan 0-1, D O'Donoghue 0-1, R Payne 0-1, R Crowley 0-1.

8 May 2009 First round	Dripsey	1-10 - 0-11	Kanturk	Croke Memorial Park
	D O'Riordan 0-6, J Hogan 1-0, D O'Sullivan 0-2, D Foley 0-1, D Buckley 0-1.		L McLoughlin 0-6, D Duane 0-2, A Walsh 0-1, W Murphy 0-1, J Healy 0-1.

=== Second round ===
5 June 2009 Second round	Milford	1-12 - 2-15	St. Vincent's	Páirc Eoin Mhic Charthaigh
	S O'Connell 0-9, T Flynn 1-0, A Watson 0-1, M Morrissey 0-1, P O'Regan 0-1.		C Barry 2-1, D Collins 0-6, A Long 0-2, A Buckley 0-2, J Daly 0-1, D Murphy 0-1, T Hornibrook 0-1, A Fenton 0-1.

5 June 2009 Second round	Bandon	1-21 - 2-07	Delanys	Brinny Sportsfield
	D Crowley 0-7, D Lucey 0-6, R Payne 0-5, E O'Donovan 1-0, D O'Donoghue 0-2, C Dullea 0-1.		P Finnegan 1-2, K Foley 0-4, G Quinlan 1-0, E Cullinane 0-1.

6 June 2009 Second round	Kanturk	1-14 - 2-12	Blackrock	Mallow GAA Complex
	L McLoughlin 0-6, A Walsh 1-1, J Healy 0-3, D Duane 0-2, W Murphy 0-1, C Burke 0-1.		B Cashman 1-1, B Hennebry 0-4, JP Carroll 1-0, P Deasy 0-3, E Hegarty 0-2, E O'Farrell 0-1, D Coughlan 0-1.

17 July 2009 Second round	Aghada	1-16 - 0-07	Ballygarvan	Páirc Uí Rinn
	T O'Keeffe 1-7, E Healy 0-2, V Morrissey 0-2, S O'Keeffe 0-1, P O'Neill 0-1, P Wall 0-1, C Fleming 0-1, F Day 0-1.		M Kennefick 0-3, W O'Halloran 0-1, G White 0-1, C Ó Conchúir 0-1, A Murphy 0-1.

=== Third round ===
12 June 2009 Third round	Kilworth	0-14 - 1-11	Kilbrittain	Ballincollig
	A Mannix 0-10, J Cahill 0-2, L Whelan 0-1, P Lynch 0-1.		J Wall 0-6, P O'Mahony 1-2, D Desmond 0-2, C Moloney 0-1.

12 June 2009 Third round	Barryroe	0-13 - 0-19	Bandon	Henry Ford Park
	K Griffin 0-8, K McCarthy 0-1, T Harrington 0-1, G Coleman 0-1, C Hurley 0-1, J O'Donovan 0-1.		R Crowley 0-10, D Lucey 0-3, N Geary 0-2, J Dullea 0-2, D O'Donoghue 0-1, C Dullea 0-1.

12 June 2009 Third round	St. Vincent's	2-06 - 0-15	Blackrock	Páirc Uí Rinn
	A Buckley 1-1, D Collins 0-4, J Daly 1-0, D Murphy 0-1.		B Hennebry 0-5, E Hegarty 0-3, D O'Shea 0-2, A Browne 0-2, P Deasy 0-1, P Cashman 0-1, E O'Farrell 0-1.

19 June 2009 Third round replay	Kilworth	2-11 - 1-07	Kilbrittain	Cloughduv
	S O'Brien 2-1, A Mannix 0-4, P Lynch 0-3, D Cahill 0-2, B Tobin 0-1.		J Wall 0-6, R Cashman 1-0, P O'Mahony 0-1.

19 June 2009 Third round	Cobh	0-14 - 0-22	Éire Óg	Páirc Liam Mhic Cárthaigh
	J Meaney 0-5, D Barrett 0-3, P Sloane 0-2, E Wilson 0-2, T Byrne 0-1, B Aherne 0-1.		C Sheehan 0-10, J Dineen 0-4, K Hallissey 0-4, D Goulding 0-3, D O'Herlihy 0-1.

=== Relegation playoffs ===
12 June 2009 Semi-final	Delanys	1-13 - 3-21	Milford	Castletownroche
	P Finnegan 1-5, K Foley 0-5, M O'Driscoll 0-1, C Foley 0-1, A Cafferkey 0-1.		S O'Connell 0-11, M Morrissey 1-2, M O'Connell 1-1, P O'Regan 1-0, T O'Flynn 0-3, H O'Gorman 0-2, A Watson 0-2.

4 August 2009 Semi-final	Kanturk	3-15 - 1-15	Ballygarvan	Castletownroche
	A Nash 1-5, L McLoughlin 0-5, B O'Keeffe 1-0, M O'Riordan 1-0, A Walsh 0-2, B Mullane 0-1, D Duane 0-1, J Healy 0-1.		M Kennefick 0-9, M O'Riordan 1-0, T Quilligan 0-3, A Murphy 0-1, C Ó Conchúir 0-1, G White 0-1.

29 August 2009 Final	Delanys	0-11 - 1-15	Ballygarvan	Ballinhassig
	K Foley 0-7, P Finnegan 0-4.		M Kennefick 0-7, M O'Riordan 1-0, D Bouse 0-2, D O'Sullivan 0-2, W O'Halloran 0-1, G White 0-1, K Ashman 0-1, T Quilligan 0-1.

=== Quarter-finals ===
18 July 2009 Quarter-final	Kilworth	2-13 - 0-16	Bandon	Ballincollig
	A Mannix 1-5, D Cahill 1-1, P Lynch 0-4, S O'Brien 0-1, J Cahill 0-1, L Whelan 0-1.		R Crowley 0-7, D Crowley 0-3, D O'Donoghue 0-3, E O'Donovan 0-1, D Lucey 0-1, R Payne 0-1.

25 July 2009 Quarter-final	Valley Rovers	2-17 - 1-11	Dromina	Coachford Sportsfield
	E Collins 1-10, K Canty 1-0, J Hurley 0-3, T Burke 0-3, B Lehane 0-1.		P Goold 1-3, A O'Shaughnessy 0-5, J O'Shaughnessy 0-1, D Carroll 0-1, P Hayes 0-1.

7 August 2009 Quarter-final	Aghada	2-09 - 1-11	Dripsey	Páirc Uí Rinn
	P O'Neill 2-0, V Morrissey 0-2, C Fleming 0-2, T O'Keeffe 0-2, S O'Keeffe 0-1, B Crowley 0-1, M Galvin 0-1.		D O'Riordan 1-5, D Buckley 0-1, C Hayes 0-1, G Murphy 0-1, D O'Sullivan 0-1, D Buckley 0-1, J Carey 0-1.

9 August 2009 Quarter-final	Blackrock	1-12 - 1-10	Éire Óg	Páirc Uí Chaoimh
	B Hennebry 0-5, M Drummond 1-0, D Kelleher 0-3, E O'Farrell 0-1, R Curtin 0-1, M Russell 0-1, L Meaney 0-1.		J Dineen 0-5, D O'Flynn 1-0, K Hallissey 0-3, D O'Flynn 0-1, A O'Mahony 0-1.

=== Semi-finals ===
30 August 2009 Semi-final	Valley Rovers	3-11 - 0-11	Aghada	Páirc Uí Chaoimh
	E Collins 2-1, K Canty 1-2, J Hurley 0-3, B Lehane 0-2, R Lehane 0-1, E Manning 0-1, R O'Donovan 0-1.		C Fleming 0-5, V Morrissey 0-2, T O'Keeffe 0-2, J Connolly 0-1, P O'Neill 0-1.

5 September 2009 Semi-final	Kilworth	0-17 - 0-13	Blackrock	Páirc Uí Rinn
	A Mannix 0-10, P Lynch 0-3, S O'Brien 0-2, L Whelan 0-1, M O'Connor 0-1.		B Hennebry 0-5, S O'Donoghue 0-2, M Drummond 0-2, M Russell 0-2, D Kelleher 0-1, K Murphy 0-1.

=== Final ===
13 September 2009 Final	Valley Rovers	1-17 - 1-13	Kilworth	Páirc Uí Chaoimh
	J Hurley 0-8, E Collins 0-7, B Lehane 1-1, J Young 0-1.		A Mannix 1-9, P Lynch 0-2, J Cahill 0-1, S O'Brien 0-1.	Referee: C Lyons (Nemo Rangers)

== Championship statistics ==
=== Top scorers ===
Overall

Rank	Player	Club	Tally	Total	Matches	Average
1	Adrian Mannix	Kilworth	2-49	55	6	9.16
2	Éamonn Collins	Valley Rovers	5-19	34	4	8.50
3	Seánie O'Connell	Milford	0-25	25	3	8.33
4	Paul Finnegan	Delanys	2-18	24	4	6.00
5	Mark Kennefick	Ballygarvan	0-23	23	4	5.75
6	Barry Hennebry	Blackrock	0-19	19	4	4.75
6	Kevin Foley	Delanys	0-19	19	4	4.75
7	Trevor O'Keeffe	Aghada	1-15	18	4	4.50
7	Ronan Crowley	Bandon	0-18	18	3	6.00
8	Lorcán McLoughlin	Kanturk	0-17	17	3	5.66
8	Jermey Hurley	Valley Rovers	0-17	17	4	4.25

In a single game

Rank	Player	Club	Tally	Total	Opposition
1	Éamonn Collins	Valley Rovers	1-10	13	Dromina
2	Adrian Mannix	Kilworth	1-09	12	Valley Rovers
3	Adrian Mannix	Kilworth	0-11	11	Milford
3	Seánie O'Connell	Milford	0-11	11	Delanys
4	Jer Meaney	Cobh	1-07	10	St. Vincent's
4	Trevor O'Keeffe	Aghada	1-07	10	Ballygarvan
4	Adrian Mannix	Kilworth	0-10	10	Kilbrittain
4	Ronan Crowley	Bandon	0-10	10	Barryroe
4	Ciarán Sheehan	Éire Óg	0-10	10	Cobh
4	Adrian Mannix	Kilworth	0-10	10	Blackrock
