= 1995 Cork Intermediate Hurling Championship =

Irish hurling competition

- Dates: 3 June 1995 – 8 October 1995
- Teams: 26
- Champions: Kilbrittain (1st title); Dan O'Connell (captain)
- Runners-up: Ballincollig; Barry Gleeson (captain)

Tournament statistics
- Matches played: 25
- Goals scored: 79 (3.16 per match)
- Points scored: 515 (20.6 per match)
- Top scorer(s): Dan O'Connell (4-20)

The 1995 Cork Intermediate Hurling Championship was the 86th staging of the Cork Intermediate Hurling Championship since its establishment by the Cork County Board in 1909. The draw for the opening fixtures took place on 11 December 1994. The championship began on 3 June 1995 and ended on 8 October 1995.

On 8 October 1995, Kilbrittain won the championship following a 2-17 to 1-05 defeat of Ballincollig in the final at Páirc Uí Chaoimh. This was their first ever championship title.

Kilbrittain's Dan O'Connell was the championship's top scorer with 4-20.

== Team changes ==
=== From Championship ===
Promoted to the Cork Senior Hurling Championship

- St. Catherine's

=== To Championship ===
Promoted from the Cork Junior A Hurling Championship

- Carrigtwohill

== Results ==
=== First round ===
3 June 1995 First round	Blackrock	1-05 - 5-17	Aghabullogue	Ballincollig
	A Cummins 1-2, F Barry 0-2, C Smith 0-1.		T Ó Murchú 3-1, J Healy 0-8, T Tarrant 1-3, J McSweeney 0-4, K Barry-Murphy 1-0, D Ring 0-1.

17 June 1995 First round	St. Vincent's	2-04 - 2-13	Ballymartle	Manning Park
	J Daly 1-0, D Murphy 1-0, D O'Callaghan 0-3, K Goulding 0-1.		P Hickey 1-1, G Cummins 1-1, J O'Mahony 0-3, F Murphy 0-2, C Deasy 0-2, P O'Mahony 0-1, C Sheehan 0-1, P Coughlan 0-1, M Allen 0-1.

17 June 1995 First round	Delanys	2-19 - 1-12	Na Piarsaigh	Páirc Uí Rinn
	B Egan 1-9, McElhinney 1-1, D Quinlan 0-2 G Healy 0-2, D McElhinney 0-2, D Power 0-2, B Buckley 0-1.		M Mullins 1-9, P Martin 0-1, D Daly 0-1, G Shaw 0-1.

17 June 1995 First round	Newcestown	1-14 - 0-09	Midleton	Páirc Uí Rinn
	P Condon 0-5, C Crowley 1-1, P Crowley 0-4, D Long 0-2, D McCarthy 0-1.		M Carlton 0-7, M Quirke 0-1, B Gleeson 0-1.

24 June 1995 First round	Mallow	1-09 - 2-10	Kilbrittain	Ballyanley
	R O'Connell 1-4, T O'Riordan 0-3, A Ahern 0-1, R Sheehan 0-1.		D O'Connell 1-5, P Harrington 1-2, C O'Donoghue 0-1, G O'Connell 0-1, F O'Mahony 0-1.

24 June 1995 First round	Éire Óg	2-08 - 2-11	Valley Rovers	Cloughduv
	P Coakley 1-4, M Brennan 1-1, M Sheehan 0-1, K Sheehan 0-1, P Bradley 0-1.		C O'Donovan 1-3, J Shiels 0-4, F Twohig 1-0, D Kiely 0-3, B O'Sullivan 0-1.

25 June 1995 First round	Bishopstown	3-08 - 3-13	Inniscarra	Ovens
	S Murphy 1-4, D Coughlan 1-1, C Doyle 1-0, J Murphy 0-1, B O'Shea 0-1, E O'Farrell 0-1.		P Maher 0-8, M o'Reganb 2-1, P Ahern 1-0, D Holland 0-2, G O'Mahony 0-1, C Holland 0-1.

25 June 1995 First round	Glen Rovers	1-15 - 0-07	Cloughduv	Ballinhassig
	M Geaney 0-6, C Buckley 1-1, R O'Connor 0-2, C Walsh 0-2, E Gough 0-1, D Cooper 0-1, C Murphy 0-1, J Anderson 0-1.		T Barry-Murphy 0-3, T O'Mahony 0-2, J Grainger 0-1, M Nyhan 0-1.

1 July 1995 First round	Blarney	2-07 - 4-15	Cloyne	Church Road
	A Murphy 2-0, G Nagle 0-3, S O'Donoghue 0-1, F Coleman 0-1, T Harrington 0-1, P Barry 0-1.		P Cahill 2-4, D Óg Cusack 1-4, G Lewis 1-1, P O'Shea 0-2, M Cahill 0-2, O McCarthy 0-1, D Motherway 0-1.

2 July 1995 First round	St. Finbarr's	0-13 - 2-04	Newtownshandrum	Castletownroche
	F Lehane 0-5, E Walsh 0-5, B O'Shea 0-2, I O'Mahony 0-1.		D Mulcahy 1-2, J Ryan 1-0, P Mulcahy 0-1, J Geary 0-1.

=== Second round ===
2 July 1995 Second round	Ballincollig	5-06 - 2-08	Tracton	Páirc Uí Rinn
	P O'Mahony 1-5, G Galvin 2-0, K O'Donoghue 1-0, A Beale 1-0, G McCullagh 0-1.		J Kingston 1-2, B Long 1-0, K Kingston 0-3, F Walsh 0-2, P Murphy 0-1.

8 July 1995 Second round	Douglas	0-12 - 3-11	Aghada	Páirc Shéamuis de Barra
	P Barry 0-5, M Twomey 0-5, P Walsh 0-1, E SHarkey 0-1.		R Lewis 0-9, C Counihan 2-0, G Sheehan 1-0, Peter Cahman 0-1, M Lewis 0-1.

15 July 1995 Second round	Kilbrittain	3-11 - 2-09	St. Finbarr's	Jack Barrett Park
	T Brennan 1-2, D O'Connell 0-5, N Crowley 1-0, T McCarthy 1-0, D O'Neill 0-2, C O'Donoghue 0-1, E Sheehy 0-1.,		M Desmond 1-0, E Fitzpatrick 1-0, T Leahy 0-2, P Forde 0-2, E Walsh 0-1, S McCarthy 0-1, E Griffin 0-1, F Lehane 0-1, B O'Shea 0-1.

15 July 1995 Second round	Glen Rovers	4-07 - 3-11	Ballymartle	Páirc Liam Mhic Cárthaigh
	M Corbett 1-2, P Power 1-1, J Anderson 1-0, C Buckley 1-0, C Walsh 0-2, D Cooper 0-1, R O'Connor 0-1.		P Deasy 1-7, C Deasy 2-2, P O'Mahony 0-1, J O'Mahony 0-1.

16 July 1995 Second round	Carrigtwohill	0-10 - 1-12	Cobh	Killeagh
	E O'Mahony 0-4, J O'Connor 0-3, S O'Farrell 0-1, S Collins 0-1, N Gibbons 0-1.		R Meaney 0-6, J Hodnett 1-0, P Looney 0-3, V O'Rourke 0-2, D Meaney 0-1.

21 July 1995 Second round	Delanys	1-12 - 0-10	Valley Rovers	Ballincollig
	M McElhinney 1-4, J Healy 0-5, B Buckley 0-1, M O'Neill 0-1, B Egan 0-1.		J Hurley 0-2, B O'Sullivan 0-2, TJ Deasy 0-2, J Shiels 0-2, C O'Donovan 0-1, D Kiely 0-1.

22 July 1995 Second round	Inniscarra	3-08 - 0-11	CLoyne	Páirc Uí Rinn
	P Maher 2-2, C Holland 1-0, M O'Regan 0-2, K O'Connell 0-1, P Aherne 0-1, D Holland 0-1, M Harte 0-1.		Philip Cahill 0-4, G Lewis 0-2, P O'Shea 0-1, D Óg Cusack 0-1, M Cahill 0-1, J Cotter 0-1, S Aherne 0-1.

22 July 1995 Second round	Newcestown	0-15 - 1-08	Aghabullogue	Cloughduv
	P Crowley 0-5, C Crowley 0-3, J O'Sullivan 0-2, D Long 0-1, D McCarthy 0-1, C McSweeney 0-1, E Kenneally 0-1, P Condon 0-1.		J Healy 1-5, K Barry-Murphy 0-1, P Martin 0-1, T Tarrant 0-1.

=== Quarter-finals ===
19 August 1995 Quarter-final	Newcestown	2-15 - 1-02	Inniscarra	Cloughduv
	P Crowley 0-6, P Condon 1-2, C Crowley 1-0, D Long 0-2, E Kenneally 0-1, C McSweeney 0-1, J O'Sullivan 0-1, K Long 0-1, D Wilson 0-1.		P Maher 1-2.

19 August 1995 Quarter-final	Ballymartle	1-13 - 2-04	Aghada	Páirc Uí Rinn
	C Deasy 1-1, J O'Mahony 0-3, A McCarthy 0-3, P Deasy 0-3, P O'Mahony 0-2, M Fitzpatrick 0-1.		R lewis 1-3, M Lewis 1-0, R Dwane 0-1.

26 August 1995 Quarter-final	Kilbrittain	2-13 - 3-09	Delanys	Ballinhassig
	D O'Connell 1-4, E Sheehy 0-4, C O'Donoghue 1-0, T Brennan 0-3, G O'Connell 0-1, T McCarthy 0-1.		D McElhinney 1-1, G Healy 0-4, D Power 1-0, D Quinlan 1-0, B Egan 0-3, M McElhinney 0-1.

10 September 1995 Quarter-final	Ballincollig	0-16 - 2-09	Cobh	Ted Hanley Memorial Park
	D Murphy 0-9, A Beale 0-3, P O'Mahony 0-1, F O'Callaghan 0-1, J Dwyer 0-1, K O'Donoghue 0-1.		P Looney 1-1, J Hodnett 1-0, D Barrett 0-3, M Daly 0-2, R Meaney 0-1, M Meaney 0-1, D Meaney 0-1.

=== Semi-finals ===
11 September 1995 Semi-final	Kilbrittain	0-09 - 0-07	Newcestown	Charlie Hurley Park
	D O'Connell 0-4, J O'Connell 0-2, D O'Neill 0-1, N Crowley 0-1, T Brennan 0-1.		P Condon 0-2, E Kenneally 0-2, P Crowley 0-1, J O'Sullivan 0-1, D McCarthy 0-1.

24 September 1995 Semi-final	Ballincollig	0-13 - 0-09	Ballymartle	Páirc Uí Chaoimh
	P O'Mahony 0-8, A Beale 0-2, F O'Callaghan 0-2, D Murphy 0-1.		John O'Mahony 0-2, M Fitzpatrick 0-1, F Murphy 0-1, G Cummins 0-1, C Sheehan 0-1, P Deasy 0-1, C Deasy 0-1, A McCarthy 0-1.

=== Final ===
8 October 1995 Final	Kilbrittain	2-17 - 1-05	Ballincollig	Páirc Uí Chaoimh
	D O'Connell 2-2, C O'Donoghue 0-6, N Crowley 0-3, P Harrington 0-2, D Healy 0-2, T Brennan 0-1, T McCarthy 0-1.		G Galvin 1-0, D Beale 0-2, D Murphy 0-1, A Beale 0-1, P O'Mahony 0-1.

== Championship statistics ==
=== Top scorers ===
Overall

Rank	Player	Club	Tally	Total	Matches	Average
1	Dan O'Connell	Kilbrittain	4-20	32	5	6.40
2	Paul Maher	Inniscarra	3-12	21	3	7.00
3	Podsie O'Mahony	Ballincollig	1-15	18	4	4.50
4	Joe Healy	Aghabullogue	1-13	16	2	8.00
4	Barry Egan	Delanys	1-13	16	3	5.33
4	Pádraig Crowley	Newcestown	0-16	16	4	4.00
7	Cormac Deasy	Ballymartle	3-06	15	4	3.75
7	Richie Lewis	Aghada	1-12	15	2	7.50
9	Philip Cahill	Cloyne	2-08	14	2	7.00
9	Paudie Deasy	Ballymartle	1-11	14	3	4.66

In a single game

Rank	Player	Club	Tally	Total	Opposition
1	Barry Egan	Delanys	1-09	12	Na Piarsaigh
1	Mickey Mullins	Na Piarsaigh	1-09	12	Delanys
3	Tomás Ó Murchú	Aghabullogue	3-01	10	Blackrock
3	Philip Cahill	Cloyne	2-04	10	Blarney
3	Paudie Deasy	Ballymartle	1-07	10	Glen Rovers
6	Richie Lewis	Aghada	0-09	9	Douglas
6	Dan Murphy	Ballincollig	0-09	9	Cobh
8	Cormac Deasy	Ballymartle	2-02	8	Glen Rovers
8	Paul Maher	Inniscarra	2-02	8	Cloyne
8	Dan O'Connell	Kilbrittain	2-02	8	Ballincollig
8	Joe Healy	Aghabullogue	1-05	8	Newcestown
8	Dan O'Connell	Kilbrittain	1-05	8	Mallow
8	Podsie O'Mahony	Ballincollig	1-05	8	Tracton
8	Joe Healy	Aghabullogue	0-08	8	Blackrock
8	Paul Maher	Inniscarra	0-08	8	Bishopstown
8	Podsie O'Mahony	Ballincollig	0-08	8	Ballymartle
