= 1993 Cork Intermediate Hurling Championship =

Irish hurling competition

- Dates: 15 May 1993 – 12 September 1993
- Teams: 24
- Champions: Youghal (4th title); Tony Coyne (captain); Donal O'Grady (manager)
- Runners-up: Kilbrittain; Denis Healy (captain); Kieran O'Driscoll (manager)

Tournament statistics
- Matches played: 24
- Goals scored: 72 (3 per match)
- Points scored: 479 (19.96 per match)
- Top scorer: Eoin Coleman (2-27)

The 1993 Cork Intermediate Hurling Championship was the 84th staging of the Cork Intermediate Hurling Championship since its establishment by the Cork County Board in 1909. The championship began on 15 May 1993 and ended on 12 September 1993.

On 12 September 1993, Youghal won the championship following a 2-13 to 3-07 defeat of Kilbrittain in the final at Páirc Uí Rinn. This was their fourth championship title overall and their first title since 1988.

Youghal's Eoin Coleman was the championship's top scorer with 2-27.

== Team changes ==
=== From Senior Championship ===
Promoted to the Cork Senior Hurling Championship

- Bishopstown (secured promotion but continued to participate in the Cork IHC with their second team)

=== From Junior Championship ===
Promoted from the Cork Junior A Hurling Championship

- Aghada
- Newcestown
- Newtownshandrum

== Results ==
=== First round ===
15 May 1993 First round	Youghal	1-08 - 1-05	Newtownshandrum	Páirc Mac Gearailt
	T Coyne 1-4, E Coleman 0-2, D Burns 0-1, A Murphy 0-1.		J Coughlan 0-5, G Morrisssey 1-0.

4 June 1993 First round	Douglas	4-10 - 2-06	Midleton	Erin's Own Grounds
	P Walsh 1-4, P Brown 1-2, J Quirke 1-1, P Lynch 1-1, T Twomey 0-1, J Lynch 0-1.		B Gleeson 1-3, M O'Mahony 1-0, W Wallace 0-2, K Roche 0-1.

18 June 1993 First round	St. Finbarr's	1-15 - 1-12	Cloughduv	Charlie Hurley Park
	B O'Connell 0-5, J Tobin 1-1, I O'Mahony 0-4, F Lehane 0-4, C Ryan 0-1.		T Barry-Murphy 1-8, K Murray 0-2, P Murray 0-1, L Dromey 0-1.

19 June 1993 First round	Inniscarra	3-04 - 1-17	Delanys	Ovens
	D Murphy 0-4, D Holland 1-0, C Holland 1-0, D Hennessy 1-0.		B Egan 0-6, K Egan 1-2, M McElhinney 0-3, G Healy 0-2, D McElhinney 0-2, D Quinn 0-2.

27 June 1993 First round	St. Vincent's	0-10 - 2-16	Newcestown	Ovens
	W Leahy 0-7, J Gould 0-2, W McCarthy 0-1.		P Kenneally 0-9, B White 2-1, J O'Sullivan 0-2, P Crowley 0-2, M O'Mahony 0-1, P Condon 0-1.

28 June 1993 First round	Blackrock	1-08 - 1-13	Na Piarsaigh	Páirc Uí Rinn
	K Murphy 1-1, D Coakley 0-2, M Harrington 0-2, D O'Sullivan 0-1, P O'Leary 0-1, J O'Flynn 0-1.		J O'Meara 1-1, J O'Connor 0-4, R Dalton 0-2, T Allen 0-2, P Kelleher 0-2, K Butterworth 0-1, A Goulding 0-1.

2 July 1993 First round	Éire Óg	0-11 - 0-12	Ballymartle	Ballinhassig
	M Sheehan 0-6, P Bradley 0-2, C Sheehan 0-1, P Coakley 0-1, P O'Flynn 0-1.		J O'Mahony 0-3, C Deasy 0-2, P Coakley 0-1, K Lordan 0-1, G Cummins 0-1, P O'Mahony 0-1, P Deasy 0-1, E McCarthy 0-1.

11 July 1993 First round	St. Catherine's	2-08 - 0-10	Aghabullogue	Ballinlough
	M Walsh 1-0, D O'Leary 1-0, C Clancy 0-3, C Casey 0-2, J Sheehan 0-1, D Walsh 0-1, K Morrison 0-1.		N Looney 0-3, P Martin 0-3, J Healy 0-2, D Ring 0-1, M Walsh 0-1.

=== Second round ===
11 June 1993 Second round	Ballincollig	0-04 - 2-10	Aghada	Páirc Uí Chaoimh
	P O'Mahony 0-3, M O'Mahony 0-1.		R Lewis 0-8, C O'Brien 2-0, D Creedon 0-1, M Lewis 0-1.

11 June 1993 Second round	Kilbrittain	2-12 - 0-07	Cloyne	Ballinora
	G O'Connell 1-2, D O'Connell 0-4, T Brennan 1-0, D Healy 0-3, T McCarthy 0-2, D O'Neill 0-1.		A O'Brien 0-4, M Cahill 0-1, G Lewis 0-1, D Motherway 0-1.

18 June 1993 Second round	Cobh	0-14 - 2-07	Glen Rovers	Páirc Shéamuis de Barra
	R Meaney 0-9, M Walker 0-2, G Morgan 0-1, A Leahy 0-1, D Barrett 0-1.		D Whitley 1-3, C O'Riordan 1-2, P Power 0-1, P Barry 0-1.

3 July 1993 Second round	Mallow	3-11 - 1-07	Bishopstown	Grenagh
	A Ahern 2-1, R O'Connell 0-5, J Hayes 1-0, M Lehane 0-3, S Murphy 0-1, L Tobin 0-1.		T O'Leary 1-0, D Coughlan 0-3, L Jones 0-1, D Fleming 0-1, R O'Doherty 0-1, K O'Donoghue 0-1.

9 July 1993 Second round	Na Piarsaigh	3-06 - 1-12	Youghal	Páirc Uí Chonaill
	J O'Meara 1-5, G Maguire 2-0, A Goudling 0-1.		E Coleman 1-3, T Coyne 0-3, L O'Leary 0-3, W Joyce 0-2, A Murphy 0-1.

11 July 1993 Second round	Delanys	2-10 - 1-12	Newcestown	Ovens
	G Healy 0-5, P Cummins 1-0, D McElhinney 1-0, M McElhinney 0-3, D Quinlan 0-2.		P Kenneally 0-4, D Long 1-0, D Wilson 0-3, P Condon 0-1, B White 0-1, D McCarthy 0-1, E Desmond 0-1, M O'Mahony 0-1.

14 July 1993 Second round	Douglas	1-05 - 0-13	St. Finbarr's	Ballinlough
	P Walsh 0-4, T Twomey 1-0, P Lynch 0-1.		F Lehane 0-5, J Tobin 0-3, J O'Connor 0-2, P O'Keeffe 0-1, T Finn 0-1, A O'Regan 0-1.

17 July 1993 Second round replay	Na Piarsaigh	0-08 - 3-05	Youghal	Páirc Shéamuis de Barra
	J O'Meara 0-3, P Kelleher 0-2, C Feeney 0-2, C Lynch 0-1.		R Byrne 2-0, O Coleman 1-2, W Joyce 0-2, V Murray 0-1.

17 July 1993 Second round	St. Catherine's	1-12 - 3-07	Ballymartle	Erin's Own Grounds
	D Walsh 1-3, C Clancy 0-6, M Walsh 0-1, K Morrison 0-1, P O'Donoghue 0-1.		C Deasy 2-1, P Deasy 0-5, P O'Mahony 1-1.

=== Quarter-finals ===
17 July 1993 Quarter-final	Mallow	1-14 - 1-07	Cobh	Bride Rovers Park
	F McCormack 1-3, R O'Connell 0-6, A Ahern 0-4, R Sheehan 0-1.		R Meaney 0-6, J Butler 1-0, G Morgan 0-1.

18 July 1993 Quarter-final	Kilbrittain	4-13 - 0-04	Aghada	Páirc Uí Chaoimh
	T McCarthy 3-1, T brennan 0-5, J O'Connell 1-0, D Healy 0-3, M Holland 0-1, D O'Connell 0-1, J McSweeney 0-1, D O'Neill 0-1.		R Lewis 0-2, P O'Brien 0-1, M Lewis 0-1.

30 July 1993 Quarter-final	Youghal	3-12 - 3-08	Delanys	Clonmult Memorial Park
	E Coleman 0-8, R Byrne 2-0, B Hogan 1-1, T Coyne 0-2, L O'Leary 0-1.		P Cummins 1-0, T Cooney 1-0, M Moynihan 1-0, G Healy 0-3, D Quinlan 0-2, B Egan 0-1, M McElhinney 0-1, E Healy 0-1.

1 August 1993 Quarter-final	Ballymartle	1-14 - 1-11	St. Finbarr's	Carrigaline
	C Deasy 1-1, P Deasy 0-4, J O'Mahony 0-3, J Cummins 0-3, F Murphy 0-1, A McCarthy 0-1, P O'Mahony 0-1.		J Tobin 1-2, F Lehane 0-4, J O'Connor 0-2, B O'Connell 0-2, P O'Keeffe 0-1.

=== Semi-finals ===
7 August 1993 Semi-final	Kilbrittain	3-16 - 2-09	Mallow	Coachford Sportsfield
	J O'Sullivan 2-3, T Brennan 0-8, T McCarthy 1-1, D O'Connell 0-2, M Holland 0-1, D Healy 0-1.		R O'Connell 0-7, J Hayes 1-0, B Murphy 1-0, A Ahern 0-1, F McCormack 0-1.

14 August 1993 Semi-final	Youghal	2-14 - 1-10	Ballymartle	Páirc Uí Rinn
	E Coleman 0-7, B Hogan 1-0, L O'Leary 1-0, R Byrne 0-3, T Coyne 0-3, M Walsh 0-1.		P Deasy 0-6, C Deasy 1-1, P O'Mahony 0-1, J O'Mahony 0-1, M Allen 0-1.

=== Final ===
12 September 1993 Final	Youghal	2-13 - 3-07	Kilbrittain	Páirc Uí Rinn
	E Coleman 0-5, T Coyne 1-1, B Hogan 1-0, R Byrne 0-2, JP Joyce 0-2, L O'Leary 0-1, A Murphy 0-1, W Joyce 0-1.		D O'Connell 2-2, J O'Sullivan 1-0, T Brennan 0-3, J O'Connell 0-1, M Holland 0-1.

== Championship statistics ==
=== Top scorers ===
Overall

Rank	Player	Club	Tally	Total	Matches	Average
1	Eoin Coleman	Youghal	2-27	33	6	5.50
2	Tony Coyne	Youghal	2-13	19	6	3.16
2	Tom Brennan	Kilbrittain	1-16	19	4	4.75
4	Ray O'Connell	Mallow	0-18	18	3	6.00
5	Cormac Deasy	Ballymartle	4-05	17	4	4.25
5	Richard Byrne	Youghal	4-05	17	6	2.83
7	Tim McCarthy	Kilbrittain	4-04	16	4	4.00
7	Pádraig Deasy	Ballymartle	0-16	16	4	4.00
9	Joe O'Meara	Na Piarsaigh	2-09	15	3	5.00
9	Dan O'Connell	Kilbrittain	2-09	15	4	3.75
9	Richie Meaney	Cobh	0-15	15	2	7.50

In a single game

Rank	Player	Club	Tally	Total	Opposition
1	Tim Barry-Murphy	CLoughduv	1-08	11	St. Finbarr's
2	Tim McCarthy	Kilbrittain	3-01	10	Aghada
3	Jim O'Sullivan	Kilbrittain	2-03	9	Mallow
3	Pat Kenneally	Newcestown	0-09	9	St. Vincent's
3	Richie Meaney	Cobh	0-09	9	Glen Rovers
5	Dan O'Connell	Kilbrittain	2-02	8	Youghal
5	Joe O'Meara	Na Piarsaigh	1-05	8	Youghal
5	Richie Lewis	Aghada	0-08	8	Ballincollig
5	Eoin Coleman	Youghal	0-08	8	Delanys
5	Tom Brennan	Kilbrittain	0-08	8	Mallow

=== Miscellaneous ===
- The first round tie between Blackrock and Na Piarsaigh was the first championship match in any grade to be played at the newly-opened Páirc Uí Rinn.
