= 2002 Cork Intermediate Hurling Championship =

Irish hurling competition

- Dates: 27 April 2002 – 13 October 2002
- Teams: 24
- Sponsor: TSB Bank
- Champions: Delanys (1st title)
- Runners-up: Carrigtwohill

Tournament statistics
- Matches played: 40
- Goals scored: 100 (2.5 per match)
- Points scored: 874 (21.85 per match)
- Top scorer(s): John Egan (0-38)

The 2002 Cork Intermediate Hurling Championship was the 93rd staging of the Cork Intermediate Hurling Championship since its establishment by the Cork County Board in 1909. The draw for the 2002 opening round fixtures took place on 9 December 2001. The championship began on 27 April 2002 and ended on 13 October 2002.

On 13 October 2002, Delanys won the championship after a 1–13 to 0–14 defeat of Carrigtwohill in a final replay at Páirc Uí Chaoimh. It remains their only championship title in the grade.

Delanys' John Egan was the championship's top scorer with 0-38.

== Team changes ==
=== To Championship ===
Promoted from the Cork Junior A Hurling Championship

- Courcey Rovers

=== From Championship ===
Promoted to the Cork Senior Hurling Championship

- Killeagh

Regraded to the South West Junior A Hurling Championship

- Argideen Rangers

Regraded to the Mid Cork Junior A Hurling Championship

- Cloughduv

Declan Collins lifted the trophy proudly after the match.

== Results ==
=== First round ===
27 April 2002 First round	Kilbrittain	4-11 - 2-10	Delanys	Jack Barrett Park
	D O'Connell 0-8, A Hayes 2-0, O Sexton 1-1, M Holland 0-1, P Sexton 0-1.		J Egan 0-4, M O'Driscoll 1-0, G Healy 1-0, K Egan 0-3, K Egan 0-1, B Egan 0-1, D Collins 0-1.

3 May 2002 First round	Éire Óg	1-10 - 1-13	Ballymartle	Riverstick
	T Cronin 0-5, M Long 1-0, J Malone 0-3, C Óg Sheehan 0-2.		G Cummins 0-8, J Tobin 1-1, P Coughlan 0-3, K Lordan 0-1.

4 May 2002 First round	Bandon	0-11 - 0-07	Bishopstown	Riverstick
	D O'Donoghue 0-7, G O'Donovan 0-2, J O'Regan 0-1, K Hurley 0-1.		D O'Mahony 0-3, J Murphy 0-2, T Bogue 0-1, K O'Donoghue 0-1.

4 May 2002 First round	Tracton	3-11 - 3-09	Blarney	Church Road
	J Kingston 1-2, K Lynch 1-1, P Kingston 1-1, F Walsh 0-3, D O'Sullivan 0-2, H Sisk 0-1, M Kingston 0-1.		A Shanahan 1-5, R McNamara 1-2,

4 May 2002 First round	Youghal	1-09 - 2-10	Bride Rovers	Páirc Lios gCúl
	P Coyne 1-1, BN Hogan 0-2, M Walsh 0-1, D Ring 0-1, L Byrne 0-1, J Joyce 0-1, BJ Hogan 0-1.		B Hazelwood 1-7, J O'Driscoll 1-0, S Ryan 0-2, R Cahill 0-1.

4 May 2002 First round	St. Vincent's	0-16 - 2-12	Milford	Castletownroche
	A Buckley 0-10, R O'Halloran 0-2, D McCarthy 0-2, C Hartnett 0-1, JP Murphy 0-1.		M Morrissey 0-6, N Geary 1-0, D Leonard 1-0, R Geary 0-3, A Sexton 0-1, B Hehir 0-1, P O'Brien 0-1.

4 May 2002 First round	Newcestown	0-10 - 0-10	Courcey Rovers	Brinny Sportsfield
	C O'Donovan 0-6, B O'Donovan 0-1, A O'Sullivan 0-1, P Kenneally 0-1, P Condon 0-1.		N Murphy 0-6, B Hayes 0-1, S Hayes 0-1, V Hurley 0-1, M O'Donovan 0-1.

4 May 2002 First round	Mallow	3-11 - 0-13	Aghada	Watergrasshill
	P Dineen 1-3, B Carey 1-2, R Sheehan 1-0, R Galvin 0-2, A Aherne 0-2, F McCormack 0-1, M Maher 0-1.		R Lewis 0-5, B Morrissey 0-4, G Melvin 0-3, D Devoy 0-1.

10 May 2002 First round	Inniscarra	1-14 - 0-10	St. Finbarr's	Cloughduv
	D O'Riordan 1-4, M O'Sullivan 0-3, R Cummins 0-2, J Cummins 0-1, C Holland 0-1, S Holland 0-1, D Holland 0-1, J O'Mahony 0-1.		K Kelleher 0-6, B O'Shea 0-2, S Barry 0-1, C O'Brien 0-1.

11 May 2002 First round	Aghabullogue	2-12 - 3-09	Cobh	Páirc Uí Chaoimh
	D Barrett 1-4, G Meaney 1-4, B Ahern 1-0, M Daly 0-1.		F Foley 0-5, D Murphy 1-1, J Spillane 1-0, D Twomey 0-2, D Kiely 0-2, D O'Leary 0-1, E Twomey 0-1.

12 May 2002 First round	Glen Rovers	0-03 - 0-09	Carrigtwohill	Riverstown Sportsfield
	P Burke 0-1, R Brosnan 0-1, D Goggin 0-1.		S Collins 0-3, M Fitzgerald 0-2, N McCarthy 0-2, S McCarthy 0-1, S O'Farrell 0-1.

18 May 2002 First round	Valley Rovers	1-06 - 0-04	Nemo Rangers	Minane Bridge
	J Hurley 1-2, E Collins 0-2, R Butler 0-2.		B Twomey 0-2, M Cronin 0-2.

18 May 2002 First round replay	Aghabullogue	0-08 - 2-04	Cobh	Caherlag Sportsfield
	F Foley 0-4, J Foley 0-1, D Murphy 0-1, D O'Leary 0-1, P Kelleher 0-1.		J Meaney 0-4, B Ahern 1-0, S Donachie 1-0.

18 May 2002 First round replay	Newcestown	0-13 - 0-13 (aet)	Courcey Rovers	Charlie Hurley Park
	C O'Donovan 0-5, P Kenneally 0-3, P Condon 0-1, D McCarthy 0-1, P Moloney 0-1, A O'Sullivan 0-1, B O'Donovan 0-1.		N Murphy 0-6, V Hurley 0-2, S Twomey 0-2, D Twomey 0-2, M O'Donovan 0-1.

7 June 2002 First round second replay	Newcestown	1-04 - 0-11	Courcey Rovers	Páirc Liam Mhic Cárthaigh
	D Desmond 1-0, J O'Sullivan 0-1, P Crowley 0-1, E Twomey 0-1, D McCarthy 0-1.		M O'Donovan 0-3, J Murphy 0-3, N Murphy 0-3, D Hayes 0-1, S Hayes 0-1.

=== Second round ===
18 May 2002 Second round	Bishopstown	5-14 - 3-05	St. Vincent's	Church Road
	D O'Mahony 1-8, D McCarthy 2-0, J Murphy 0-5, B Healy 1-1, T Bogue 1-0.		S Ray 2-1, JP Murphy 1-0, F Murphy 0-2, R O'Halloran 0-1, A Buckley 0-1.

18 May 2002 Second round	Youghal	1-13 - 2-11	St. Finbarr's	Caherlag Sportsfield
	E Coleman 0-8, M Walsh 1-1, L Byrne 0-2, JP Joyce 0-1, V Murray 0-1.		F Murray 2-2, K Kelleher 0-6, EP O'Callaghan 0-2, B O'Shea 0-1.

24 May 2002 Second round	Aghada	0-16 - 1-08	Nemo Rangers	Páirc Shéamuis de Barra
	V Morrissey 0-5, B Morrissey 0-4, R Lewis 0-4, G Melvin 0-2, Mark Lewis 0-1.		J Masters 0-6, W Morgan 1-0, M Cronin 0-1, I Murphy 0-1.

25 May 2002 Second round	Blarney	2-08 - 2-08	Aghabullogue	Páirc Liam Mhic Cárthaigh
	C Sheehan 1-1, C O'Keeffe 1-0, J Hurley 0-2, J Hughes 0-2, A Shanahan 0-2, P O'Connor 0-1.		F Foley 1-1, D Twomey 0-4, D Murphy 1-0, D O'Leary 0-2, P O'Rourke 0-1.

7 June 2002 Second round	Glen Rovers	0-08 - 0-09	Delanys	Páirc Uí Rinn
	J Egan 0-3, J O'Driscoll 0-2, B Egan 0-2, T Kiely 0-1, K Foley 0-1.		S McGrath 0-6, K O'Callaghan 0-1, D Goggin 0-1.

7 June 2002 Second round replay	Blarney	1-06 - 1-08	Aghabullogue	Ballincollig
	J Hurley 1-0, A Shanahan 0-3, J Hughes 0-2, E McCarthy 0-1.		D O'Leary 1-2, D Twomey 0-3, P Kelleher 0-2, E Twomey 0-1.

28 June 2002 Second round	Éire Óg	2-07 - 2-14	Newcestown	Cloughduv
	J Malone 2-2, T Cronin 0-2, D Corkery 0-1, N Brennan 0-1, M Healy 0-1.		N O'Sullivan 1-2, C O'Donovan 1-1, B O'Donovan 0-4, P Kenneally 0-3, P Condon 0-2, N Twohig 0-1, D McCarthy 0-1.

=== Third round ===
28 June 2002 Third round	Kilbrittain	2-15 - 0-08	Milford	Blarney
	A Hayes 2-1, D O'Connell 0-6, E Sheehy 0-3, P Sexton 0-2, M Holland 0-1, E Sexton 0-1, J O'Brien 0-1.		R Geary 0-3, M Morrissey 0-3.

29 June 2002 Third round	Ballymartle	1-16 - 0-13	Bride Rovers	Páirc Uí Rinn
	G Cummins 1-9, R O'Dwyer 0-3, B O'Dwyer 0-1, P Couglan 0-1, P O'Dwyer 0-1.		B Hazelwood 0-6, T Broderick 0-3, M Hogan 0-2, R Cahill 0-1, B Johnson 0-1.

6 July 2002 Third round	Inniscarra	2-07 - 3-13	Courcey Rovers	Ballinhassig
	J Hogan 1-0, D Holland 1-0, D O'Riordan 0-2, S Holland 0-2, M O'Sullivan 0-1, D Buckley 0-1, P O'Riordan 0-1.		S Twomey 1-4, M O'Donovan 1-3, J Murphy 1-2, V Hurley 0-2, S Hayes 0-1, B Hayes 0-1.

7 July 2002 Third round	Valley Rovers	0-13 - 2-13	Newcestown	Jack Barrett Park
	J Hurley 0-8, J Burke 0-2, M Kelleher 0-2, J O'Donovan 0-1.		P Kenneally 0-9, B O'Mahony 1-1, N O'Sullivan 1-0, D McCarthy 0-2, P Crowley 0-1.

13 July 2002 Third round	Bishopstown	0-08 - 3-19	Aghada	Clonmult Memorial Park
	D O'Mahony 0-3, C Kelly 0-2, B Cuthbert 0-2, T Bogue 0-1.		V Morrissey 1-4, B Morrissey 1-2, J Murphy 1-1, T O'Keeffe 0-3, D Devoy 0-2, D Creedon 0-2, P Cashman 0-1, R Dwane 0-1, P O'Neill 0-1, R Lewis 0-1, B Henry 0-1.

20 July 2002 Third round	Bandon	0-10 - 2-10	Carrigtwohill	Páirc Uí Chaoimh
	D O'Donoghue 0-4, G O'Donovan 0-2, J Nyhan 0-1, J O'Regan 0-1, K Hurley 0-1, D Lucey 0-1.		M Fitzgerald 1-4, N McCarthy 0-4, Seán O'Farrell 1-0, Séamus O'Farrell 0-2.

20 July 2002 Third round	Tracton	2-15 - 0-24	Delanys	Carrigaline
	D Walsh 2-2, K Lynch 0-6, F Walsh 0-4, M Kinsgton 0-3.		J Egan 0-12, M McElhinney 0-4, K Foley 0-3, B Egan 0-2, J O'Driscoll 0-2, P O'Connell 0-1.

21 July 2002 Third round	Cobh	2-11 - 2-16	St. Finbarr's	Páirc Shéamuis de Barra
	P Sloane 1-3, J Griffin 1-0, S Donachie 0-2, G Meaney 0-2, D O'Rourke 0-1, R O'Connell 0-1, C O'Sullivan 0-1.		K Kelleher 1-5, C Duffy 0-5, J McCarthy 1-1, K McTiernan 0-2, EP O'Callaghan 0-1, S Barry 0-1, F Murray 0-1.

2 August 2002 Third round	Aghabullogue	2-12 - 2-09	Mallow	Fr. Kelleher Park
	D Murphy 2-2, E Twomey 0-3, D O'Leary 0-2, F Foley 0-2, D Twomey 0-2, P Kelleher 0-1.		F McCormack 2-3, P Dineen 0-3, A Ahern 0-2, T O'Riordan 0-1.

=== Fourth round ===
10 August 2002 Fourth round	Kilbrittain	0-10 - 1-10	Courcey Rovers	Riverstick
	D O'Connell 0-4, J O'Brien 0-2, E Sheedy 0-2, A Hayes 0-1, P Sexton 0-1.		M O'Donovan 1-4, J Murphy 0-3, S Twomey 0-1, V Hurley 0-1, N Murphy 0-1.

=== Quarter-finals ===
23 August 2002 Quarter-final	Courcey Rovers	3-16 - 3-04	Aghada	Páirc Uí Chaoimh
	N Murphy 2-3, M O'Donovan 0-5, J Murphy 1-1, S Hayes 0-4, V Hurley 0-2, D Twomey 0-1.		V Morrissey 1-3, D Creedon 1-1, R Lewis 1-0.

24 August 2002 Quarter-final	Delanys	1-13 - 1-11	Aghabullogue	Blarney Sportsfield
	J Egan 0-5, M McElhinney 1-1, J O'Driscoll 0-3, M O'Driscoll 0-2, K Egan 0-1, B Egan 0-1.		F Foley 0-8, D Murphy 1-0, D Twomey 0-2, D O'Leary 0-1.

24 August 2002 Quarter-final	Newcestown	3-12 - 1-11	Ballymartle	Brinny Sportsfield
	D Desmond 2-0, N O'Sullivan 1-1, P Condon 0-4, P Kenneally 0-4, E Twomey 0-1, D Collins 0-1, A O'Sullivan 0-1.		G Cummins 0-6, K Lordan 1-0, B Dwyer 0-3, R Dwyer 0-1, C Deasy 0-1.

30 August 2002 Quarter-final	Carrigtwohill	0-15 - 0-15	St. Finbarr's	Páirc Uí Chonaill
	M Fitzgerald 0-7, Seán O'Farrell 0-5, D Healy 0-1, N McCarthy 0-1, J Roche 0-1.		V Cooney 0-9, EP O'Callaghan 0-3, J McCarthy 0-2, A Fleury 0-1.

7 September 2002 Quarter-final	Carrigtwohill	4-10 - 0-06	St. Finbarr's	Páirc Uí Chonaill
	M Fitzgerald 2-4, D Healy 1-2, Seán O'Farrell 1-1, N McCarthy 0-2, Séamus O'Farrell 0-1.		V Cooney 0-3, E Griffin 0-1, K McTiernan 0-1, F Murray 0-1.

=== Semi-finals ===
15 September 2002 Semi-final	Carrigtwohill	0-20 - 0-11	Newcestown	Páirc Uí Chaoimh
	M Fitzgerald 0-6, Séamus O'Farrell 0-3, N McCarthy 0-3, D Healy 0-2, J Barrett 0-2, Seán O'Farrell 0-1, N Furlong 0-1, S Barry 0-1, J Roche 0-1.		P Kenneally 0-5, J O'Sullivan 0-2, P Condon 0-2, A O'Sullivan 0-1, D McCarthy 0-1.

22 September 2002 Semi-final	Delanys	2-12 - 1-13	Courcey Rovers	Páirc Uí Chaoimh
	J Egan 0-7, M McElhinney 1-1, J O'Driscoll 1-1, C Foley 0-3.		M O'Donovan 1-3, S Hayes 0-3, N Murphy 0-3, B Hayes 0-2, V Hurley 0-1, D Hayes 0-1.

=== Final ===
13 October 2002 Final	Delanys	1-13 - 0-14	Carrigtwohill	Páirc Uí Chaoimh
	J Egan 0-7, B Egan 1-1, J O'Driscoll 0-1, K Egan 0-1, P O'Connell 0-1, M O'Driscoll 0-1, M McElhinney 0-1.		M Fitzgerald 0-5, J Barrett 0-3, Séamus O'Farrell 0-2, N McCarthy 0-2, J Roche 0-1, Seán O'Farrell 0-1.

== Championship statistics ==
=== Top scorers ===
Overall

Rank	Player	Club	Tally	Total	Matches	Average
1	John Egan	Delanys	0-38	38	6	6.33
2	Michael Fitzgerald	Carrigtwohill	3-28	37	6	6.16
3	Michael O'Donovan	Courcey Rovers	3-20	29	7	4.14
4	Niall Murphy	Courcey Rovers	2-22	28	7	4.00
5	Ger Cummins	Ballymartle	1-23	26	3	8.66
6	Pat Kenneally	Newcestown	0-25	25	7	3.57
7	Finbarr Foley	Aghabullogue	1-20	23	5	4.60
8	Kevin Kelleher	St. Finbarr's	1-17	20	3	6.66
9	Vincent Morrissey	Aghada	2-12	18	3	6.00
9	Dan O'Connell	Kilbrittain	0-18	18	3	6.00

In a single game

Rank	Player	Club	Tally	Total	Opposition
1	Ger Cummins	Ballymartle	1-09	12	Bride Rovers
1	John Egan	Delanys	0-12	12	Tracton
2	Donal O'Mahony	Bishopstown	1-08	11	St. Vincent's
3	Michael Fitzgerald	Carrigtwohill	2-04	10	St. Finbarr's
3	Barry Hazelwood	Bride Rovers	1-07	10	Youghal
3	Anthony Buckley	St. Vincent's	0-10	10	Milford
4	Fergal McCormack	Mallow	2-03	9	Aghabullogue
4	Niall Murphy	Courcey Rovers	2-03	9	Aghada
4	Pat Kenneally	Newcestown	0-09	9	Valley Rovers
4	Victor Cooney	St. Finbarr's	0-09	9	Carrigtwohill
