= 1990 Cork Intermediate Hurling Championship =

Irish hurling competition

- Dates: 27 May 1990 – 23 September 1990
- Teams: 22
- Champions: St. Finbarr's (1st title); Malachy Kennedy (captain)
- Runners-up: Tracton; Martin Quinn (captain)

Tournament statistics
- Matches played: 25
- Goals scored: 100 (4 per match)
- Points scored: 502 (20.08 per match)
- Top scorer(s): Ronan Sheehan (0-37)

The 1990 Cork Intermediate Hurling Championship was the 81st staging of the Cork Intermediate Hurling Championship since its establishment by the Cork County Board in 1909. The draw for the opening round fixtures took place on 17 December 1989. The championship began on 27 May 1990 and ended on 23 September 1990.

On 23 September 1990, St. Finbarr's won the championship following a 1-08 to 0-10 defeat of Tracton in the final at Páirc Uí Chaoimh. This was their first ever championship title.

Mallow's Ronan Sheehan was the championship's top scorer with 0-37.

== Results ==
=== First round ===
27 May 1990 First round	Delanys	1-08 - 1-15	St. Finbarr's	Mayfield Grounds
	E Healy 1-5, B Egan 0-1, M McElhinney 0-1, P Doolan 0-1.		B O'Shea 1-8, J Tobin 0-1, J Meyler 0-1, T Leahy 0-1, B Searls 0-1, F O'Brien 0-1, P O'Shea 0-1, C Finn 0-1.

27 May 1990 First round	Bishopstown	2-06 - 1-13	Ballymartle	Páirc Liam Mhic Cárthaigh
	A O'Sullivan 0-4, L Twomey 1-0, V Murray 1-0, L Jones 0-1, N Crowley 0-1.		M Fitzpatrick 0-6, J O'Mahony 0-5, M Allen 1-0, P Dorney 0-1, K McCarthy 0-1.

27 May 1990 First round	St. Vincent's	1-05 - 1-07	Cobh	Erin's Own
	T Gould 1-0, W Welsh 0-2, D Murphy 0-1, T Kearney 0-1, B Coutts 0-1.		C Crowe 1-1, E O'Connell 0-2, B Frahill 0-1, P Kavanagh 0-1, B Kearney 0-1, N O'Connell 0-1.

10 June 1990 First round	Mallow	0-14 - 2-07	Éire Óg	Coachford Sportsfield
	R O'Connell 0-5, R Sheehan 0-4, R Glynn 0-2, T Coakley 0-1, P Shine 0-1, J Walsh 0-1.		C Óg Sheehan 1-2, J Murphy 1-0, D Desmond 0-3, P O'Flynn 0-2.

10 June 1990 First round	Kilbrittain	6-07 - 1-13	St. Catherine's	Páirc Uí Chaoimh
	C O'Connell 2-0, T McCarthy 2-0, J O'Connell 1-1, D O'Connell 1-1, D Healy 0-2, F Sheehy 0-1, T Brennan 0-1, John O'Connell 0-1.		C Clancy 0-11, M Mellerick 1-0, B O'Regan 0-1, D O'Leary 0-1.

19 June 1990 First round	Cloyne	1-14 - 0-07	Blackrock	Páirc Shéamuis de Barra
	Phil Cahill 1-5, P O'Shea 0-4, G Lewis 0-2, T O'Sullivan 0-1, Paul Cahill 0-1, J Lewis 0-1.		T O'Mahony 0-3, E Kavanagh 0-2, P O'Neill 0-1, M Salmon 0-1.

=== Second round ===
27 May 1990 Second round	Inniscarra	2-15 - 2-06	Cloughduv	Coachford Sportsfield
	G Manley 0-6, P O'Connell 1-2, K Murphy 1-0, M O'Donoghue 0-3, P Ahern 0-2, D Murphy 0-1, S Griffin 0-1.		K Murray 1-2, P Murray 1-1, T Barry-Murphy 0-2, C Barry-Murphy 0-1.

16 June 1990 Second round	Glen Rovers	2-09 - 1-12	Newtownshandrum	Kanturk
	P Harte 0-6, D Geaney 1-1, J O'Brien 1-0, P Power 0-1, P Barry 0-1.		D Coughlan 1-1, J Ryan 0-4, J O'Mahony 0-2, J Coughlan 0-2, G Morrissey 0-1, C Morrissey 0-1, C Holland 0-1.

23 June 1990 Second round	Douglas	4-08 - 2-12	Na Piarsaigh	Ballinlough
	P Lynch 2-3, P Walsh 1-3, T Twomey 1-1, V Kelly 0-1.		M Mullins 2-2, R Dalton 0-7, T Allen 0-1, G Maguire 0-1, C Connery 0-1.

23 June 1990 Second round	Kilbrittain	3-08 - 6-07	St. Finbarr's	Minane Bridge
	G O'Connell 2-0, D O'Connell 0-5, C O'Connell 1-0, M Holland 0-1, J O'Connell 0-1.		T Leahy 4-0, F O'Brien 1-1, J Meyler 1-0, B O'Shea 0-3, M Kennedy 0-2, T Lenihan 0-1.

24 June 1990 Second round	Cloyne	1-08 - 0-11	Ballymartle	Riverstown Sportsfield
	J Lewis 0-3, P O'Shea 1-1, Phil Cahill 0-2, T O'Sullivan 0-1, Paul Cahill 0-1.		M Fitzpatrick 0-7, E McCarthy 0-2, J O'Mahony 0-2.

24 June 1990 Second round	Ballinascarthy	0-09 - 3-03	Clyda Rovers	Cloughduv
	C Murphy 0-6, J Kingston 0-2, L Deasy 0-1.		T O'Callaghan 1-1, P Curtin 1-0, F Dorgan 1-0, J O'Sullivan 0-1, G Ambrose 0-1.

24 June 1990 Second round	Mallow	2-15 - 4-09	Cobh	St. Catherine's Park
	R Sheehan 0-8, R Glynn 2-0, R O'Connell 0-5, P Shine 0-1, G Hayes 0-1.		J Ronan 2-0, P Kavanagh 0-5, C Crowe 1-0, S O'Keeffe 1-0 (og), G Morgan 0-2, M Meaney 0-1, B Kearney 0-1.

24 June 1990 Second round	Youghal	2-05 - 2-11	Tracton	Riverstown Sportsfield
	T Coyne 1-5, P Coady 1-0.		J Kingston 1-1, M Quinn 0-4, T Kelly 1-0, B Long 0-3, M Cronin 0-1, K Kingston 0-1, L Kelly 0-1.

24 June 1990 Second round replay	Glen Rovers	1-07 - 0-14	Newtownshandrum	Kanturk
	L Dunlea 1-1, D Geaney 0-2, T Harte 0-2, K O'Brien 0-1, P Barry 0-1.		J Coughlan 0-6, D Coughlan 0-2, J Lenihan 0-2, C Morrissey 0-2, J Ryan 0-1, M Holland 0-1.

8 July 1990 Second round replay	Mallow	1-14 - 1-06	Cobh	St. Catherine's
	R Sheehan 0-11, P Buckley 1-0, J Walsh 0-2, T Coakley 0-1.		G Morgan 1-2, P Kavanagh 0-3, B Kearney 0-1.

8 July 1990 Second round replay	Cloyne	4-18 - 1-22 (aet)	Ballymartle	Riverstown Sportsfield
	G Lewis 1-5, Phil Cahill 1-5, S O'Sullivan 1-5, M Cahill 1-0, P O'Shea 0-1, A O'Brien 0-1, L Coleman 0-1.		M Fitzpatrick 0-9, J O'Mahony 0-8, T Allen 1-0, S Deasy 0-2, J McCarthy 0-1, G Cummins 0-1, P Deasy 0-1.

=== Quarter-finals ===
22 July 1990 Quarter-final	Mallow	2-10 - 3-07	Cloyne	Fitzgerald Park
	R Sheehan 0-8, J Hayes 1-0, R O'Connell 1-0, T Coakley 0-2.		T O'Sullivan 1-2, Phil Cahill 1-1, G Lewis 1-1, P O'Shea 0-2, A O'Brien 0-1.

29 July 1990 Quarter-final	Tracton	3-05 - 2-05	Douglas	Ballinhassig
	T Kelly 2-0, M Quinn 1-0, L Kelly 0-3, P Murphy 0-1, M Cronin 0-1.		P Walsh 1-2, E Forde 1-0, F Bermingham 0-1, C Toal 0-1, P Browne 0-1.

4 August 1990 Quarter-final	St. Finbarr's	4-12 - 1-09	Newtownsandrum	Fr. Con Buckley Park
	F O'Brien 3-0, J Meyler 1-2, J Tobin 0-3, B O'Shea 0-3, J McSweeney 0-2, T Leahy 0-1, C Finn 0-1.		J Ryan 1-4, D Coughlan 0-2, J Coughlan 0-1, J O'Mahony 0-1, M Holland 0-1.

5 August 1990 Quarter-final	Inniscarra	6-14 - 2-11	Clyda Rovers	Grenagh
	G Manley 1-9, J O'Mahony 2-1, D Hennessy 2-0, P Aherne 1-2, M O'Donoghue 0-2.		T O'Callaghan 1-9, M Hanlon 1-0, J O'Sullivan 0-1, K Creedon 0-1.

11 August 1990 Quarter-final replay	Mallow	3-09 - 1-11	Cloyne	Fitzgerald Park
	T Coakley 2-0, R O'Connell 0-4, J Walsh 1-0, R Sheehan 0-3, J Hayes 0-2.		Paul Cahill 1-3, J Lewis 0-3, Phil Cahill 0-3, G Lewis 0-2.

=== Semi-finals ===
19 August 1990 Semi-final	Tracton	4-08 - 1-16	Inniscarra	Páirc Uí Chaoimh
	J O'Callaghan 3-0, L Kelly 0-4, J Kingston 1-0, T Kelly 0-1, M Kinsgton 0-1, DJ Kiely 0-1, P Murphy 0-1.		G Manley 0-7, M O'Donoghue 1-1, D Hennessy 0-3, D Murphy 0-2, G O'Mahony 0-2, D Holland 0-1.

25 August 1990 Semi-final	St. Finbarr's	3-13 - 3-09	Mallow	Inniscarra
	F O'Brien 1-3, J Meyler 1-1, B O'Shea 0-4, J Tobin 1-0, T Leahy 0-3, T Linehan 0-1, T O'Sullivan 0-1.		J Hayes 2-0, T Coakley 1-1, R O'Connell 0-3, R Sheehan 0-3, R Glynn 0-2.

=== Final ===
23 September 1990 Final	St. Finbarr's	1-08 - 0-10	Tracton	Páirc Uí Chaoimh
	F O'Brien 1-2, B O'Shea 0-4, J Tobin 0-,1 J McSweeney 0-1.		Patrick Murphy 0-4, M Quinn 0-2, K Kingston 0-2, B Long 0-1, Peter Murphy 0-1.	Referee: L Flynn

== Championship statistics ==
=== Top scorers ===
Overall

Rank	Player	Club	Tally	Total	Matches	Average
1	Ronan Sheehan	Mallow	0-37	37	6	6.16
2	Flor O'Brien	St. Finbarr's	6-07	25	5	5.00
2	Philip Cahill	Cloyne	3-16	25	5	5.00
2	Ger Manley	Inniscarra	1-22	25	3	8.33
2	Billy O'Shea	St. Finbarr's	1-22	25	5	5.00
6	Martin Fitzpatrick	Ballymartle	0-22	22	3	7.33
7	Ray O'Connell	Mallow	1-17	20	5	4.00
8	Tony Leahy	St. Finbarr's	4-05	17	5	3.40
9	Timmy O'Callaghan	Clyda Rovers	2-10	16	2	8.00
9	Ger Lewis	Cloyne	2-10	16	5	3.20

In a single game

Rank	Player	Club	Tally	Total	Opposition
1	Tony Leahy	St. Finbarr's	4-00	12	Kilbrittain
1	Ger Manley	Inniscarra	1-09	12	Clyda Rovers
1	Timmy O'Callaghan	Clyda Rovers	1-09	12	Inniscarra
4	Billy O'Shea	St. Finbarr's	1-08	11	Delanys
4	Christy Clancy	St. Catherine's	0-11	11	Kilbrittain
4	Ronan Sheehan	Mallow	0-11	11	Cobh
7	Flor O'Brien	St. Finbarr's	3-00	9	Newtownshandrum
7	James O'Callaghan	Tracton	3-00	9	Inniscarra
7	Paul Lynch	Douglas	2-03	9	Na Piarsaigh
7	Martin Fitzpatrick	Ballymartle	3-00	9	Cloyne
