= 1989 Cork Intermediate Hurling Championship =

Irish hurling competition

- Dates: 27 May 1989 – 1 October 1989
- Teams: 23
- Champions: Valley Rovers (1st title); Don Looney (captain); Seán O'Brien (manager)
- Runners-up: Kilbrittain; Tom Brennan (captain); John McCarthy (manager)

Tournament statistics
- Matches played: 27
- Goals scored: 112 (4.15 per match)
- Points scored: 555 (20.56 per match)
- Top scorer(s): John Shiels (3-22)

The 1989 Cork Intermediate Hurling Championship was the 80th staging of the Cork Intermediate Hurling Championship since its establishment by the Cork County Board in 1909. The draw for the opening fixtures took place on 18 December 1988. The championship began on 27 May 1989 – 1 October 1989.

On 1 October 1989, Valley Rovers won the championship following a 6-12 to 3-05 defeat of Kilbrittain in the final at Páirc Uí Chaoimh. This was their first ever championship title.

Valley Rovers' John Shiels was the championship's top scorer with 3-22.

== Results ==
=== First round ===
27 May 1989 First round	Douglas	2-09 - 1-12	Tracton	Carrigaline
	P Walsh 1-4, M Magner 1-1, E Forde 0-3, D Larkin 0-1.		J Kingston 1-2, DJ Kiely 0-4, P Long 0-3, M Quinn 0-1, J O'Callaghan 0-1, K Kingston 0-1.

27 May 1989 First round	St. Finbarr's	2-08 - 4-11	Youghal	Castlemartyr
	K McCarthy 1-5, K Kiely 1-1, P O'Keeffe 0-1, J Tobin 0-1.		M Butler 2-1, S Ring 1-2, T O'Connell 1-1, T Coyne 0-3, M Downing 0-1, V Murray 0-1, K Lonergan 0-1.

27 May 1989 First round	Mayfield	2-06 - 2-21	Kilbrittain	Innishannon Sportsfield
	S O'Sullivan 1-2, B Huggins 1-0, M Huggins 0-3, G Casey 0-1.		T Brennan 0-15, G O'Connell 2-2, D O'Neill 0-2, J McCarthy 0-1, J O'Sullivan 0-1.

27 May 1989 First round	Bishopstown	2-07 - 1-10	Cloyne	Páirc Shéamuis de Barra
	L Tuohy 1-5, T Keating 1-0, F O'Regan 1-0, A O'Sullivan 0-2.		M Lynch 1-2, P Cahill 0-3, Joe Lewis 0-1, John Lewis 0-1, J Aherne 0-1, T O'Sullivan 0-1, G Lewis 0-1.

27 May 1989 First round	Cobh	1-11 - 0-09	Bandon	Church Road
	S Looney 1-2, G Morgan 0-4, B Kearney 0-2, M Walker 0-2, B Frahill 0-1.		P Crowley 0-7, M Cooney 0-1, J O'Donovan 0-1.

28 May 1989 First round	Éire Óg	2-09 - 2-13	Newtownshandrum	Kanturk
	M Kelleher 1-0, D Flynn 1-0, C Óg Sheehan 0-3, D Desmond 0-3, J Flynn 0-1, M Flynn 0-1, M Sheehan 0-1.		B O'Connor 1-3, G Morrissey 1-1, D Coughlan 0-4, R Troy 0-2, J Coughlan 0-1, D O'Riordan 0-1, D Herlihy 0-1.

10 June 1989 First round	Inniscarra	1-10 - 3-09	Mallow	Blarney
	G Manley 0-5, S Griffin 1-1, M O'Donoghue 0-3, P O'Connell 0-1.		J Walsh 1-5, T Coakley 2-0, R Glynn 0-2, R Sheehan 0-1, J Hayes 0-1.

10 June 1989 First round replay	Bishopstown	2-15 - 4-12	Cloyne	Páirc Shéamuis de Barra
	T Keating 2-0, A O'Sullivan 0-6, B O'Shea 0-3, G McCarthy 0-2, C Coffey 0-2, F O'Regan 0-1.		M Lynch 2-4, P Cahill 1-4, G Lewis 1-2, J Lewis 0-1, P O'Shea 0-1.

11 June 1989 First round replay	Douglas	3-04 - 0-15	Tracton	Carrigaline
	P Walsh 0-4, T Hurley 1-0, E Forde 1-0, P Lynch 1-0.		B Long 0-4, L Kelly 0-2, J O'Callaghan 0-2, K Kingston 0-2, J Kingston 0-1, M Quinn 0-1, P Harrington 0-1, DJ Kiely 0-1.

=== Second round ===
27 May 1989 Second round	Ballinhassig	2-15 - 3-08	Glen Rovers	Ted Hanley Memorial Park
	S McCarthy 0-11, D Lombard 1-2, M Murphy 1-0, C Cottrell 0-1, D McCarthy 0-1.		D Geaney 1-4, P O'Neill 1-1, P Burke 1-0, K McGrath 0-2, P Barry 0-1.

28 May 1989 Second round	Valley Rovers	3-14 - 2-06	St. Vincent's	Ballinora
	B O'Sullivan 1-2, J Shiels 0-5, D Kiely 1-1, C O'Donovan 1-1, A Crowley 0-2, TJ Deasy 0-1, P O'Sullivan 0-1, M Cronin 0-1.		J Hayes 1-0, M O'Neill 1-0, G Maguire 0-3, D Murphy 0-2, L Harte 0-1.

10 June 1989 Second round	Ballymartle	2-12 - 2-10	Delanys	Páirc Liam Mhic Cárthaigh
	J O'Mahony 0-5, K McCarthy 1-1, M Fitzpatrick 0-4, P Dorney 1-0, M Allen 0-1, J McCarthy 0-1.		M McElhinney 1-2, P Dolan 0-4, J Kelleher 1-0, L Foley 0-1, G Healy 0-1, T Callinan 0-1, P O'Connell 0-1.

17 June 1989 Second round	Youghal	2-12 - 0-08	Cobh	St. Catherine's Park
	M Butler 2-0, T Coyne 0-4, S Ring 0-4, V Murray 0-2, K Lonergan 0-1, T O'Connell 0-1.		G Morgan 0-6, S Looney 0-1, M Daly 0-1.

17 June 1989 Second round	Newtownshandrum	5-07 - 3-13	Kilbrittain	Blarney
	D Coughlan 4-1, R Trooy 1-0, D Herlihy 0-2, D O'Connor 0-1, J O'Mahony 0-1, G Morrissey 0-1, J Lenihan 0-1.		D O'Connell 1-2, D O'Neill 0-5, J O'Sullivan 1-1, P Hunt 1-0, G O'Connell 0-2, T Brennan 0-2, F Sheehy 0-1.

1 July 1989 Second round	Tracton	1-13 - 1-08	Cloyne	Church Road
	DJ Kiely 0-9, A Kiely 1-0, L Kelly 0-1, K Kingston 0-1, J O'Callaghan 0-1, M Quinn 0-1.		M Lynch 0-4, T O'Sullivan 1-0, P Cahill 0-1, P O'Shea 0-1, G Lewis 0-1, J Lewis 0-1.

1 July 1989 Second round replay	Newtownshandrum	2-08 - 3-11	Kilbrittain	Blarney
	D Coughlan 1-2, G Morrissey 1-0, B O'Connor 0-2, J Coughlan 0-1, J O'Mahony 0-1, D Herlihy 0-1, R Troy 0-1.		D O'Connell 1-5, F Sheehy 2-1, C O'Connell 0-3, J O'Connell 0-1, D O'Neill 0-1.

6 August 1989 Second round	Mallow	2-16 - 2-05	St. Catherine's	Moore Park
	J Walsh 0-8, R Sheehan 1-0, J Hayes 1-0, T Coakley 0-3, J Bucklkey 0-2, R Glynn 0-2, D O'Connell 0-1.		C Clancy 1-2, J Mangan 1-0, C Casey 0-2, D O'Leary 0-1.

21 August 1989 Second round	Blackrock	2-04 - 0-12	Cloughduv	Ovens
	D Collins 1-1, T Deasy 1-0, P Moylan 0-3.		B McSweeney 0-5 T Barry-Murphy 0-3, J Grainger 0-2, J Moynihan 0-1, P Murray 0-1.

=== Quarter-finals ===
16 July 1989 Quarter-final	Cloughduv	0-11 - 0-11	Ballinhassig	Innishannon Sportsfield
	D O'Leary 0-4, T Barry-Murphy 0-3, J Grainger 0-2, P Barry-Murphy 0-1, T Dunne 0-1.		S McCarthy 0-8, D McCarthy 0-1, D Coleman 0-1, P Fleming 0-1.

16 July 1989 Quarter-final	Youghal	3-07 - 1-13	Tracton	Erin's Own Grounds
	S Ring 2-0, T Coyne 1-2, V Murray 0-4, D Byrne 0-1.		K Kingston 0-5, DJ Kiely 0-4, J Collins 1-0, B Long 0-2, T O'Callaghan 0-1, A Kiely 0-1.

16 July 1989 Quarter-final	Valley Rovers	1-10 - 1-09	Ballymartle	Ballinhassig
	J Shiels 0-6, D Kiely 1-2, C O'Donovan 0-1, T O'Sullivan 0-1.		M Fitzpatrick 0-6, G McCarthy 1-0, J O'Mahony 0-2, J McCarthy 0-1.

30 July 1989 Quarter-final replay	Cloughduv	3-13 - 0-11	Ballinhassig	Innishannon Sportsfield
	T Barry-Murphy 3-1, J Grainger 0-7, D Lynch 0-3, C Barry-Murphy 0-1, D Ring 0-1.		S McCarthy 0-7, P Fleming 0-1, D Coleman 0-1, C Cottrell 0-1, J O'Mahony 0-1.

5 August 1989 Quarter-final replay	Youghal	4-09 - 2-08	Tracton	Erin's Own Grounds
	T Coyne 2-3, M Butler 2-1, S Ring 0-2, R Byrne 0-1, T O'Connell 0-1, V Murray 0-1.		DJ Kiely 1-1, J O'Callaghan 1-0, M Quinn 0-2, B Long 0-2, K Kingston 0-2, J Kingston 0-1.

10 September 1989 Quarter-final	Kilbrittain	4-12 - 3-14	Mallow	Coachford Sportsfield
	D O'Connell 3-3, D Healy 0-6, T McCarthy 0-1, T Brennan 0-1, G O'Connell 0-1.		J Daly 1-3, R Sheehan 0-6, D O'Donnell 1-1, R Glynn 1-0, J Buckley 0-1, J Walsh 0-1, T Coakley 0-1, E Carey 0-1.

=== Semi-finals ===
19 August 1989 Semi-final	Valley Rovers	3-10 - 1-09	Cloughduv	Ballincollig
	J Shields 1-5, J Crowley 1-1, A Crowley 1-0, D Kiely 0-2, G Burke 0-1, M Cronin 0-1.		K Murray 1-2, T Barry-Murphy 0-4, B McSweeney 0-1, J Grainger 0-1, L Lynch 0-1.

24 September 1989 Semi-final	Kilbrittain	5-10 - 1-08	Youghal	Páirc Uí Chaoimh
	D Healy 2-2, C O'Connell 2-2, J O'Connell 1-0, J McCarthy 0-2, T Sheehan 0-2, D O'Neill 0-1, D O'Connell 0-1.		T Coyne 0-5, M Butler 1-0, G Cotter 0-1, R Byrne 0-1, T O'Connell 0-1.

=== Final ===
1 October 1989 Final	Valley Rovers	6-12 - 3-05	Kilbrittain	Páirc Uí Chaoimh
	J Shiels 2-6, E Burke 2-0, C O'Donovan 1-3, J Crowley 1-0, A Crowley 0-1, D Kiely 0-1, P O'Sullivan 0-1.		C O'Connell 2-0, T McCarthy 1-0, T Brennan 0-2, D Healy 0-1, D O'Neill 0-1, D O'Connell 0-1.

== Championship statistics ==
=== Top scorers ===
Overall

Rank	Player	Club	Tally	Total	Matches	Average
1	John Shiels	Valley Rovers	3-22	31	4	7.75
2	Dan O'Connell	Kilbrittain	5-12	27	5	5.40
3	Seánie McCarthy	Ballinhassig	0-26	26	3	8.66
4	Tony Coyne	Youghal	3-17	26	5	5.20
5	Mick Butler	Youghal	7-02	23	5	4.60
6	Donal Coughlan	Newtownshandrum	5-07	22	3	7.33
6	D. J. Kiely	Tracton	1-19	22	5	4.40
8	Tom Brennan	Kilbrittain	0-20	20	5	4.00
8	Tim Barry-Murphy	Cloughduv	3-11	20	4	5.00
10	Maurice Lynch	Cloyne	3-10	19	3	6.33

In a single game

Rank	Player	Club	Tally	Total	Opposition
1	Tom Brennan	Kilbrittain	0-15	15	Mayfield
2	Donal Coughlan	Newtownshandrum	4-01	13	Kilbrittain
3	Dan O'Connell	Kilbrittain	3-03	12	Mallow
3	John Shiels	Valley Rovers	2-06	12	Kilbrittain
5	Seánie McCarthy	Ballinhassig	0-11	11	Glen Rovers
6	Tim Barry-Murphy	Cloughduv	3-01	10	Ballinhassig
6	Maurice Lynch	Cloyne	2-04	10	Bishopstown
8	Tony Coyne	Youghal	2-03	9	Tracton
8	D. J. Kiely	Tracton	0-09	9	Youghal
