= Dan O'Connell (hurler) =

Irish hurler

Personal information
- Native name: Dónall Ó Conaill (Irish)
- Born: 1968 (age 57–58) Kilbrittain, County Cork, Ireland
- Occupation: ESB employee

Sport
- Sport: Hurling
- Position: Full-forward
Clubs
Years	Club	Apps (scores)
1985-2008 1989-1994; 2000-2001	Kilbrittain → Carbery	67 (32-243); 24 (11-30)
Club titles
- Cork titles: 1
Inter-county*
Years	County	Apps (scores)
1988; 1995-1996	Cork	0 (0-00)
Inter-county titles
- Munster titles: 0
- All-Irelands: 0
- NHL: 0
- All Stars: 0
- *Inter County team apps and scores correct as of 15:11, 18 April 2022.

Daniel O'Connell (born 1968) is an Irish former hurler who played for club side Kilbrittain, divisional team Carbery and at inter-county level with the Cork senior hurling team. He usually lined out in the full-forward line.

== Career ==
O'Connell first played hurling at juvenile and underage levels with the Kilbrittain club. He also lined out as a schoolboy with St. Finbarr's College and was a substitute on their Harty Cup and All-Ireland-winning team in 1984. O'Connell was just 16-years-old when he joined Kilbrittain's adult team and was a member of their Cork JAHC title-winning team in 1985. A decade later, he captained the team to the Cork IHC title after winning a Cork SHC title with Carbery the previous year.

O'Connell first appeared on the inter-county scene as a non-playing substitute on the Cork minor hurling team that won the All-Ireland MHC title in 1985. He later won an All-Ireland U21HC title with the under-21 team. O'Connell was drafted onto the Cork senior hurling team during the early stage of the 1988-89 National League. He subsequently joined the junior team and won an All-Ireland medal in that grade in 1994. O'Connell was recalled to the Cork senior team for the 1995-96 National League.

== Career statistics ==
=== Club ===
Team	Year	Cork JAHC	
Team	Year	Apps	Score
Kilbrittain	1985	2	0-00
Kilbrittain	Total	3	2-17
Kilbrittain	Year	Cork IHC	
Kilbrittain	Year	Apps	Score
Kilbrittain	1986	1	0-00
Kilbrittain	1987	1	1-03
Kilbrittain	1988	4	2-11
Kilbrittain	1989	5	5-12
Kilbrittain	1990	2	1-06
Kilbrittain	1991	2	1-05
Kilbrittain	1992	3	0-10
Kilbrittain	1993	4	2-09
Kilbrittain	1994	2	0-12
Kilbrittain	1995	5	4-20
Kilbrittain	Total	29	16-88
Kilbrittain	Year	Cork SHC	
Kilbrittain	Year	Apps	Score
Kilbrittain	1996	5	6-21
Kilbrittain	1997	2	1-07
Kilbrittain	1998	1	1-03
Kilbrittain	1999	1	0-01
Kilbrittain	Total	9	8-32
Kilbrittain	Year	Cork IHC	
Kilbrittain	Year	Apps	Score
Kilbrittain	2000	4	2-24
Kilbrittain	2001	2	1-05
Kilbrittain	2002	3	0-18
Kilbrittain	2003	3	0-10
Kilbrittain	2004	0	0-00
Kilbrittain	2005	6	1-17
Kilbrittain	2006	2	1-14
Kilbrittain	2007	4	1-15
Kilbrittain	2008	2	0-03
Kilbrittain	Total	26	6-106
Career total		67	32-243

== Honours ==
St. Finbarr's College

- All-Ireland Colleges Senior Hurling Championship: 1984
- Munster Colleges Senior Hurling Championship : 1984

Kilbrittain

- Cork Intermediate Hurling Championship: 1995 (c)
- Cork Junior A Hurling Championship: 1985

Carbery

- Cork Senior Hurling Championship: 1994

Cork

- All-Ireland Junior Hurling Championship: 1994
- Munster Junior Hurling Championship: 1992, 1994, 1996
- All-Ireland Under-21 Hurling Championship: 1988
- Munster Under-21 Hurling Championship: 1988
- All-Ireland Minor Hurling Championship: 1985
- Munster Minor Hurling Championship: 1985, 1986
