= 1992 Cork Junior A Hurling Championship =

- Dates: 27 September - 1 November 1992
- Teams: 7
- Champions: Newcestown (3rd title); Eugene Desmond (captain)
- Runners-up: Newtownshandrum; Jim Coughlan (captain)

Tournament statistics
- Matches played: 7
- Goals scored: 19 (2.71 per match)
- Points scored: 142 (20.29 per match)
- Top scorer(s): Pat Kenneally (1-16)

The 1992 Cork Junior A Hurling Championship was the 95th staging of the Cork Junior A Hurling Championship since its establishment by the Cork County Board. The draw for the opening fixtures took place on 15 December 1991. The championship ran from 27 September to 1 November 1992.

The final was played on 1 November 1992 at Páirc Uí Chaoimh in Cork between Newcestown and Newtownshandrum, in what was their first ever meeting in the final. Newcestown won the match by 2-14 to 3-05 to claim their third championship title overall and a first title in 12 years.

Newcestown's Pat Kenneally was the championship's top scorer with 1-16.

== Qualification ==
Division	Championship	Champions
Avondhu	North Cork Junior A Hurling Championship	Newtownshandrum
Carbery	South West Junior A Hurling Championship	Newcestown
Carrigdhoun	South East Junior A Hurling Championship	Ballinhassig
Duhallow	Duhallow Junior A Hurling Championship	Kilbrin
Imokilly	East Cork Junior A Hurling Championship	Aghada
Muskerry	Mid Cork Junior A Hurling Championship	Blarney
Seandún	City Junior A Hurling Championship	Glen Rovers

== Results ==
=== Quarter-finals ===
27 September 1992 Quarter-final	Glen Rovers	0-10 - 1-07	Kilbrin	Mallow Grounds
	P Bracken 0-4, S McGrath 0-2, D Geaney 0-2, F Wall 0-1, M Tierney 0-1.		D O'Sullivan 1-1, J Sheehan 0-2, J O'Donoghue 0-2, J O'Reilly 0-1, M Sheehan 0-1.

4 October 1992 Quarter-final	Newcestown	1-11 - 0-10	Aghada	Riverstown Sportsfield
	E Kenneally 1-2, P Kenneally 0-3, P Condon 0-2, D Wilson 0-2, P Crowley 0-1, E Desmond 0-1.		R Lewis 0-5, D Devoy 0-2, P Cashman 0-1, R Dwane 0-1, D Morrissey 0-1.

4 October 1992 Quarter-final replay	Glen Rovers	2-11 - 0-10	Kilbrin	Mallow Grounds
	G Geaney 2-3, P Power 0-3, D Geaney 0-2, F Wall 0-1, P Bracken 0-1, A Mulcahy 0-1.		D O'Sullivan 0-5, J Sheehan 0-2, D Sheehan 0-1, P Field 0-1, I O'Sullivan 0-1.

18 October 1992 Quarter-final	Ballinhassig	2-12 - 1-08	Blarney	Ballincollig Grounds
	S McCarthy 0-7, D Lombard 1-1, J Aherne 1-1, Damien McCarthy 0-2, Denis McCarthy 0-1.		B Sheehan 1-1, A Murphy 0-3, T Harrington 0-2, D Mullane 0-1, R O'Sullivan 0-1.

- Newtownshandrum received a bye in this round.

=== Semi-finals ===
18 October 1992 Semi-final	Newtownshandrum	2-15 - 2-07	Glen Rovers	Castletownroche Grounds
	J Coughlan 0-8, D O'Riordan 1-2, D Coughlan 1-0, J Ryan 0-2, J Geary 0-1, J Lenihan 0-1, M Reidy 0-1.		P Power 1-1, D Geaney 1-0, P Bracken 0-3, C O'Halloran 0-1.

25 October 1992 Semi-final	Newcestown	2-14 - 1-08	Ballinhassig	Ballincollig Grounds
	E Desmond 2-0, P Kenneally 0-4, E Kenneally 0-3, P Condon 0-3, J O'Sullivan 0-2, K Long 0-1, B White 0-1.		Damien McCarthy 1-1, S McCarthy 0-3, D Lombard 0-1, Denis McCarthy 0-1, P Fleming 0-1, K Cullinane 0-1.

=== Final ===
1 November 1992 Final	Newcestown	2-14 - 3-05	Newtownshandrum	Páirc Uí Chaoimh
	P Kenneally 1-9, K Long 1-1, E Kenneally 0-2, E Desmond 0-1, P Crowley 0-1.		G Morrissey 2-1, D O'Riordan 1-1, J Coughlan 0-2, M Reidy 0-1.	Referee: M O'Flaherty (Blackrock)

== Championship statistics ==
=== Top scorers ===
Overall

Rank	Player	Club	Tally	Total	Matches	Average
1	Pat Kenneally	Newcestown	1-16	19	3	6.33
2	Eddie Kenneally	Newcestown	1-07	10	3	3.33
2	Jim Coughlan	Newtownshandrum	0-10	10	3	3.33
2	Seán McCarthy	Ballinhassig	0-10	10	2	5.00
5	Dan Riordan	Newtownshandrum	2-03	9	3	3.00
5	Gary Geaney	Glen Rovers	2-03	9	3	3.00
5	Dan O'Sullivan	Kilbrin	1-06	9	2	4.50

In a single game

Rank	Player	Club	Tally	Total	Opposition
1	Pat Kenneally	Newcestown	1-09	12	Newtownshandrum
2	Gary Geaney	Glen Rovers	2-03	9	Aghada
3	Jim Coughlan	Newtownshandrum	0-08	8	Glen Rovers
4	Gerard Morrissey	Newtownshandrum	2-01	7	Newcestown
4	Seán McCarthy	Ballinhassig	0-07	7	Blarney
6	Eugene Desmond	Newcestown	2-00	6	Ballinhassig
7	Eddie Kenneally	Newcestown	1-02	5	Aghada
7	Dan Riordan	Newtownshandrum	1-02	5	Glen Rovers
7	Richie Lewis	Aghada	0-05	5	Newcestown
7	Dan O'Sullivan	Kilbrin	0-05	5	Glen Rovers
