= Mickey Mullins =

Irish hurler and Gaelic footballer

Personal information
- Native name: Mícheál Ó Maoláin (Irish)
- Nickname: Mickey
- Born: 14 August 1968 (age 58) Farranree, Cork, Ireland
- Occupation: Sales representative
- Height: 5 ft 8 in (173 cm)

Sport
- Sport: Hurling
- Position: Right wing-forward
Club
- Years: Club
- Na Piarsaigh
Club titles
- Cork titles: 2
Inter-county*
Years	County	Apps (scores)
1987–1990	Cork	9 (1–8)
Inter-county titles
- Munster titles: 0
- All-Irelands: 0
- NHL: 0
- All Stars: 0
- *Inter County team apps and scores correct as of 20:21, 29 July 2015.

Michael Mullins (born 1968) is an Irish retired hurler who played as a right wing-forward for the Cork senior hurling team.

Born in Farranree, Cork, Mullins first arrived on the inter-county scene at the age of seventeen when he first linked up with the Cork minor teams as a dual player before later joining the under-21 sides. He made his senior hurling debut during the 1987 championship. Mullins immediately became a regular member of the starting fifteen and won one All-Ireland medal as a non-playing substitute.

As a member of the Munster inter-provincial team on a number of occasions, Mullins never won one Railway Cup medal on the field of play. At club level he is a two-time championship medallist with Na Piarsaigh.

Throughout his career Mullins made 9 championship appearances. His retirement came following the conclusion of the 1990 championship.

== Playing career ==
=== Club ===
After enjoying championship success in the under-21 grade with Na Piarsaigh, Mullins quickly joined the senior team. After losing the 1987 championship decider to Midleton, the club qualified for the final again in 1990. Southside kingpins St. Finbarr's provided the opposition, however, the game ended level. The replay was also a close affair, however, a narrow 2–7 to 1–8 victory gave Mullins a Cork Senior Hurling Championship medal.

Na Piarsaigh failed to retain their title, while the club also faced defeat at the hands of Erin's Own in 1992. Three years later Mullins lined out in a fourth championship decider as North Cork minnows Ballyhea provided the opposition. A 1–12 to 3–1 victory gave Mullins a second championship medal.

=== Minor and under-21 ===
Mullins first played for Cork as a member of the minor hurling team on 16 May 1985 in a 1–12 to 1–8 Munster semi-final defeat of Limerick. A subsequent 1–13 to 1–8 defeat of Tipperary secured a centenary year Munster medal for Mullins. Wexford provided the opposition in the subsequent All-Ireland decider on 1 September 1985. Mullins scored a point and collected an All-Ireland Minor Hurling Championship medal following a 3–10 to 0–12 victory.

As he was still eligible for the minor grade again in 1986, Mullins won a second consecutive Munster medal following a 2–11 to 1–11 defeat of Tipperary in a replay. On 7 September 1986 Cork faced breakthrough team Offaly in the All-Ireland final. Mullins top scored with 1–5, however, Cork were hampered by having one of their players dismissed and succumbed to a 3–12 to 3–9 defeat.

Mullins was also added to the Cork minor football team in 1986. A 2–12 to 0–4 trouncing of Kerry, with Mullins scoring 1–1, gave him a Munster medal in that code. On 21 September 1986 Cork faced Galway in the All-Ireland decider. The westerners proved a marginally better outfit and Cork were defeated by 3–8 to 2–7.

By 1988 Mullins was added to the Cork under-21 hurling team. He won a Munster medal that year following a 4–12 to 1–7 defeat of Limerick.

After making his debut with the Cork under-21 football team as a minor in 1986, Mullins was a regular on the starting fifteen by 1989. He added a Munster medal in that code to his collection that year following a 3–15 to 1–7 defeat of Clare. On 21 May 1989 Cork faced Galway in the All-Ireland final. In his last game in the grade Mullins scored 1–5 from centre-forward and secured an All-Ireland medal following a narrow 2–8 to 1–10 victory.

=== Senior ===
Mullins made his senior hurling championship debut for Cork on 14 June 1987 when he was introduced as a substitute in a 3–11 apiece Munster quarter-final draw with Limerick. He quickly became a regular member of the starting fifteen.

In 1990 Cork bounced back after a period in decline. Mullins started Cork's opening championship game but was dropped from the starting fifteen for all subsequent games. In spite of this he won a Munster medal as a non-playing substitute following a 4–16 to 2–14 defeat of Tipperary. The subsequent All-Ireland final on 2 September 1990 pitted Cork against Galway for the second time in four years. Galway were once again the red-hot favourites and justified this tag by going seven points ahead in the opening thirty-five minutes thanks to a masterful display by Joe Cooney. Cork fought back with an equally expert display by captain Tomás Mulcahy. The game was effectively decided on an incident which occurred midway through the second half when Cork goalkeeper Ger Cunningham blocked a point-blank shot from Martin Naughton with his nose. The umpires gave no 65-metre free, even though he clearly deflected it out wide. Cork went on to win a high-scoring and open game of hurling by 5–15 to 2–21. In spite of not playing any part in the game Mullins collected an All-Ireland medal as a non-playing substitute.

Two years later in 1992 Mullins joined the Cork junior team. He won a Munster medal in this grade that year following a 1–12 to 1–10 defeat of Clare. On 16 August 1992 Cork faced Wexford in the All-Ireland decider. An exciting game developed, however, the sides finished level at the full-time whistle. The replay on 30 August 1992 saw Mullins included on the starting fifteen after starting the drawn game on the bench. Cork started well but Wexford built up a six-point interval lead. Cork had the benefit of playing with the wind in the second half, however, they were defeated by 0–13 to 1–8.

== Honours ==
=== Player ===
Na Piarsaigh

- Cork Senior Hurling Championship (2): 1990, 1995

Cork

- All-Ireland Senior Hurling Championship (1): 1990 (sub)
- Munster Senior Hurling Championship (1): 1990 (sub)
- Munster Junior Hurling Championship (1): 1992
- All-Ireland Under-21 Football Championship (1): 1989
- Munster Under-21 Football Championship (1): 1989
- Munster Under-21 Hurling Championship (1): 1988
- All-Ireland Minor Hurling Championship (1): 1985
- Munster Minor Hurling Championship (2): 1985, 1986
- Munster Minor Football Championship (1): 1986
