= Barry Egan (hurler) =

Irish hurler

Personal information
- Native name: Barra Mac Aogáin (Irish)
- Born: 18 August 1972 (age 54) Cork, Ireland
- Occupation: Computer Specialist
- Height: 5 ft 8 in (173 cm)

Sport
- Sport: Hurling
- Position: Right wing-forward
Club
- Years: Club
- 1990-2006: Delaney Rovers
Club titles
- Cork titles: 0
Inter-county*
| Years | County | Apps (scores) |
| 1992-1998 | Cork | 10 (0-25) |
Inter-county titles
- Munster titles: 1
- All-Irelands: 0
- NHL: 2
- All Stars: 1
- *Inter County team apps and scores correct as of 17:26, 6 August 2014.

Barry Egan (born 18 August 1972) is an Irish retired hurler who played as a right wing-forward for the Cork senior team.

Born in Cork, Egan first played competitive hurling during his schooling at the North Monastery. He arrived on the inter-county scene at the age of seventeen when he first linked up with the Cork minor teams as a dual player, before later joining the under-21 sides. He made his senior debut during the 1991-92 National Hurling League. Egan went on to play a key role for Cork, and won one Munster medal and two National Hurling League games.

As a member of the Munster inter-provincial team on a number of occasions, Egan won one Railway Cup medal. At club level he is a one-time championship medallist with Delaney Rovers in the intermediate grade.

Throughout his career Egan made ten championship appearances for Cork. He was dropped from the Cork panel after the conclusion of the 1998 championship.

== Playing career ==
=== Inter-county ===
Egan was first picked for the Cork minor hurling team in 1990. He won a Munster medal that year following a 1-9 to 0-9 defeat of Clare. Cork later faced Kilkenny in the All-Ireland decider, however, both sides finished level at 3-14 apiece. In the replay Kilkenny proved too strong as Cork faced a heavy 3-16 to 0-11 defeat.

The following year Egan was called up to the Cork under-21 hurling team. He won a Munster medal that year as Cork defeated Limerick by 0-17 to 1-7.

Egan added a second Munster under-21 medal to his collection in 1993 following another 1-18 to 3-9 defeat of Limerick. Once again All-Ireland success eluded the team.

On 24 May 1992 Egan made his senior hurling championship debut in a 0-22 to 0-8 Munster quarter-final defeat of Kerry. He later won his only Munster medal following a 1-22 to 3-11 defeat of Limerick in the provincial decider. Egan later missed Cork's 3-10 to 1-12 All-Ireland final defeat by Kilkenny.

Egan won his first National Hurling League medal following a marathon three-game saga with Wexford in 1993. In spite of falling short in the championship, Egan won an All-Star at the end of the year.

In 1998 Egan won his second National Hurling League medal following a 2-14 to 0-13 defeat of Waterford.

== Honours ==
=== Team ===
North Monastery

- Frewen Cup (1): 1989

Delaney Rovers

- Cork Intermediate Hurling Championship (1): 2002

Cork

- Munster Senior Hurling Championship (1): 1992
- National Hurling League (2): 1992-93, 1998
- Munster Under-21 Hurling Championship (2): 1991, 1993
- Munster Minor Hurling Championship (1): 1990

Munster

- Railway Cup (1): 1995

=== Individual ===
Awards

- All-Star (3): 1993
