= 1986 All-Ireland Minor Hurling Championship =

All-Ireland Minor Hurling Championship 1986
Championship Details
- Dates: 7 May 1986 – 7 September 1986

All Ireland Champions
- Winners: Offaly (1st win)
- Captain: Michael Hogan

All Ireland Runners-up
- Runners-up: Cork
- Captain: Kieran Keane

Provincial Champions
- Munster: Cork
- Leinster: Offaly
- Ulster: Antrim
- Connacht: Not Played

Championship Statistics
- Top Scorer: Dan O'Connell (9-02)

The 1986 All-Ireland Minor Hurling Championship was the 56th staging of the All-Ireland Minor Hurling Championship since its establishment by the Gaelic Athletic Association in 1928. The championship began on 7 May 1986 and ended on 7 September 1986.

Cork entered the championship as the defending champions.

On 7 September 1986, Offaly won the championship following a 3-12 to 3-9 defeat of Cork in the All-Ireland final. This was their first ever All-Ireland title.

Cork's Dan O'Connell was the championship's top scorer with 9-02.

== Results ==
=== Leinster Minor Hurling Championship ===
First round

24 May 1986 First round	Wexford	3-13 - 1-03	Carlow	Nowlan Park, Kilkenny
			L Ahern 1-0, M Mullins 0-3.

24 May 1986 First round	Offaly	2-08 - 2-08	Kilkenny	O'Moore Park, Portlaoise
	R Byrne 1-4, D Pilkington 1-1, G Cahill 0-1, A Kelly 0-1, B Dooley 0-1.		J Brennan 1-3, J Lawless 1-1, J Walton 0-2, P Hoban 0-2.	Referee: M Delaney (Laois)

31 May 1986 First round replay	Offaly	3-09 - 4-05	Kilkenny	O'Moore Park, Portlaoise
	R Byrne 0-5, D Regan 1-0, B Dooley 1-0, D Pilkington 1-0, G Cahill 0-3, A Kelly 0-1.		A Ronan 2-1, T Murphy 2-0, J Walton 0-1, J Brennan 0-1, L Dowling 0-1, J Lawlor 0-1.	Referee: P Delaney (Laois)

Semi-finals

28 June 1986 Semi-final	Wexford	3-15 - 3-06	Laois	Dr. Cullen Park, Carlow
			N Delaney 1-2, G Norton 1-0, M O'Gorman 1-0, J Fitzpatrick 0-2, C Duggan 0-1, J Lawlor 0-1.

2 July 1986 Semi-final	Offaly	2-10 - 0-07	Dublin	O'Moore Park, Portlaoise
	D Pilkington 2-1, A Kelly 0-2, D Regan 0-2, C Byrne 0-1, J Gilmartin 0-1, D Geoghegan 0-1, M Duignan 0-1, G Cahill 0-1.		J Flanagan 0-4, P Smith 0-2, N Murphy 0-1.

Final

13 July 1986 Final	Offaly	4-07 - 1-05	Wexford	Croke Park, Dublin
	R Byrne 2-0, T Moylan 1-1, B Dooley 1-0, G Cahill 0-2, D Pilkington 0-2, M Hogan 0-2.		N Jordan 1-0, L Dunne 0-3, G Kearns 0-1, J O'Connor 0-1.	Referee: J Henry (Westmeath)

=== Munster Minor Hurling Championship ===
First round

7 May 1986 First round	Waterford	w/o - scr.	Kerry	Fraher Field, Dungarvan

7 May 1986 First round	Clare	2-11 - 0-13	Limerick	Cusack Park, Ennis
	T Kenny 0-6, T Moynihan 1-2, P Guinnane 1-1, N Haran 0-2.		M Galligan 0-11, M Houlihan 0-1, M Browne 0-1.

Semi-finals

22 May 1986 Semi-final	Waterford	0-08 - 4-11	Cork	Fraher Field, Dungarvan
	L Hartley 0-5, B Brophy 0-2, B Sullivan 0-1.		D O'Connell 2-0, J Corcoran 0-4, J Walsh 1-0, B Cunningham 1-0, R Sheehan 0-3, M Mullins 0-3, J O'Mahony 0-1.

4 July 1986 Semi-final	Tipperary	3-14 - 0-03	Clare	Gaelic Grounds, Limerick
	M Nolan 1-6, D Quirke 1-1, C Stakelum 1-0, T Lanigan 0-2, L Cleary 0-2, D Ryan 0-1, P Hogan 0-1, C Egan 0-1.		M McNamara 0-2, T Kennedy 0-1.

Finals

20 July 1986 Final	Cork	3-10 - 2-13	Tipperary	FitzGerald Stadium, Thurles
	M Mullins 1-3, J Corcoran 1-2, D O'Connell 1-0, J Walsh 0-3, J O'Mahony 0-1, B Cunningham 0-1.		M Nolan 0-9, C Egan 1-1, D Quirke 1-0, T Lanigan 0-2, C Stakelum 0-1.	Referee: K Walsh (Limerick)

31 July 1986 Final replay	Cork	2-11 - 1-11	Tipperary	FitzGerald Park, Kilmallock
	M Mullins 0-5, R Sheehan 1-0, D O'Connell 1-0, J Corcoran 0-3, B Cunningham 0-1, J Walsh 0-1, T O'Keeffe 0-1.		M Nolan 0-7, C Egan 1-0, A Lanigan 0-2, C Bonnar 0-1, D Ryan 0-1.

=== Ulster Minor Hurling Championship ===
Final

6 July 1986 Final	Derry	1-10 - 2-09	Antrim	Kevin Lynch Park, Dungiven
	P Healy 1-6, M Cassidy 0-2, M McGonagle 0-1, M McAleese 0-1.		D McKillop 1-6, J Carson 1-1, M McShane 0-1, S McMullan 0-1.

=== All-Ireland Minor Hurling Championship ===
Semi-finals

10 August 1986 Semi-final	Offaly	3-13 - 2-10	Galway	Semple Stadium, Thurles
	M Duignan 1-5, T Moylan 1-3, D Regan 1-2, G Cahill 0-3.		R Duane 1-4, N Turley 1-1, Pat Kelly 0-2, E Dervan 0-1, B Uniacke 0-1, Pádraig Kelly 0-1.	Referee: G Long (Tipperary)

10 August 1986 Semi-final	Cork	4-17 - 1-05	Antrim	Croke Park, Dublin
	D O'Connell 4-1, J Corcoran 0-4, M Mullins 0-4, J Walsh 0-2, B Cunningham 0-2, D Walsh 0-1, P Kenneally 0-1, R Sheehan 0-1, G Manley 0-1.		C Murphy 1-1, S McIlhatton 0-2, D McKinley 0-1, D McKillop 0-1.

Final

7 September 1986 Final	Offaly	3-12 - 3-09	Cork	Croke Park, Dublin
	D Pilkington 2-2, D Regan 1-1, G Cahill 0-2, M Duignan 0-2, P Nallen 0-1, J Kilmartin 0-1, B Kelly 0-1, T Moylan 0-1, R Byrne 0-1.		M Mullins 1-5, D O'Connell 1-1, J Corcoran 1-0, P Kenneally 0-1, J O'Mahony 0-1, R Sheehan 0-1.	Referee: J Moore (Waterford)

== Championship statistics ==
=== Top scorers ===
Rank	Player	Club	Tally	Total	Matches	Average
1	Dan O'Connell	Cork	9-02	29	5	5.80
2	Mickey Mullins	Cork	2-20	26	5	5.20
3	Michael Nolan	Tipperary	1-22	25	3	8.33
4	Declan Pilkington	Offaly	6-06	24	6	4.00
5	Ronald Byrne	Offaly	3-10	19	6	3.16
5	John Corcoran	Cork	2-13	19	5	3.80

=== Miscellaneous ===
- Offaly won the Leinster Championship for the first time in their history before going on to claim their inaugural All-Ireland Championship.
