= Tony Coyne =

Irish hurler

Personal information
- Native name: Antaine Ó Cadhain (Irish)
- Born: 1963 (age 62–63) Youghal, County Cork, Ireland

Sport
- Sport: Hurling
- Position: Centre-forward
Clubs
Years	Club	Apps (scores)
1979-1999 1989	Youghal → Imokilly	22 (14-76); 2 (1-04)
Club titles
- Cork titles: 0
Inter-county*
Years	County	Apps (scores)
1980-1983	Cork	0 (0-00)
Inter-county titles
- Munster titles: 1
- All-Irelands: 0
- NHL: 0
- All Stars: 0
- *Inter County team apps and scores correct as of 22:14, 15 March 2021.

Anthony Coyne (born 1963) is an Irish hurling manager and retired player who lined out as a forward for club side Youghal, divisional side Imokilly and was a member of the Cork senior hurling team from 1980 until 1983.

== Honours ==
Youghal

- Cork Intermediate Hurling Championship: 1988, 1993 (c)

Cork

- Munster Senior Hurling Championship: 1983
- All-Ireland Under-21 Hurling Championship: 1982
- Munster Under-21 Hurling Championship: 1982
- All-Ireland Minor Hurling Championship: 1979
- Munster Minor Hurling Championship: 1979
