= Pat Kenneally =

Irish hurler

Personal information
- Born: 1968 (age 57–58) Newcestown, County Cork, Ireland
- Occupation: Secondary school teacher
- Height: 6 ft 1 in (185 cm)

Sport
- Sport: Hurling
- Position: Centre back
Clubs
- Years: Club
- 1984–2009 1988–1998: Newcestown → Carbery
Club titles
- Cork titles: 4
College
- Years: College
- University College Cork
College titles
- Fitzgibbon titles: 3
Inter-county*
Years	County	Apps (scores)
1989–1995	Cork	(0-00)
Inter-county titles
- Munster titles: 1
- All-Irelands: 1
- NHL: 1
- All Stars: 0
- *Inter County team apps and scores correct as of 22:41, 15 October 2013.

Pat Kenneally (born 1968) is a former Irish sportsperson. He played hurling with his local club Newcestown and with the Cork senior inter-county teams in the 1990s. Kenneally captained Cork in 1995, after being first selected in 1989. He played in four County Finals for his club He also won the Man of the Match award when playing in the 1994 county success with his division Carbery which allowed him to achieve the honour of captaining his county in the 1995 Senior Hurling campaign.

His inter county career began as a Cork minor hurler in 1986. He went on to win all-Ireland medals in u21, Junior and Senior hurling as well as Junior football for Cork. He won an All-Ireland Junior Hurling Championship medal in 1994 and an All-Ireland Junior Football Championship medal in 1989 together with an All-Ireland Under-21 Hurling Championship medal in 1989. He was also a member of the 1990 senior hurling squad who together with the senior footballers achieved an historic double that year. In 1993 he won a National Hurling League medal with Cork after the epic three match saga with Wexford. His last medal was one in the Intermediate Football final of 2001 though he played hurling for some years after.

He attended Hamilton High School in Bandon. At third level he played both Sigerson Cup gaelic football and Fitzgibbon Cup hurling - winning 3 medals- with UCC He represented teams in London, Boston and Chicago. He had twice broken the same ankle by the age of 17 with recurring complications for years after. He was regarded a tough but fair competitor . He coached St. Brogans College in Bandon to an All-Ireland success in 2004.

After a few years away from the game at a high level (he played for the 3rds' of Newcestown in 2009 ) he was persuaded to coach Valley Rovers who had been without success for some years at that time. However they were to win 3 counties within 2 years (2 football, 1 hurling). In 2010 he was appointed as coach to the Cork Intermediate hurling team (2 years) and went on to manage both the Cork minor (2 years) and Cork U21 hurling teams.

== Honours ==
University College Cork

- Fitzgibbon Cup: 1987, 1988, 1990

Newcestown

- Cork Intermediate Football Championship: 2001
- Cork Junior A Football Championship: 1990
- Cork Junior A Hurling Championship: 1992
- South West Junior A Football Championship: 1988, 1990
- South West Junior A Hurling Championship: 1988, 1991, 1992

Carbery

- Cork Senior Hurling Championship: 1994

Cork

- All-Ireland Senior Hurling Championship: 1990
- Munster Senior Hurling Championship: 1990
- National Hurling League: 1992–93
- All-Ireland Junior Hurling Championship: 1994
- Munster Junior Hurling Championship: 1992, 1994
- All-Ireland Under-21 Hurling Championship: 1988
- Munster Under-21 Hurling Championship: 1988
- Munster Minor Hurling Championship: 1986

Sporting positions
Preceded by Ger Cunningham	Cork senior hurling team captain 1995	Succeeded by Mark Mullins
Preceded by Johnny Keane	Cork intermediate hurling team manager 2009-2011	Succeeded by Liam Hayes
Preceded by John Considine	Cork minor hurling team manager 2011-2013	Succeeded by Denis Ring
Preceded by Ger Fitzgerald	Cork under-21 hurling team manager 2013-2014	Succeeded by Damien Irwin
