= 1988 All-Ireland Under-21 Hurling Championship =

Irish national junior tournament in hurling

All-Ireland Under-21 Hurling Championship 1988
Championship Details
- Dates: 8 June 1988 - 11 September 1988

All Ireland Champions
- Winners: Cork (9th win)
- Captain: Christy Connery
- Manager: Joe McGrath

All Ireland Runners-up
- Runners-up: Kilkenny
- Captain: Frankie Morgan
- Manager: Martin Fitzpatrick

Provincial Champions
- Munster: Cork
- Leinster: Kilkenny
- Ulster: Antrim
- Connacht: Not Played

Championship Statistics
- Top Scorer: Dan O'Connell (6-03)

The 1988 All-Ireland Under-21 Hurling Championship was the 25th staging of the All-Ireland Under-21 Hurling Championship since its establishment by the Gaelic Athletic Association in 1964. The championship began on 8 June 1988 and ended on 11 September 1988.

Limerick entered the championship as the defending champions, however, they were beaten by Cork in the Munster final.

On 11 September 1988, Cork won the championship following a 4–11 to 1–05 defeat of Kilkenny in the All-Ireland final. This was their ninth All-Ireland title overall and their first title since 1982.

Cork's Dan O'Connelll was the championship's top scorer with 6-03.

== Results ==
=== Leinster Under-21 Hurling Championship ===
Quarter-finals

8 June 1988 Quarter-final	Wexford	0-14 - 2-05	Laois	Nowlan Park, Kilkenny
	L Dunne 0-7, M O'Connor 0-2, P Carton 0-2, V Reddy 0-1, D McDonald 0-1, V Murphy 0-1.		P Bergin 1-3, J Bates 1-1, J Daly 0-1.	Referee: P Long (Kilkenny)

Semi-finals

29 June 1988 Semi-final	Kilkenny	0-12 - 1-04	Wexford	Dr. Cullen Park, Carlow
	J Larkin 0-5, J Feehan 0-3, R Minogue 0-2, L Egan 0-2.		V Reddy 1-1, L Dunne 0-1, M O'Connor 0-1, V Murphy 0-1.	Referee: P Delaney (Laois)

29 June 1988 Semi-final	Offaly	5-23 - 0-06	Carlow	O'Moore Park, Portlaoise
	J Rigney 3-4, R Byrne 0-7, B Guinan 1-2, F Dolan 1-2, B Cahill 0-4, D Pilkington 0-2, B Mannion 0-1, S Markham 0-1.		T Doyle 0-3, M Carroll 0-2, P English 0-1.

Final

17 July 1988 Final	Kilkenny	3-13 - 2-05	Offaly	O'Moore Park, Portlaoise
	P Hoban 1-1, S Mahony 1-1, J Feehan 1-1, R Minogue 0-4, T O'Keeffe 0-3, J Larkin 0-2, L Egan 0-1.		D Pilkington 1-2, R Byrne 1-0, J Errity 0-2, G Cahill 0-1.	Referee: P Delaney (Laois)

=== Munster Under-21 Hurling Championship ===
Quarter-finals

22 June 1988 Quarter-final	Limerick	5-25 - 0-00	Kerry	Gaelic Grounds, Limerick
	P Barrett 2-3, M Galligan 1-6, J Magnier 1-4, L O'Connor 1-2, P Heffernan 0-4, TJ Burns 0-2, J Kirby 0-2, D Ryan 0-2.

22 June 1988 Quarter-final	Tipperary	2-09 - 2-15	Cork	Semple Stadium, Thurles
	D Quirke 1-0, M O'Meara 1-0, J Leahy 0-3, M Nolan 0-2, C Stakelum 0-2, S Nealon 0-1, C Bonnar 0-1.		J Fitzgibbon 1-2, F Horgan 1-1, M Foley 0-3, K McGuckin 0-3, M Mullins 0-2, B Harte 0-2, C Casey 0-1, J Tobin 0-1.	Referee: J Moore (Waterford)

Semi-finals

7 July 1988 Semi-final	Limerick	2-19 - 0-08	Waterford	Bruff Sportsfield, Bruff
	L O'Connor 1-7, M Galligan 0-8, TJ Burns 1-0, M O'Brien 0-2, P Barrett 0-1, J O'Connor 0-1.		D Henley 0-4, P Coffey 0-2, B O'Sullivan 0-1, R Ronayne 0-1.	Referee: G Long (Tipperary)

7 July 1988 Semi-final	Cork	2-08 - 1-08	Clare	FitzGerald Park, Kilmallock
	D O'Connell 1-1, J Fitzgibbon 1-0, M Mullins 0-3, F Horgan 0-2, K McGuckin 0-1, B Harte 0-1.		D McInerney 0-5, J Chaplin 1-1, T O'Brien 0-1, B Foley 0-1.	Referee: K Walsh (Limerick)

Final

27 July 1988 Final	Cork	4-12 - 1-07	Limerick	Clonmult Memorial Park, Midleton
	M Mullins 0-7, J Fitzgibbon 1-1, M Foley 1-1, F Horgan 1-1, D O'Connell 1-0, K McGuckin 0-1, B Harte 0-1.		C Carey 1-0, G Kirby 0-3, L O'Connor 0-2, M Galligan 0-1, M Houlihan 0-1.	Referee: G Ryan (Tipperary)

=== Ulster Under-21 Hurling Championship ===
Semi-final

10 July 1988 Semi-final	Down	1-09 - 1-04	Derry	Mitchel Park, Ballygalget
	M Blaney 1-3, P Mason 0-2, B Coulter 0-1, M Mallon 0-1, T Fitzsimons 0-1, F Lennon 0-1.		M Kelly 1-1, S Downey 0-2, J Donaghy 0-1.	Referee: J Gough (Antrim)

Final

24 July 1988 Final	Antrim	6-11 - 1-04	Down	Casement Park, Belfast
	J Carson 2-0, N Murray 1-2, J Elliott 1-2, A Walsh 1-0, E Donnelly 1-0, C Murphy 0-3, D McKinley 0-1, N Cantwell 0-1, J Close 0-1, L McCourty 0-1.		B Coulter 1-1, J McCrickard 0-1, M Blaney 0-1, R Coffey 0-1.

=== All-Ireland Under-21 Hurling Championship ===
Semi-finals

14 August 1988 Semi-final	Galway	2-09 - 0-19	Kilkenny	Semple Stadium, Thurles
	M Kenny 1-4, K Coen 1-0, R Duane 0-2, P Killilea 0-1, C Duffy 0-1, E Burke 0-1.		T O'Keeffe 0-7, J Feehan 0-7, L Egan 0-3, M Phelan 0-1, P Hoban 0-1.	Referee: G Ryan (Tipperary)

21 August 1988 Semi-final	Cork	4-21 - 1-03	Antrim	Croke Park, Dublin
	G Manley 1-6, D O'Connell 2-1, B Harte 1-3, F Horgan 0-3, J Corcoran 0-2, M Foley 0-2, C Casey 0-2, B Cunningham 0-2.		D McKillop 1-0, C Murphy 0-2, S Close 0-1.	Referee: P Long (Kilkenny)

Final

11 September 1988 Final	Cork	4-11 - 1-05	Kilkenny	St. Brendan's Park, Birr
	D O'Connell 2-1, M Foley 1-1, G Manley 0-4, J Fitzgibbon 1-0, F Horgan 0-3, J Corcoran 0-1, T Cooney 0-1.		J Feehan 1-0, T O'Keeffe 0-2, L Egan 0-1, P Hoban 0-1, T Murphy 0-1.	Referee: J Moore (Laois)

== Championship statistics ==
=== Top scorers ===
Overall

Rank	Player	County	Tally	Total	Matches	Average
1	Dan O'Connell	Cork	6-03	21	4	5.25
2	Mike Galligan	Limerick	1-15	19	3	6.33
3	Leo O'Connor	Limerick	2-11	17	3	5.66
3	John Feehan	Kilkenny	2-11	17	4	4.25
4	Frank Horgan	Cork	2-10	16	5	3.33
5	John Fitzgibbon	Cork	4-03	15	5	3.00
