= Grenagh =

Village in County Cork, Ireland

Grenagh Irish: Greanach
- Village
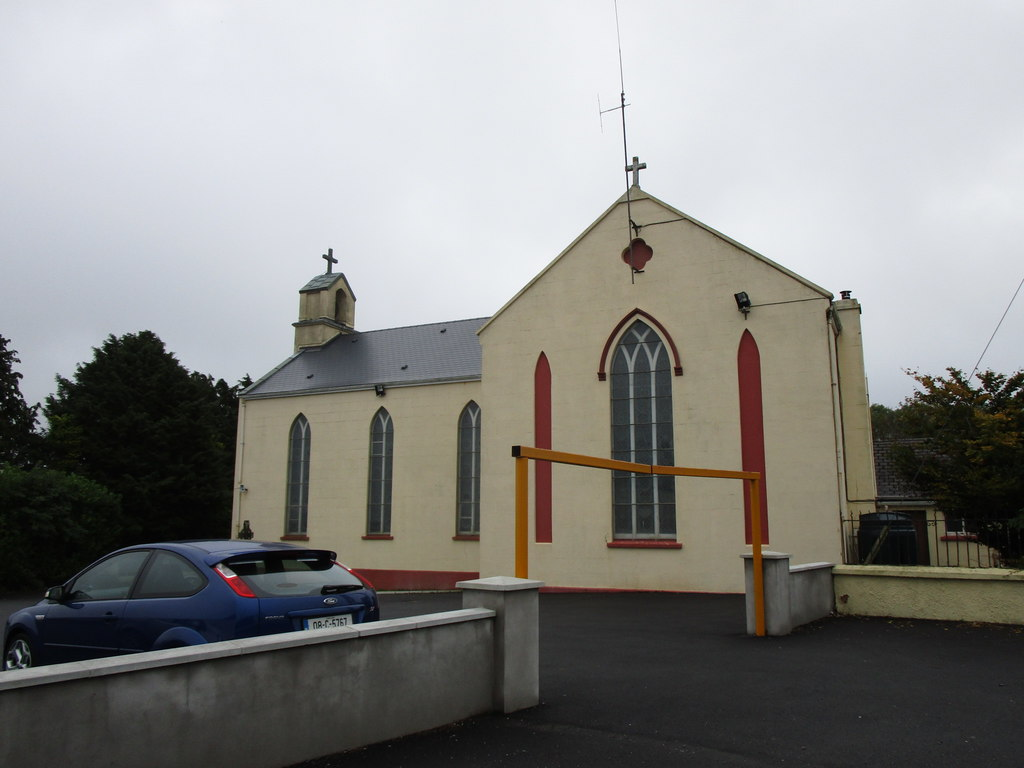
- St Lacteen's Catholic Church

- Location in Ireland
- Coordinates: 52°00′37″N 08°36′37″W
- Country: Ireland
- Province: Munster
- County: County Cork

Population (2022)
  - Total: 724
- Time zone: UTC+0 (WET)
  - Summer (DST): UTC-1 (IST (WEST))

Grenagh (Irish: Greanach) is a village close to Mallow in County Cork, Ireland. It is situated approximately 1 km from the main Cork-Limerick N20 road. The village is served by St. Lachteen's Catholic Church. The local Gaelic Athletic Association, Grenagh GAA, have twice won the Cork Intermediate A Football Championship. The village is in a civil parish of the same name. Grenagh is part of the Cork North-Central constituency.

== People ==
- Tom Kenny, hurling coach and inter-county hurler

== See also ==
- List of towns and villages in Ireland
