= Riverstick =

Village in County Cork, Ireland

Riverstick Irish: Áth an Mhaide
- Village
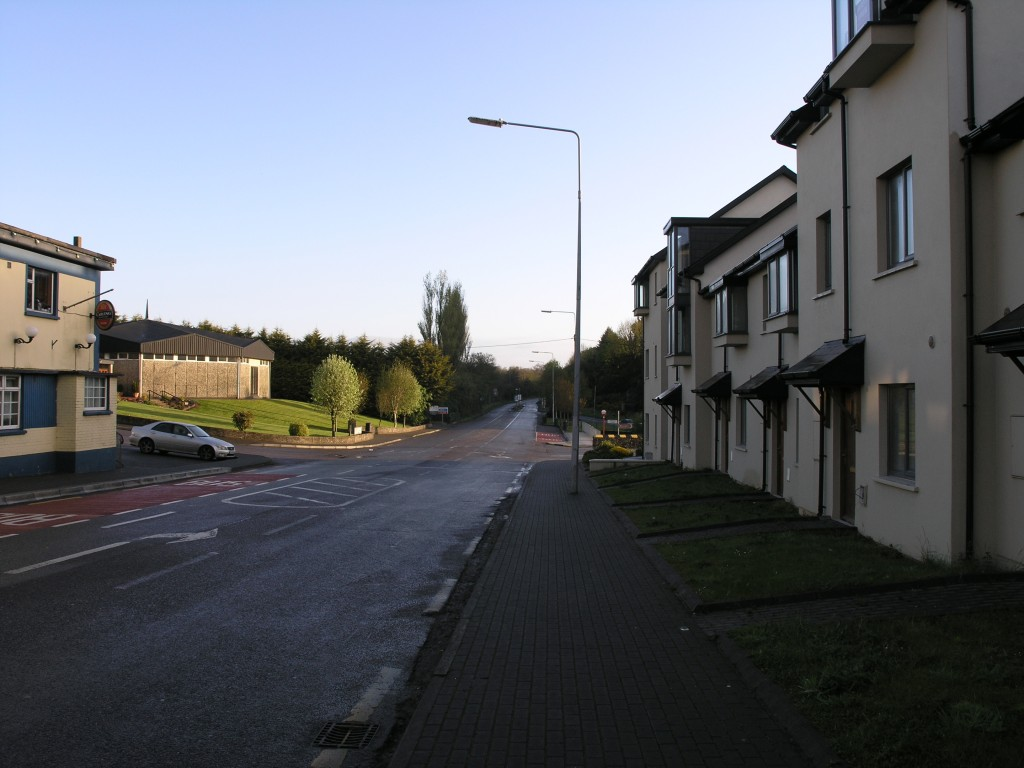
- The R600 passes through Riverstick

- Location in Ireland
- Coordinates: 51°46′23.99″N 08°29′45.06″W
- Country: Ireland
- Province: Munster
- County: County Cork

Population (2022)
  - Total: 772
- Time zone: UTC+0 (WET)
  - Summer (DST): UTC-1 (IST (WEST))

Riverstick (Irish: Áth an Mhaide) is a village in County Cork, Ireland. It lies halfway between Cork City and Kinsale. The village takes its name from the River Stick which flows through the village. The Irish form of the name, Áth an Mhaide, translates as 'ford of the Stick'.

The village has a growing population, and several housing developments were built in the area in the late 20th and early 21st century. During the course of the 20th century, Riverstick supplanted nearby Ballymartle as the major village and population centre in the area. Ballymartle is now little more than a crossroads, although some of the older institutions associated with Riverstick, such as Ballymartle GAA club, still carry the name 'Ballymartle'.

== Facilities ==
There are both Roman Catholic and Church of Ireland churches in the village. Other facilities in the area include one public house, a grocery store, a service station, a community hall, a fish & chips shop, and a pharmacy.

The local Gaelic Athletic Association club is Ballymartle, and the local athletics club is Riverstick-Kinsale AC.

== People ==
- Commandant Denny Barry, an Irish Republican, who died on hunger strike during the Irish Civil War was from Riverstick.
- Professional footballer Matt Healy, is from Riverstick.

== See also ==
- List of towns and villages in Ireland
