= Cloughduv =

Village in County Cork, Ireland

Cloughduv Cloch Dhubh Cloghduff
- Village
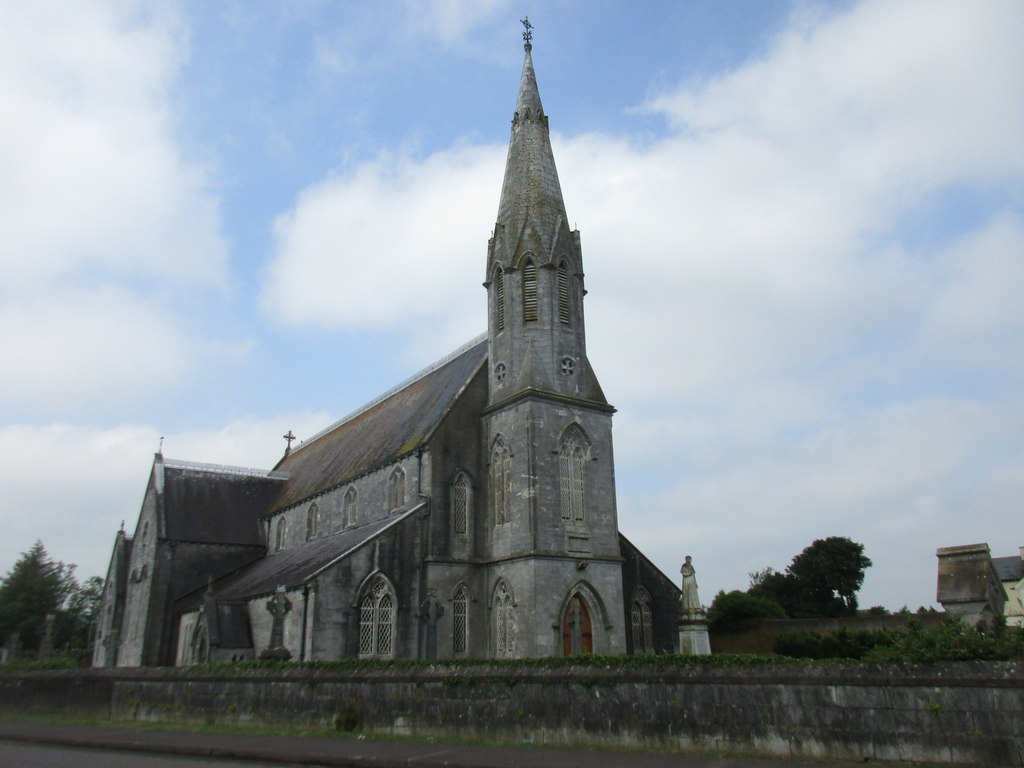
- Saint Joseph's Roman Catholic church, Cloughduv

- Location in Ireland
- Coordinates: 51°50′49″N 08°47′16″W
- Country: Ireland
- Province: Munster
- County: County Cork

Population (2022)
  - Total: 440
- Time zone: UTC+0 (WET)
  - Summer (DST): UTC-1 (IST (WEST))

Cloughduv or Cloghduff (/klɒxˈdʌv/ klokh-DUV; Irish: Cloch Dhubh, meaning 'black stone') is a village in County Cork, Ireland. As of the 2022 census, it had a population of 440 people. The main industry is agriculture, although it is also a commuter village for Cork City. Cloughduv is part of the Dáil constituency of Cork North-West. The village is 1.4 km from the River Bride.

== Amenities ==
The village of Cloughduv consists of a pub, a shop, a church and a number of housing estates. The former Cloughduv Creamery closed in 2018 after 126 years in business. Cloughduv is served by St. Joseph's Catholic Church.

Cloughduv GAA is the local Gaelic Athletic Association club.

== See also ==
- List of towns and villages in Ireland
