= Delaney Rovers GAA =

Gaelic Athletic Association club in Cork, Ireland

Delaney Rovers
- Founded: 1949
- County: Cork
- Colours: Green White, and Gold

Playing kits
Standard colours

Delaneys Rovers GAA is a Gaelic Athletic Association club in Cork, Ireland. It draws its players from the Dublin Hill area on the northside of the city. Teams are fielded in Gaelic football, hurling and camogie. The club participates in Cork GAA competitions and in Seandún board competitions. Founding members were Will O'Sullivan and Tom McCarthy

== History ==
The club is named after brothers Jeremiah and Cornelius Delaney, killed by British forces at their home at Dublin Hill on the night of 11–12 December 1920 (the night of The Burning of Cork). The two brothers were members of F Company, 1st Battalion, Cork No. 1 Brigade, I.R.A.

== Achievements ==
- Cork Intermediate Hurling Championship Winner (1) 2002 Runners-Up 1997
- Cork Junior Hurling Championship Runners-Up 1982
- Cork Junior Football Championship Winners (1) 1955 Runner-Up 1951
- Cork Minor B Football Championship Winners (1) 1986 Runners-Up 1988, 1989
- Cork City Junior Hurling Championship Winners (5) 1974, 1980, 1982, 1986, 1988 Runners-Up 1971, 1972, 1991
- Cork City Junior Football Championship Winners (6) 1954, 1955, 1977, 2015, 2017, 2018 Runners-Up 1951, 1980, 2016

== Notable players ==
- Barry Egan
