= Liam Ó Tuama =

Irish hurler and Gaelic footballer (1931–2019)

William Twomey
- Liam Ó Tuama
- Born: 1931; Blackpool, Cork, Ireland
- Died: 14 August 2019 (aged 87); Bishopstown, Cork, Ireland
- Resting place: St Oliver's Cemetery
- Known for: Gaelic games player, selector and administrator
- Spouse: Alice Conway
- Children: 4
- Parent(s): Aodh Ó Tuama; Eibhlín Ní Éigearta
- Relatives: Seán Ó Tuama (brother)

William Twomey (1931 – 14 August 2019), known as Liam Ó Tuama, was an Irish hurler and Gaelic footballer, Gaelic Athletic Association administrator and selector.

== Playing career ==
Ó Tuama played hurling with Glen Rovers and Gaelic football with sister club St. Nicholas'. He was a member of the Glen team that won the Cork JHC title in 1950 before later winning four Cork IHC titles in five seasons. Ó Tuama was goalkeeper on the Cork junior hurling team that beat Warwickshire in the 1955 All-Ireland junior final.

== Management career ==
Ó Tuama held a number of administrative positions with the Glen Rovers club, including secretary, chairman and county board delegate. He was a selector with the Cork senior hurling team that won the 1990 All-Ireland SHC.

== Honours ==
=== Player ===
Glen Rovers

- Cork Intermediate Hurling Championship: 1954, 1956, 1957, 1958
- Cork Junior Hurling Championship: 1950

Cork

- All-Ireland Junior Hurling Championship: 1950
- Munster Junior Hurling Championship: 1950

=== Selector ===
- All-Ireland Senior Hurling Championship: 1990
- Munster Senior Hurling Championship: 1990
