= 2008 Cork Intermediate Hurling Championship =

Irish sporting event

- Dates: 2 May 2008 – 12 October 2008
- Teams: 16
- Sponsor: Evening Echo
- Champions: Carrigaline (1st title); Peter Murphy (captain); Gerry O'Sullivan (manager)
- Runners-up: Bandon; Brian Walsh (captain); Red Crowley (manager)
- Relegated: St. Finbarr's

Tournament statistics
- Matches played: 28
- Goals scored: 63 (2.25 per match)
- Points scored: 702 (25.07 per match)
- Top scorer(s): Darren Crowley (0-36)

The 2008 Cork Intermediate Hurling Championship was the 99th staging of the Cork Intermediate Hurling Championship since its establishment by the Cork County Board in 1909. The draw for the opening fixtures took place on 16 December 2007. The championship began on 2 May 2008 and ended on 12 October 2008.

On 12 October 2008, Carrigaline won the championship after a 1–13 to 0–10 defeat of Bandon in the final at Páirc Uí Chaoimh. This was their first ever championship title in this grade.

Bandon's Darren Crowley was the championship's top scorer with 0-36.

== Team changes ==
=== To Championship ===
Promoted from the Cork Junior A Hurling Championship

- Barryroe

Relegated from the Cork Premier Intermediate Hurling Championship

- Delanys

=== From Championship ===
Promoted to the Cork Premier Intermediate Hurling Championship

- Fr. O'Neill's

Relegated to the City Junior A Hurling Championship

- Glen Rovers

== Results ==
=== First round ===
2 May 2008 First round	Milford	2-15 - 2-15	Éire Óg	Croke Memorial Park
	S O'Connell 0-7, P O'Regan 0-5, R Geary 1-0, D O'Brien 1-0, M O'Connell 0-1, A Watson 0-1, H O'Gorman 0-1.		D Goulding 2-4, T Cronin 0-5, C Sheehan 0-4, T O'Leary 0-1, J Malone 0-1.

3 May 2008 First round	St. Finbarr's	1-11 - 0-16	Carrigaline	Shanbally
	D O'Regan 0-5, J Power 1-1, E Maher 0-2, P Harte 0-1, P Cronin 0-1, D O'Leary 0-1.		S Corcoran 0-7, M O'Sullivan 0-3, T Murphy 0-2, S O'Brien 0-2, J Moran 0-1, P Ronayne 0-1.

3 May 2008 First round	Barryroe	0-10 - 1-13	Bandon	Timoleague
	K Griffin 0-4, P Collins 0-2, D Harrington 0-2, C Hurley 0-1, J O'Donovan 0-1.		D Crowley 0-8, D Burke 1-1, D Lucey 0-4.

4 May 2008 First round	Ballygarvan	0-10 - 0-12	Kanturk	Ovens
	S White 0-3, D O'Sullivan 0-2, M O'Riordan 0-2, G White 0-1, M Dowd 0-1, D Bouse 0-1.		M McLoughlin 0-9, D Duane 0-1, W Murphy 0-1.

4 May 2008 First round	Kilworth	0-11 - 1-15	Kilbrittain	Páirc Liam Mhic Cárthaigh
	A Mannix 0-5, D McNamara 0-2, P Lynch 0-2, T Twomey 0-1, E Pierce 0-1.		P O'Mahony 1-2, M Sexton 0-5, A Hayes 0-2, R Cashman 0-2, D O'Connell 0-2, V O'Brien 0-1, T Harrington 0-1.

4 May 2008 First round	Delanys	1-11 - 3-10	Cobh	Caherlag Sportsfield
	K Foley 0-6, P Finnegan 0-4, B Aherne 1-0, A Cafferky 0-1.		A Stack 2-1, D Barrett 0-5, D Meaney 1-0, J Meaney 0-3, E Wilson 0-1.

4 May 2008 First round	Dromina	0-04 - 2-14	Blackrock	Ballyhooley
	P Gould 0-2, A O'Shaughnessy 0-1, J Finn 0-1.		D Coughlan 1-3, M Russell 1-3, W Kennedy 0-3, P O'Sullivan 0-2, D O'Shea 0-1, K Magee 0-1, P Tierney 0-1.

4 May 2008 First round	Valley Rovers	2-21 - 2-09	St. Vincent's	Páirc Liam Mhic Cárthaigh
	K Canty 2-6, J Hurley 0-6, K White 0-4, E Collins 0-3, T Burke 0-1, J Crowley 0-1.		C Barry 1-6, S Ray 1-0, P Aherne 0-1, R Desmond 0-1, D Duggan 0-1.

9 May 2008 First round replay	Milford	2-14 - 3-10	Éire Óg	Croke Memorial Park
	SP O'Regan 1-4, J Cremin 1-2, S O'Connell 0-4, D O'Brien 0-2, J O'Brien 0-1, A Watson 0-1.		T Cronin 2-6, D Goulding 1-1, T O'Leary 0-1, F Sheehan 0-1, J Dineen 0-1.

=== Second round ===
16 May 2008 Second round	St. Vincent's	0-17 - 2-12	Kilworth	Rathcormac
	C Barry 0-12, JP Murphy 0-2, A Fenton 0-1, J Buckley 0-1, D Duggan 0-1.		A Mannix 1-7, E Pierce 1-2, D McNamara 0-2, L Whelan 0-1.

17 May 2008 Second round	Dromina	2-13 - 1-07	Delanys	Mallow GAA Complex
	A O'Shaughnessy 0-7, P Hayes 1-2, K Hayes 0-4, J Finn 1-0.		E Culhane 1-3, K Foley 0-2, R Foley 0-1, P Finnegan 0-1.

17 May 2008 Second round	Éire Óg	1-11 - 0-11	Ballygarvan	Brinny Sportsfield
	C Sheehan 0-6, T Cronin 1-2, T O'Leary 0-2, D Goulding 0-1.		M O'Riordan 0-3, S White 0-3, D O'Sullivan 0-2, L Dillon 0-2, G White 0-1.

22 May 2008 Second round	Barryroe	3-10 - 0-05	St. Finbarr's	Jack Barrett Park
	D Harrington 1-1, K Griffin 0-4, C Hurley 1-0, J Fleming 1-0, A Fleming 0-3, J O'Donovan 0-1, G Whelton 0-1.		D O'Regan 0-3, R O'Dwyer 0-1, P Harte 0-1.

=== Third round ===
15 June 2008 Third round	Kilworth	1-11 - 3-08	Milford	Fr. Con Buckley Park
	A Mannix 0-6, B Tobin 1-0, P Lynch 0-2, E Pierce 0-1, J Moakley 0-1, D McNamara 0-1.		A Watson 2-1, M O'Connell 1-0, P O'Regan 0-3, S O'Connell 0-3, H O'Gorman 0-1.

19 June 2008 Third round	Kilbrittain	0-15 - 1-18	Bandon	Timoleague
	M Sexton 0-6, R Cashman 0-2, V O'Brien 0-2, J O'Brien 0-1, P O'Mahony 0-1, P Sexton 0-1, A Hayes 0-1, D O'Connell 0-1.		D Crowley 0-10, R Crowley 0-5, D Burke 1-0, R Payne 0-2, D O'Donoghue 0-1.

20 June 2008 Third round	Éire Óg	1-15 - 2-08	Cobh	Páirc Uí Rinn
	C Sheehan 0-5, F Sheehan 1-1, D Corkery 0-2, T O'Leary 0-2, D Goulding 0-1, J Dineen 0-1, J Malone 0-1, J Crowley 0-1, D Herlihy 0-1.		P Sloane 0-4, B Aherne 1-0, S Kearney 1-0, P Meaney 0-2, J Meaney 0-1, A Stack 0-1.

21 June 2008 Third round	Blackrock	0-08 - 2-16	Valley Rovers	Páirc Liam Mhic Cárthaigh
	B Cashman 0-2, W Kennedy 0-2, M Russell 0-2, G Cleary 0-1, E O'Farrell 0-1.		E Collins 1-7, K Canty 1-5, J Burke 0-1, T Burke 0-1, F Coughlan 0-1, K White 0-1.

=== Relegation playoffs ===
15 June 2008 Semi-final	Delanys	1-11 - 0-14	St. Finbarr's	Páirc Uí Rinn
	C McCarthy 1-1, K Foley 0-3, M O'Driscoll 0-2, P Finnegan 0-2, P Laide 0-1, G Quinlan 0-1, E Cullinane 0-1.		D O'Regan 0-5, EP O'Callaghan 0-2, P Kennedy 0-1, S Fuller 0-1, P Wiley 0-1, P Harte 0-1, J Power 0-1, R O'Dwyer 0-1, P O'Brien 0-1.

22 June 2008 Semi-final	St. Vincent's	2-11 - 1-16	Ballygarvan	Páirc Uí Rinn
	C Barry 0-5, J Buckley 1-1, P Cunnane 1-0, A Fenton 0-3, JP Murphy 0-1, K Goulding 0-1.		D Sweeney 1-2, L Dillon 0-5, M Kennefick 0-5, G White 0-3, D O'Sullivan 0-1.

22 June 2009 Semi-final replay	Delanys	2-15 - 2-13 (aet)	St. Finbarr's	Páirc Uí Rinn
	K Foley 1-9, S O'Connor 1-0, P Finnegan 0-3, E Cullinane 0-1, M Heaphy 0-1, K McCarthy 0-1.		D O'Regan 0-7, I O'Mahony 1-1, B Cunningham 1-0, C Duffy 0-2, P Buckley 0-1, J Power 0-1, R O'Dwyer 0-1.

20 July 2008 Final	St. Vincent's	1-14 - 1-12	St. Finbarr's	Páirc Uí Rinn
	C Barry 0-9, S Ray 1-0, K Goulding 0-2, P Ahern 0-2, J Buckley 0-1.		B Cunningham 1-3, E Maher 0-4, R O'Dwyer 0-1, C Duffy 0-1, D O'Connor 0-1, P Kennedy 0-1, D O'Regan 0-1.

=== Quarter-finals ===
5 July 2008 Quarter-final	Kanturk	0-14 - 0-12	Dromina	Páirc Mhic Ghiobúir
	L McLoughlin 0-8, E Ahern 0-3, B Mullane 0-3.		A O'Shaughnessy 0-9, J Hamilton 0-1, P Hayes 0-1, D Carroll 0-1.

18 July 2008 Quarter-final	Bandon	1-17 - 2-11	Milford	Coachford Sportsfield
	D Crowley 0-6, D Burke 1-1, R Crowley 0-4, J Hickey 0-3, R Payne 0-2, D Lucey 0-1.		D O'Brien 2-0, S O'Connell 0-4, E Dillon 0-3, A Watson 0-1, M O'Connell 0-1, H O'Gorman 0-1, J Cremin 0-1.

20 July 2008 Quarter-final	Carrigaline	1-12 - 0-14	Barryroe	Jack Barrett Park
	S Corcoran 0-6, T Murphy 1-0, S O'Brien 0-3, P Ronayne 0-1, P Murphy 0-1, M O'Sullivan 0-1.		K Griffin 0-9, C Hurley 0-2, G Coleman 0-1, P Collins 0-1, J O'Donovan 0-1.

14 September 2008 Quarter-final	Valley Rovers	1-12 - 1-10	Éire Óg	Páirc Uí Rinn
	E Collins 0-7, K Canty 1-1, S O'Neill 0-1, J Burke 0-1, K White 0-1, J Young 0-1.		C Sheehan 0-7, J Dineen 1-1, J Malone 0-1, D Goulding 0-1.

=== Semi-finals ===
21 September 2008 Semi-final	Carrigaline	2-17 - 0-19	Kanturk	Coachford Sportsfield
	S Corcoran 0-13, S O'Brien 1-2, T Murphy 1-0, M O'Sullivan 0-1, N Murphy 0-1.		L McLoughlin 0-8, A Walsh 0-6, J Healy 0-2, F Browne 0-1, A Nash 0-1, D Duane 0-1.

28 September 2008 Semi-final	Bandon	1-18 - 2-11	Valley Rovers	Páirc Uí Chaoimh
	D O'Donoghue 0-7, D Crowley 0-7, E O'Donovan 1-0, J O'Donovan 0-1, D Lucey 0-1, A Johnston 0-1, R Crowley 0-1.		E Collins 1-5, K Canty 1-0, J Hurley 0-2, S O'Sullivan 0-1, J Burke 0-1, K White 0-1, E Manning 0-1.

=== Final ===
12 October 2008 Final	Carrigaline	1-13 - 0-10	Bandon	Páirc Uí Chaoimh
	S Corcoran 0-5, S O'Brien 1-1, W O'Brien 0-2, D Drake 0-2, J Moran 0-1, T Murphy 0-1, P Murphy 0-1.		D Crowley 0-5, D O'Donoghue 0-2, N O'Rourke 0-1, E O'Donovan 0-1, D Lucey 0-1.

== Championship statistics ==
=== Top scorers ===
Overall

Rank	Player	Club	Tally	Total	Matches	Average
1	Darren Crowley	Bandon	0-36	36	5	7.20
2	Cian Barry	St. Vincent's	1-32	35	4	8.75
3	Stephen Corcoran	Carrigaline	0-31	31	4	7.75
4	Éamonn Collins	Valley Rovers	2-22	28	4	7.00
5	Kevin Canty	Valley Rovers	5-12	27	4	6.75
6	Lorcán McLoughlin	Kanturk	0-25	25	3	8.33
7	Kevin Foley	Delanys	1-20	23	4	5.75
7	Tim Cronin	Éire Óg	3-13	22	4	5.50
7	Ciarán Sheehan	Éire Óg	0-22	22	4	5.50
8	Adrian Mannix	Kilworth	1-18	21	3	7.00
8	Denis O'Regan	St. Finbarr's	0-21	21	5	4.20

In a single game

Rank	Player	Club	Tally	Total	Opposition
1	Kevin Canty	Valley Rovers	2-06	12	St. Vincent's
1	Tim Cronin	Éire Óg	2-06	12	Milford
1	Kevin Foley	Delanys	1-09	12	St. Finbarr's
1	Cian Barry	St. Vincent's	0-12	12	Kanturk
2	Daniel Goulding	Éire Óg	2-04	10	Milford
2	Adrian Mannix	Kilworth	1-07	10	St. Vincent's
2	Éamonn Collins	Valley Rovers	1-07	10	Blackrock
2	Darren Crowley	Bandon	0-10	10	Kilbrittain
3	Cian Barry	St. Vincent's	1-06	9	Valley Rovers
3	Lorcán McLoughlin	Kanturk	0-09	9	Ballygarvan
3	Cian Barry	St. Vincent's	0-09	9	St. Finbarr's
3	Andrew O'Shaughnessy	Dromina	0-09	9	Kanturk
3	Kieran Griffin	Barryroe	1-06	9	Carrigaline
