= 1972 Cork Intermediate Hurling Championship =

Irish hurling competition

- Dates: 16 April – 15 October 1972
- Teams: 14
- Champions: Mallow (2nd title); Tommy Sheehan (captain); Derry Mannix (manager)
- Runners-up: Blackrock

Tournament statistics
- Matches played: 13
- Goals scored: 69 (5.31 per match)
- Points scored: 217 (16.69 per match)

The 1972 Cork Intermediate Hurling Championship was the 63rd staging of the Cork Intermediate Hurling Championship since its establishment by the Cork County Board in 1909. The draw for the opening round fixtures took place at the Cork Convention on 30 January 1972. The championship began on 16 April 1972 and ended on 15 October 1972.

On 15 October 1972, Mallow won the championship following a 4-10 to 1-09 defeat of Blackrock in the final. This was their second championship title overall and their first title since 1959.

== Team changes ==
=== To Championship ===
Promoted from the Cork Junior Hurling Championship

- Bandon

Regraded from the Cork Senior Hurling Championship

- Cloyne

Fielded their second team

- Youghal

=== From Championship ===
Promoted to the Cork Senior Hurling Championship

- Nemo Rangers

Regraded to the various Divisional Junior Championships

- Kanturk
- Shamrocks
- Tracton

== Results ==
=== First round ===
| 16 April 1972 First round | Brian Dillons | 1-03 – 4-08 | Castletownroche | Castlelyons Sportsfield |

| 30 April 1972 First round | Cobh | 2-07 – 2-03 | Newtownshandrum | Moore Park |

| 7 May 1972 First round | Carrigtwohill | 3-04 – 1-12 | Cloughduv | Cork Athletic Grounds |

| 20 May 1972 First round | Ballincollig | 3-04 – 3-06 | Blackrock | Ballinhassig Sportsfield |

| 28 May 1972 First round | Midleton | 1-11 – 5-08 | Glen Rovers | Páirc Uí Chonaill |

| 28 May 1972 First round | Bandon | 9-15 – 4-06 | Youghal | Cork Athletic Grounds |

=== Quarter-finals ===
| 14 May 1972 Quarter-final | Cloyne | 1-04 – 2-16 | Mallow | Páirc Mac Gearailt |

| 8 July 1972 Quarter-final | Blackrock | 2-05 – 2-03 | Castletownroche | Páirc Mac Gearailt |

| 16 July 1972 Quarter-final | Cobh | 2-07 – 0-08 | Cloughduv | Cork Athletic Grounds |

| 27 August 1972 Quarter-final | Glen Rovers | 2-05 – 3-16 | Bandon | Kinsale Sportsfield |

=== Semi-finals ===
| 4 August 1972 Semi-final | Blackrock | 2-17 – 3-06 | Cobh | Riverstown Sportsfield |

| 17 September 1972 Semi-final | Mallow | 4-15 – 3-09 | Bandon | Cork Athletic Grounds |
| | T Sheehan 0-9, B Barrett 2-0, J McSweeney 1-1, E O'Sullivan 1-1, K Sheehan 0-4. | | L Ryan 2-1, D McCarthy 1-0, N Crowley 0-3, F Crowley 0-2, R Crowley 0-2, J Gabriel 0-1. | Referee: P Cronin (St. Finbarr's) |

=== Final ===
| 15 October 1972 Final | Mallow | 4-10 – 1-09 | Blackrock | Blarney Sportsfield |
| | T Sheehan 2-6, B Barrett 1-1, P Carey 1-0, K Sheehan 0-2, E Sullivan 0-1. | | J Redmond 1-1, S Kelly 0-2, K Cummins 0-2, P Flynn 0-1, B Dillon 0-1, N O'Keeffe 0-1. | Referee: J O'Brien (Cobh) |
