= 2012 Cork Intermediate Hurling Championship =

Irish hurling competition

- Dates: 26 May 2012 – 14 October 2012
- Teams: 16
- Sponsor: Evening Echo
- Champions: Kilworth (1st title); Brian Tobin (captain); T. J. Ryan (manager)
- Runners-up: Kanturk; Donagh Duane (captain); Tim Burke (manager)
- Relegated: Blackrock

Tournament statistics
- Matches played: 29
- Goals scored: 79 (2.72 per match)
- Points scored: 968 (33.38 per match)
- Top scorer(s): Adrian Mannix (2-31)

The 2012 Cork Intermediate Hurling Championship was the 103rd staging of the Cork Intermediate Hurling Championship since its establishment by the Cork County Board in 1909. The draw for the opening round fixtures took place on 11 December 2011. The championship began on 26 May 2012 and ended on 14 October 2012.

On 14 October 2012, Kilworth won the championship following a 2-15 to 2-13 defeat of Kanturk in the final at Páirc Uí Rinn. This was their first ever championship title.

Kilworth's Adrian Mannix was the championship's top scorer with 2-31.

== Team changes ==
=== To Championship ===
Promoted from the Cork Junior A Hurling Championship

- Charleville

Relegated from the Cork Premier Intermediate Hurling Championship

- Argideen Rangers

=== From Championship ===
Promoted to the Cork Premier Intermediate Hurling Championship

- Bandon

Relegated to the East Cork Junior A Hurling Championship

- Cobh

== Results ==
=== First round ===
26 May 2012 First round	Éire Óg	0-19 - 0-20 (aet)	Charleville	Mallow GAA Complex
	K Hallissey 0-6, C Sheehan 0-4, T Dineen 0-3, J Dineen 0-3, D Herlihy 0-2, C Murphy 0-1.		P Gammell 0-5, A Cagney 0-4, M Gammell 0-4, D O'Flynn 0-3, J Casey 0-1, B Dennehy 0-1, A O'Connor 0-1, M Kavanagh 0-1.

26 May 2012 First round	Aghada	1-15 - 4-09	Fermoy	St. Catherine's Park
	T O'Keeffe 0-9, P O'Neill 1-2, T Wall 0-1, JP O'Connor 0-1, C Fleming 0-1, G Melvin 0-1.		D Geary 1-4, P Shanahan 2-0, J Hutchings 1-0, A O'Connor 0-2, T Clancy 0-2, B O'Sullivan 0-1.

26 May 2012 First round	Argideen Rangers	3-09 - 1-09	Kanturk	Coachford Sportsfield
	F Butler 1-3, M Walsh 1-2, B Hennessy 1-1, M O'Callaghan 0-2, JM O'Callaghan 0-1.		A Walsh 0-4, A Nash 1-0, L McLoughlin 0-1, D Kenneally 0-1, M Healy 0-1, J Healy 0-1, R Fanning 0-1.

1 June 2012 First round	Kilworth	2-16 - 2-08	Dromina	Kildorrery
	A Mannix 1-6, P Lynch 1-5, L Whelan 0-2, D Cahill 0-1, J Cahill 0-1, N McNamara 0-1.		A O'Shaughnessy 1-1, P Hayes 1-0, M Naughton 0-2, P Hassett 0-2, J Finn 0-2, G Hayes 0-1.

2 June 2012 First round	Blackrock	1-11 - 0-15 (aet)	Milford	Castletownroche
	M O'Donoghue 1-1, B Cashman 0-4, G Regan 0-3, J Young 0-2, C Bonus 0-1.		S O'Connell 0-12, A Watson 0-1, H O'Gorman 0-1, P O'Flynn 0-1.

3 June 2012 First round	St. Catherine's	0-09 - 0-11	Ballygarvan	Felix Sarsfield Memorial Park
	P Roche 0-4, R Clancy 0-2, S Kearney 0-2, P O'Connor 0-1.		M Kennefick 0-4, G White 0-2, D McCarthy 0-2, S White 0-1, T Quilligan 0-1, M O'Riordan 0-1.

3 June 2012 First round	Dripsey	0-09 - 1-15	Meelin	Mallow GAA Complex
	M O'Sullivan 0-2, D O'Sullivan 0-2, D O'Riordan 0-2, D Buckley 0-2, D McMahon 0-1.		J Forrest 0-6, W Murphy 1-1, J Curtin 0-2, D O'Riordan 0-2, L Collins 0-2, W Buckley 0-1, J O'Callaghan 0-1.

3 June 2012 First round	Fr. O'Neill's	2-13 - 0-17	Barryroe	Páirc Liam Mhic Cárthaigh
	G O'Leary 0-6, N Griffin 1-0, P Butler 1-0, L Swayne 0-2, E McCarthy 0-2, L O'Driscoll 0-1, A Brett 0-1, P McMahon 0-1.		K Griffin 0-7, T Harrington 0-3, J O'Donovan 0-2, D O'Sullivan 0-2, A Fleming 0-1, M O'Brien 0-1, K McCarthy 0-1.

=== Second round ===
16 June 2012 Second round	Dromina	1-08 - 2-14	St. Catherine's	Kildorrery
	A O'Shaughnessy 0-5, J Jordan 1-0, K Hayes 0-2, B Bowles 0-1.		P Roche 1-2, J Mulcahy 1-1, R Clancy 0-4, M Mulcahy 0-3, S Kearney 0-2, D Farrell 0-1, D Mangan 0-1.;

17 June 2012 Second round	Blackrock	0-12 - 0-16	Aghada	Clonmult Memorial Park
	B Cashman 0-9, D Cremin 0-2, M Drummond 0-1.		T O'Keeffe 0-11, T Wall 0-2, J Connolly 0-1, W Leahy 0-1, G Melvin 0-1.

17 June 2012 Second round	Barryroe	4-13 - 2-12	Dripsey	Brinny Sportsfield
	M O'Brien 2-4 K Griffin 1-3, D Harrington 1-0, T Harrington 0-3, C Hurley 0-2, J O'Donovan 0-1.		D O'Riordan 0-7, D O'Sullivan 1-1, J Carey 1-0, M O'Sullivan 0-3, B O'Regan 0-1.

26 June 2012 Second round	Kanturk	5-14 - 1-13	Éire Óg	Mallow GAA Complex
	L McLoughlin 1-7, J Healy 2-0, I Walsh 1-2, M Healy 1-1, A Walsh 0-1, D Kenneally 0-1, C Burke 0-1, W Murphy 0-1.		C Sheehan 0-6, J Dineen 0-5, T O'Leary 1-0, K Hallissey 0-1, D O'Connor 0-1.

=== Third round ===
30 June 2012 Third round	Dromina	0-11 - 0-10	Drispey	Kanturk
	A O'Shaughnessy 0-8, P Hayes 0-2, J Jordan 0-1.		M O'Sullivan 0-5, D Buckley 0-2, D O'Sullivan 0-1, S Burke 0-1, B O'Regan 0-1.

14 July 2012 Third round	Blackrock	0-16 - 2-12	Éire Óg	Ballincollig
	B Cashman 0-8, S Murphy 0-2, D Cremin 0-2, M O'Donoghue 0-1, E Buckley 0-1, B O'Sullivan 0-1, D Gosnell 0-1.		J Dineen 0-8, D Goulding 1-1, K Hallissey 1-1, C Sheehan 0-2.

=== Relegation playoff ===
28 July 2012 Relegation playoff	Dripsey	2-14 - 1-14	Blackrock	Brinny Sportsfield
	D O'Sullivan 1-4, D O'Riordan 0-7, S Murray 1-0, M O'Sullivan 0-1, J Carey 0-1, B O'Regan 0-1.		E Hegarty 1-3, B Cashman 0-6, C Bonus 0-1, D Gosnell 0-1, S Murphy 0-1, F Ryan 0-1, D Moran 0-1.

=== Fourth round ===
27 July 2012 Fourth round	Meelin	2-18 - 2-16	Milford	Dr. Mannix Sportsfield
	W Buckley 1-2, J Curtin 1-2, W Murphy 0-5, J Forrest 0-5, B O'Sullivan 0-2, DJ O'Sullivan 0-1, TJ Brosnan 0-1.		H O'Gorman 0-11, P O'Regan 2-2, J Cremin 0-2, A Watson 0-1.

28 July 2012 Fourth round	St. Catherine's	0-11 - 0-17	Charleville	Glanworth Sportsfield
	K Dineen 0-5, K Kearney 0-2, D Mangan 0-2, B Mulcahy 0-1, M Mulcahy 0-1.		D O'Flynn 0-4, J O'Brien 0-4, M Gammell 0-2, J Casey 0-2, P Gammell 0-2, B Dennehy 0-2, A O'Connor 0-1.

4 August 2012 Fourth round	Ballygarvan	3-17 - 4-13	Barryroe	Cloughduv
	D McCarthy 1-4, M Kennefick 0-7, J Spillane 1-1, K Ashman 1-0, Damien O'Sullivan 0-1, M O'Riordan 0-1, S White 0-1, Donald O'Sullivan 0-1, G White 0-1.		T Harrington 1-4, C Cahalane 2-0, M O'Brien 1-1, K Griffin 0-3, K McCarthy 0-2, G Coleman 0-1, D Harrington 0-1, D O'Sullivan 0-1.

11 August 2012 Fourth round	Fr. O'Neill's	2-16 - 1-15	Éire Óg	Riverstown Sportsfield
	G O'Leary 1-7, L Swayne 1-1, E Conway 0-2, P Butler 0-2, E Holland 0-2, W Joyce 0-2.		J Dineen 0-8, D Goulding 1-0, C Sheehan 0-2, K Hallissey 0-2, M O'Shea 0-2, P McDonagh 0-1.

31 August 2012 Fourth round	Dromina	0-07 - 3-21	Kanturk	Gaels Memorial Grounds
	A O'Shaughnessy 0-3, K Hayes 0-2, P Hayes 0-1, R Morrissey 0-1.		L McLoughlin 0-5, A Walsh 0-5, M Healy 1-1, M O'Riordan 1-1, A Nash 1-0, L O'Neill 0-3, A O'Keeffe 0-2, J Healy 0-2, J Browne 0-1, W Murphy 0-1.

2 September 2012 Fourth round	Argideen Rangers	1-14 - 1-13	Aghada	Brinny Sportsfield
	JM O'Callaghan 0-5, B Hennessy 1-1, M Walsh 0-3, F Butler 0-2, J Sheehan 0-2, M O'Callaghan 0-1.		T O'Keeffe 1-1, T Wall 0-4, C Fleming 0-3, W Leahy 0-1, J Connolly 0-1, P O'Neill 0-1, S Wall 0-1, E Savage 0-1.

=== Quarter-finals ===
10 August 2012 Quarter-final	Kilworth	2-15 - 1-09	Fermoy	Ballygiblin Sportsfield
	A Mannix 0-9, P Lynch 2-1, L Whelan 0-2, J Cahill 0-1, N McNamara 0-1, M Wade 0-1.		D Geary 1-3, T Grumbridge 0-2, B O'Sullivan 0-1, J Hutchings 0-1, A O'Connor 0-1, P Shanahan 0-1.

11 August 2012 Quarter-final	Charleville	1-25 - 2-07	Ballygarvan	Mallow GAA Complex
	P Gammell 0-7, A O'Connor 1-1, A Cagney 0-4, J O'Brien 0-3, D Murphy 0-3, J Casey 0-2, D O'Flynn 0-2, B Dennehy 0-2, M Kavanagh 0-1.		J Spillane 1-1, K Cashman 1-0, M Kennefick 0-3, A Murphy 0-1, G White 0-1, G Spillane 0-1.

9 September 2012 Quarter-final	Argideen Rangers	1-15 - 2-12	Meelin	Cloughduv
	M Walsh 0-6, J Sheehan 1-1, JM O'Callaghan 0-4, M O'Callaghan 0-2, B Hennessy 0-1, F Butler 0-1.		W Buckley 1-2, J Forrest 0-5, DJ O'Sullivan 1-0, J Curtin 0-2, B Collins 0-2, D O'Riordan 0-1.

22 September 2012 Quarter-final replay	Argideen Rangers	1-12 - 0-13	Meelin	Cloughduv
	M Walsh 1-6, JM O'Callaghan 0-2, B Hennessy 0-1, J Sheehan 0-1, J Deasy 0-1, M Coomey 0-1.		J Forrest 0-5, D O'Riordan 0-3, J Curtin 0-2, W Buckley 0-1, L Collins 0-1, J O'Callaghan 0-1.

22 September 2012 Quarter-final	Fr. O'Neill's	1-15 - 2-15	Kanturk	Páirc Mac Gearailt
	G O'Leary 0-4, E Holland 1-0, L Savage 0-3, E Conway 0-3, A Brett 0-2, P Butler 0-2, W Joyce 0-1.		A Walsh 0-4, L McLOughlin 0-4, A Nash 1-0, J Browne 1-0, I Walsh 0-2, M Healy 0-2, J McLoughlin 0-1, J Healy 0-1, A O'Keeffe 0-1.

=== Semi-finals ===
28 September 2012 Semi-final	Kanturk	2-15 - 2-12	Charleville	Páirc Uí Rinn
	L McLoughlin 0-6, I Walsh 1-1, A O'Keeffe 1-1, L O'Neill 0-2, A Walsh 0-2, M Healy 0-1, J Healy 0-1, J Browne 0-1.		A Cagney 0-4, J O'Brien 0-4, A O'Connor 1-0, P Gammell 1-0, D O'Flynn 0-2, B Dennehy 0-2.

29 September 2012 Semi-final	Kilworth	2-14 - 0-16	Argideen Rangers	Páirc Uí Rinn
	A Mannix 1-8, N McNamara 1-0, L Whelan 0-2, N Byrne 0-2, P Lynch 0-2.		M Walsh 0-9, M O'Callaghan 0-3, C O'Brien 0-2, B Hennessy 0-1, J Sheehan 0-1.

=== Final ===
14 October 2012 Final	Kilworth	2-15 - 2-13	Kanturk	Páirc Uí Rinn
	A Mannix 0-8 (0-5 frees), N McNamara 1-3, P Lynch 1-1, B Tobin 0-2, N Byrne 0-1.	Report	I Walsh 1-2, L McLoughlin 0-5 (0-3 frees), M Healy 1-0, L O’Neill 0-2, A Walsh, J McLoughlin, J Browne and A Nash (free) 0-1 each.	Referee: C McAllister (Aghada)

== Championship statistics ==
=== Top scorers ===
Overall

Rank	Player	Club	Tally	Total	Matches	Average
1	Adrian Mannix	Kilworth	2-31	37	4	9.25
2	Michael Walsh	Argideen Rangers	2-26	32	5	6.40
3	Lorcán McLoughlin	Kanturk	1-28	31	6	5.16
4	Brian Cashman	Blackrock	0-27	27	4	6.75
5	Trevor O'Keeffe	Aghada	1-21	24	3	8.00
5	John Dineen	Éire Óg	0-24	24	4	6.00
6	Pádraig Lynch	Kilworth	4-09	21	4	5.25
6	John Forrest	Meelin	0-21	21	4	5.25
7	Ger O'Leary	Fr. O'Neill's	1-17	20	3	6.66
7	Andrew O'Shaughnessy	Dromina	1-17	20	4	5.00
8	Paul Gammell	Charleville	1-14	17	4	4.25
8	Aidan Walsh	Kanturk	0-17	17	6	2.83

In a single game

Rank	Player	Club	Tally	Total	Opposition
1	Seánie O'Connell	Milford	0-12	12	Blackrock
2	Adrian Mannix	Kilworth	1-08	11	Argideen Rangers
2	Trevor O'Keeffe	Aghada	0-11	11	Blackrock
2	Henry O'Gorman	Milford	0-11	11	Meelin
3	Michael O'Brien	Argideen Rangers	2-04	10	Dripsey
3	Lorcán McLoughlin	Kanturk	1-07	10	Éire Óg
3	Ger O'Leary	Fr. O'Neill's	1-07	10	Éire Óg
4	Adrian Mannix	Kilworth	1-06	9	Dromina
4	Michael Walsh	Argideen Rangers	1-06	9	Meelin
4	Trevor O'Keeffe	Aghada	0-09	9	Fermoy
4	Brian Cashman	Blackrock	0-09	9	Aghada
4	Adrian Mannix	Kilworth	0-09	9	Fermoy
4	Michael Walsh	Argideen Rangers	0-09	9	Kilworth
