= 1988 Cork Intermediate Hurling Championship =

- Dates: 28 May 1988 – 16 October 1988
- Teams: 21
- Champions: Youghal (3rd title); Ger Motherway (captain)
- Runners-up: Kilbrittain; Finbarr Sheehy (captain)

Tournament statistics
- Matches played: 23
- Goals scored: 81 (3.52 per match)
- Points scored: 438 (19.04 per match)
- Top scorer(s): Seánie Ring (2-24)

The 1988 Cork Intermediate Hurling Championship was the 79th staging of the Cork Intermediate Hurling Championship since its establishment by the Cork County Board in 1909. The draw for the opening round fixtures took place on 13 December 1987. The championship began on 28 May 1988 and ended on 16 October 1988.

On 16 October 1988, Youghal won the championship following a 4–06 to 2–11 defeat of Kilbrittain in the final at Páirc Uí Chaoimh. This was their third championship title overall and their first title since 1969.

Youghal's Seánie Ring was the championship's top scorer with 2-24.

== Results ==
=== First round ===
28 May 1988 First round	Cloyne	1-13 - 2-15	Inniscarra	Church Road
	Joe Lewis 0-7, P Cahill 1-1, T O'Sullivan 0-3, John Lewis 0-1, G Lewis 0-1.		G Manley 0-8, S Griffin 1-0, M McDonnell 1-0, P Maher 0-3, D Holland 0-2, G Murphy 0-1, D Murphy 0-1.

28 May 1988 First round	Douglas	3-08 - 0-03	Bandon	Páirc Liam Mhic Cárthaigh
	J Quirke 1-2, E Forde 1-1, P Lynch 1-0, P Daly 0-3, M Magner 0-1, A Sheedy 0-1.		P Crowley 0-2, J O'Donovan 0-1.

29 May 1988 First round	Bishopstown	1-18 - 4-08	Éire Óg	Blarney
	A O'Sullivan 0-10, T Keating 1-1, N Murphy 0-2, F O'Regan 0-2, N Crowley 0-1, C Coffey 0-1, M Coughlan 0-1.		M Kelleher 1-1, M Flynn 1-1, D Collins 1-1, J Leary 1-1, D Desmond 0-3, M Sheehan 0-1.

29 May 1988 First round	Ballymartle	2-11 - 3-13	Tracton	Ballinhassig
	M Fitzpatrick 1-6, J McCarthy 1-0, J O'Mahony 0-2, K McCarthy 0-2, M Allen 0-1.		J O'Callaghan 1-3, DJ Kiely 0-5, K Kingston 1-0, W O'Flynn 1-0, M Quinn 0-2, P O'Reilly 0-2, F Canty 0-1.

4 June 1988 First round	Glen Rovers	3-07 - 3-09	Newtownshandrum	Kanturk
	G O'Riordan 1-1, P O'Neill 1-1, D Cooper 1-0, P Barry 0-2, R O'Connor 0-1, T O'Neill 0-1, P Burke 0-1.		D Coughlan 1-6, J Linehan 1-1, D O'Riordan 1-0, J Ryan 0-1, M Thompson 0-1.

=== Second round ===
22 May 1988 Second round	Blackrock	1-09 - 1-09	St. Finbarr's	Ballinlough
	P Moylan 0-6, P O'Brien 1-0, T O'Mahony 0-2, B Thornhill 0-1.		V Twomey 1-3, M Kennedy 0-2, C McCarthy 0-2, J Hodgins 0-1, T Leahy 0-1.

28 May 1988 Second round	Youghal	1-11 - 1-09	St. Vincent's	St. Catherine's Park
	S Ring 1-7, M Walsh 0-2, M Butler 0-1, A O'Regan 0-1.		W Walsh 1-6, T Carney 0-2, R Feeney 0-1.

28 May 1988 Second round	Mayfield	1-07 - 1-13	Cobh	Carrigtwohill
	T Murray 1-0, D Crowley 0-3, J Coomey 0-2, K Hyland 0-1, J Nodwell 0-1.		P Kavanagh 0-6, G Morgan 1-2, B Frahill 0-3, E O'Connell 0-1, B Kearney 0-1.

29 May 1988 Second round	Mallow	1-09 - 2-09	Kilbrittain	Cloughduv
	D Murphy 1-1, R Sheehan 0-4, J Walsh 0-2, J Hayes 0-1, PJ Stokes 0-1.		C O'Connell 1-1, P Hunt 1-0, T Brennan 0-3, D O'Connell 0-2, D O'Neill 0-2, F Sheehy 0-1.

11 June 1988 Second round	Ballinhassig	2-07 - 1-12	St. Catherine's	Riverstown Sportsfield
	S McCarthy 1-3, J O'Mahony 1-2, P Cussen 0-1, D Lombard 0-1.		C Clancy 0-7, S Buckley 1-0, P O'Donoghue 0-2, M Mellerick 0-1, B O'Regan 0-1, C Casey 0-1.

12 June 1988 Second round	Bishopstown	2-07 - 0-10	Tracton	Riverstick
	A O'Sullivan 1-3, T Keating 1-0, C Coffey 0-1, F O'Regan 0-1, N Murphy 0-1, G McCarthy 0-1.		DJ Kiely 0-7, M Quinn 0-2, K Kingston 0-1.

17 June 1988 Second round replay	Blackrock	4-11 - 3-13	St. Finbarr's	Ballinlough
	P Moylan 1-8, B Thornhill 3-0, L Tobin 0-3.		P O'Shea 0-9, M Kennedy 1-2, K Keating 1-1, E Fitzpatrick 1-0, K McCarthy 0-1.

25 June 1988 Second round	Newtownshandrum	2-10 - 1-06	Passage	Fitzgerald Park
	D Coughlan 0-6, J Geary 1-0, Joe Ryan 1-0, Jim Ryan 0-1, D Herlihy 0-1, D O'Riordan 0-1, G Morrissey 0-1.		B Meade 1-5, K Harrington 0-1.

26 June 1988 Second round	Inniscarra	3-11 - 4-08	Douglas	Bishopstown
	G Manley 1-5, P Maher 1-0, S Griffin 1-0, D Holland 0-3, D Murphy 0-1, R Maher 0-1, M McDonnell 0-1.		P Walsh 2-3, P Lynch 1-2, T Hurley 1-0, D O'Leary 0-2, D Walsh 0-1.

23 July 1988 Second round replay	Inniscarra	1-14 - 3-09	Douglas	Bishopstown
	G Manley 0-10, J Feeney 1-1, D Murphy 0-1, B O'Donoghue 0-1, P O'Connell 0-1.		P Walsh 0-5, P Lynch 0-4, M Magner 1-0, E Forde 1-0, T Hurley 1-0.

=== Quarter-finals ===
23 July 1988 Quarter-final	Kilbrittain	2-09 - 1-09	Newtownshandrum	Blarney
	D O'Connell 2-3, T Brennan 0-3, P Hunt 0-1, C O'Connell 0-1, T McCarthy 0-1.		D Coughlan 0-4, D O'Riordan 1-0, J Ryan 0-1, J Geary 0-1, L Bowles 0-1, J Coughlan 0-1, D Herlihy 0-1.

24 July 1988 Quarter-final	Cobh	1-08 - 4-09	St. Catherine's	Carrigtwohill
	M Meaney 1-0, G Morgan 0-3, P Kavanagh 0-3, B Frahill 0-1, S Looney 0-1.		S Buckley 2-1, C Clancy 0-6, B O'Regan 1-0, J Mangan 1-0, P O'Donoghue 0-2.

24 July 1988 Quarter-final	Youghal	2-11 - 2-05	Blackrock	Páirc Uí Chonaill
	S Ring 0-5, P Grace 1-1, G Motherway 1-0, M Walsh 0-3, V O'Shea 0-1, T O'Connell 0-1.		P Moylan 1-2, M Lyons 1-0, L Tobin 0-1, A O'Mahony 0-1, K O'Keeffe 0-1.

7 August 1988 Quarter-final	Douglas	1-13 - 2-07	Bishopstown	Church Road
	P Walsh 1-4, P Lynch 0-4, D Hurley 0-2, E Forde 0-1, M O'Regan 0-1, M Maguire 0-1.		G McCarthy 1-1, N Crowley 1-1, T O'Sullivan 0-3, C Coffey 0-1, L Touhy 0-1.

=== Semi-finals ===
27 August 1988 Semi-final	Youghal	1-11 - 0-14	St. Catherine's	Páirc Lios gCúl
	S Ring 0-6, T O'Connell 1-2, T Coyne 0-1, M Butler 0-1, M McCarthy 0-1.		C Clancy 0-7, C Casey 0-2, M Mellerick 0-2, D Walsh 0-1, B O'Regan 0-1.

28 August 1988 Semi-final	Kilbrittain	1-10 - 0-05	Douglas	Minane Bridge
	T Brennan 0-4, D O'Neill 1-0, D O'Connell 0-3, T Sheehan 0-1, T McCarthy 0-1, D Healy 0-1.		P Lynch 0-2, D O'Leary 0-2, D Larkin 0-1.

25 September 1988 Semi-final replay	Youghal	1-09 - 0-02	St. Catherine's	Páirc Lios gCúl
	T Coyne 1-1, S Ring 0-4, M McCarthy 0-2, M Walsh 0-1, M Butler 0-1.		P Clancy 0-1, C Casey 0-1.

=== Final ===
16 October 1988 Final	Youghal	4-06 - 2-11	Kilbrittain	Páirc Uí Chaoimh
	T Coyne 1-2, S Ring 1-2, T O'Connell 1-1, M Butler 1-0, M Walsh 0-1.		C O'Connell 1-2, J O'Sullivan 1-0, D Healy 0-3, D O'Connell 0-3, T Sheehan 0-1, T Brennan 0-1, D O'Neill 0-1.

== Championship statistics ==
=== Top scorers ===
Overall

Rank	Player	Club	Tally	Total	Matches	Average
1	Seánie Ring	Youghal	2-24	30	5	6.00
2	Ger Manley	Inniscarra	1-23	26	3	8.66
3	Pat Moylan	Blackrock	2-16	22	3	7.33
4	Pat Walsh	Douglas	3-12	21	3	7.00
5	Christy Clancy	St. Catherine's	0-20	20	4	5.00
6	Donal Coughlan	Newtownshandrum	1-16	19	3	6.33
7	Paul Lynch	Douglas	2-12	18	5	3.60
8	Dan O'Connell	Kilbrittain	2-11	17	4	4.25
9	Anthony O'Sullivan	Bishopstown	1-13	16	2	8.00
10	D. J. Kiely	Tracton	0-12	12	2	6.00

In a single game

Rank	Player	Club	Tally	Total	Opposition
1	Pat Moylan	Blackrock	1-08	11	St. Finbarr's
2	Seánie Ring	Youghal	1-07	10	St. Vincent's
2	Ger Manley	Inniscarra	0-10	10	Douglas
2	Anthony O'Sullivan	Bishopstown	0-10	10	Éire Óg
5	Bobby Thornhill	Blackrock	3-00	9	St. Finbarr's
5	Pat Walsh	Douglas	2-03	9	Inniscarra
5	Dan O'Connell	Kilbrittain	2-03	9	Newtownshandrum
5	Martin Fitzpatrick	Ballymartle	1-06	9	Tracton
5	Donal Coughlan	Newtownshandrum	1-06	9	Glen Rovers
5	Willie Walsh	St. Vincent's	1-06	9	Youghal
5	Paudie O'Shea	St. Finbarr's	0-09	9	Blackrock
