= 1969 Cork Intermediate Hurling Championship =

Irish hurling competition

- Date: 20 April - 28 September 1969
- Teams: 16
- Champions: Youghal (2nd title); Pat Hegarty (captain)
- Runners-up: Cobh

Tournament statistics
- Matches played: 16
- Goals scored: 87 (5.44 per match)
- Points scored: 237 (14.81 per match)

The 1969 Cork Intermediate Hurling Championship was the 60th staging of the Cork Intermediate Hurling Championship since its establishment by the Cork County Board in 1909. The draw for the opening round fixtures took place on 26 January 1969. The championship ran from 20 April to 28 September 1969.

The final was played on 28 September 1969 at the Castlemarty Grounds, between Youghal and Cobh, in what was their first ever meeting in the final. Youghal won the match by 3-07 to 0-13 to claim their second championship title overall and a first title in 14 years.

== Results ==
=== First round ===
20 April 1969 First round	Midleton	5-02 - 4-05	Tracton	Cork Athletic Grounds
	D O'Reilly 2-0, S Roche 1-0, J O'Brien 1-0, M McCarthy 1-0, P Fitzgerald 0-2.		S Kelly 3-2, R Cronin 1-1, M Collins 0-1, J Cremin 0-1.

20 April 1969 First round	Carrigaline	2-06 - 5-06	Cloyne	Páirc Séamus de Barra

27 April 1969 First round	Youghal	5-09 - 1-08	Ballincollig	Páirc Uí Chonaill
	F Keane 2-4, J Griffin 1-0, F Cooper 1-0, M Hodnett 0-3, N Gallagher 0-1, R Sullivan 0-1.		J Fitton 1-2, J Sheehy 0-2, A Twomey 0-2, J Regann0-2.

27 April 1969 First round	Castletownroche	2-03 - 3-08	Mallow	Kildorrery Grounds
	P O'Brien 1-0, D O'Keeffe 1-0, D Kent 0-1, R Browne 0-1, J Walsh 0-1.		B Barrett 2-0, T Sheehan 0-5, K Sheehan 1-0, M Blake 0-1, S McAuliffe 0-1, M Sheehan 0-1.

4 May 1969 First round	Shamrocks	2-10 - 6-08	Kilworth	Clonmult Memorial Grounds
	G Hanley 1-7, J Twomey 1-0, R Sisk 0-3.		P O'Mahony 2-0, P Ferran 2-0, K Casey 1-2, M O'Loughlin 1-1, F Sheedy 0-4, D O'Riordan 0-1.

4 May 1969 First round	Nemo Rangers	2-14 - 4-00	Carrigtwohill	Clonmult Memorial Grounds
	J Cooke 1-2, B Cogan 0-5, G Allen 1-0, B Morgan 0-3, D Kelly 0-2, J O'Leary 0-1, D Murph 0-1.		D O'Keeffe 2-0, P O'Connor 1-0, P O'Brien 1-0.

4 May 1969 First round	Ballinhassig	4-05 - 4-08	Newtownshandrum	Bishop Casey Memorial Park

11 May 1969 First round	Cobh	5-10 - 3-08	Glen Rovers	Páirc Séamus de Barra
	P Meade 3-2, J Ryan 1-1, W O'Connor 1-0, S Butler 0-3, S O'Connor 0-1, P Leary 0-1, T Meaney 0-1, F Cummins 0-1.		K Houlihan 2-2, W O'Connell 1-0, D O'Neill 0-3, D Lynch 0-2, E Buckley 0-1.

2 June 1969 First round replay	Midleton	4-07 - 1-06	Tracton	Carrigaline Grounds
	M McCarthy 2-2, W Cody 1-4, J Roche 1-0, T O'Mahony 0-1.		S Kelly 1-3, M Collins 0-1, T Cronin 0-1, D Walsh 0-1.

=== Quarter-finals ===
1 June 1969 Quarter-final	Cobh	1-07 - 2-02	Newtownshandrum	Páirc Mac Gearailt
	F Cummins 1-2, T Meaney 0-2, S O'Connor 0-2, S Butler 0-1.		P Morrissey 1-1, C Morrissey 1-0, A Noonan 0-1.

6 July 1969 Quarter-final	Kilworth	1-08 - 2-04	Nemo Rangers	Páirc Séamus de Barra

13 July 1969 Quarter-final	Youghal	5-07 - 2-06	Midleton	Castlemartyr Grounds
	W Walsh 2-0, F Keane 1-3, S O'Leary 1-1, F Cooper 1-0, P Hegarty 0-1, M Hodnett 0-1, W Ryan 0-1.		P Fitzgerald 0-4, P O'Mahony 1-0, M McCarthy 1-0, S Farrell 0-1, D Horgan 0-1.

20 July 1969 Quarter-final	Cloyne	3-09 - 1-10	Mallow	Páirc Mac Gearailt

=== Semi-finals ===
17 August 1969 Semi-final	Youghal	1-17 - 2-06	Kilworth	Cork Athletic Grounds
				Referee: W Walsh (Mayfield)

29 August 1969 Semi-final	Cobh	1-12 - 1-06	Cloyne	Clonmult Memorial Grounds
	T Meaney 0-7, P Meade 1-0, S Butler 0-2, S O'Connor 0-1, D O'Brien 0-1, J Carroll 0-1, P Leahy 0-1.		D Motherway 1-0, D Daly 0-3, B Aherne 0-1, M O'Brien 0-1, D Clifford 0-1.

=== Final ===
28 September 1969 Final	Youghal	3-07 - 0-13	Cobh	Castlemarty Grounds
	F Cooper 2-0, S O'Leary 1-1, F Keane 0-2, N Gallagher 0-2, M Hodnett 0-1, R O'Sullivan 0-1.		F Cummins 0-5, P Meath 0-4, T Meaney 0-3, S Butler 0-1.	Referee: F Murphy (Blackrock)
