= 1967 Cork Intermediate Hurling Championship =

Irish hurling competition

- Dates: 2 April – 8 October 1967
- Teams: 17
- Champions: Ballincollig (6th title); Aubie Twomey (captain)
- Runners-up: Cobh; Mick Aherne (captain)

Tournament statistics
- Matches played: 18
- Goals scored: 114 (6.33 per match)
- Points scored: 259 (14.39 per match)

The 1967 Cork Intermediate Hurling Championship was the 58th staging of the Cork Intermediate Hurling Championship since its establishment by the Cork County Board in 1909. The draw for the opening round fixtures took place on 29 January 1967. The championship ran from 2 April to 8 October 1967.

The final was played on 8 October 1967 at the Athletic Grounds in Cork, between Ballincollig and Youghal, in what was their first ever meeting in the final. Ballincollig won the match by 3-08 to 3-07 to claim their sixth championship title overall and a first title in 28 years.

== Team changes ==
=== To Championship ===
Promoted from the Cork Junior Hurling Championship

- Carrigtwohill
- Rathluirc

=== From Championship ===
Promoted to the Cork Senior Hurling Championship

- Cloyne

Regraded to the Cork Junior Hurling Championship

- Bandon
- Castlemaryr
- Sarsfields

== Results ==
=== First round ===
7 May 1967 First round	Castletownroche	5-05 - 2-04	Tracton	Cork Athletic Grounds

=== Second round ===
2 April 1967 Second round	Ballymartle	3-04 - 3-06	Nemo Rangers	Manning Park

16 April 1967 Second round	Ballincollig	2-07 - 3-04	Rathluirc	Bishop Casey Memorial Park
	BW Fitton 1-1, S Barry-Murphy 1-0, T Murphy 0-3, T Sheehan 0-2, D Forde 0-1.		D Forde 2-0, T O'Grady 1-1, M O'Toole 0-2, K O'Shea 0-1.

30 April 1967 Second round	Youghal	1-06 - 2-02	Shamrocks	Páirc Uí Chonaill

14 May 1967 Second round	Ballinhassig	3-03 - 5-06	St Vincent's	Tracton Grounds

21 May 1967 Second round	Mallow	1-07 - 7-06	Midleton	Riverstown Sportsfield

21 May 1967 Second round	Carrigaline	6-06 - 2-05	Éire Óg	Douglas Grounds

11 June 1967 Second round replay	Ballincollig	2-15 - 3-02	Rathluirc	Bishop Casey Memorial Park
	J Holmes 2-0, T Murphy 0-5, J O'Regan 0-5, B Fitton 0-3, D Forde 0-2.		M O'Toole 2-0, K O'Shea 1-0, T O'Grady 0-1, J Madigan 0-1.

25 June 1967 Second round	Glen Rovers	6-08 - 7-05	Carrigtwohill	Cork Athletic Grounds

9 July 1967 Second round replay	Glen Rovers	4-09 - 1-10	Carrigtwohill	Cork Athletic Grounds

9 July 1967 Second round	Castletownroche	1-04 - 4-21	Cobh	Clonmult Memorial Park

=== Quarter-finals ===
25 June 1967 Quarter-final	Midleton	4-12 - 5-07	Youghal	Castlemartyr Grounds
	T O'Mahony 2-2, D O'Brien 1-1, W Flanagan 1-0, W Cody 0-3, P Fitzgerald 0-2, P O'Brien 0-2, R O'Connor 0-1, B Lordan 0-1.		S Cooper 2-1, L Leahy 2-0, P Hegarty 0-5, F Keane 1-0, M Hodnett 0-1.

23 July 1967 Quarter-final	Cobh	4-14 - 3-04	Nemo Rangers	Riverstown Sportsfield
	D O'Brien 1-4, T Meaney 1-3, S Burke 1-1, J O'Connell 1-0, P Leahy 0-3, S Butler 0-3.		B Morgan 2-2, J McCarthy 1-1, F Cogan 0-1.

30 July 1967 Quarter-final	Ballincollig	4-10 - 0-07	St Vincent's	Cork Athletic Grounds
	J Holmes 2-0, G O'Regan 0-7, T Dwyer 1-1, M Madden 1-1, D Forde 0-1.		N Barry 0-5, C O'Shea 0-1, T O'Shea 0-1.

30 July 1967 Quarter-final	Glen Rovers	5-08 - 1-07	Carrigaline	Tracton Grounds
	A O'Flynn 2-1, D O'Driscoll 1-2, R O'Connell 1-1, JJ Kelly 1-0, P Murphy 0-3, M O'Halloran 0-1.		T Murphy 1-4, C Cooney 0-1, D Drinan 0-1, J Calnan 0-1.

=== Semi-finals ===
13 August 1967 Semi-final	Ballincollig	3-09 - 4-01	Glen Rovers	Ballinhassig Grounds
	J Holmes 1-2, G O'Regan 0-5, D Forde 1-1, T Dunne 1-0, J Sheehan 0-1.		P Murphy 1-1, S Riordan 1-0, JJ Kelly 1-0, D Driscoll 1-0.

20 August 1967 Semi-final	Cobh	1-12 - 1-08	Midleton	Carrigtwohill Grounds
	T Meaney 1-4, S Butler 0-2, J Carroll 0-2, J Ryan 0-1, P Leahy 0-1, J Aherne 0-1, M Meaney 0-1.		D O'Brien 0-4, P O'Brien 1-0, B Cody 0-2, L Harty 0-1, P Fitzgerald 0-1.

=== Final ===
8 October 1967 Final	Ballincollig	3-08 - 3-07	Cobh	Cork Athletic Grounds
	G O'Regan 1-5, J Holmes 2-1, T Dwyer 0-2.		J Burke 2-0, D O'Brien 1-0, T Meaney 0-2, J Ryan 0-2, M Meaney 0-1, S Butler 0-1, P Leahy 0-1.
