= 1958 Cork Intermediate Hurling Championship =

Irish hurling competition

- Dates: 20 April - 19 October 1958
- Teams: 13
- Champions: Glen Rovers (5th title); T. O'Leary (captain)
- Runners-up: Rathluirc

The 1958 Cork Intermediate Hurling Championship was the 49th staging of the Cork Intermediate Hurling Championship since its establishment by the Cork County Board in 1909. The draw for the opening round fixtures took place on 26 January 1958. The championship ran from 20 April to 19 October 1958.

Glen Rovers entered the championship as the defending champions.

The final was played on 19 October 1958 at Bishop Casey Memorial Park in Mallow, between Glen Rovers and Charleville, in what was their first ever meeting in the final. Glen Rovers won the match by 5–09 to 3–06 to claim their fifth championship title overall and a record-breaking third title in succession.

== Results ==
=== Quarter-finals ===
29 June 1958 Quarter-final	Tracton	3-09 - 3-09	Carrigaine	Manning Park

29 June 1958 Quarter-final	Newtownshandrum	2-07 - 3-06	Rathluirc	Buttevant Grounds

29 June 1958 Quarter-final	Sarsfields	2-04 - 4-08	Glen Rovers	Cork Athletic Grounds

16 July 1958 Quarter-final	St Finbarr's	5-02 - 4-04	St Vincent's	The Mardyke

3 August 1958 Quarter-final replay	Tracton	0-03 - 3-08	Carrigaine	Manning Park

=== Semi-finals ===
27 July 1958 Semi-final	Rathluirc	4-07 - 3-03	St Finbarr's	Bishop Casey Memorial Park

7 September 1958 Semi-final	Glen Rovers	3-07 - 3-04	Carrigaline	Cork Athletic Grounds

=== Final ===
19 October 1958 Final	Glen Rovers	5-09 - 3-06	Rathluirc	Bishop Casey Memorial Park
