= 1939 Cork Intermediate Hurling Championship =

Irish hurling competition

- Date: 23 April – 13 August 1939
- Teams: 9
- Champions: Ballincollig (5th title); Willie Murphy (captain)
- Runners-up: Ballinora; J. O'Connor (captain)

Tournament statistics
- Matches played: 7
- Goals scored: 41 (5.86 per match)
- Points scored: 49 (7 per match)

The 1939 Cork Intermediate Hurling Championship was the 30th staging of the Cork Intermediate Hurling Championship since its establishment by the Cork County Board in 1909. The draw for the opening round fixtures took place on 29 January 1939. The championship ran from 23 April to 13 August 1939.

The final was played on 13 August 1939 at the Mardyke in Cork, between Ballincollig and Ballinora, in what was their first ever meeting in the final. Ballincollig won the match by 4–06 to 4–02 to claim their fifth championship title overall and a first championship title in four years.

== Results ==
=== First round ===
| 23 April 1939 First round | Ballinora | 2-06 - 3-03 | Fr. Matthew Hall | Ballincollig Sportsfield |

| 23 April 1939 First round | Douglas | 1-03 - 2-02 (declared void) | Brian Dillons | The Mardyke |

| 30 April 1939 First round | Éire Óg | 2-08 - 7-00 | Ballincollig | Coachford Sportsfield |

| 7 May 1939 First round | St. Finbarr's | 1-02 - 4-03 | Buttevant | Cork Athletic Grounds |

| 21 May 1939 First round replay | Ballinora | 3-02 - 2-02 | Fr. Matthew Hall | Ballincollig Sportsfield |

- Lough Rovers received a bye in this round.

=== Second round ===
| 21 May 1939 Second round | Lough Rovers | 1-00 - 2-06 (declared void) | Buttevant | Doneraile Sportsfield |

=== Semi-finals ===
| 9 July 1939 Semi-final | Ballinora | 2-02 - 2-01 | Douglas | The Mardyke |

| 23 July 1939 Semi-final | Ballincollig | 4-05 - 1-07 | Lough Rovers | The Mardyke |

=== Final ===
| 13 August 1939 Final | Ballincollig | 4-06 – 4-02 | Ballinora | The Mardyke |

== Championship statistics ==
=== Miscellaneous ===
- Brian Dillons and Buttevant were eliminated from the championship, in spite of winning their opening games, after objections from the defeated teams were upheld by the County Board.
