= 1959 Cork Intermediate Hurling Championship =

Irish hurling competition

- Dates: 12 April - 13 September 1959
- Teams: 14
- Champions: Mallow (2nd title); Barry Nagle (captain)
- Runners-up: St. Vincent's

The 1959 Cork Intermediate Hurling Championship was the 50th staging of the Cork Intermediate Hurling Championship since its establishment by the Cork County Board in 1909. The draw for the opening round fixtures took place at the Cork Convention on 25 January 1959. The championship ran from 12 April to 13 September 1959.

On 13 September 1959, Mallow won the championship following a 2–08 to 3–03 defeat of St. Vincent's in the final. This was their second championship title overall and a first title in 36 years.

== Results ==
=== Quarter-finals ===
28 June 1959 Quarter-final	Tracton	4-07 - 3-08	Carrigaline	Manning Park

5 July 1959 Quarter-final	Mallow	3-11 - 5-02	Sarsfields	Cork Athletic Grounds

19 July 1959 Quarter-final	Midleton	3-07 - 4-10	St. Vincent's	Cork Athletic Grounds

16 August 1959 Quarter-final	Rathluirc	2-11 - 2-05	Passage	Cork Athletic Grounds

=== Semi-finals ===
30 August 1959 Semi-final	Mallow	4-09 – 2-12	Rathluirc	Buttevant Grounds

30 August 1959 Semi-final	St. Vincent's	4-13 – 2-04	Tracton	Carrigaline Grounds

=== Final ===
13 September 1959 Final	Mallow	2-08 – 3-03	St. Vincent's	Cork Athletic Grounds
	J Donoghue 1-2, T Moynihan 1-0, L Sheehan 0-2, B Nagle 0-2, J Murphy 0-1, D Buckley 0-1.		H O'Mahony 1-1, B O'Neill 1-0, J Coughlan 1-0, P O'Rourke 0-1, B O'Shea 0-1.
