= 1980 Cork Intermediate Hurling Championship =

Irish hurling competition

- Dates: 11 May 1980 – 24 August 1980
- Teams: 17
- Champions: Ballyhea (3rd title); Jack Russell (captain)
- Runners-up: Mallow; Paul Redmond (captain)

Tournament statistics
- Matches played: 16
- Goals scored: 67 (4.19 per match)
- Points scored: 308 (19.25 per match)

The 1980 Cork Intermediate Hurling Championship was the 71st staging of the Cork Intermediate Hurling Championship since its establishment by the Cork County Board in 1909. The draw for the opening round fixtures took place on 3 February 1980. The championship began on 11 May 1980 and ended on 24 August 1980.

On 24 August 1980, Ballyhea won the championship following a 0–15 to 1–10 defeat of Mallow in the final at Fr. Con Buckley Park. This was their third championship title overall and their first title since 1944.

== Team changes ==
=== To Championship ===
Promoted from the Cork Junior Hurling Championship

- Tracton

Upgraded from the East Cork Junior A Hurling Championship

- Erin's Own

== Results ==
=== First round ===
8 June 1980 First round	Carrigtwohill	3-15 - 3-08	Blackrock	Riverstown Sportsfield

=== Second round ===
11 May 1980 Second round	Tracton	2-12 - 3-08	Newtownshandrum	Páirc Uí Chaoimh

11 May 1980 Second round	Cloughduv	2-12 - 2-06	Passage	Páirc Uí Chaoimh

16 May 1980 Second round	Watergrasshill	3-09 - 1-04	Mayfield	Riverstown Sportsfield

18 May 1980 Second round	Glen Rovers	2-04 - 0-16	Ballyhea	Páirc Uí Chaoimh

18 May 1980 Second round	Erin's Own	3-10 - 1-10	Inniscarra	Ballinlough

1 June 1980 Second round	St. Finbarr's	2-06 - 0-06	Ballinhassig	Crosshaven

14 June 1980 Second round	Bishopstown	3-06 - 0-17	St. Vincent's	Ballinlough

15 June 1980 Second round	Mallow	3-07 - 2-07	Carrigtwohill	Blarney

=== Quarter-finals ===
28 June 1980 Quarter-final	Mallow	5-13 - 0-07	St. Vincent's	Watergrasshill

29 June 1980 Quarter-final	Cloughduv	5-21 - 0-05	Watergrasshill	Páirc Uí Chaoimh

29 June 1980 Quarter-final	St. Finbarr's	5-09 - 2-09	Tracton	Ballygarvan

29 June 1980 Quarter-final	Ballyhea	2-13 - 1-09	Erin's Own	Glanworth

=== Semi-finals ===
9 August 1980 Semi-final	Mallow	5-09 - 3-04	St. Finbarr's	Castletownroche
	P Buckley 0-8, J Hayes 2-0, T Coakley 1-0, P Hayes 1-0, D Murphy 1-0, J Browne 0-1.		J Meyler 1-1, S Dillon 1-0, F O'Mahony 1-0, J O'Shea 0-1, C Roche 0-1, C Myers 0-1.

10 August 1980 Semi-final	Ballyhea	1-14 - 2-07	Cloughduv	Bishop Casey Memorial Park
	D Ryan 1-8, J Ryan 1-0, D Sullivan 0-2, W Shanahan 0-2, D Flynn 0-1, K McSweeney 0-1.		C Kelly 2-2, N Dunne 0-2, D O'Leary 0-1, J Grainger 0-1, D Walsh 0-1.

=== Final ===
24 August 1980 Final	Ballyhea	0-15 - 1-10	Mallow	Fr. Con Buckley Park
	D Ryan 0-6, W Shanahan 0-6, P Ryan 0-2, JK Sweeney 0-1.		P Buckley 0-8, J Hayes 1-0, T Coakley 0-1, D Murphy 0-1.	Referee: W Horgan (Brian Dillons)
