= 1917 Cork Intermediate Hurling Championship =

Irish hurling competition

- Champions: Emmets (1st title); Donal McDonald (captain)
- Runners-up: Aghabullogue

The 1917 Cork Intermediate Hurling Championship was the ninth staging of the Cork Intermediate Hurling Championship since its establishment by the Cork County Board in 1909.

The final was played on 12 May 1918 at the Athletic Grounds in Cork, between Emmets and Aghabullogue, in what was their first ever meeting in the final. Emmets won the match by 5–01 to 5–00 to claim their first ever championship title.

== Results ==
=== Final ===
12 May 1918 Final	Emmets	5-01 - 5-00	Aghabullogue	Cork Athletic Grounds
