= 1955 Cork Intermediate Hurling Championship =

Irish hurling competition

- Champions: Youghal (1st title); Joe Maloney (captain)
- Runners-up: Mallow

The 1955 Cork Intermediate Hurling Championship was the 46th staging of the Cork Intermediate Hurling Championship since its establishment by the Cork County Board in 1909.

The final was played on 23 October 1955 at Fermoy Sportsfield, between Youghal and Mallow, in what was their first ever meeting in the final. Youghal won the match by 4–06 to 2–05 to claim their first ever championship title.

== Results ==
=== Final ===
| 23 October 1955 Final | Youghal | 4-06 - 2-05 | Mallow | Páirc Mhic Gearailt |
