= 1934 Cork Intermediate Hurling Championship =

Irish hurling competition

- Champions: Ballincollig (3rd title)
- Runners-up: Kinsale

The 1934 Cork Intermediate Hurling Championship was the 25th staging of the Cork Intermediate Hurling Championship since its establishment by the Cork County Board in 1909.

The final was played on 25 November 1934 at the Athletic Grounds in Douglas, between Ballincollig and Kinsale, in what was their first ever meeting in the final. Ballincollig won the match by 3–03 to 2–03 to claim their third championship title overall and a first championship title in five years.

== Results ==
=== Final ===
25 November 1934 Final	Ballincollig	3-03 – 2-03	Kinsale	Douglas Athletic Grounds
