= Cork Intermediate A Hurling Championship =

Irish sporting competition

- Current season or competition: 2026 Cork Intermediate A Hurling Championship
- Irish: Craobh Iomána Idirmhéanach A Chorcaí
- Code: Hurling
- Founded: 1909; 117 years ago
- Region: Cork (GAA)
- Trophy: Paddy Walsh Cup
- No. of teams: 12
- Title holders: Bandon (4th title)
- Most titles: Ballincollig (8 titles)
- Sponsors: Co-Op Superstores
- Official website: Official website

The Cork Intermediate A Hurling Championship (known for sponsorship reasons as the Co-Op Superstores Cork Intermediate A Hurling Championship and abbreviated to the Cork IAHC) is an annual hurling competition organised by the Cork County Board of the Gaelic Athletic Association and contested by the second tier intermediate clubs in the county of Cork in Ireland. It is the fourth tier overall in the entire Cork hurling championship system.

The Cork Intermediate Championship was introduced in 1909 as a competition that would bridge the gap between the senior grade and the junior grade. At the time of its creation it was the second tier of Cork hurling.

In its current format, the Cork Intermediate A Championship begins in July. The 12 participating club teams are drawn into three groups of four teams and play each other in a round-robin system. The three group winners and the three runners-up proceed to the knockout phase that culminates with the final match at Páirc Uí Rinn. The winner of the Cork Intermediate Championship, as well as being presented with the Paddy Walsh Cup, gains automatic promotion to the Cork Premier Intermediate Championship for the following season.

The competition has been won by 59 teams. Ballincollig are the most successful team in the tournament's history, having won it 8 times. Bandon are the title holders, defeating Aghada by 0–25 to 2–18 in the 2026 final.

== History ==
The Cork Intermediate Hurling Championship dates back to 1909, however, in 2003 it was decided to split the grade into Premier Intermediate and ordinary Intermediate. In its inaugural year in 2004, the Premier Intermediate grade was confined to sixteen clubs while the lowest ranked intermediate teams from 2003 were joined by the Junior Championship winners as well as the individual divisional winners - Argideen Rangers, Kanturk, Carrigaline, Blackrock and Watergrasshill. Grenagh, who won the Muskerry division in the junior grade, declined the invitation. In earlier years the winners of both the Premier Intermediate and Intermediate grades would have a play-off to decide which team would represent Cork in the Munster Intermediate Club Hurling Championship. In recent years the provincial place has been reserved for the Premier Intermediate champions.

== Format ==
=== Historic ===
From the inaugural championship in 1909 until 1999, a straight knockout format was used whereby once a team lost they were eliminated from the championship. The introduction of a "back door" system at inter-county level in the All-Ireland Championship in 1997 lead to the idea of introducing a second chance for defeated teams at county level. In 2000 a double-elimination format was introduced which afforded all club teams a second chance by remaining in the championship after a first-round defeat. In the two decades that followed the championship format continued to evolve with a number of minor tweaks. The provision of a second chance for defeated teams was later expanded to allow teams the opportunity of being defeated twice and still remain in the championship. Relegation was introduced in 2006, with Nemo Rangers becoming the first team to be relegated that year. Prior to this teams were allowed to decide for themselves if they wanted to regrade or retain their intermediate status.

=== Current ===
==== Development ====
On 2 April 2019, a majority of 136 club delegates voted to restructure the championship once again. The new format also lead to a reduction in the number of participating clubs from 16 to 12. The COVID-19 pandemic resulted in the new format being curtailed in its inaugural season, with the preliminary quarter-finals being abolished. This subsequently became a permanent decision.

==== Overview ====
Group stage: The 12 club teams are divided into three groups of four. Over the course of the group stage, which features one game in April and two games in August, each team plays once against the others in the group, resulting in each team being guaranteed at least three games. Two points are awarded for a win, one for a draw and zero for a loss. The teams are ranked in the group stage table by points gained, then scoring difference and then their head-to-head record. The top two teams in each group qualify for the knockout stage, with the two best-placed teams receiving byes to the semi-finals.

Quarter-finals: Two lone quarter-finals feature the four lowest-placed team from the group stage. Two teams qualify for the next round.

Semi-finals: The two semi-finals feature four teams. Two teams qualify for the next round.

Final: The two semi-final winners contest the final. The winning team are declared champions and gain automatic promotion to the following year's Cork Premier Intermediate Championship.

== Teams ==
=== 2027 teams ===
The 12 teams due to compete in the 2027 Cork Intermediate A Hurling Championship are:

Team	Location	Division	Colours	Position in 2026	In Championship since	Championship Titles	Last Championship Title
Aghada	Aghada	Imokilly	Green and white	Runners-Up	2022	1	2017
Ballygiblin	Mitchelstown	Avondhu	Red and white	Group stage	2023	0	—
Bishopstown	Bishopstown	Seandún	Maroon and white	Premier Intermediate relegated	2027	1	1992
Blackrock	Blackrock	Seandún	Green and yellow	Group stage	2021	1	2019
Erin's Own	Caherlag	Imokilly	Red and blue	Group stage	2024	2	1987
Kilbrittain	Kilbrittain	Carbery	Green and white	Group stage	2026	2	2010
Kildorrery	Kildorrery	Avondhu	Blue and white	Group stage	2013	0	—
Kilshannig	Glantane	Avondhu	Blue and gold	Premier Junior champions	2027	0	—
Mallow	Mallow	Avondhu	Red and yellow	Quarter-finals	2026	3	1972
Midleton	Midleton	Imokilly	Black and white	Semi-finals	2016	3	1978
Sarsfields	Glanmire	Imokilly	Blue, white and black	Semi-finals	2017	0	—
Youghal	Youghal	Imokilly	Maroon white and yellow	Quarter-finals	2023	4	1993

== Sponsorship ==
TSB Bank became the first title sponsor of the championship, serving in that capacity until 2005 when the Evening Echo signed a sponsorship deal. In 2020, Dairygold Co-Op Superstores were unveiled as the new title sponsor of the Cork Intermediate A Championship.

== The Cup ==
The winning team is presented with the Paddy Walsh Cup. Walsh was a native of Castlemartyr and served the club with distinction as a player, coach and administrator.

== List of Finals ==
=== List of Cork IAHC finals ===
Year	Winners		Runners-up		#
Year	Club	Score	Club	Score	#
2026	Bandon	0-25	Aghada	2-18	
2025	Aghabullogue	1-21	Bandon	0-23	
2024	Lisgoold	1-18, 2-18	Erin's Own	2-15, 2-13	
2023	Aghabullogue	3-17	Midleton	2-19	
2022	Dungourney	1-16	Cloughduv	0-13	
2021	Castlemartyr	1-19	Sarsfields	0-12	
2020	Éire Óg	2-16	Aghabullogue	1-17	
2019	Blackrock	0-15	Cloughduv	1-10	
2018	Ballincollig	2-16	Blackrock	1-15	
2017	Aghada	0-16	Éire Óg	0-09	
2016	Fr. O'Neill's	1-18	Kildorrery	1-14	
2015	Charleville	5-24	Dripsey	1-10	
2014	Fermoy	2-14	Charleville	1-16	
2013	Kanturk	2-22	Éire Óg	1-12	
2012	Kilworth	2-15	Kanturk	2-13	
2011	Bandon	2-14	Fr. O'Neill's	0-07	
2010	Kilbrittain	1-12	Ballygarvan	0-11	
2009	Valley Rovers	1-17	Kilworth	1-13	
2008	Carrigaline	1-13	Bandon	0-10	
2007	Fr. O'Neill's	1-13	Bandon	0-15	
2006	Ballymartle	1-23	Carrigaline	1-19	
2005	Argideen Rangers	2-08	Nemo Rangers	1-08	
2004	Watergrasshill	2-13	Dromina	2-08	
2003	Bride Rovers	1-15	inniscarra	1-05	
2002	Delaney Rovers	1-13	Carrigtwohill	0-14	*
2001	Killeagh	3-09	Mallow	2-08	*
2000	Douglas	3-08	Aghada	2-04	
1999	Ballincollig	1-14	Blarney	2-09	
1998	Castlelyons	2-12	Killeagh	2-09	
1997	Cloyne	1-12	Delaneys	1-07	
1996	Newtownshandrum	0-12	Cloyne	0-09	*
1995	Kilbrittain	2-17	Ballincollig	1-05	
1994	St. Catherine's	3-12	Cloughduv	2-11	
1993	Youghal	2-13	Kilbrittain	3-07	
1992	Bishopstown	1-09	Youghal	0-09	
1991	Tracton	4-14	Inniscarra	5-09	
1990	St. Finbarr's	1-08	Tracton	0-10	
1989	Valley Rovers	6-12	Kilbrittain	3-05	
1988	Youghal	4-06	Kilbrittain	2-11	
1987	Erin's Own	1-06	Mallow	0-08	
1986	Cloughduv	2-12	Erin's Own	0-11	
1985	Éire Óg	0-14	Blackrock	2-07	
1984	Erin's Own	0-15	Cloughduv	1-05	
1983	Cloughduv	1-14	Ballinhassig	1-06	
1982	Milford	4-07	Erin's Own	1-06	
1981	Newtownshandrum	3-12	Cloughduv	1-10	
1980	Ballyhea	0-15	Mallow	1-10	
1979	Éire Óg	7-11	Mallow	5-08	
1978	Midleton	1-12	Newtownshandrum	1-10	
1977	Ballinhassig	1-16	Ballyhea	1-11	
1976	Newtownshandrum	2-10	Passage	1-12	
1975	Ballinhassig	3-12	Blackrock	2-05	
1974	Bandon	2-07	Midleton	1-06	
1973	Cloughduv	2-09	Blackrock	2-05	
1972	Mallow	4-10	Blackrock	1-09	
1971	Nemo Rangers	4-11	Carrigtwohill	2-03	*
1970	Cloyne	2-18	Castletownroche	4-06	
1969	Youghal	3-07	Cobh	0-13	
1968	St. Vincent's	2-11	Youghal	1-12	
1967	Ballincollig	3-08	Cobh	3-07	
1966	Cloyne	4-11	Cobh	3-06	
1965	Glen Rovers	3-08	Éire Óg	3-05	
1964	Castletownroche	4-11	Youghal	3-06	
1963	Cobh	2-10	Castletownroche	3-05	
1962	Midleton	3-08	Cobh	2-03	
1961	Glen Rovers	4-06	Castletownroche	1-06	*
1960	Passage	3-07	St. Vincent's	1-08	
1959	Mallow	2-08	St. Vincent's	3-03	
1958	Glen Rovers	5-09	Rathluirc	3-06	
1957	Glen Rovers	6-08	St. Finbarr's	2-06	
1956	Glen Rovers	1-11	Carrigaline	1-03	
1955	Youghal	4-06	Mallow	2-05	
1954	Glen Rovers	4-07	Ballymartle	4-02	
1953	Newtownshandrum	0-05	Glen Rovers	0-04	
1952	Bandon	1-05	Glen Rovers	1-02	
1951	Shanballymore	2-06	Midleton	1-04	
1950	Carrigtwohill	6-04	Shanballymore	1-01	
1949	Carrigtwohill	3-10	Newtownshandrum	3-05	
1948	Midleton	6-04	Shanballymore	1-01	
1947	Charleville	4-07	Newtownshandrum	4-04	
1946	Charleville	8-06	Cloughduv	4-06	
1945	1st Battalion	3-11	Oldcastletown	0-04	
1944	Lough Rovers	2-04	Oldcastletown	0-01	
1943	Shanballymore	7-09	Douglas	3-02	
1942	Lough Rovers	3-05	Carrigtwohill	3-02	
1941	Cloughduv	6-04	Buttevant	3-00	
1940	Buttevant	2-04	Ballincollig	1-04	
1939	Ballincollig	4-06	Ballinora	4-02	
1938	Blarney	1-04	St. Anne's	1-00	
1937	Blarney	4-05	Éire Óg	3-02	
1936	St. Anne's	2-07	Lough Rovers	0-03	
1935	Ballincollig	4-02	St. Columb's	3-02	
1934	Ballincollig	3-03	Kinsale	2-03	
1933	Lough Rovers	5-03	Bride Rovers	2-01	
1932	Ballinora	2-05	Buttevant	1-03	
1931	Ballyhea	7-04	Bandon	1-01	
1930	Passage	4-01	Buttevant	1-03	
1929	Ballincollig	2-02	Buttevant	0-00	
1928	Nemo Rangers	5-07	Buttevant	0-00	
1927	Cobh	1-01	Fr. Matthew Hall	3-03	*
1926	Kinsale	5-02	Buttevant	4-04	
1925	Glen Rovers	7-02	Inniscarra	2-03	
1924	Passage	3-00	Sarsfields	2-00	
1923	Mallow	2-02	Evergreen	2-01	
1922	Castletreasure	3-01	Inniscarra	2-00	
1921	No Championship				
1920	Championship unfinished				
1919	Fairhill	w/o	Dromina	scr.	
1918	Nemo Rangers	7-05	Mallow	0-01	
1917	Emmets	5-01	Mallow	5-00	
1916	Cobh	5-04	Mallow	0-03	
1915	Shamrocks	7-02	Castletownroche	3-03	
1914	Charleville	w/o	Shamrocks	scr.	
1913	Redmonds	5-03	Cloyne	1-00	
1912	Ballincollig	5-03	Redmonds	5-00	
1911	Cloughduv	6-02	Blackrock	3-01	
1910	Aghabullogue	3-02	Shamrocks	2-00	
1909	Carrigtwohill	4-11	Shamrocks	0-06	

=== Notes ===
- 1927 - Cobh objected and were awarded the title.
- 1961 - The first match ended in a draw: Glen Rovers 2-3, Castletownroche 0-9.
- 1971 - The first match ended in a draw: Nemo Rangers 4-13, Carrigtwohill 8-1.
- 1996 - The first match ended in a draw: Newtownshandrum 2-7, Cloyne 1-10.
- 2001 - The first match ended in a draw: Killeagh 1-14, Mallow 1-14.
- 2002 - The first match ended in a draw: Delaneys 2-9, Carrigtwohill 1-12.
- 2005 - The first match ended in a draw: Argideen Rangers 1-8, Nemo Rangers 0-11.
- 2010 - The first match ended in a draw: Ballygarvan 2-12, Kilbrittain 1-15.
- 2016 - The first match ended in a draw: Fr. O'Neill's 0-16, Kildorrery 1-13.

== Roll of honour ==
=== By club ===
#	Club	Titles	Runners-up	Winning years	Losing years
1	Ballincollig	8	2	1912, 1929, 1934, 1935, 1939, 1967, 1999, 2018	1940, 1995
2	Glen Rovers	7	1	1925, 1954, 1956, 1957, 1958, 1961, 1965	1953
3	Cloughduv	5	6	1911, 1941, 1973, 1983, 1986	1946, 1981, 1984, 1994, 2019, 2022
4	Bandon	4	4	1952, 1974, 2011, 2026	1931, 2007, 2008, 2025
4	Youghal	4	3	1955, 1969, 1988, 1993	1964, 1968, 1992
4	Newtownshandrum	4	3	1953, 1976, 1981, 1996	1947, 1949, 1978
4	Charleville	4	1	1914, 1946, 1947, 2015	2014
8	Mallow	3	8	1923, 1959, 1972	1916, 1917, 1918, 1955, 1979, 1980, 1987, 2001
8	Cobh	3	4	1916, 1927, 1963	1962, 1966, 1967, 1969
8	Éire Óg	3	4	1979, 1985, 2020	1937, 1965, 2013, 2017
8	Carrigtwohill	3	3	1909, 1949, 1950	1942, 1971, 2002
8	Midleton	3	2	1948, 1962, 1978	1951, 1974
8	Cloyne	3	2	1966, 1970, 1997	1913, 1996
8	Passage West	3	1	1924, 1930, 1960	1976
8	Nemo Rangers	3	1	1918, 1928, 1971	2005
8	Lough Rovers	3	1	1933, 1942, 1944	1936
8	Aghabullogue	3	1	1910, 2023, 2025	2020
18	Erin's Own	2	3	1984, 1987	1982, 1986, 2024
18	Kilbrittain	2	3	1995, 2010	1988, 1989, 1993
18	Shanballymore	2	2	1943, 1951	1948, 1950
18	Blarney	2	1	1937, 1938	1999
18	Ballyhea	2	1	1931, 1980	1977
18	Ballinhassig	2	1	1975, 1977	1983
18	Fr O'Neill's	2	1	2007, 2016	2011
18	Valley Rovers	2	0	1989, 2009	—
26	Buttevant	1	6	1940	1926, 1928, 1929, 1930, 1932, 1941
26	Blackrock	1	6	2019	1911, 1972, 1973, 1975, 1985, 2018
26	Castletownroche	1	4	1964	1915, 1961, 1963, 1970
26	Shamrocks	1	3	1915	1909, 1910, 1914
26	Carrigaline	1	3	2008	1956, 1958, 2006
26	St Vincent's	1	2	1968	1959, 1960
26	St Finbarr's	1	2	1990	1952, 1957
26	Aghada	1	2	2017	2000, 2026
26	Redmonds	1	1	1913	1912
26	Kinsale	1	1	1926	1934
26	Ballinora	1	1	1932	1939
26	St. Anne's	1	1	1936	1938
26	Tracton	1	1	1991	1990
26	Douglas	1	1	2000	1943
26	Killeagh	1	1	2001	1998
26	Delaney Rovers	1	1	2002	1997
26	Bride Rovers	1	1	2003	1933
26	Ballymartle	1	1	2006	1954
26	Kilworth	1	1	2012	2009
26	Kanturk	1	1	2013	2012
26	Emmets	1	0	1917	—
26	Fairhill	1	0	1919	—
26	Castletreasure	1	0	1922	—
26	31st Battalion	1	0	1945	—
26	Milford	1	0	1982	—
26	Bishopstown	1	0	1992	—
26	St Catherine's	1	0	1994	—
26	Castlelyons	1	0	1998	—
26	Watergrasshill	1	0	2004	—
26	Argideen Rangers	1	0	2005	—
26	Fermoy	1	0	2014	—
26	Castlemartyr	1	0	2021	—
26	Dungourney	1	0	2022	—
26	Lisgoold	1	0	2024	—
60	Inniscarra	0	4	—	1922, 1925, 1991, 2003
60	Oldcastletown	0	2	—	1944, 1945
60	Dromina	0	2	—	1919, 2004
60	Sarsfields	0	2	—	1924, 2021
60	Evergreen	0	1	—	1923
60	Fr. Matthew Hall	0	1	—	1927
60	St. Columb's	0	1	—	1935
60	Ballygarvan	0	1	—	2010
60	Dripsey	0	1	—	2015
60	Kildorrery	0	1	—	2016

=== By Division ===
#	Division	Titles	Runners-Up	Total	Most recent success
1	Imokilly	29	24	53	2024
2	Seandún	27	21	48	2019
3	Muskerry	22	20	42	2025
4	Avondhu	21	31	52	2015
5	Carrigdhoun	9	11	11	2009
6	Carbery	7	7	14	2026
7	Duhallow	1	1	2	2013

== Records and statistics ==
=== Final ===
==== Team ====
- Most wins: 8:
  - Ballincollig (1912, 1929, 1934, 1935, 1939, 1967, 1999, 2018)
- Most consecutive wins: 3:
  - Glen Rovers (1956, 1957, 1958)
- Most appearances in a final: 11:
  - Mallow (1916, 1917, 1918, 1923, 1955, 1959, 1972, 1979, 1980, 1987, 2001)
- Most appearances in a final without ever winning: 4:
  - Inniscarra (1922, 1925, 1991, 2003)
- Most defeats: 8:
  - Mallow (1916, 1917, 1918, 1955, 1979, 1980, 1987, 2001)

=== Teams ===
==== Gaps ====
Longest gaps between successive championship titles:

- 113 years: Aghabullogue (1910-2023)
- 58 years: Charleville (1957-2015)
- 43 years: Nemo Rangers (1928-1971)
- 40 years: Carrigtwohill (1909-1949)
- 37 years: Bandon (1974-2011)
- 36 years: Mallow (1923-1959)
- 36 years: Cobh (1927-1963)
- 36 years: Ballyhea (1944-1980)
- 35 years: Éire Óg (1985-2020)
- 32 years: Charleville (1914-1946)
- 32 years: Cloughduv (1941-1973)

=== Top scorers ===
==== All time ====
As of 7 August 2021.

Rank	Name	Team	Goals	Points	Total
1	Kevin Hallissey	Éire Óg	15	231	356
2	Mark Kennefick	Ballygarvan	15	224	269
3	Dan O'Connell	Kilbrittain	22	193	259
4	Peter O'Brien	Kildorrery	6	236	254
5	Ger Cummins	Ballymartle	18	160	214
6	Richie Lewis	Aghada	10	182	212
7	Lorcán McLoughlin	Kanturk	2	198	204
8	Adrian Mannix	Kilworth	7	180	201

==== By year ====
Year	Top scorer	Team	Score	Total
1982	Don O'Leary	Cloughduv	4-14	26
1983	Denis Desmond	Éire Óg	0-28	28
1984	Dave Relihan	Castletownroche	2-15	21
1985	Pat Walsh	Douglas	5-10	25
1986	Don O'Leary	Cloughduv	2-27	33
1987	Martin Fitzpatrick	Ballymartle	1-22	25
1988	Seánie Ring	Youghal	2-24	30
1989	John Shiels	Valley Rovers	3-22	31
1990	Ronan Sheehan	Mallow	0-37	37
1991	Patrick Murphy	Tracton	2-29	35
1992	Phil Cahill	Cloyne	2-19	25
1993	Eoin Coleman	Youghal	2-27	33
1994	Christy Clancy	St. Catherine's	2-34	40
1995	Dan O'Connell	Kilbrittain	4-20	32
1996	Ben O'Connor	Newtownshandrum	3-33	42
1997	Dan O'Brien	Milford	1-29	32
1998	Joe Deane	Killeagh	3-24	33
1999	Podsie O'Mahony	Ballincollig	3-24	33
2000	Richie Lewis	Aghada	3-41	50
2001	Joe Deane	Killeagh	5-48	63
2002	John Egan	Delanys	0-38	38
2003	Eoin Coleman	Youghal	0-31	31
2004	James Masters	Nemo Rangers	4-34	46
2005	James Masters	Nemo Rangers	3-35	44
2006	James Masters	Nemo Rangers	1-31	34
2007	Ger O'Leary	Fr. O'Neill's	0-41	41
2008	Darren Crowley	Bandon	0-36	36
2009	Adrian Mannix	Kilworth	2-49	55
2010	Adrian Mannix	Kilworth	1-57	60
2011	Ronan Crowley	Bandon	1-39	42
2012	Adrian Mannix	Kilworth	2-31	37
2013	Michael Walsh	Argideen Rangers	4-25	37
2013	Kevin Hallissey	Éire Óg	1-34	37
2014	Peter O'Brien	Kildorrery	1-47	50
2015	Diarmuid O'Riordan	Dripsey	2-41	47
2016	Declan Dalton	Fr. O'Neill's	5-55	70
2017	Kevin Hallissey	Éire Óg	1-59	62
2018	Cian Dorgan	Ballincollig	0-57	57
2019	Brian Verling	Cloughduv	1-43	46
2020	Cormac Duggan	Sarsfields	4-35	47

==== In finals ====
Year	Top scorer	Team	Score	Total
1997	Ian Quinlan	Cloyne	1-02	5
1997	Éamonn Canavan	Cloyne	0-05	5
1998	Joe Deane	Killeagh	1-04	7
1999	Podsie O'Mahony	Ballincollig	0-08	8
2000	Richie Lewis	Aghada	2-02	8
2001	Joe Deane	Killeagh	1-05	8
2002	John Egan	Delanys	0-07	7
2003	Pat Walsh	Bride Rovers	1-01	4
2003	Mark O'Sullivan	Inniscarra	1-01	4
2004	Martin Finn	Dromina	2-04	10
2005	Michael Walsh	Argideen Rangers	2-03	9
2006	Stephen Corcoran	Carrigaline	0-09	9
2007	Darren Crowley	Bandon	0-06	6
2008	Darren Crowley	Bandon	0-05	5
2008	Stephen Corcoran	Carrigaline	0-05	5
2009	Adrian Mannix	Kilworth	1-09	12
2010	Mark Kennefick	Ballygarvan	0-07	7
2011	Jason McCarthy	Bandon	2-00	6
2011	Ronan Crowley	Bandon	0-06	6
2012	Adrian Mannix	Kilworth	0-08	8
2013	Kevin Hallissey	Éire Óg	1-08	11
2013	Lorcán McLoughlin	Kanturk	0-11	11
2014	Andrew Cagney	Charleville	0-09	9
2015	Andrew Cagney	Charleville	3-05	14
2016	Declan Dalton	Fr. O'Neill's	1-08	11
2017	Cian Fleming	Ballincollig	0-06	6
2017	Kevin Hallissey	Éire Óg	0-06	6
2018	Eoin O'Farrell	Blackrock	0-09	9
2019	Eoin O'Farrell	Blackrock	0-10	10
2020	Kevin Hallissey	Éire Óg	0-07	7

== See also ==
- Cork Premier Intermediate Hurling Championship
