= 1923 Cork Intermediate Hurling Championship =

Irish hurling competition

- Champions: Mallow (1st title)
- Runners-up: Evergreen

The 1923 Cork Intermediate Hurling Championship was the 14th staging of the Cork Intermediate Hurling Championship since its establishment by the Cork County Board in 1909.

The final was played on 9 December 1923 at Turners Cross in Cork, between Mallow and Evergreen, in what was their first ever meeting in the final. Mallow won the match by 2–02 to 2–01 to claim their first ever championship title.

== Results ==
=== Final ===
9 December 1923 Final	Mallow	2-02 - 2-01	Evergreen	Turners Cross
