= 1956 Cork Intermediate Hurling Championship =

Irish hurling competition

- Dates: 6 May – 26 August 1956
- Teams: 12
- Champions: Glen Rovers (3rd title); Éamonn Goulding (captain)
- Runners-up: Carrigaline

Tournament statistics
- Matches played: 11
- Goals scored: 61 (5.55 per match)
- Points scored: 124 (11.27 per match)

The 1956 Cork Intermediate Hurling Championship was the 47th staging of the Cork Intermediate Hurling Championship since its establishment by the Cork County Board in 1909. The draw for th first round fixtures was made on 22 January 1956. The championship ran from 6 May to 26 August 1956.

The final was played on 26 August 1956 at Manning Park in Passage West, between Glen Rover and Carrigaline, in what was their first ever meeting in the final. Glen Rovers won the match by 1–11 to 1–03 to claim their third championship title overall and a first title in two years.

== Results ==
=== First round ===
6 May 1956 First round	Bandon	5-08 - 1-02	Passage	Ballinhassig Grounds

13 May 1956 First round	Na Piarsaigh	7-06 - 2-04	Ballymartle	Carrigaline Grounds

20 May 1956 First round	Carrigaline	5-04 - 2-06	St Vincent's	Cork Athletic Grounds

20 May 1956 First round	Ballyhea	2-04 - 4-09	Shanballymore	Doneraile Grounds

27 May 1956 First round	Catslemagner	2-04 - 3-18	Glen Rovers	Newmarket Grounds

3 June 1956 First round	Mallow	4-06 - 1-03	Rathluirc	Buttevant Grounds

=== Second round ===
8 July 1956 Second round	Mallow	2-03 - 2-02	Bandon	Cork Athletic Grounds

8 July 1956 Second round	Glen Rovers	3-07 - 0-02	Na Piarsaigh	The Mardyke

- Carrigaline and Shanballymore received a bye in this round.

=== Semi-final ===
5 August 1956 Semi-final	Carrigaline	5-06 - 4-04	Shanballymore	Cork Athletic Grounds

5 August 1956 Semi-final	Glen Rovers	4-08 - 1-04	Mallow	Cork Athletic Grounds

=== Final ===
26 August 1956 Final	Glen Rovers	1-11 - 1-03	Carrigaline	Manning Park
