= 1935 Cork Intermediate Hurling Championship =

Irish hurling competition

- Champions: Ballincollig (4th title)
- Runners-up: St Columba's

The 1935 Cork Intermediate Hurling Championship was the 26th staging of the Cork Intermediate Hurling Championship since its establishment by the Cork County Board in 1909.

Ballincollig entered the championship as the defending champions.

The final was played on 27 October 1935 at the Athletic Grounds in Cork, between Ballincollig and St Columba's, in what was their first ever meeting in the final. Ballincollig won the match by 4–02 to 3–02 to claim their fourth championship title overall and a second championship title in succession.

== Results ==
=== Final ===
27 October 1935 Final	Ballincollig	4-02 – 3-02	St Columba's	Cork Athletic Grounds
