= 2024 Cork Intermediate A Hurling Championship =

Annual hurling competition season

- Dates: 3 August - 10 November 2024
- Teams: 12
- Sponsor: Co-Op Superstores
- Champions: Lisgoold (1st title); Liam O'Shea (captain); Mossie O'Connell (manager)
- Runners-up: Erin's Own; Ian O'Mahony (captain); Brian O’Shea (manager)
- Relegated: Cloughduv

Tournament statistics
- Matches played: 25
- Goals scored: 79 (3.16 per match)
- Points scored: 844 (33.76 per match)
- Top scorer(s): Alan Bowen (1-51)

The 2024 Cork Intermediate A Hurling Championship was the fifth staging of the Cork Intermediate A Hurling Championship and the 115th staging overall of a championship for lower-ranking intermediate hurling teams in Cork. The draw for the group stage placings took place on 14 December 2023. The championship ran from 3 August to 10 November 2024.

The final, a replay, was played on 10 November 2024 at SuperValu Páirc Uí Chaoimh in Cork, between Lisgoold and Erin's Own, in what was their first ever meeting in the final. Lisgoold won the match by 2-18 to 2-13 to claim their first ever championship title.

Alan Bowen was the championship's top scorer with 1-51.

== Team changes ==
=== To Championship ===
Relegated from the Cork Premier Intermediate Hurling Championship

- Bandon

Promoted from the Cork Premier Junior Hurling Championship

- Erin's Own

=== From Championship ===
Promoted to the Cork Premier Intermediate Hurling Championship

- Aghabullogue

Relegated to the Cork Premier Junior Hurling Championship

- Douglas

== Group A ==
=== Group A table ===
Knockout stage Relegation playoff

Team	Matches				Score			Pts
Team	Pld	W	D	L	For	Against	Diff	Pts
Midleton	3	2	1	0	62	52	10	5
Ballygiblin	3	2	0	1	66	58	8	4
Sarsfields	3	1	1	1	55	60	-5	3
Aghada	3	0	0	3	48	61	-13	0

=== Group A results ===
4 August 2024 Round 1	Aghada	0-13 - 2-12	Sarsfields	Jamesy Kelleher Park
	F O'Connor 0-6, W Leahy 0-3.	Report	A Myers 2-7.

4 August 2024 Round 1	Midleton	1-18 - 1-14	Ballygiblin	St Catherine's Park
	A Mulcahy 0-10, G Manley 1-1, R Hartnett 0-3, A Ryan 0-2, K Farmer 0-1, A Daly 0-1.	Report	J O’Sullivan 0-7, D Flynn 1-2, S Beston 0-2, E Flynn 0-1, R Donegan 0-1, D Sheehan 0-1.

23 August 2024 Round 2	Sarsfields	1-16 - 1-16	Midleton	Páirc Uí Chonaill
		Report	A Mulcahy 0-8 (0-6 Frees), A Daly 1-1, A Ryan 0-2, E McCarthy, T Roche, G Carroll, R Hartnett and C Crowley 0-1 each.

24 August 2024 Round 2	Ballygiblin	2-15 - 0-19	Aghada	Castlelyons Grounds
	D Flynn 0-8, S Beston 1-1, S O’Sullivan 1-1, R Donegan 0-3, E Geary 0-2.	Report	W Leahy 0-11, C Terry 0-4, D Creedon 0-2, F O'Connor 0-1, J O'Hanlon 0-1.

7 September 2024 Round 3	Ballygiblin	2-22 - 0-18	Sarsfields	Mill Field
	D Flynn 1-10, J O'Sullivan 0-6, S Beston 1-1, C O'Mahony 0-3, K Duggan 0-1, D Sheehan 0-1.		L Healy 0-8, C McCarthy 0-4, B Graham 0-3, D Long 0-2, C O'Rourke 0-1.

7 September 2024 Round 3	Midleton	1-19 - 0-16	Aghada	Castlemartyr Grounds
	A Mulcahy 1-14 (0-10 frees), G Carroll and K Farmer 0-2 each, A Ryan 0-1.	Report

== Group B ==
=== Group B table ===
Knockout stage

Team	Matches				Score			Pts
Team	Pld	W	D	L	For	Against	Diff	Pts
Erin's Own	3	2	0	1	64	66	-2	4
Blackrock	3	2	0	1	63	57	6	4
Kildorrery	3	1	0	2	65	65	0	2
Bandon	3	1	0	2	51	55	-4	2

=== Group B results ===
4 August 2024 Round 1	Bandon	0-08 - 3-08	Blackrock	Ballinora Grounds
	C Long 0-3, R Desmond 0-2, C McCarthy 0-1, E McSweeney 0-1, M Sugrue 0-1.	Report	T Grainger 2-0, S Healy 1-1.

4 August 2024 Round 1	Erin's Own	0-22 - 0-20	Kildorrery	Castletownroche Grounds
	A Bowen 0-16, T O'Connell 0-2, C O'Sullivan 0-1, P Fitzgerald 0-1, I O'Mahony 0-1, R Blackton 0-1.	Report	P O'Brien 0-8, J Keating 0-4, L Keating 0-3, J McEniry 0-2, D Kelly 0-1, J O'Sullivan 0-1, C Harrington 0-1.

24 August 2024 Round 2	Kildorrery	2-14 - 1-14	Bandon	Felix Sarsfield Memorial Park
	J Keating 1-1, J McEniry 0-4, K Hurley 1-0, D Kelly 0-3, P O'Brien 0-3, M Walsh 0-1, L Keating 0-1, D Kent 0-1.	Report	M Cahalane 1-5, E McSweeney 0-3, D Crowley 0-3, C Long 0-2, M Sugrue 0-1.

24 August 2024 Round 2	Blackrock	1-17 - 2-18	Erin's Own	Ted Hanley Memorial Park
	E O'Farrell 0-8.	Report	A Bowen 0-6.

7 September 2024 Round 3	Blackrock	4-14 - 3-16	Kildorrery	Glanworth Grounds
	T Deasy 1–3 (2f), C O'Leary 1–1, D Cormack 1–1, T Grainger 1–0, E O'Farrell 0–2 (1f, 65), E Coughlan 0–2, I O'Keeffe 0–2, L O'Sullivan 0–1, M O'Keeffe 0-1, R Browne 0–1 (1f).		L Keating 1-3, K Hurley 1-2, P Piggott 1-2, P O'Brien 0-4, D Kelly 0-2, J Keating 0-1, S Fitzgerald 0-1, J McEniry 0-1.

7 September 2024 Round 3	Bandon	2-20 - 2-12	Erin's Own	Riverstick Grounds
	M Cahalane 0-8 (0-4 f), M Sugrue 0-5, R Desmond 1-1, E McSweeney, C Long, D Crowley 0-2 each, C McCarthy 1-0.	Report	S Horgan 2-0, A Bowen 0-5 f, R Blackton 0-3, K Murphy 0-2, S Power, T Connell 0-1 each.

== Group C ==
=== Group C table ===
Knockout stage Relegation playoff

Team	Matches				Score			Pts
Team	Pld	W	D	L	For	Against	Diff	Pts
Lisgoold	3	3	0	0	105	63	42	6
Mayfield	3	1	1	1	62	75	-13	3
Youghal	3	1	0	2	54	66	-12	2
Cloughduv	3	0	1	2	68	85	-17	1

=== Group C results ===
3 August 2024 Round 1	Cloughduv	1-11 - 2-16	Youghal	Church Road
		Report	D O Donoghue (1-5, 0-3 f), J Murray (0-6, 5pts f), B Cooper (0-3), B Moloney (0-1), O Hill (0-1).

4 August 2024 Round 1	Mayfield	1-12 - 4-25	Lisgoold	Castlelyons Grounds
	D O’Neill 1-6, N Kelly 0-7 (0-6 f), D Malone, S O’Donovan 0-2 each, MJ Coffey 0-1.	Report	J O’Driscoll 2-4, I Walsh 2-2, D Healy 0-5, L O’Shea 0-10 (0-8 f), L Walsh 0-2, M Hegarty, C Hickey 0-1 each,

24 August 2024 Round 2	Lisgoold	5-23 - 4-17	Cloughduv	Ballincollig Grounds
	L O'Shea 2-13, I Walsh 1-0, J O'Driscoll 1-0, C Hallahan 1-0, M Hegarty 0-2, D Healy 0-2, C Hickey 0-2, J Cashman 0-2, L Walsh 0-1, T Savage 0-1.	Report	M Verling 2-12, B McNabola 2-0, E Clifford 0-2, J Walsh 0-1, A Murphy 0-1, P O'Driscoll 0-1.

24 August 2024 Round 2	Youghal	1-10 - 2-16	Mayfield	Christy Ring Memorial Park
		Report	N Kelly 0-12.

7 September 2024 Round 3	Mayfield	3-16 - 3-16	Cloughduv	Ballincollig Grounds
	N Kelly 1-8 (1-0 pen, 0-6 f), MJ Coffey 1-2, P Duggan 1-0, D O’Neill 0-2, F McSweeney, D O'Gorman, D Malone, K Punch 0-1 each.	Report	M Verling 2-8 (1-5 f, 1-0 pen), O O’Driscoll 1-1, D Cronin, B McNabola 0-2 each, E Clifford, K Walsh, W Ahern 0-1 each.

7 September 2024 Round 3	Lisgoold	2-24 - 2-13	Youghal	Aghavine Grounds
	L O'Shea 0-6 (0-4 f), I Walsh 1-2, C Hickey 1-1, M Hegarty, J Cashman 0-4 each, D Healy 0-3, J O'Driscoll 0-2, L Walsh, K Cashman 0-1.	Report	J Murray 0-7 (0-6 f), O Hill 2-0, D O'Donoghue 0-3 (0-2 f), S Smiddy, B Cooper, J O'Mahony 0-1 each.

== Knockout stage ==
=== Bracket ===
Quarter-Finals
Ballygiblin (Avondhu)	1-21
Blackrock (Seandun)	2-12
Erin's Own (Imokilly)	2-24
Mayfield (Seandun)	1-14

Semi-Finals
Lisgoold (Imokilly)	0-20
Ballygiblin (Avondhu)	0-14
Midleton (Imokilly)	0-14
Erin's Own (Imokilly)	3-11

Final
Lisgoold (Imokilly)
Erin's Own (Imokilly)

=== Relegation playoff ===
21 September 2024 Playoff	Aghada	2-26 - 2-20	Cloughduv	Ted Hanley Memorial Park
	P O'Neill 1-4, W Leahy 0-5, R O'Connell 0-3.	Report	M Verling 0-12.

=== Quarter-finals ===
21 September 2024 Quarter-final	Erin's Own	2-24 - 1-14	Mayfield	Ballymaw Grounds
	A Bowen (0-12, 8fs, 1 ’65), C Lenihan (1-3), T Connell (1-1), R Blackton (0-4), C Coakley (0-2), B Nolan and J McMahon (0-1 each).	Report	N Kelly (0-6, 6fs), D O’Neil (0-4), D O’Gorman (1-0), D Hayes (0-2), S O’Donovan and MJ Coffey (0-1 each).

22 September 2024 Quarter-final	Ballygiblin	1-21 - 2-12	Blackrock	Mourneabbey Grounds
	D Flynn 0-8; J O’Sullivan 0-8 (5f, 1 65), S O’Sullivan 1-1, S Beston and C O’Mahony 0-2.	Report	R Browne 1-2 (2f, 1p); R Creegan 1-1; E O’Farrell 0-4 (2f), J O’Sullivan 0-2, C Coakley, L O’Donovan, S Healy all 0-1.

=== Semi-finals ===
12 October 2024 Semi-final	Lisgoold	0-20 - 0-14	Ballygiblin	St Catherine's Park
	L O’Shea (0-4 f), J Cashman 0-5 each, M Hegarty 0-4, D Healy 0-3, C Hickey, J O’Driscoll, L Walsh 0-1 each.	Report	D Flynn 0-7 (0-1 f), J O’Sullivan 0-3 (0-2 f, 0-1 65), C O’Mahony 0-2, R Donegan, S O’Sullivan 0-1 each.

12 October 2024 Semi-final	Midleton	0-14 - 3-11	Erin's Own	Páirc Uí Chonaill
	A Ryan (0-9 all frees), K Hartnett (0-2), G Manley (0-2), E McCarthy (0-1)	Report	K Murphy (1-1), S Horgan (1-0), C Lenihan (1-0), A Bowen (0-7, 0-4 frees and 0-1 sideline), J Kavanagh, B Nolan, R Blackton (0-1 each)

=== Final ===
2 November 2024 Final	Lisgoold	1-18 - 2-15	Erin's Own	SuperValu Páirc Uí Chaoimh
	M Hegarty (0-5); J O’Driscoll (1-1); L O’Shea (0-3); D Healy, J Cashman (0-2 each); J Hegarty, K Cashman, L Walsh, I Walsh, C Hallahan (0-1 each).	Report	A Bowen (1-5, 0-3 frees); C Lenihan (1-2); D Twomey, Kieran Murphy (0-2 each); S Cronin, R Blackton, T Connell, O O’Regan (0-1 each).	Referee: N Fahy (Brian Dillons)

=== Final replay ===
10 November 2024 Final	Lisgoold	2-18 - 2-13	Erin's Own	SuperValu Páirc Uí Chaoimh
	L O’Shea (0-1 f), C Hickey 1-2 each, J Cashman (f), D Healy 0-4 each, K Cashman, M Hegarty 0-2 each, I Walsh, J O’Driscoll 0-1 each.	Report	A Bowen 0-7 (0-6 f). S Horgan, D Twomey 1-1 each, A Bowen 0-7 (6f), C Lenihan, I O’Mahony, T Connell, O O’Regan 0-1 each.	Referee: A Hyland (Kilworth)

== Championship statistics ==
=== Top scorers ===
Rank	Player	Club	Tally	Total	Matches	Average
1	Alan Bowen	Erin's Own	1-58	61	7	8.71
2	Liam O'Shea	Lisgoold	3-39	48	6	8.00
3	Mark Verling	Cloughduv	4-32	44		
4	Darragh Flynn	Ballygiblin	2-35	41	5	8.20
5	Nicky Kelly	Mayfield	1-33	36	4	9.00
