= 1925 Cork Intermediate Hurling Championship =

Irish hurling competition

- Champions: Glen Rovers (1st title); P. Collins (captain)
- Runners-up: Inniscarra; J. Desmond (captain)

The 1925 Cork Intermediate Hurling Championship was the 16th staging of the Cork Intermediate Hurling Championship since its establishment by the Cork County Board in 1909.

The final was played on 13 December 1925 at the Ballicollig Grounds, between Glen Rovers and Inniscarra, in what was their first ever meeting in the final. Glen Rovers won the match by 7–02 to 2–03 to claim their first ever championship title.

== Results ==
=== Final ===
13 December 1925 Final	Glen Rovers	7-02 - 2-03	Inniscarra	Ballinollig Grounds
