= 1916 Cork Intermediate Hurling Championship =

Irish hurling competition

- Champions: Cobh (1st title)
- Runners-up: Mallow

The 1916 Cork Intermediate Hurling Championship was the eighth staging of the Cork Intermediate Hurling Championship since its establishment by the Cork County Board in 1909.

The final was played on 5 November 1916 at the Athletic Grounds in Cork, between Cobh and Mallow, in what was their first ever meeting in the final. Cobh won the match by 5–04 to 0–03 to claim their first ever championship title.

== Results ==
=== Final ===
5 November 1916 Final	Cobh	5-04 - 0-03	Mallow	Cork Athletic Grounds
