= 1918 Cork Intermediate Hurling Championship =

Irish hurling competition

- Champions: Nemo (1st title)
- Runners-up: Mallow

The 1918 Cork Intermediate Hurling Championship was the 10th staging of the Cork Intermediate Hurling Championship since its establishment by the Cork County Board in 1909.

The final was played on 5 January 1919 at the Athletic Grounds in Cork, between Nemo and Mallow, in what was their first ever meeting in the final. Nemo won the match by 7–05 to 0–01 to claim their first ever championship title.

== Results ==
=== Final ===
5 January 1919 Final	Nemo	7-05 - 0-01	Mallow	Cork Athletic Grounds
