= 1929 Cork Intermediate Hurling Championship =

Irish hurling competition

- Champions: Ballincollig (2nd title)
- Runners-up: Buttevant

The 1929 Cork Intermediate Hurling Championship was the 20th staging of the Cork Intermediate Hurling Championship since its establishment by the Cork County Board.

The final was played on 29 September 1929 at the Athletic Grounds in Cork, between Ballincollig and Buttevant, in what was their first ever meeting in the final. Ballincollig won the match by 2–02 to 0–05 to claim their second championship title overall and a first championship title in 17 years.

== Results ==
=== Final ===
29 September 1929 Final	Ballincollig	2-02 - 0-05	Buttevant	Cork Athletic Grounds
