= 1922 Cork Intermediate Hurling Championship =

Irish hurling competition

- Champions: Castletreasure (1st title)
- Runners-up: Inniscarra

The 1922 Cork Intermediate Hurling Championship was the 13th staging of the Cork Intermediate Hurling Championship since its establishment by the Cork County Board in 1909. It was the first championship to be completed since 1919 because of the War of Independence.

The final was played on 15 April 1923 at the Athletic Grounds in Cork, between Castletreasure and Inniscarra, in what was their first ever meeting in the final. Castletreasure won the match by 3–01 to 2–01 to claim their first ever championship title.

== Results ==
=== Final ===
15 April 1923 Final	Castletreasure	3-01 - 2-00	Inniscarra	Cork Athletic Grounds
