= 1957 Cork Intermediate Hurling Championship =

Irish hurling competition

- Dates: 14 April – 20 October 1957
- Teams: 14
- Champions: Glen Rovers (4th title)
- Runners-up: St Finbarr's

Tournament statistics
- Matches played: 13
- Goals scored: 50 (3.85 per match)
- Points scored: 145 (11.15 per match)

The 1957 Cork Intermediate Hurling Championship was the 48th staging of the Cork Intermediate Hurling Championship since its establishment by the Cork County Board in 1909. The draw for the first round fixtures took place on 20 January 1957.

Glen Rovers entered the championship as the defending champions.

The final was played on 20 October 1957 at the Athletic Grounds in Cork, between Glen Rovers and St Finbarr's, in what was their first ever meeting in the final. Glen Rovers won the match by 6–08 to 2–06 to claim their fourth championship title overall and a second title in succession.

== Results ==
=== First round ===
14 April 1958 First round	Ballyhea	6-04 - 2-05	St Vincent's	Buttevant Grounds

28 April 1957 First round	Rathluirc	5-04 - 7-06	Bandon	Cork Athletic Grounds

28 April 1957 First round	Glen Rovers	8-14 - 0-02	Buttevant	Bishop Casey Memorial Park

12 May 1957 First round	Carrigaline	5-07 - 4-05	Mallow	Cork Athletic Grounds

19 May 1957 First round	Shanballymore	1-00 - 5-08	Na Piarsaigh	Fitzgerald Park

19 May 1957 First round	Newtownshandrum	3-06 - 7-06	St Finbarr's	Kanturk Grounds

- Passage and Youghal received a bye in this round.

=== Quarter-finals ===
14 April 1957 Quarter-final	Passage	4-03 - 4-01	Youghal	Midleton Grounds

26 May 1957 Quarter-final	Glen Rovers	3-06 - 1-05	Ballyhea	Bishop Casey Memorial Park

24 July 1957 Quarter-final	St Finbarr's	3-06 - 2-05	Na Piarsaigh	The Mardyke

28 July 1957 Quarter-final	Carrigaline	6-06 - 2-06	Bandon	Cork Athletic Grounds

=== Semi-finals ===
18 August 1957 Semi-final	Glen Rovers	7-09 - 3-05	Passage	Carrigaline

15 September 1957 Semi-final	St Finbarr's	3-08 - 4-04	Carrigaline	Cork Athletic Grounds

=== Final ===
20 October 1957 Final	Glen Rovers	6-08 - 2-06	St Finbarr's	Cork Athletic Grounds
