= Castletreasure GAA =

Gaelic games club in County Cork, Ireland

Castletreasure
- Castletreasure
- Founded: 1918
- County: Cork
- Grounds: Castletreasure HC Grounds

Castletreasure Hurling Club was a Gaelic Athletic Association club near Douglas, Cork, Ireland. The club was affiliated to the Cork County Board and was solely concerned with the game of hurling.

== History ==
Located near the Douglas area on the southside of Cork, Castletreasure Hurling Club was founded in 1918. The club was still in its infancy when it claimed the Cork IHC title in 1922, after a 3–01 to 2–01 win over Inniscarra in the final. Promotion to the Cork SHC followed, however, a semi-final appearance was the furthest the club went in their three years in the top grade. Castletreasure disbanded in 1926.

== Honours ==
- Cork Intermediate Hurling Championships (1): 1922
