= 2022 Cork Intermediate A Hurling Championship =

Cork intermediate a hurling championship 2022

- Dates: 29 July - 9 October 2022
- Teams: 12
- Sponsor: Co-Op Superstores
- Champions: Dungourney (1st title); Dylan Healy (captain); Martin Denny (manager)
- Runners-up: Cloughduv; Eoghan Clifford (captain)
- Relegated: Meelin

Tournament statistics
- Matches played: 23
- Goals scored: 67 (2.91 per match)
- Points scored: 831 (36.13 per match)

The 2022 Cork Intermediate A Hurling Championship was the third staging of the Cork Intermediate A Hurling Championship and the 113th staging overall of a championship for middle-ranking intermediate hurling teams in Cork. The draw for the group stage placings took place on 8 February 2022. The championship ran from 29 July to 9 October 2022.

The final was played on 9 October 2022 at Páirc Uí Chaoimh in Cork, between Cloughduv and Dungourney, in what was their first ever meeting in the final. Dungourney won the match by 1-16 to 0-13 to claim their first ever championship title.

== Team changes ==
=== To Championship ===
Promoted from the Cork Lower Intermediate Hurling Championship

- Lisgoold

Relegated from the Cork Premier Intermediate Hurling Championship

- Aghada

=== From Championship ===
Promoted to the Cork Premier Intermediate Hurling Championship

- Castlemartyr

Relegated to the Cork Premier Junior Hurling Championship

- Glen Rovers

== Group A ==
=== Group A table ===
Advanced to knockout stage

Team	Matches				Score			Pts
Team	Pld	W	D	L	For	Against	Diff	Pts
Lisgoold	3	2	1	0	74	54	20	5
Midleton	3	1	1	1	64	65	-1	3
Blackrock	3	1	0	2	76	86	-10	2
Aghada	3	1	0	2	58	67	-9	2

=== Group A results ===
30 July 2022 Round 1	Aghada	0-19 - 1-14	Midleton	Castlemartyr Playing Fields
	W Leahy 0-7, R Murphy 0-6, C Terry 0-3.	Report	A Mulcahy 0-8 (0-6 F), J Nagle 1-0, P Connaughton and D Cremin 0-2 each, M Finn and L Coughlan 0-1 each.

31 July 2022 Round 1	Lisgoold	2-27 - 2-15	Blackrock	Páirc Uí Chonaill
	D Healy 2-5, L O'Shea 0-11, M Hegarty 0-5, T Savage 0-2.	Report

7 August 2022 Round 2	Aghada	1-24 - 3-21	Blackrock	Páirc Uí Chonaill
		Report

7 August 2022 Round 2	Midleton	0-21 - 0-21	Lisgoold	Páirc Séamus de Barra
	A Mulcahy 0-7 (0-4 frees), G Carroll & D Cremin 0-3 each, M Finn, P Connaughton & C Crowley 0-2 each, J Nagles & T Roche 0-1 each.	Report

27 August 2022 Round 3	Aghada	0-12 - 0-20	Lisgoold	Cloyne Grounds
		Report

27 August 2022 Round 3	Midleton	2-20 - 0-25	Blackrock	Páirc Séamus de Barra
		Report

== Group B ==
=== Group B table ===
Advanced to knockout stage Advanced to relegation play-off

Team	Matches				Score			Pts
Team	Pld	W	D	L	For	Against	Diff	Pts
Cloughduv	3	3	0	0	81	58	23	6
Dungourney	3	2	0	1	83	50	33	4
Aghabullogue	3	1	0	2	74	67	7	2
Douglas	3	0	0	3	41	104	-63	0

=== Group B results ===
29 July 2022 Round 1	Cloughduv	2-20 - 1-18	Aghabullogue	Ballyanley Grounds
	B Verling 0-9, J Mannix 0-4, M Walsh 0-4.	Report		Referee: W Wallis

31 July 2022 Round 1	Douglas	0-07 - 4-27	Dungourney	Páirc Uí Rinn
		Report	J Leahy 1-12 (0-1 f), R Denny 0-7 (0-4 f), S Hegarty 1-2, B Forbes 1-2, N McGrath 0-4, J Ahern 1-0.

7 August 2022 Round 2	Aghabullogue	3-25 - 2-13	Douglas	Ballyanley Grounds
		Report

7 August 2022 Round 2	Cloughduv	2-18 - 1-19	Dungourney	Grenagh Grounds
		Report	S Hegarty 1-4, R Denny 0-7 (0-5 f), J Leahy 0-6 (0-4 f), N Geaney 0-1, C Flynn 0-1

27 August 2022 Round 3	Aghabullogue	1-16 - 1-19	Dungourney	Páirc Uí Rinn
		Report	J Leahy 0-7 (0-5f), R Denny 0-6 (0-2f, 0-1 65), J Ahern 1-1, B Forbes 0-2, C Flynn 0-2 and S Hegarty 0-1/

27 August 2022 Round 3	Cloughduv	3-22 - 2-09	Douglas	Brinny Sportsfield
	S O'Donoghue 1-3.	Report

== Group C ==
=== Group C table ===
Advanced to knockout stage Advanced to relegation play-off

Team	Matches				Score			Pts
Team	Pld	W	D	L	For	Against	Diff	Pts
Sarsfields	3	3	0	0	81	48	33	6
Kildorrery	3	2	0	1	70	47	23	4
Mayfield	3	1	0	2	65	80	-15	2
Meelin	3	0	0	3	46	87	-41	0

=== Group C results ===
31 July 2022 Round 1	Kildorrery	3-20 - 0-11	Meelin	Fr. Con Buckley Park
	J McEniry 1-3, J Keating 0-6, J O'Connor 1-2, C Harrington 1-1, P O'Brien 0-4, L Keating 0-2, D Kelly 0-1, F Stapleton 0-1.		N Linehan 0-8, J O'Callaghan 0-1, TJ Twomey 0-1, J Curtin 0-1.

31 July 2022 Round 1	Sarsfields	3-25 - 1-15	Mayfield	Whitechurch Grounds
		Report

6 August 2022 Round 2	Mayfield	2-11 - 2-18	Kildorrery	Felix Sarsfield Memorial Park

7 August 2022 Round 2	Sarsfields	2-22 - 0-13	Meelin	Mourneabbey Grounds
	P O'Driscoll 0-10, R O'Brien 1-2, J Flannery 1-2, S Higgins 0-3, B Nodwell 0-2, E Murphy 0-1, D Long 0-1, J Leahy 0-1.		J Forrest 0-6, N Linehan 0-2, W Murphy 0-2, M McAuliffe 0-2, S Curtin 0-1.

27 August 2022 Round 3	Sarsfields	3-10 - 2-11	Kildorrery	Páirc Mac Gearailt
	R O'Brien 2-1, P O'Driscoll 1-4, L Elliott 0-2, J Flannery 0-2, D Long 0-1.		P O'Brien 0-6, D Kelly 1-1, L Keating 1-0, D Kent 0-1, J Keating 0-1, J McEniry 0-1, S Kelly 0-1.

27 August 2022 Round 3	Mayfield	3-21 - 3-13	Meelin	O'Connell Park
	N Kelly 0-11, D O'Neill 1-3, S Diggan 1-1, T Horgan 1-0, S Kelly 0-2, MJ Coffey 0-2, S O'Donovan 0-1, E O'Sullivan 0-1.		N Linehan 0-9, J Forrest 2-0, M McAuliffe 1-0, W Murphy 0-2, J O'Callaghan 0-1, J McAuliffe 0-1.

== Knockout stage ==
=== Bracket ===
Quarter-Finals
Dungourney (Imokilly)	1-15
Midleton (Imokilly)	1-14
Lisgoold (Imokilly)	0-22
Kildorrery (Avondhu)	0-12

Semi-Finals
Sarsfields (Imokilly)	1-12
Dungourney (Imokilly)	0-18
Cloughduv (AET) (Muskerry)	1-29
Lisgoold (Imokilly)	3-18

Final
Dungourney (Imokilly)	1-16
Cloughduv (Muskerry)	0-13

=== Relegation playoff ===
10 September 2022 Playoff	Douglas	2-24 - 1-25 (aet)	Meelin	O'Connell Park
	M Doan 0-12, B Hartnett 1-0, D Murphy 1-0, C O'Donovan 0-3, C Baldwin 0-2, C Russell 0-2, K McSweeney 0-2, R Murphy 0-1, B O'Connor 0-1, E O'Brien 0-1.	Report	N Linehan 0-12, J Forrest 1-1, J O'Callaghan 0-4, J McAuliffe 0-3, M McAuliffe 0-2, W Murphy 0-2, J Curtin 0-1.

=== Quarter-finals ===
9 September 2022 Quarter-final	Dungourney	1-15 - 1-14	Midleton	Páirc Séamus de Barra
	R Denny 0-7 (0-4 f), J Leahy 0-4 (0-2 f), S Hegarty 0-3, J Ahern 1-0, B Forbes 0-1.	Report	C Fitzgerald 0-6 f, D Cremin 0-3, T Roche 1-0, G Carroll, P Connaughton 0-2 each, J Nagle 0-1 f.	Referee: A Hyland (Kilworth)

9 September 2022 Quarter-final	Lisgoold	0-22 - 0-12	Kildorrery	Páirc Mac Gearailt
	L O'Shea 0-8 (0-6 f), D Healy 0-5, K Cashman 0-4, J Cashman 0-3 (0-1 f) C Hickey, M Hegarty 0-1 each.	Report	P O'Brien 0-7 (0-4 f, 0-1 65), J Keating 0-2 (0-1 f), F Stapleton, J McEniry, D Kelly 0-1 each.	Referee: J McEvoy (Blarney)

=== Semi-finals ===
23 September 2022 Semi-final	Cloughduv	1-29 - 3-18 (aet)	Lisgoold	Riverstown Sportsfield
	B Verling 1-11 (0-8 f, 0-1 65), M Verling, M Walsh 0-4 each, A Murphy 0-3, J Mannix, W Ahern 0-2 each, K Walsh, J Devine, C Canty 0-1 each.	Report	L O’Shea 1-8 (0-6 f, 0-1 65), M Hegarty 1-3, D Healy 1-1, J Cronin and J O’Driscoll 0-2 each, C Hickey and J Cashman 0-1 each.	Referee: P Lyons (Bishopstown)

24 September 2022 Semi-final	Sarsfields	1-12 - 0-18	Dungourney	Páirc Séamus de Barra
	L Elliott 0-5 f, D Long 1-0, P O’Driscoll 0-3 (0-2 f), B Graham (f), L Casey, J O’Leary, R O’Brien 0-1 each.	Report	R Denny 0-7 (0-1 free), J Leahy 0-6 (0-2 f), S Hegarty 0-2, M Leahy, B Forbes and N McGrath 0-1 each.	Referee: D Daly (Brian Dillons)

=== Final ===
9 October 2022 Final	Cloughduv	0-13 - 1-16	Dungourney	Páirc Uí Chaoimh
	B Verling (0-6, frees), A Murphy and M Walsh (0-2 each), C O’Driscoll, M Verling and S O’Donoghue (0-1 each).	Report	J Leahy (0-8, 6 f), R Denny (1-2, 1-0 pen, 0-1 f), S Hegarty (0-4), C Griffin and John Ahern (0-1 each).	Referee: P Lyons (Bishopstown)
