= 2026 Cork Intermediate A Hurling Championship =

Annual hurling competition season

- Dates: 31 July - 31 October 2026
- Teams: 12
- Sponsor: Co-Op Superstores
- Champions: Bandon (4th title); Michael Cahalane (captain); Joe Burke (manager)
- Runners-up: Aghada; Michael Russell (captain); Alan Devoy (manager)
- Relegated: Russell Rovers

Tournament statistics
- Matches played: 24
- Goals scored: 76 (3.17 per match)
- Points scored: 850 (35.42 per match)
- Top scorer: William Leahy (1-41)

The 2026 Cork Intermediate A Hurling Championship was the seventh staging of the Cork Intermediate A Hurling Championship and the 117th staging overall of a championship for lower-ranking intermediate hurling teams in Cork. The draw for the group stage placings took place on 9 December 2025. The championship ran from 31 July to 31 October 2026.

The final was played on 31 October 2026 at SuperValu Páirc Uí Chaoimh in Cork, between Bandon and Aghada, in what was their first ever meeting in the final. Bandon won the match by 0-25 to 2-18 to claim their fourth championship title overall and a first title in 15 years.

Aghada's William Leahy was thw championship's top scorer with 1-41.

== Team changes ==
=== To Championship ===
Relegated from the Cork Premier Intermediate Hurling Championship

- Mallow

Promoted from the Cork Premier Junior Hurling Championship

- Kilbrittain

=== From Championship ===
Promoted to the Cork Premier Intermediate Hurling Championship

- Aghabullogue

Relegated to the Cork Premier Junior Hurling Championship

- Mayfield

== Group 1 ==
=== Group 1 table ===
Semi-finalist Quarter-finalist Relegation playoff

Team	Matches				Score			Pts
Team	Pld	W	D	L	For	Against	Diff	Pts
Bandon	3	2	1	0	66	62	4	5
Aghada	3	1	1	1	77	72	5	3
Kilbrittain	3	1	1	1	66	60	6	3
Russell Rovers (R)	3	0	1	2	57	72	-15	0

=== Group 1 fixtures and results ===
31 July 2026 Round 1	Aghada	1-24 - 2-24	Bandon	Church Road
	M McCarthy 0-6, J O’Hanlon 1-2, W Leahy 0-5, J Looney, J Devoy 0-3 each, S O’Driscoll, F O’Connor, J McDonnell, C Terry, T Hartnett 0-1 each.	Report	M Cahalane 0-15, J Cullinane 1-2, C Long 0-4, D O'Mahony 1-0, M Sugrue 0-2, C Lynch 0-1.

2 August 2026 Round 1	Kilbrittain	3-21 - 1-13	Russell Rovers	Ballinhassig Grounds
	P Wall 2-3, R Crowley 0-6, L Griffin 0-4, M Hickey 0-4, C Hogan 1-0, J O'Donovan 0-3, E O'Neill 0-1.		J Beausang 1-7, J McGrath 0-2, K Tattan 0-1, J Kennefick 0-1, L Duggan-Murray 0-1, D Crotty 0-1.

22 August 2026 Round 2	Russell Rovers	3-15 - 1-21	Aghada	Fr O'Neill's Sports Complex
	J Beausang 1-6, K Walsh 0-3.	Report	J Looney 1-5, W Leahy 0-7, R Murphy, T Hartnett, J O’Hanlon and C Terry 0-2 each.

23 August 2026 Round 2	Bandon	1-15 - 2-12	Kilbrittain	Páirc Uí Riagáin
	M Cahalane 1-5, S Carey 0-2, C Long 0-1, E McSweeney 0-1, C Calnan 0-1, J Cullinane 0-1, D O'Mahony 0-1, P Barry 0-1, O Hennessy 0-1, M Sugrue 0-1.	Report	M Hickey 0-7, L Griffin 1-0, P Wall 1-0, J O'Donovan 0-2, R Crowley 0-2, C Hogan 0-1.

4 September 2026 Round 3	Aghada	1-23 - 0-18	Kilbrittain	Cloughduv Grounds
	W Leahy (0-5 f), J Looney 0-5 each, J O’Hanlon 1-1, F O’Connell, C Terry, R Murphy, S O’Driscoll 0-2 each, N Devoy, T Hartnett, H Mulcahy, P O’Neill 0-1 each.	Report	R Crowley 0-7 (0-4 f), M Hickey 0-4 (0-3 f), L Griffin 0-3, J O’Donovan 0-2, A Holland (0-1 f), A Griffin 0-1 each.

4 September 2026 Round 3	Bandon	0-18 - 0-17	Russell Rovers	Páirc Uí Rinn
	M Cahalane (0-1f) 0-5, M Sugrue 0-4, C Lynch, C Calnan, K Hannon 0-2 each, C Long, S Carey, J Cullinane 0-1 each.	Report	J Beausang (0-7f, 0-1 65) 0-12, J McGrath, J Kennefick 0-2 each, K Aherne 0-1

== Group 2 ==
=== Group 2 table ===
Quarter-finalist

Team	Matches				Score			Pts
Team	Pld	W	D	L	For	Against	Diff	Pts
Mallow	3	2	1	0	81	78	3	5
Midleton	3	1	1	1	74	73	1	3
Blackrock	3	1	0	2	64	60	4	2
Kildorrery	3	0	2	1	61	69	-8	2

=== Group 2 fixtures and results ===
1 August 2026 Round 1	Midleton	0-27 - 1-26	Mallow	Castlelyons Grounds
	A Mulcahy 0-11, P Haughney 0-4, C Mrley 0-4, C Stack 0-2, C Beausang 0-1, C Cronin 0-1, P Barrett 0-1, L O'Farrell 0-1, K Farmer 0-1, D Scanlon 0-1.		P Lyons 0-8, S Hayes 0-7, D Sheehan 1-3, B Noonan 0-3, M Tobin 0-2, J Murphy 0-1, P Healy 0-1, L Malone 0-1.

2 August 2026 Round 1	Kildorrery	0-11 - 1-16	Blackrock	Glenville Grounds
		Report	F O'Keeffe 1-1, L O'Sullivan 0-4, E Coughlan 0-4 (02f), E O'Farrell 0-3, A Geary 0-3, I O'Keeffe 0-1.

21 August 2026 Round 2	Blackrock	1-19 - 2-19	Midleton	Riverstown Sportsfield
		Report	A Mulcahy 0-9.

23 August 2026 Round 2	Mallow	1-25 - 5-13	Kildorrery	Glanworth Grounds
	B Noonan 1-3, P Lyons 0-6, S Hayes 0-5, M Tobin 0-4, D Sheehan 0-3, J Murphy 0-2, L Malone 0-2.	Report	L Keating 2-9, T Murphy 1-0, P Pigott 1-0, F Stapleton 1-0, P O'Brien 0-2, D Kelly 0-2.

4 September 2026 Round 3	Mallow	2-18 - 1-20	Blackrock	O'Connell Park
	S Hayes 1-9, P Lyons 1-4, S Lenehan 0-1, L Malone 0-1, J Murphy 0-1, B Noonan 0-1, D Sheehan 0-1.		E Coughlan 0-9, F O'Keeffe 0-3, T Grainger 1-0, I O'Keeffe 0-2, E O'Farrell 0-1, R O'Riordan 0-1, S O'Keeffe 0-1, C Coughlan 0-1, L O'Sullivan 0-1, A Geary 0-1.

4 September 2026 Round 3	Midleton	1-19 - 1-19	Kildorrery	Clyda Rovers Grounds
	A Mulcahy 0-10, S Quirke 1-1, L O'Farrell 0-2, P Barrett 0-2, P Haughney 0-1, D Egan 0-1, C Beausang 0-1, K Burke 0-1.		L Keating 1-10, P O'Brien 0-2, P Pigott 0-2, J Hunter 0-1, D Kent 0-1, D Kelly 0-1, F Stapleton 0-1, T O'Sullivan 0-1.

== Group 3 ==
=== Group 3 table ===
Semi-finalist Quarter-finalist Relegation playoff

Team	Matches				Score			Pts
Team	Pld	W	D	L	For	Against	Diff	Pts
Sarsfields	3	3	0	0	81	62	19	6
Youghal	3	2	0	1	64	61	3	4
Erin's Own	3	1	0	2	59	67	-8	2
Ballygiblin	3	0	0	3	50	64	-14	0

=== Group 3 results ===
2 August 2026 Round 1	Erin's Own	3-14 - 3-16	Sarsfields	Páirc Uí Chonaill

2 August 2026 Round 1	Youghal	1-14 - 0-16	Ballygiblin	Páirc Naomh Caitríonaigh
	B Cooper 1-2, J Murray 0-5, J Casey 0-2, M Breathnach 0-1, D O'Connell 0-1, M McCarthy 0-1, C O'Mahony 0-1, O Walsh 0-1.		J O'Sullivan 0-10, A O'Brien 0-4, M Walsh 0-1, C Walsh 0-1.

22 August 2026 Round 2	Ballygiblin	1-12 - 2-13	Erin's Own	Ballyhooly Grounds
	J O'Sullivan 0-7, S O'Sullivan 1-1, E Flynn 0-3, M Walsh 0-1.	Report	E Murphy 0-9, J O'Flynn 2-1, K Murphy 0-1, S Kelly 0-1, I O'Mahony 0-1.

23 August 2026 Round 2	Sarsfields	3-19 - 2-14	Youghal	Ted Hanley Memorial Park
	C McCarthy 1-8, S King 1-2, R O’Brien 1-1, F O’Connor 0-2, S Bracken 0-2.	Report	J Murray 1-10.

4 September 2026 Round 3	Erin's Own	1-14 - 1-24	Youghal	Páirc Shéamuis de Barra
	E Murphy 0-6 (3f), C O’Mahony 0-4, C O’Callaghan 1-0, S Foley, S Kelly, D Collins, L Casey 0-1 each.	Report	J Murray 0-12 (7f), O Hill 1-2, J Casey 0-3, A Frahill 0-2, E Cronin, C Coleman, F Hill, C O’Mahony, J Lenane 0-1 each.

4 September 2026 Round 3	Sarsfields	3-19 - 1-16	Ballygiblin	Ballyhooly Grounds
			J O'Sullivan 0-9, A O'Brien 1-1, C Walsh 0-3, E Flynn 0-2, S Beston 0-1.

== Relegation stage ==
=== Relegation final ===
19 September 2026 Playoff	Russell Rovers	0-09 - 2-14	Ballygiblin	Páirc na Bríde
	J Beausang 0-6 (0-3 f, 0-1 65), L Duggan-Murray, B Hartnett, J McGrath 0-1 each.	Report	J O’Sullivan 1-7 (0-6 f), S Beston 1-0, D Flynn 0-2, E Flynn, A O’Brien, Cathail O’Mahony, S O’Sullivan, C Walsh 0-1 each.

== Knockout stage ==
=== Quarter-finals ===
18 September 2026 Quarter-final	Youghal	2-12 - 4-15	Midleton	Jamesy Kelleher Memorial Park
	J Murray 0-9 (0-7f), O Walsh 2-0 (pen,f), J Casey 0-2, C Coleman 0-1.	Report	L O’Farrell 2-2, P Barrett 0-5, K Farmer 1-1, C Beausang 1-1, A Mulcahy 0-4 (0-3f), S Quirke, L Dineen (0-1 each).

19 September 2026 Quarter-final	Mallow	3-21 - 3-23	Aghada	Blarney Grounds
	S Hayes 2-5 (0-5 f), M Tobin 0-7 (0-1 f), P Lyons 0-4, D Sheehan 1-0, S Leneghan 0-2, L Malone, J Murphy, K Sheehan 0-1 each.	Report	W Leahy 0-11 (0-9 f, 0-1 65), J Looney, C Terry 1-2 each, J O’Hanlon 1-1, S O’Driscoll 0-4, T Hartnett, R Murphy, R O’Connell 0-1 each.

=== Semi-finals ===
2 October 2026 Semi-final	Sarsfields	1-14 - 3-18	Aghada	Páirc Shéamuis de Barra
	C McCarthy 0-6 (3f), F O’Connor 1-1, R O’Brien 0-2, R Higgins, D McCarthy, S King, J Huggins, A Hackett 0-1 each.	Report	W Leahy 1-5 (f), J Looney 1-2, C Terry 1-1, R O’Connell, S O’Driscoll, T Harnett 0-2 each, F O’Connell, M Russell, R Murphy, F O’Connor 0-1 each.

3 October 2026 Semi-final	Bandon	3-20 - 1-17	Midleton	Church Road
	M Cahalane 0-9 f, J Cullinane 1-5, K Hannon, M Sugrue 1-0 each, S Carey 0-2, C Long, C Coleman, P Barry 0-1 each.	Report	A Mulcahy 0-9 (0-6 f), L O’Farrell 1-0, K Burke 0-2, E McCarthy, P Barrett, C Stack, D Scanlon, P Haughney, D Egan 0-1 each.

=== Final ===
31 October 2026 Final	Aghada	2-18 - 0-25	Bandon	SuperValu Páirc Uí Chaoimh
	W Leahy 0-8 (0-5f, 0-2 65), J Devoy 1-1, P O’Neill 1-0, C Terry, R Murphy, J Looney 0-2 each, M McCarthy, S O’Driscoll, T Hartnett 0-1 each.	Report	M Cahalane (0-3f), C Long, J Cullinane, C Calnan 0-4 each, D Crowley 0-3, E McSweeney, M Sugrue 0-2 each, D O’Donovan, K Hannon 0-1 each.	Referee: C Walsh (Nemo Rangers)

== Championship statistics ==
=== Top scorers ===
Rank	Player	Club	Tally	Total	Matches	Average
1	William Leahy	Aghada	1-41	44	6	7.66
2	Aaron Mulcahy	Midleton	0-43	43	5	8.60
3	Michael Cahalane	Bandon	1-38	41	5	8.20
4	James Murray	Youghal	1-36	39	4	9.75
5	Josh Beausang	Russell Rovers	2-31	37	4	9.25
6	Joseph O'Sullivan	Ballygiblin	1-33	36	4	9.00
7	Seán Hayes	Mallow	3-26	35	4	8.75
