= 1954 Cork Intermediate Hurling Championship =

Irish hurling competition

- Champions: Glen Rovers (2nd title)
- Runners-up: Ballymartle

The 1954 Cork Intermediate Hurling Championship was the 45th staging of the Cork Intermediate Hurling Championship since its establishment by the Cork County Board in 1909.

The final was played on 19 September 1954 at Carrigaline Sportsfield, between Glen Rovers and Ballymartle, in what was their first ever meeting in the final. Glen Rovers won the match by 4–07 to 4–02 to claim their second championship title overall and a first title in 31 years.

== Results ==
=== Final ===
19 September 1954 Final	Glen Rovers	4-07 - 4-02	Ballymartle	Carrigaline Grounds
