= 1912 Cork Intermediate Hurling Championship =

Irish hurling competition

- Champions: Ballincollig (1st title)
- Runners-up: Redmonds

The 1912 Cork Intermediate Hurling Championship was the fourth staging of the Cork Intermediate Hurling Championship since its establishment by the Cork County Board, which Ballincollig won 5–3 to 5–0 over Redmonds in the final.

== Results ==
Final

Final	Ballincollig	5-03 - 5-00	Redmonds
