= Adrian Mannix =

Cork hurler

Personal information
- Born: 4 March 1988 (age 38) Kilworth

Sport
- Sport: Hurling
- Position: Forward
Club
- Years: Club
- 2000s–: Kilworth
Club titles
- Cork titles: 1
- Munster titles: 1
Inter-county
Years	County	Apps (scores)
2009	Cork	3 (0–4)
Inter-county titles
- Munster titles: 0
- All-Irelands: 0

Adrian Timothy Mannix, also known as "Turkey" (born 1988 in St. Finbarrs Hospital, Cork City, County Cork), is an Irish sportsman. He plays hurling with his local club Kilworth and was a member of the Cork senior team in 2009.

Mannix was a star player for Cork at minor level. He won back-to-back Munster minor titles in 2005 and 2006. In 2009 he played a prominent role with Cork IT and the team reached the Fitzgibbon Cup semi-finals.

At club level, Mannix was described as Kilworth's star forward. He also turned in an inspirational performance in Kilworth's All-Ireland Junior Club Hurling Championship quarter-final victory over British junior champions Granuaile.

After the 2008 Cork senior panel's refusal to play under the management of Gerald McCarthy, Mannix was among the players called up in their place by McCarthy. In Cork's first game of the National Hurling League, he turned in an impressive performance against Dublin, and retained his place on the team to play Tipperary. Mannix again started and scored in the next match, against Galway.
