= Kilworth GAA =

Gaelic games club in County Cork, Ireland

- Cill Úird
- Founded: 1928
- County: Cork
- Colours: Red and white
- Grounds: Moore Park
- Coordinates: 52°10′19.43″N 8°14′23.13″W

Playing kits
Standard colours

Kilworth GAA, or Cill Úird, is a hurling and Gaelic football club located in the village of Kilworth in the north-eastern corner of County Cork, Ireland. It is affiliated to Cork GAA county board and to Avondhu GAA divisional board.

== History ==
It was affiliated in 1928 as a football Club and 1933 as a hurling Club, and two years later saw Kilworth gain their first honours when they captured the Novice hurling championship at Dromina's expense. A long period elapsed before Kilworth once again tasted championship success, this being the 1961 North Cork Junior hurling championship. Kildorrery were the opponents on the day but Kilworth proved too strong winning out on a score line of 3–5 to 1–4. Kilworth progressed to the County final that year but went down to Cloyne after a replay, 4–6 to 2–4. In 1966 Kilworth won a famous U-21 and Junior hurling double beating Ballyhea and parish rivals Araglen respectively. Kanturk sent Kilworth out in the County stages but this experience would put Kilworth in good stead for the following campaign. The U-21 hurlers regained their title as did the Junior team in 1967. In the North Cork final, they defeated Freemount and an historic first County win was on the cards as Kilworth set up a mouth-watering clash with Cloghduv in the final. This proved to be the case as Kilworth outplayed Cloughduv on the day, winning by 3–11 to 2–7 to capture the clubs first County title. Kilworth went on to contest Intermediate hurling for the next three years but were re-graded to Junior level in 1971. On the step down it defeated Liscarrol in the North Cork final by 2–10 to 1–8 but Killeagh ended the quest for County success in the first round. Kilworth's next title wasn't until 1980 when Castletownroche provided the opposition in the final. Kilworth ran out victors on a score line of 3–7 to 1–11 and again qualified for the County final that year. Newcestown were the opponents and defeated an industrious Kilworth side by 1–12 to 2–6. Two years later saw Kilworth take North Cork title number six following the disposal of Charleville in the final. East Cork side St. Catherine's sent us out in the quarter-final of the county series that year and this ended hurling success in Kilworth for a further eight years. In 1991 Kilworth defeated Castletownroche in the North Cork final and came up against Aghada in the county section. Once again Imokilly opposition proved a stumbling block as Aghada overcame Kilworth but two years later saw Kilworth contest this series again after defeating Dromina by a single point in the Avondhu decider. The club progressed to the Cork Junior Hurling Championship final in 1993 but it was Blarney who came out on top on a score line of 2–10 to 1–9. Kilworth contested the divisional final the following year but went down to near neighbours Fermoy before bouncing back to defeat Charleville 3–14 to 1–9 in the 1995 decider. As with 1971, Killeagh ended the county campaign when they defeated us at the semi-final stage in Ballynoe. From that result until 2005, it proved to be bleak years as no North Cork championship was won. Kilworth defeated Clyda Rovers in the divisional final before coming up agonisingly short to Fr. O' Neill's in the County final going down by three points. However, this campaign set the foundations from which Kilworth would capture only their second ever County title and a first for 39 years. 2006 saw Kilworth face Charleville in the North Cork final where experience told and Kilworth emerged with a 1–17 to 0–12 win. Kilworth then looked to atone for the 2005 County final defeat and set up a date with Dungourney in the decider. In a game that was nip and tuck throughout, a last minute point from Adrian Mannix led to scenes of elation as Kilworth ended their barren spell with a 0–13 to 0–12 victory at Páirc Uí Rinn. The club thus qualified for the Munster Junior Club Hurling Championship, which they also won. They went on to reach the semi-finals of the All-Ireland Junior Club Hurling Championship, but lost to Danesfort.

== Honours ==
- Cork Junior Hurling Championship Winners (2) 1967, 2006 Runner-up 1961, 1980, 1993, 2005
- Cork Premier Intermediate Hurling Championship(0) Runners-up 2019
- Cork Intermediate Hurling Championship Winners (1) 2012 Runners-up 2009
- Munster Junior Club Hurling Championship Winners (1) 2006
- Cork Under-21 B Hurling Championship (0) Runners-up 2015
- Cork Minor Hurling Championship (0) Runners-up 2004 (as St. Martin's)
- Cork Minor A Hurling Championship (0) Runners-up 2003 (St. Martin's)
- North Cork Junior A Hurling Championship Winners (11) 1961, 1966, 1967, 1971, 1980, 1983, 1991, 1993, 1995, 2005, 2006

== Sources of information ==
- List of Cork Senior Football Champions
- List of Cork Intermediate Football Champions
- Hogan Stand list of Cork Champions
- Cork GAA results archive page
