= 1909 Cork Intermediate Hurling Championship =

Irish hurling competition

- Dates: 1 August 1909 – 31 October 1909
- Champions: Carrigtwohill (1st title); Jeremiah Fouhy (captain)
- Runners-up: Bandon; Daniel O'Regan (captain)

The 1909 Cork Intermediate Hurling Championship was the inaugural staging of the Cork Intermediate Hurling Championship since its establishment by the Cork County Board. The championship began on 1 August 1909 and ended on 31 October 1909.

On 31 October 1909, Carrigtwohill won the championship following a 3–15 to 2–00 defeat of Bandon in the final at the Cork Athletic Grounds.

== Results ==
=== Final ===
31 October 1909 Final	Carrigtwohill	3-15 - 2-00	Bandon	Cork Athletic Grounds
