= 1976 Cork Junior Hurling Championship =

Irish hurling competition

- Dates: 3 October - 12 December 1976
- Teams: 7
- Champions: Ballyhea (3rd title); Phil Ryan (captain)
- Runners-up: Glen Rovers

Tournament statistics
- Matches played: 8
- Goals scored: 42 (5.25 per match)
- Points scored: 151 (18.88 per match)

The 1976 Cork Junior Hurling Championship was the 79th staging of the Cork Junior Hurling Championship since its establishment by the Cork County Board. The championship ran from 3 October to 12 December 1976.

On 12 December 1976, Ballyhea won the championship following a 4-14 to 4-10 defeat of Glen Rovers in the final at Moore Park in Kilworth. It was their third championship title overall and their first title in 21 years.

== Results ==
=== Quarter-finals ===
| 3 October 1976 Quarter-final | Ballymartle | 7-07 - 3-05 | Cloyne | Páirc Uí Chaoimh |
| | F Coleman 5-1, B Coleman 1-1, K Murphy 1-1, K O'Donovan 0-2, F Cronin 0-2. | | T Canavan 2-0, G O'Brien 1-0, T Ring 0-3, T O'Sullivan 0-2. |

| 17 October 1976 Quarter-final | Ballyhea | 3-13 - 0-09 | Newmarket | Dr. Mannix Sportsfield |
| | D Ryan 1-5, D Flynn 1-0, D O'Sullivan 1-0, P Ryan 0-3, M O'Sullivan 0-3. | | T Burke 0-4, T Cronin 0-2, W Daly 0-2, N Collins 0-1. |

| 17 October 1976 Quarter-final | Glen Rovers | 2-08 - 1-11 | Clonakilty | Kinsale Grounds |
| | C Spain 1-3, N Corcoran 1-1, T O'Neill 0-2, D McCarthy 0-1, K O'Keeffe 0-1. | | M O'Mahony 1-0, D Noonan 0-3, S McCarthy 0-3, E McCarthy 0-2, F O'Regan 0-2, J Forristal 0-1. |

| 14 November 1976 Quarter-final replay | Glen Rovers | 4-10 - 2-09 | Clonakilty | Kinsale Grounds |
| | A Porter 2-2, T O'Neill 1-2, K O'Keeffe 0-5, T Treacy 1-0, D McCarthy 0-1. | | D Noonan 0-7, T Hayes 2-0, J O'Neill 0-1, E McCarthy 0-1. |

=== Semi-finals ===
| 31 October 1976 Semi-final | Ballyhea | 3-16 - 2-09 | Aghabullogue | Newmarket Grounds |
| | P Ryan 2-3, D Ryan 1-6, L Shanahan 0-4, D Flynn 0-1, D O'Sullivan 0-1, C Brassil 0-1. | | V Coakley 1-1, S Noonan 0-4, B Kenneally 1-0, J Allen 0-3, S O'Leary 0-1. | Referee: P Cronin (St. Finbarr's) |

| 28 November 1976 Semi-final | Glen Rovers | 3-05 - 2-08 | Ballymartle | Manning Park |

| 5 December 1976 Semi-final replay | Glen Rovers | 1-09 - 1-08 | Ballymartle | Manning Park |
| | K O'Keeffe 1-1, C Spain 0-4, S Greene 0-2, A Porter 0-1, D McCarthy 0-1. | | F Coleman 1-2, K O'Donovan 0-2, B Coleman 0-1, B Murphy 0-1, J Webb 0-1, G Webb 0-1. |

=== Final ===
| 12 December 1976 Final | Ballyhea | 4-14 - 4-10 | Glen Rovers | Moore Park |
| | L Shanahan 3-0, D Flynn 1-2, P Ryan 0-4, D Ryan 0-4, D O'Sullivan 0-3, J Russell 0-1. | | T O'Neill 2-3, J McCarthy 2-2, A Porter 0-3, S Greene 0-1, C Spain 0-1. |
