= Daithí Casey =

Irish Gaelic footballer

Personal information
- Native name: Daithí Ó Cathasaigh (Irish)
- Nickname: Dots
- Born: March 1990 (age 36) Killarney, County Kerry, Ireland
- Occupation: Primary school teacher
- Height: 6 ft 0 in (183 cm)

Sport
- Sport: Gaelic football
- Position: Centre-forward
Club
- Years: Club
- Dr. Crokes
Club titles
- Kerry titles: 7
- Munster titles: 5
- All-Ireland Titles: 1
College
- Years: College
- University College Cork
College titles
- Sigerson titles: 1
Inter-county*
Years	County	Apps (scores)
2011-2018	Cork	0 (0-00)
Inter-county titles
- Munster titles: 4
- All-Irelands: 1
- NFL: 0
- All Stars: 0
- *Inter County team apps and scores correct as of 22:32, 2 May 2021.

Daithí Casey (born March 1990) is an Irish Gaelic footballer who plays for club side Dr. Crokes. He has also lined out with University College Cork and at inter-county level with the Kerry senior football team. He usually lines out in the forwards.

== Honours ==
University College Cork

- Sigerson Cup: 2011
- Cork Senior Football Championship: 2011

Dr. Crokes

- All-Ireland Senior Club Football Championship: 2017
- Munster Senior Club Football Championship: 2011, 2012, 2013, 2016, 2018
- Kerry Senior Football Championship: 2010, 2011, 2012, 2013, 2016, 2017, 2018, 2024.

Kerry

- All-Ireland Senior Football Championship: 2014
- Munster Senior Football Championship: 2011, 2014, 2015, 2018
- Munster Minor Football Championship: 2008
