= 2014 Cork Premier Intermediate Hurling Championship =

- Dates: 24 May 2014 – 12 October 2014
- Teams: 16
- Champions: Ballyhea (1st title); Timmy Shanahan (captain); Jimmy Quilty (manager)
- Runners-up: Newcestown; Daniel Twomey (captain); Eugene Desmond (manager)
- Relegated: Kilbrittain

Tournament statistics
- Matches played: 29
- Goals scored: 65 (2.24 per match)
- Points scored: 862 (29.72 per match)
- Top scorer(s): Adrian Mannix (0-43)

The 2014 Cork Premier Intermediate Hurling Championship was the 11th staging of the Cork Premier Intermediate Hurling Championship since its establishment by the Cork County Board in 2004. The draw for the opening round of the championship took place at the County Convention on 15 December 2013. The championship began on 24 May 2014 and ended on 12 October 2014.

On 16 August 2014, Kilbrittain were relegated from the championship following a 1-16 to 1-22 defeat by Watergrasshill.

On 12 October 2014, Ballyhea won the championship following a 1-17 to 0-16 defeat of Newcestown in the final. This remains their only championship title in the grade.

Kilworth's Adrian Mannix was the championship's top scorer with 0-43.

== Teams ==
A total of 16 teams contested the Premier Intermediate Championship, including 14 teams from the 2013 premier intermediate championship, one relegated from the 2013 senior championship and one promoted from the 2013 intermediate championship.

== Team changes ==
=== To Championship ===
Promoted from the Cork Intermediate Hurling Championship

- Kanturk

Relegated from the Cork Senior Hurling Championship

- Ballinhassig

=== From Championship ===
Promoted to the Cork Senior Hurling Championship

- Youghal

Relegated to the Cork Intermediate Hurling Championship

- Ballincollig

== Results ==
=== Round 1 ===
24 May 2014 Round 1	Ballyhea	1-25 – 2-10	Mallow	Fr. Con Buckley Park, Buttevant
	P O’Callaghan (0-11, 8fs, 1 65), J Morrissey (1-3), N Ronan (1f), and E O’Leary (0-4 each), D Copps, I Curtin and K Morrissey (0-1 each).	Report	S Hayes (1-8, 7fs), C Stokes (1-0), P Herlihy and M Maher (0-1 each).	Referee: B Murphy (Carrigtwohill)

24 May 2014 Round 1	Kilbrittain	1-08 – 2-14	Newcestown	Charlie Hurley Park, Bandon
	J Wall 1-3 (0-3f), A Hayes, D Desmond, J Deasy, M Sexton, R Cashman 0-1 each.	Report	F Keane 2-2, E Kelly 0-5 (3f), T Horgan 0-4, T Twomey, D Twomey, L Meade 0-1 each.

31 May 2014 Round 1	Tracton	2-18 – 2-19	Ballinhassig	Páirc Uí Rinn, Cork
	R Walsh 0-9, J Kingston 1-2, J Good 1-1, S Brick 0-4, S O'Sullivan 0-1, G Kinsgton 0-1.		P Collins 1-6, F O'Leary 0-8, J O'Callaghan 1-0, C Lyons 0-3, M Collins 0-2.	Referee: C Lyons (Nemo Rangers)

31 May 2014 Round 1	Carrigaline	3-15 – 2-16	Kilworth	Mallow GAA Complex, Mallow
	K McIntyre 2-4, R O'Shea 1-4, D Drake 0-4, S O'Regan 0-2, W O'Brien 0-1.		A Mannix 0-13, W Condon 1-1, N McNamara 1-0, L Whelan 0-1, N O'Brien 0-1.	Referee: D O'Leary (Watergrasshill)

1 June 2014 Round 1	Castlelyons	2-12 – 0-12	Watergrasshill	Rathcormac
	A Fenton 2-0, A Spillane 0-5, R Bransfield 0-2, C Barry 0-2, L Sexton 0-1, C McGann 0-1, B Fitzgerald 0-1.		S O'Regan 0-5, E Barry 0-2, P Cahill 0-2, S O'Callaghan 0-1, J Foley 0-1, B Halbert 0-1.	Referee: M O'Mahony (Kilbrittain)

1 June 2014 Round 1	Bandon	0-15 – 1-11 (aet)	Inniscarra	Brinny
	R Crowley 0-9, D Crowley 0-2, P Crowley 0-1, J Hickey 0-1, P Murphy 0-1, C O'Mahony 0-1.		C Buckley 1-0, D O'Connell 0-3, K Rice 0-2, S O'Callaghan 0-1, J Roche 0-1, C Casey 0-1, T Murphy 0-1, S O'Donoghue 0-1, J Olden 0-1.	Referee: N Wall (Carrigaline)

1 June 2014 Round 1	Cloyne	3-17 – 0-13	Valley Rovers	Páirc Uí Rinn, Cork
	D O'Sullivan 1-7, K Dennehy 1-3, P O'Sullivan 0-4, C Cusack 1-0, C O'Sullivan 0-2, D Cahill 0-1.		R Butler 0-10, K Canty 0-3.	Referee: D Copps (Ballyhea)

23 June 2014 Round 1	Kanturk	1-24 – 0-22	Blarney	Mallow GAA Complex, Mallow
	L McLoughlin 1-8, A Walsh 0-4, I Walsh 0-4, L O'Neill 0-3, W Murphy 0-2, D Kenneally 0-1, A Nash 0-1, J Healy 0-1.		M Cremin 0-9, P O'Driscoll 0-3, B O'Connell 0-2, C Murphy 0-2, JD Good 0-1, R Murphy 0-1, J Barrett 0-1, P Hallissey 0-1, P Philpott 0-1, D Dunlea 0-1.	Referee: D O'Leary (Watergrasshill)

=== Round 2 ===
22 June 2014 Round 2	Kilworth	2-12 – 2-13	Mallow	Páirc Mac Gearailt, Fermoy
	A Mannix 0-8, N McNamara 1-1, N O'Brien 1-0, W Condon 0-2, J Cahill 0-1.		S Hayes 1-8, A Sheehan 1-0, A Luttrell 0-1, K O'Connor 0-1, P Herlihy 0-1, P Healy 0-1, Y Browne 0-1.	Referee: P O'Driscoll (Bride Rovers)

28 June 2014 Round 2	Inniscarra	4-19 – 1-24 (aet)	Watergrasshill	Páirc Uí Rinn, Cork
	D O'Connell 2-2, S O'Callaghan 2-1, C Casey 0-7, T O'Connor 0-6, K Rice 0-1, P Farmer 0-1, D O'Keeffe 0-1.		S O'Regan 0-8, B Halbert 1-3, J Halbert 0-5, P Cahill 0-3, J Foley 0-1, E Barry 0-1, A Cronin 0-1, P O'Regan 0-1, W Connolly 0-1.	Referee: J Sexton (Ballyhea)

28 June 2014 Round 2	Kilbrittain	1-07 – 2-17	Valley Rovers	Páirc Uí Ríogáin, Ballinspittle
	A Hayes 1-1, D Harrington 0-2, T Harrington 0-1, C O'Leary 0-1, C Hickey 0-1, M Sexton 0-1.		K Canty 2-2, C O'Leary 0-5, R Butler 0-4, E O'Reilly 0-4, E Manning 0-1, E Collins 0-1.	Referee: M Maher (St. Finbarr's)

12 July 2014 Round 2	Blarney	1-16 – 0-15	Tracton	Páirc Uí Rinn, Cork
	M Cremin 0-8, P O'Driscoll 1-2, M O'Leary 0-3, B O'Connell 0-2, B Hurley 0-1.		R Walsh 0-5, S Brick 0-5, C McGuinness 0-1, K Lynch 0-1, M O'Sullivan 0-1, D O'Callaghan 0-1, S O'Sullivan 0-1.	Referee: K Murphy (Nemo Rangers)

=== Round 3 ===
19 July 2014 Round 3	Tracton	1-19 – 0-17	Watergrasshill	Páirc Uí Rinn, Cork
	R Walsh 0-11, S Brick 0-6, F Lynch 1-0, S O'Sullivan 0-1, K Lynch 0-1.		S O'Regan 0-9, P Cahill 0-3, S O'Callaghan 0-2, K Coakley 0-1, P O'Regan 0-1, E Barry 0-1.	Referee: J Larkin (Douglas)

19 July 2014 Round 3	Kilbrittain	0-14 – 0-23	Kilworth	Caherlag
	R Cashman 0-8, D Harrington 0-2, David Desmond 0-1, C Hickey 0-1, A Hayes 0-1, P O'Mahony 0-1.		A Mannix 0-8, J Cahill 0-4, L Whelan 0-4, N McNamara 0-3, B Tobin 0-2, W Condon 0-2.	Referee: K Murphy (Nemo Rangers)

=== Relegation play-off ===
16 August 2014 Play-off	Kilbrittain	1-16 – 1-22	Watergrasshill	Riverstown
	R Cashman 1-6, C Hickey 0-2, P O'Mahony 0-2, D Desmond 0-2, C Moloney 0-1, A Hayes 0-1, T Harrington 0-1, J Hurley 0-1.		S O'Regan 1-11, K Coakley 0-2, A Cronin 0-2, S O'Callaghan 0-2, P Cahill 0-2, D O'Farrell 0-1, J Foley 0-1, D O'Callaghan 0-1.	Referee: D Daly (Brian Dillons)

=== Round 4 ===
1 August 2014 Round 4	Mallow	0-08 – 1-16	Valley Rovers	Páirc Uí Rinn, Cork
	S Hayes 0-4, C Murphy 0-1, P Herlihy 0-1, A Sheehan 0-1, R Downey 0-1.		R Butler 0-7, E O'Reilly 1-3, B Crowley 0-2, K Canty 0-2, J Hurley 0-1, C O'Leary 0-1.	Referee: B Murphy (Carrigtwohill)

2 August 2014 Round 4	Carrigaline	1-12 – 2-22	Newcestown	Brinny
	R O'Shea 0-8, T Murphy 1-1, K McIntyre 0-2, S O'Brien 0-1.		E Kelly 0-9, T Horgan 2-1, T Twomey 0-3, S Ryan 0-3, D Twomey 0-3, L Meade 0-2, F Keane 0-1.	Referee: D Daly (Brian Dillons)

9 August 2014 Round 4	Blarney	1-08 – 1-09	Ballinhassig	Cloughduv
	M Cremin 0-6, O O'Connor 1-0, P Hallissey 0-1, P O'Driscoll 0-1.		P Collins 0-8, F O'Leary 1-0, D O'Sullivan 0-1.	Referee: B Murphy (Carrigtwohill)

15 August 2014 Round 4	Kilworth	2-13 – 1-12	Inniscarra	Páirc Uí Rinn, Cork
	N McNamara 2-0, A Mannix 0-6, B Tobin 0-3, L Whelan 0-2, J Cahill 0-1, W Condon 0-1.		T O'Connor 0-5, D O'Connell 1-1, C Casey 0-2, J Roche 0-2, D O'Keeffe 0-2.	Referee: M Maher (St. Finbarr's)

23 August 2014 Round 4	Bandon	1-15 – 4-14	Cloyne	Páirc Uí Rinn, Cork
	R Crowley 0-12, M Sugrue 1-1, D Lucey 0-1, C O'Mahony 0-1.		Diarmuid O'Sullivan 1-2, K Dennehy 1-2, D Cahill 1-1, C O'Sullivan 1-1, P O'Sullivan 0-4, C Smith 0-2, A Walsh 0-1, I Cahill 0-1.	Referee: D Daly (Brian Dillons)

30 August 2014 Round 4	Kanturk	1-18 – 2-13	Tracton	Páirc Uí Rinn, Cork
	L McLoughlin 0-9, D Kenneally 1-3, L O'Neill 0-3, A Walsh 0-1, I Walsh 0-1, J Fitzpatrick 0-1.		S Brick 1-6, R Walsh 1-4, S O'Sullivan 0-2, M O'Sullivan 0-1.	Referee: M O'Mahony (Kilbrittain)

=== Quarter-final ===
30 August 2014 Quarter-final	Ballyhea	0-15 – 1-12	Castlelyons	Moore Park, Kilworth
	P O'Callaghan 0-5, G Morrissey 0-4, E O'Leary 0-2, N Ronan 0-2, J Morrissey 0-1, T Shanahan 0-1.		A Spillane 0-5, C Spillane 1-1, A Fenton 0-3, E Maye 0-1, P Mahon 0-1, C O'Leary 0-1.	Referee: N Wall (Carrigaline)

31 August 2014 Quarter-final	Newcestown	0-16 – 0-11	Valley Rovers
	E Kelly 0-8, L Meade 0-3, T Horgan 0-2, S Ryan 0-1, D Heffernan 0-1, T Twomey 0-1.		R Butler 0-6, C O'Leary 0-3, D Looney 0-1, E O'Reilly 0-1.	Referee: J Sexton (Ballyhea)

6 September 2014 Quarter-final	Kilworth	1-16 – 0-21	Kanturk	Páirc Uí Rinn, Cork
	A Mannix 0-8, L Whelan 0-4, N McNamara 1-0, K Walsh 0-2, N Tobin 0-1, W Condon 0-1.		L McLoughlin 0-12, D Kenneally 0-3, A Walsh 0-2, A Nash 0-1, W Murphy 0-1, L O'Keeffe 0-1, L O'Neill 0-1.	Referee: S Crowley (Argideen Rangers)

13 September 2014 Quarter-final	Ballinhassig	0-12 – 2-12	Cloyne	Páirc Uí Chaoimh, Cork
	F O'Leary 0-5, P Collins 0-4, D O'Sullivan 0-2, D O'Callaghan 0-1.		D O'Sullivan 1-7, K Dennehy 1-0, Paudie O'Sullivan 0-2, Paul O'Sullivan 0-1, A Walsh 0-1, D Cahill 0-1.	Referee: D Copps (Ballyhea)

14 September 2014 Quarter-final replay	Ballyhea	2-13 – 1-07	Castlelyons	Moore Park, Kilworth
	N Ronan 0-5, M O'Sullivan 1-1, K Morrissey 1-1, P O'Callaghan 0-4, G O'Leary 0-2.		C Spillane 1-0, A Spillane 0-2, R Bransfield 0-2, D Lawlor 0-1, C Barry 0-1, T Carroll 0-1.	Referee: M Maher (St. Finbarr's)

=== Semi-final ===
20 September 2014 Semi-final	Cloyne	2-10 – 0-18	Ballyhea	Páirc Uí Rinn, Cork
	A Walsh 1-3, D O'Sullivan 1-2, I Cahill 0-2, P O'Sullivan 0-1, D Cahill 0-1, C O'Sullivan 0-1.		N Ronan 0-12, P O'Callaghan 0-3, E O'Leary 0-2, D Copps 0-1.	Referee: J Larkin (Douglas)

28 September 2014 Semi-final	Newcestown	0-12 – 0-09	Kanturk	Coachford
	D Twomey 0-5 (2f); E Kelly 0-4 (3f); L Meade 0-2; J Meade 0-1	Report	L McLoughlin (0-5 (3f), A Nash (1f), A Walsh, J Healy, S Walsh 0-1 each.	Referee: M Maher (St. Finbarr's)

=== Final ===
12 October 2014 Final	Ballyhea	1-17 – 0-16	Newcestown	Páirc Uí Chaoimh, Cork
	P O’Callaghan (0-5), J Morrissey (1-2), E O’Leary, N Ronan (3fs) (0-3 each), G Morrissey (0-2), E Morrissey, E Rea (0-1 each).	Report	D Twomey 0-6 (4fs, 1 65), E Kelly (0-3fs), T Twomey, C Keane (0-2 each), F Keane, T Horgan, C O’Neill (0-1 each).	Referee: M Maher (St. Finbarr's)

== Championship statistics ==
=== Scoring events ===
- Widest winning margin: 13 points
  - Cloyne 3-17 – 0-13 Valley Rovers (Round 1)
  - Valley Rovers 2-17 – 1-07 Kilbrittain (Round 2)
  - Newcestown 2-22 – 1-12 Carrigaline (Round 4)
- Most goals in a match: 5
  - Carrigaline 3-15 – 2-16 Kilworth (Round 1)
  - Inniscarra 4-19 – 1-24 Watergrasshill (Round 2)
  - Cloyne 4-14 – 1-15 Bandon (Round 4)
- Most points in a match: 46
  - Kanturk 1-24 – 0-22 Blarney (Round 1)
- Most goals by one team in a match: 4
  - Inniscarra 4-19 – 1-24 Watergrasshill (Round 2)
  - Cloyne 4-14 – 1-15 Bandon (Round 4)
- Most goals scored by a losing team: 2
  - Mallow 2-10 – 1-25 Ballyhea (Round 1)
  - Tracton 2-18 – 2-19 Ballinhassig (Round 1)
  - Kilworth 2-16 – 3-15 Carrigaline (Round 1)
  - Kilworth 2-12 – 2-13 Mallow (Round 2)
  - Tracton 2-13 – 1-18 Kanturk (Round 4)
  - Cloyne 2-10 – 0-18 Ballyhea (Semi-final)
- Most points scored by a losing team: 24
  - Watergrasshill 1-24 – 4-19 Inniscarra (Round 2)

=== Top scorers ===
Top scorer overall

Rank	Player	Club	Tally	Total	Matches	Average
1	Adrian Mannix	Kilworth	0-43	43	5	8.60
2	Lorcán McLoughlin	Kanturk	1-34	37	4	9.25
3	Ronan Walsh	Tracton	1-29	32	4	8.60
4	Diarmuid O'Sullivan	Cloyne	4-18	30	4	7.50
5	Eoin Kelly	Newcestown	0-29	29	5	5.80
6	Pa O'Callaghan	Ballyhea	0-28	28	5	5.60
7	Richie Butler	Carrigaline	0-27	27	4	6.75
8	Seán Hayes	Mallow	2-20	26	3	8.33
8	Neil Ronan	Ballyhea	0-26	26	5	5.20
9	Shane Brick	Tracton	1-21	24	4	6.00

Top scorers in a single game

Rank	Player	Club	Tally	Total	Opposition
1	Adrian Mannix	Kilworth	0-13	13	Carrigaline
2	Ronan Crowley	Bandon	0-12	12	Cloyne
2	Lorcán McLoughlin	Kanturk	0-12	12	Kilworth
2	Neil Ronan	Ballyhea	0-12	12	Cloyne
3	Seán Hayes	Mallow	1-08	11	Ballyhea
3	Lorcán McLoughlin	Kanturk	1-08	11	Blarney
3	Seán Hayes	Mallow	1-08	11	Kilworth
3	Pa O'Callaghan	Ballyhea	0-11	11	Mallow
3	Ronan Walsh	Tracton	0-11	11	Watergrasshill
4	Killian McIntyre	Carrigaline	2-04	10	Kilworth
4	Diarmuid O'Sullivan	Cloyne	1-07	10	Valley Rovers
4	Diarmuid O'Sullivan	Cloyne	1-07	10	Ballinhassig
4	Richie Butler	Valley Rovers	0-10	10	Cloyne

=== Miscellaneous ===
- As a result of winning the championship title, Ballyhea gained promotion to the Cork Senior Hurling Championship for the first time since 2003.
