= 2011 Cork Senior Football Championship =

Gaelic football competition

- Dates: 14 March 2011 – 16 October 2011
- Teams: 25
- Sponsor: Evening Echo
- Champions: University College Cork (10th title); Seán Kiely (captain); Paul O'Keeffe (manager)
- Runners-up: Castlehaven; Liam Collins (captain); James McCarthy (manager)
- Relegated: Valley Rovers

Tournament statistics
- Matches played: 41
- Top scorer(s): Cian O'Riordan (1-27)

The 2011 Cork Senior Football Championship was the 113th staging of the Cork Senior Football Championship since its establishment by the Cork County Board in 1887. The draw for the opening round fixtures took place on 11 December 2010. The championship began on 14 March 2011 and ended on 16 October 2011.

Nemo Rangers entered the championship as the defending champions, however, they were defeated by Avondhu at the quarter-final stage.

On 16 October 2011, University College Cork won the championship following a 1-12 to 0-10 defeat of Castlehaven in the final. This was their 10th championship title overall and their first title since 1999.

Avondhu's Cian O'Riordan was the championship's top scorer with 1-27.

== Team changes ==
=== To Championship ===
Promoted from the Cork Premier Intermediate Football Championship

- Newcestown

=== From Championship ===
Relegated to the Cork Premier Intermediate Football Championship

- Mallow

== Results ==
=== Divisional selection ===
==== Group 1 table ====
| | Team | Pld | W | D | L | SF | SA | SD | Pts |
|---|---|---|---|---|---|---|---|---|---|
| 1 | Carbery | 3 | 3 | 0 | 0 | 5-34 | 2-32 | 11 | 6 |
| 2 | Muskerry | 3 | 2 | 0 | 1 | 2-23 | 3-12 | 8 | 4 |
| 3 | Duhallow | 3 | 1 | 0 | 2 | 3-36 | 3-41 | -5 | 2 |
| 4 | Imokilly | 3 | 0 | 0 | 3 | 1-23 | 3-31 | -11 | 0 |

==== Group 1 results ====
| 14 March 2011 Phase 1 | Imokilly | 0-10 - 0-15 | Carbery | Páirc Uí Rinn, Cork |
| | P O'Sullivan 0-4, M Cussen 0-3, E Murphy 0-1, D Ryan 0-1, B McHugh 0-1. | | C O'Driscoll 0-3, M Cronin 0-3, D Barron 0-3, M Sugrue 0-2, K O'Donovan 0-1, A O'Connor 0-1, M Delaney 0-1, K Harrington 0-1. | Referee: J Dorgan (Nemo Rangers) |

| 16 March 2011 Phase 1 | Duhallow | 0-06 - 0-15 | Muskerry | Cloughduv |
| | M Dilworth 0-3, S Linehan 0-1, T Collins 0-1, S Murphy 0-1. | | D Goudling 0-7, L Shorten 0-2, D Ambrose 0-1, D O'Herlihy 0-1, N O'Leary 0-1, F Goold 0-1, A Concannon 0-1, D Ring 0-1. |

| 24 March 2011 Phase 2 | Imokilly | 1-13 - 3-16 | Duhallow | Mourne Abbey |
| | P O'Sullivan 0-6, M Horgan 1-0, M Cussen 0-3, E Murphy 0-2, D Ryan 0-1, J O'Mahony 0-1. | | D O'Connor 1-4, S Murphy 1-2, B Dennehy 1-2, N Fleming 0-4, M Dilworth 0-1, T Collins 0-1, M Herlihy 0-1, C O'Riordan 0-1. | Referee: J Dorgan (Nemo Rangers) |

| 25 March 2011 Phase 2 | Carbery | 3-06 - 2-08 | Muskerry | Cloughduv |
| | M Cronin 1-3, D O'Sullivan 1-0, J Wall 1-0, C O'Driscoll 0-1, K O'Driscoll 0-1, K Harrington 0-1. | | D Gould 1-3, D Goudling 1-3, D Ó Cróinín 0-1, L Seartan 0-1. | Referee: C Lyons (Nemo Rangers) |

| 28 March 2011 Phase 3 | Carbery | 2-13 - 0-14 | Duhallow | Cloughduv |
| | D O'Sullivan 2-0, R Deane 0-4, C O'Driscoll 0-3, D Barron 0-2, D McSweeney 0-2, M Sugrue 0-1, K O'Driscoll 0-1. | | M Dilworth 0-4, M Herlihy 0-3, B Dennehy 0-3, J Lane 0-2, N Fleming 0-1, S Murphy 0-1. | Referee: J Bermingham (Bride Rovers) |

| 28 March 2011 Phase 3 | Muskerry | w/o - scr. | Imokilly | Páirc Uí Rinn, Cork |

==== Group 2 table ====
| | Team | Pld | W | D | L | SF | SA | SD | Pts |
|---|---|---|---|---|---|---|---|---|---|
| 1 | Avondhu | 2 | 2 | 0 | 0 | 4-29 | 2-14 | 21 | 4 |
| 2 | Beara | 2 | 1 | 0 | 1 | 0-08 | 2-13 | -11 | 2 |
| 3 | Seandún | 2 | 0 | 0 | 2 | 2-06 | 2-16 | -10 | 0 |

==== Group 2 results ====
| 14 March 2011 Phase 1 | Avondhu | 2-13 - 0-08 | Beara | Sam Maguire Park, Dunmanway |
| | C O'Neill 2-5, D O'Mahony 0-3, C O'Riordan 0-2, P O'Flynn 0-1, H Dockery 0-1, T Monaghan 0-1. | | D Murphy 0-4, V Lehane 0-2, D Harrington 0-1, Liam Harrington 0-1. | Referee: P O'Leary (Kilmurry) |

| 24 March 2011 Phase 2 | Avondhu | 2-16 - 2-06 | Seandún | Mallow GAA Complex, Mallow |
| | C O'Riordan 1-4, E O'Connor 1-2, F O'Shea 0-3, H Dockery 0-2, T Monaghan 0-2, D O'Mahony 0-1, C O'Sullivan 0-1, J O'Shea 0-1. | | C McCarthy 0-3, C Buckley 1-0, T Hornibrook 1-0, E Buckley 0-1, B Hegarty 0-1, J Keegan 0-1. | Referee: C Lane (Banteer) |

| 28 March 2011 Phase 3 | Beara | w/o - scr. | Seandún | Sam Maguire Park, Dunmanway |

==== Knock-out stage ====
| 18 April 2011 | Cork Institute of Technology | 0-14 - 0-17 (aet) | Avondhu | Fitzgerald Park, Fermoy |
| | K Hallissey 0-6, J Walsh 0-4, A O'Brien 0-2, S Kelleher 0-1, P Joy 0-1. | | C O'Riordan 0-7, T Monaghan 0-4, P Flynn 0-1, P Kissane 0-1, H Dockery 0-1, C O'Sullivan 0-1, E O'Connor 0-1, E Stanton 0-1. | Referee: G Sweeney (Glenville) |

| 26 April 2011 | University College Cork | 1-20 - 3-11 (aet) | Carbery | Cloughduv |
| | S Beston 0-5, E Buckley 1-1, P Geaney 0-4, D Casey 0-3, S Kiely 0-3, J Buckley 0-2, W Kennedy 0-1, D O'Shea 0-1. | | R Deane 2-0, M Cronin 1-2, C O'Driscoll 0-4, D Barron 0-2, K O'Driscoll 0-1, M Sugrue 0-1, D McSweeney 0-1. |

=== Round 1 ===
| 6 May 2011 Round 1 | Carbery Rangers | 1-19 - 1-17 | Ilen Rovers | John William Park, Leap |
| | J Hayes 1-7, J Murphy 0-3, Séamus Hayes 0-3, J O'Rourke 0-2, M Mennis 0-2, S Murray 0-1, P Hicks 0-1. | | K O'Sullivan 1-7, A Holland 0-7, B Duggan 0-1, C O'Driscoll 0-1, D Coughlan 0-1. | Referee: C Lane (Banteer) |

| 7 May 2011 Round 1 | Valley Rovers | 0-10 - 0-11 | Aghada | Páirc Uí Rinn, Cork |
| | H O'Donovan 0-2, F Lynch 0-2, E Collins 0-2, D Collins 0-1, G Farrell 0-1, J Walsh 0-1, E Manning 0-1. | | C Fleming 0-8, P O'Neill 0-2, M Russell 0-1. | Referee: C Lyons (Nemo Rangers) |

| 7 May 2011 Round 1 | Clonakilty | 2-09 - 1-14 (aet) | O'Donovan Rossa | Rosscarbery |
| | H Kenny 1-1, T Anglin 1-0, B O'Mahony 0-3, C O'Donovan 0-3, D Lyons 0-1, M O'Brien 0-1. | | C McCarthy 1-1, E Hodnett 0-4, D Óg Hodnett 0-3, C Crowley 0-2, R Long 0-1, R Price 0-1, G Minihane 0-1, T Hegarty 0-1. | Referee: C Lane (Banteer) |

| 7 May 2011 Round 1 | Nemo Rangers | 0-12 - 1-07 | Ballincollig | Ovens |
| | B O'Driscoll 0-5, P Kerrigan 0-2, L Connolly 0-2, J Kerins 0-1, A Cronin 0-1, S O'Brien 0-1. | | J Kelly 1-1, P Kelly 0-3, F Keohane 0-1, B Cotter 0-1, N Ahern 0-1. | Referee: J Bermingham (Bride Rovers) |

| 7 May 2011 Round 1 | Na Piarsaigh | 1-03 - 0-07 | Douglas | Páirc Uí Rinn, Cork |
| | G Noonan 1-0, J Gardiner 0-3. | | F Desmond 0-3, M Harrington 0-2, C Dineen 0-1, O Mulrooney 0-1. | Referee: G Sweeney (Glanville) |

| 8 May 2011 Round 1 | St. Nicholas' | 0-07 - 3-16 | Castlehaven | Charlie Hurley Park, Bandon |
| | R Brosnan 0-4, David Brosnan 0-2, G Callanan 0-1. | | M Collins 1-6, B Collins 1-2, S Cahalane 0-5, S Dineen 1-0, D Hegarty 0-1, A Cahalane 0-1, B Hurley 0-1. | Referee: G Harrington (Carrigaline) |

| 8 May 2011 Round 1 | St. Finbarr's | 0-13 - 0-11 | Newcetsown | Páirc Liam Mhic Cárthaigh, Ballygarvan |
| | R O'Mahony 0-5, C O'Sullivan 0-3, R Curran 0-2, R Leahy 0-2, C McCarthy 0-1. | | B Horgan 0-3, T Twomey 0-3, E Kelly 0-1, D Twomey 0-1, H Curran 0-1, D Heffernan 0-1, F Keane 0-1. | Referee: N Barrett (Carrigtwohill) |

| 8 May 2011 Round 1 | Dohenys | 1-07 - 2-07 | Bishopstown | Charlie Hurley Park, Bandon |
| | D Healy 1-1, J McCarthy 0-3, P McCarthy 0-1, M Milner 0-1, M Farr 0-1. | | D O'Donovan 1-4, P Cronin 1-0, P O'Connor 0-3. | Referee: G Harrington (Carrigaline) |

=== Round 2 ===
| 12 June 2011 Round 2 | Clonakilty | 0-12 - 0-09 | Valley Rovers | Páirc Uí Ríogáin, Ballinspittle |
| | C O'Donovan 0-5, B O'Mahony 0-3, T Clancy 0-1, D Horan 0-1, D Lyons 0-1, M O'Brien 0-1. | | F Lynch 0-4, H O'Donovan 0-3, E Collins 0-1, J Burke 0-1. | Referee: J Bermingham (Bride Rovers) |

| 18 June 2011 Round 2 | Ilen Rovers | 1-11 - 0-09 (aet) | Dohenys | Rossa Park, Skibbereen |
| | D Mac Eoin 1-4, K O'Sullivan 0-4, A Holland 0-2, C O'Driscoll 0-1. | | Jer McCarthy 0-7, D Farr 0-1, D O'Sullivan 0-1. | Referee: J Dorgan (Nemo Rangers) |

| 19 June 2011 Round 2 | Newcestown | 2-09 - 1-07 | St. Nicholas' | Brinny Sportsfield, Brinny |
| | B Horgan 1-5, T Twomey 1-1, H Curran 0-2, E Kelly 0-1. | | T Spain 1-1, R Brennan 0-3, D Goggin 0-2, E Kearney 0-1. | Referee: C Lane (Banteer) |

| 20 June 2011 Round 2 | Ballincollig | 1-20 - 1-06 | Na Piarsaigh | Cloughduv |
| | J Miskella 1-5, F Keohane 0-4, P Kelly 0-4, B Cotter 0-2, C O'Sullivan 0-2, C O'Connor 0-1, N Allen 0-1, JP Murphy 0-1. | | S Duggan 0-4, A Keating 1-0, S Glasgow 0-1, J Gardiner 0-1. | Referee: M Collins (CLonakilty) |

=== Round 3 ===
| 26 June 2011 Round 3 | St. Nicholas' | 2-06 - 1-08 | Dohenys | Charlie Hurley Park, Bandon |
| | G Callanan 1-2, B O'Donovan 1-0, R Brosnan 0-2, T Spain 0-2, Deam Brosnan 0-1. | | J O'Connell 1-1, D McCarthy 0-2, D O'Sullivan 0-2, T Collins 0-1, M Murphy 0-1, P McCarthy 0-1. | Referee: J Berminghan (Bride Rovers) |

| 11 July 2011 Round 3 | Na Piarsaigh | 1-07 - 0-08 | Valley Rovers | Riverstick Sportsfield, Riverstick |
| | A Brady 1-0, S Duggan 0-3, S Glasgow 0-2, C O'Mahony 0-1, C O'Donovan 0-1. | | F Lynch 0-4, J Walsh 0-2, K Buckley 0-1, H O'Donovan 0-1. | Referee: P O'Leary (Kilmurry) |

=== Relegation play-off ===
| 3 September 2011 Play-off | Dohenys | 2-11 - 0-04 | Valley Rovers | Kilmichael |
| | J O'Connell 2-1, D Healy 0-3, D O'Sullivan 0-2, P Collins 0-1, S Collins 0-1, J McCarthy 0-1, M Murphy 0-1, T Collins 0-1. | | F Lynch 0-3, R Lehane 0-1. | Referee: J Bermingham (Bride Rovers) |

=== Round 4 ===
| 6 August 2011 Round 4 | St. Finbarr's | 3-14 - 1-12 | Na Piarsaigh | Páirc Uí Rinn, Cork |
| | R Leahy 0-5, M Shields 1-1, C O'Sullivan 1-0, E Keane 1-0, R O'Mahony 0-3, R Curran 0-1, C McCarthy 0-1, J O'Donoghue 0-1, N Horgan 0-1, J Fitzpatrick 0-1. | | J Gardiner 1-3, S Duggan 0-5, M Prendergats 0-1, P Gould 0-1, D Mannix 0-1, S Glasgow 0-1. | Referee: J Bermingham (Bride Rovers) |

| 6 August 2011 Round 4 | O'Donovan Rossa | 0-11 - 1-11 | Castlehaven | John William Park, Leap |
| | D Óg Hodnett 0-4, C McCarthy 0-2, E Hodnett 0-2, R McCarthy 0-1, R Long 0-1, C Crowley 0-1. | | M Collisn 0-4, B Collins 1-0, P Hurley 0-2, B Hurley 0-2, S Dineen 0-1, S Cahalane 0-1, R Whelton 0-1. | Referee: J Dorgan (Nemo Rangers) |

| 7 August 2011 Round 4 | Clonakilty | 2-13 - 1-12 | Ilen Rovers | Rosscarbery |
| | T Clancy 2-1, C O'Donovan 0-4, C Murphy 0-2, G Barry 0-2, T Anglin 0-1, B O'Mahony 0-1, J Leahy 0-1, D O'Regan 0-1. | | K O'Sullivan 1-5, Conor O'Driscoll 0-3, A Holland 0-2, Cian O'Driscoll 0-1, K Daly 0-1. | Referee: J Bermingham (Bride Rovers) |

| 7 August 2011 Round 4 | Avondhu | 0-10 - 0-10 | Aghada | Castlelyons |
| | T O'Shea 0-3, K Sheehan 0-2, T Monaghan 0-2, C O'Riordan 0-2, H Dockery 0-1. | | C Fleming 0-6, M Russell 0-2, J O'Shea 0-1, P O'Neill 0-1. | Referee: P O'Leary (Kilmurry) |

| 7 August 2011 Round 4 | Nemo Rangers | 1-08 - 0-10 | Douglas | Páirc Uí Rinn, Cork |
| | J Masters 0-4, S O'Brien 1-0, D Mehigan 0-1, A Cronin 0-1, P Kerrigan 0-1, L Connolly 0-1. | | M Harrington 0-5, J Lane 0-1, K Murphy 0-1, J Farrell 0-1, F Desmond 0-1, A Cadogan 0-1. | Referee: N Barrett (Carrigtwohill) |

| 7 August 2011 Round 4 | Carbery Rangers | 0-09 - 1-04 | Ballincollig | Kilmichael |
| | S Hayes 0-5, J Hayes 0-2, K McMahon 0-1, M O'Sullivan 0-1. | | J Miskella 1-0, P Kelly 0-2, C O'Sullivan 0-1, JP Murphy 0-1. | Referee: J Dorgan (Nemo Rangers) |

| 8 August 2011 Round 4 | Bishopstown | 0-06 - 0-08 | Newcestown | Ovens |
| | P O'Connor 0-1, P Curran 0-1, D O'Donovan 0-1, D Crowley 0-1, M Driscoll 0-1. | | B Horgan 0-4, C Keane 0-1, H Curran 0-1, D Twomey 0-1, T Twomey 0-1. | Referee: N Barrett (Carrigtwohill) |

| 14 August 2011 Round 4 | St. Nicholas' | 2-09 - 2-11 | University College Cork | Páirc Uí Rinn, Cork |
| | R Brosnan 1-6, G Callanan 1-0, David Brosnan 0-1, E Kearney 0-1, B O'Donovan 0-1. | | R O'Hagan 1-1, W Kennedy 1-0, D Casey 0-3, M Griffin 0-2, N Daly 0-2, S Kiely 0-1, G O'Grady 0-1, J Buckley 0-1. | Referee: C Lane (Banteer) |

| 26 August 2011 Round 4 replay | Aghada | 1-06 - 0-16 | Avondhu | Castlelyons |
| | C Fleming 1-2, B Crowley 0-1, P O'Neill 0-1, T O'Neill 0-1, E Savage 0-1. | | C O'Riordan 0-8, P Kissane 0-2, K Sheehan 0-2, E O'Connor 0-1, T Monaghan 0-1, C O'Sullivan 0-1, D Hayes 0-1. | Referee: C Lyons (Nemo Rangers) |

=== Quarter-finals ===
| 20 August 2011 Quarter-final | Castlehaven | 2-09 - 1-07 | St. Finbarr's | Ahamilla Grounds, Clonakilty |
| | B Hurley 1-3, S Cahalane 1-0, P Hurley 0-2, M Collins 0-2, J Burns 0-1, S Dineen 0-1. | | D O'Leary 1-0, R O'Mahony 0-3, R Leahy 0-3, E Keane 0-1. | Referee: C Lane (Banteer) |

| 31 August 2011 Quarter-final | University College Cork | 2-13 - 2-09 | Clonakilty | Charlie Hurley Park, Bandon |
| | P Geaney 2-2, D Casey 0-4, J O'Sullivan 0-2, N Daly 0-1, S Kiely 0-1, S Beston 0-1, S O'Brien 0-1, B Coughlan 0-1. | | C Murphy 1-1, Timmy Anglin 1-0, B O'Mahony 0-3, C O'Donovan 0-2, D Murphy 0-1, D Lyons 0-1, M O'Brien 0-1. | Referee: P O'Leary (Kilmurry) |

| 3 September 2011 Quarter-final | Carbery Rangers | 0-12 - 1-09 | Newcestown | Ahamilla Grounds, Clonakilty |
| | J Hayes 0-5, J O'Rourke 0-2, B Shanahan 0-2, J Fitzpatrick 0-1, M O'Sullivan 0-1, S Hayes 0-1. | | B Horgan 0-5, H Curran 1-1, T Twomey 0-3. | Referee: N Barrett (Carrigtwohill) |

| 3 September 2011 Quarter-final | Nemo Rangers | 0-07 - 1-08 | Avondhu | Fitzgerald Park, Fermoy |
| | P Kerrigan 0-5, J Masters 0-1, A Cronin (Snr) 0-1. | | T Monaghan 1-3, C O'Riordan 0-3, P O'Flynn 0-1, C O'Sullivan 0-1. | Referee: G Sweeney (Glenville) |

| 10 September 2011 Quarter-final replay | Carbery Rangers | 0-11 - 0-06 | Newcestown | Ahamilla Grounds, Clonakilty |
| | J Hayes 0-6, J Fitzpatrick 0-2, B Shanahan 0-2, J O'Rourke 0-1. | | T Twomey 0-3, B Horgan 0-1, D Twomey 0-1, E Kelly 0-1. | Referee: C Lane (Banteer) |

=== Semi-finals ===
| 24 September 2011 Semi-final | Avondhu | 0-08 - 0-12 | University College Cork | Páirc Uí Rinn, Cork |
| | P Kissane 0-3, E O'Connor 0-3, C O'Riordan 0-1, T O'Shea 0-1. | | D Casey 0-5, P Geaney 0-3, M Griffin 0-1, JB Spillane 0-1, W Kennedy 0-1, N Daly 0-1. | Referee: M Collins (Clonakilty) |

| 24 September 2011 Semi-final | Castlehaven | 2-12 - 0-05 | Carbery Rangers | Páirc Uí Rinn, Cork |
| | B Hurley 1-4, M Collins 0-6, S Cahalane 1-0, B Collins 0-2. | | J Hayes 0-3, B Shanahan 0-1, S Murray 0-1. | Referee: C Lane (Banteer) |

=== Final ===
| 16 October 2011 Final | University College Cork | 1-12 - 0-10 | Castlehaven | Páirc Uí Chaoimh, Cork |
| | D Casey 1-4 (1-0 pen, 4fs), G O’Grady (1f), S Kiely 0-2 each, N Daly, J Buckley, M Griffin, P Geaney 0-1 each. | Report | M Collins 0-5 (3fs), C Hayes, D Burns, A Cahalane, S Cahalane, B Collins 0-1 each. | Attendance: 7,027; Referee: J Dorgan (Nemo Rangers) |

== Championship statistics ==
=== Top scorers ===
Top scorers overall

| Rank | Player | Club | Tally | Total | Matches | Average |
|---|---|---|---|---|---|---|
| 1 | Cian O'Riordan | Avondhu | 1-27 | 30 | 7 | 4.28 |
| 2 | Mark Collins | Castlehaven | 1-23 | 26 | 5 | 5.20 |
| 2 | John Hayes | Carbery Rangers | 1-23 | 26 | 5 | 5.20 |
| 3 | Kevin O'Sullivan | Ilen Rovers | 2-16 | 22 | 4 | 7.33 |
| 3 | Daithí Casey | UCC | 1-19 | 22 | 5 | 4.40 |
| 4 | Brian Horgan | Newcestown | 1-18 | 21 | 5 | 4.20 |
| 5 | Cian Fleming | Aghada | 1-16 | 19 | 3 | 6.33 |
| 6 | Robert Brosnan | Ilen Rovers | 1-15 | 18 | 4 | 6.50 |
| 7 | Paul Geaney | UCC | 2-10 | 16 | 4 | 4.00 |
| 7 | Brian Hurley | Castlehaven | 2-10 | 16 | 5 | 3.20 |
| 7 | Tom Monaghan | Avondhu | 1-13 | 16 | 6 | 2.66 |

Top scorers in a single game

| Rank | Player | Club | Tally | Total | Opposition |
|---|---|---|---|---|---|
| 1 | Colm O'Neill | Avondhu | 2-05 | 11 | Beara |
| 2 | John Hayes | Carbery Rangers | 1-07 | 10 | Ilen Rovers |
| 2 | Kevin O'Sullivan | Ilen Rovers | 1-07 | 10 | Carbery Rangers |
| 3 | Mark Collins | Castlehaven | 1-06 | 9 | St. Nicholas' |
| 3 | Robert Brosnan | St. Nicholas' | 1-06 | 9 | UCC |
| 4 | Paul Geaney | UCC | 2-02 | 8 | Clonakilty |
| 4 | Kevin O'Sullivan | Ilen Rovers | 1-05 | 8 | Clonakilty |
| 4 | Barry Horgan | Newcestown | 1-05 | 8 | St. Nicholas' |
| 4 | John Miskella | Ballincollig | 1-05 | 8 | Na Piarsaigh |
| 4 | Cian Fleming | Aghada | 0-08 | 8 | Valley Rovers |
| 4 | Cian O'Riordan | Avondhu | 0-08 | 8 | Aghada |

=== Miscellaneous ===
- University College Cork qualify for the final for the first time since 1999.
- University College Cork won the championship for the first time since 1999.
