= Lorcán McLoughlin =

Irish hurler (born 1989)

Personal information
- Native name: Lorcán Mac Lochlainn (Irish)
- Born: 14 November 1989 (age 36) Kanturk, County Cork, Ireland
- Occupation: Area manager
- Height: 6 ft 0 in (183 cm)

Sport
- Sport: Hurling
- Position: Centre-forward
Clubs
Years	Club	Apps (scores)
2006-present 2008 2009-2013 2014-2017	Kanturk → Duhallow → Cork Institute of Technology → Duhallow	5 (0-05); 1 (0-07); 18 (0-47; 10 (0-13)
Club titles
- Cork titles: 0
College
- Years: College
- 2008-2014: Cork Institute of Technology
College titles
- Fitzgibbon titles: 0
Inter-county*
Years	County	Apps (scores)
2010–2018	Cork	24 (0-08)
Inter-county titles
- Munster titles: 3
- All-Irelands: 0
- NHL: 0
- All Stars: 0
- *Inter County team apps and scores correct as of 18:05, 26 July 2018.

Lorcán McLoughlin (born 14 November 1989) is an Irish hurler who plays as a midfielder for club side Kanturk and is a former member of the Cork senior hurling team.

== Early life ==
McLoughlin was born in Kanturk, County Cork. His brother, John McLoughlin, has played Gaelic football for the Cork senior team.

== Playing career ==
=== Coláiste Treasa ===
In 2008 McLoughlin helped Coláiste Treasa to the Munster and All-Ireland vocational schools championships. In the All-Ireland semi-final McLoughlin recorded a personal tally of 2–10 in Coláiste Treasa's defeat of Bridgetown Vocational School.

=== Kanturk ===
McLoughlin joined the Kanturk club at a young age and played in all grades at juvenile and underage levels as a dual player. In 2009 he was a player with the Kanturk junior football team that defeated Rockchapel to win the Duhallow JAFC title. The Same year he won a Cork Under-21 Hurling Championship with divisional side Duhallow after a 0–18 to 1–05 defeat of Ballinhassig that gave McLoughlin a Under-21 championship medal. He won a second divisional title in 2011 after another defeat of Rockchapel in the final. On 11 November 2011, McLoughlin won a Cork Junior Championship medal following a 1–20 to 0–04 defeat of Mitchelstown in the final. He ended the game as man of the match.

On 3 November 2013, McLoughlin was at midfield when the Kanturk hurlers faced Éire Óg in the final of the Cork Intermediate Championship. He scored eleven points, including three frees and two 65s, in the 2–22 to 1–12 victory.

The 2017–18 season proved to be a hugely successful one for McLoughlin and the Kanturk club. After claiming a Cork Premier Intermediate Championship medal with the hurling team following a two-point defeat of Mallow in the final, he later won a Cork Intermediate Championship medal as a footballer following a 0–14 to 0–13 defeat of Mitchelstown in the final. McLoughlin later won a Munster medal with the hurlers after a 1–23 to 0-25 extra time defeat of Kilmaley. On 4 February 2018, he won an All-Ireland medal after scoring seven points in a 1–18 to 1–17 defeat of St Patrick's Ballyragget in the final.

=== Cork ===
==== Minor and under-21 ====
McLoughlin first played for Cork at minor level in 2007. A dual player with both the hurlers and Gaelic footballers, he won a Munster medal with the Cork minor football team when he was introduced as a blood sub in their 1–16 to 2–8 defeat of Kerry. On 2 September 2007 McLoughlin was at right wing-back when the Cork minor hurling team were defeated by Tipperary in the All-Ireland final.

McLoughlin subsequently joined the Cork under-21 teams as a dual player. After winning a Munster medal as a non-playing substitute with the Cork under-21 football team, McLoughlin was introduced as a substitute in Cork's 1–13 to 2–09 defeat of Down in the All-Ireland final on 4 May 2009.

==== Intermediate ====
McLoughlin was selected for the Cork intermediate team and made his debut on 21 June 2009. He later won a Munster medal in 2009 after a defeat of Waterford in the final. On 29 August 2009, McLoughlin won an All-Ireland medal after a 2–23 to 0–16 defeat of Kilkenny.

==== Senior ====
McLoughlin made his senior debut for Cork in a National Hurling League defeat of Offaly on 21 February 2010. He was later included on Cork's championship panel.

On 8 September 2013, McLoughlin lined out in his first All-Ireland final against Clare having earlier lost the Munster final to Limerick. Three second-half goals through Conor Lehane, Anthony Nash and Pa Cronin, and a tenth point of the game from Patrick Horgan gave Cork a one-point lead as injury time came to an end. A last-second point from corner-back Domhnall O'Donovan earned Clare a 0–25 to 3–16 draw. The replay on 28 September 2013 saw a hat-trick of goals by Clare's Shane O'Donnell, while further goals from Conor McGrath and Darach Honan secured a 5–16 to 3–16 victory for Clare.

On 13 July 2014, McLoughlin won his first Munster medal after a six-point defeat of Limerick in the final.

McLoughlin was a non-playing substitute when he won his second Munster medal following a 1–25 to 1–20 defeat of Clare in the final on 9 July 2017.

On 1 July 2018, McLoughlin won a third Munster medal after being introduced as a substitute after starting the game on the bench in Cork's 2–24 to 3-19 second successive defeat of Clare in the final.

McLoughlin announced his retirement from inter-county hurling on 13 November 2018.

=== Munster ===
McLoughlin has also been picked for duty with the Munster inter-provincial team, however, he never won a Railway Cup medal.

== Career statistics ==
=== Club ===
As of match played 26 September 2020.

Team	Year	Cork IHC		Munster		All-Ireland		Total	
Team	Year	Apps	Score	Apps	Score	Apps	Score	Apps	Score
Kanturk	2006	2	0-07	—		—		2	0-07
Kanturk	2007	3	0-24	—		—		2	0-24
Kanturk	2008	3	0-25	—		—		3	0-25
Kanturk	2009	3	0-17	—		—		3	0-17
Kanturk	2010	2	0-17	—		—		2	0-17
Kanturk	2011	3	0-24	—		—		3	0-24
Kanturk	2012	6	1-28	—		—		6	1-28
Kanturk	2013	5	1-32	—		—		5	1-32
Kanturk	Total	27	2-198	—		—		27	2-198
Kanturk	Year	Cork PIHC		Munster		All-Ireland		Total	
Kanturk	Year	Apps	Score	Apps	Score	Apps	Score	Apps	Score
Kanturk	2014	4	1-34	—		—		4	1-34
Kanturk	2015	4	0-02	—		—		4	0-02
Kanturk	2016	3	0-18	—		—		3	0-18
Kanturk	2017	5	3-18	3	0-07	3	1-14	11	4-39
Kanturk	Total	16	4-72	3	0-07	3	1-14	22	5-93
Kanturk	Year	Cork SHC		Munster		All-Ireland		Total	
Kanturk	Year	Apps	Score	Apps	Score	Apps	Score	Apps	Score
Kanturk	2018	3	0-03	—		—		3	0-03
Kanturk	2019	2	0-02	—		—		2	0-02
Kanturk	Total	5	0-05	—		—		5	0-05
Kanturk	Year	Cork SAHC		Munster		All-Ireland		Total	
Kanturk	Year	Apps	Score	Apps	Score	Apps	Score	Apps	Score
Kanturk	2020	5	2-26	—		—		5	2-26
Kanturk	Total	5	2-26	—		—		5	2-26
Career total		53	8-301	3	0-07	3	1-14	59	9-322

=== Division/college ===
Team	Year	Championship	
Team	Year	Apps	Score
Duhallow	2008	1	0-07
Duhallow	Total	1	0-07
Cork Institute of Technology	2009	3	0-03
Cork Institute of Technology	2010	3	0-04
Cork Institute of Technology	2011	4	0-18
Cork Institute of Technology	2012	6	0-16
Cork Institute of Technology	2013	2	0-06
Cork Institute of Technology	Total	18	0-47
Duhallow	2014	1	0-04
Duhallow	2015	2	0-02
Duhallow	2016	3	0-00
Duhallow	2017	4	0-07
Duhallow	Total	10	0-13
Career total		29	0-67

=== Inter-county ===
Team	Year	National League			Munster		All-Ireland		Total	
Team	Year	Division	Apps	Score	Apps	Score	Apps	Score	Apps	Score
Cork	2010	Division 1A	3	0-01	3	0-02	0	0-00	6	0-03
Cork	2011	Division 1A	5	0-01	1	0-00	1	0-00	7	0-01
Cork	2012	Division 1A	7	1-00	1	0-00	3	0-02	11	1-02
Cork	2013	Division 1A	6	0-06	1	0-00	4	0-04	11	0-10
Cork	2014	Division 1B	6	0-02	4	0-00	1	0-00	11	0-02
Cork	2015	Division 1A	6	0-01	0	0-00	1	0-00	7	0-01
Cork	2016	Division 1A	5	0-02	1	0-00	1	0-00	7	0-02
Cork	2017	Division 1A	4	0-01	1	0-00	0	0-00	5	0-01
Cork	2018	Division 1A	3	0-00	1	0-00	0	0-00	4	0-00
Total			45	1-14	13	0-02	11	0-06	69	1-22

== Honours ==
=== Team ===
Coláiste Treasa

- All-Ireland Vocational Schools Senior B Hurling Championship (1): 2008
- Munster Vocational Schools Senior B Hurling Championship (1): 2008

Kanturk

- All-Ireland Intermediate Club Hurling Championship (1): 2018
- Munster Intermediate Club Hurling Championship (1): 2017
- Cork Premier Intermediate Hurling Championship (1): 2017
- Cork Intermediate Football Championship (1): 2017
- Cork Intermediate Hurling Championship (1): 2013
- Cork Junior Football Championship (1): 2011
- Duhallow Junior A Football Championship (2): 2009, 2011

Duhallow

- Cork Under-21 Hurling Championship (1): 2009

Cork

- Munster Senior Hurling Championship (3): 2014, 2017, 2018
- All-Ireland Intermediate Hurling Championship (1): 2009
- Munster Intermediate Hurling Championship (1): 2009
- All-Ireland Under-21 Football Championship (1): 2009
- Munster Under-21 Football Championship (1): 2009
- Munster Minor Football Championship (1): 2007

=== Individual ===
Awards

- 96FM/C103 Sports Star of the Month (1): June 2010
