= 1955 Cork Junior Hurling Championship =

Irish hurling competition

- Teams: 7
- Champions: Ballyhea (2nd title)

The 1955 Cork Junior Hurling Championship was the 58th staging of the Cork Junior Hurling Championship since its establishment by the Cork County Board in 1895.

Ballyhea were awarded the title, after their final opponents, Aghabullogue, were suspended from the championship for fielding an illegal team against Castlelyons. It was Ballyhea's second championship title overall and a first championship title in 25 years.
