= 2013 Cork Intermediate Hurling Championship =

Irish hurling competition

- Dates: 1 June 2013 – 3 November 2013
- Teams: 16
- Sponsor: Evening Echo
- Champions: Kanturk (1st title); Anthony Nash (captain); Tim Burke (manager)
- Runners-up: Éire Óg; Alan O'Mahony (captain); Kevin Murray (manager)
- Relegated: Dromina

Tournament statistics
- Matches played: 29
- Goals scored: 74 (2.55 per match)
- Points scored: 810 (27.93 per match)
- Top scorer(s): Michael Walsh (4-25); Kevin Hallissey (1-34)

The 2013 Cork Intermediate Hurling Championship was the 104th staging of the Cork Intermediate Hurling Championship since its establishment by the Cork County Board in 1909. The draw for the opening round fixtures took place on 9 December 2012. The championship began on 1 June 2013 and ended on 3 November 2013.

On 3 November 2013, Kanturk won the championship following a 2-22 to 1-12 defeat of Éire Óg in the final at Páirc Uí Chaoimh. This was their first ever championship title.

Michel Walsh and Kevin Hallissey were the championship's joint top scorers.

== Team changes ==
=== To Championship ===
Promoted from the Cork Junior A Hurling Championship

- Kildorrery

Relegated from the Cork Premier Intermediate Hurling Championship

- Aghabullogue

=== From Championship ===
Promoted to the Cork Premier Intermediate Hurling Championship

- Kilworth

Relegated to the City Junior A Hurling Championship

- Blackrock

== Results ==
=== First round ===
1 June 2013 First round	Charleville	2-15 - 3-11	Argideen Rangers	Páirc Eoin Mhic Charthaigh
	A Cagney 1-2, M Gammell 0-5, D Murphy 1-1, B Dennehy 0-3, J O'Brien 0-2, D O'Flynn 0-1, C O'Flynn 0-1.		M Walsh 3-3, R O'Sullivan 0-4, JM O'Callaghan 0-2, J Sheehan 0-1, C O'Brien 0-1.

1 June 2013 First round	Dripsey	0-10 - 1-20	Kanturk	Páirc Eoin Mhic Charthaigh
	D O'Riordan 0-6, D O'Sullivan 0-3, B O'Regan 0-1.		L McLoughlin 0-5, J Browne 1-0, A Nash 1-0, J Healy 0-3, A O'Keeffe 0-3, A Walsh 0-3, I Walsh 0-2, L O'Keeffe 0-2, L O'Neill 0-1, M O'Riordan 0-1.

1 June 2013 First round	Barryroe	0-18 - 2-10	Aghabullogue	Brinny Sportsfield
	T Harrington 0-7, M O'Brien 0-3, D O'Sullivan 0-2, K Griffin 0-2, A Fleming 0-2, D Harrington 0-1, C Hurley 0-1.		Dan Twomey 1-1, G Murphy 1-0, Donal Twomey 0-4, F Foley 0-3, J Corkery 0-1, M Dennehy 0-1.

1 June 2013 First round	Éire Óg	2-14 - 4-09	Ballygarvan	Brinny Sportsfield
	D Goudling 1-2, C Sheehan 0-5, J Dineen 0-4, G O'Flynn 1-0, P McDonagh 0-2, D Herlihy 0-1.		M Kennefick 2-5, A Murphy 2-0, S White 0-4.

1 June 2013 First round	Aghada	2-15 - 2-08	Meelin	Kildorrery
	W Leahy 1-10, P O'Neill 1-2, G Melvin 0-1, R Kennedy 0-1, J Connolly 0-1.		DJ O'Sullivan 2-1, E Brosnan 0-3, J Curtin 0-2, C Murphy 0-1, J Forrest 0-1.

2 June 2013 First round	Fr. O'Neill's	2-13 - 1-09	St. Catherine's	Killeagh
	G O'Leary 0-5, R Cullinane 1-1, A Brett 1-1, M O'Keeffe 0-2, P McMahon 0-2, L Swayne 0-1, P Butler 0-1.		P O'Connor 1-1, D Mangan 0-3, S Kearney 0-3, C Aherne 0-2.

2 June 2013 First round	Milford	1-18 - 1-20	Kildorrery	Dr. Mannix Sportsfield
	A Watson 1-5, P O'Regan 0-4, E Dillon 0-2, S Carroll 0-2, P O'Flynn 0-2, H O'Gorman 0-1, J O'Brien 0-1, D Hannigan 0-1.		P O'Brien 0-9, E O'Connor 0-4, R McEniry 1-0, D Kelly 0-3, A O'Brien 0-2, W Fouhy 0-1, J O'Connor 0-1.

2 June 2013 First round	Fermoy	3-16 - 1-06	Dromina	Fr. Con Buckley Park
	D Geary 1-3, J Hutchings 1-2, L Coleman 0-5, M Flynn 1-1, T Clancy 0-2, A O'Connor 0-2, K Morrison 0-1.		J Jordan 1-0, J Hayes 0-2, P Hayes 0-1, K O'Callaghan 0-1, J Delea 0-1, D Buckley 0-1.

=== Second round ===
29 June 2013 Second round	St. Catherine's	0-12 - 1-16	Milford	Ballyhooley
	C Aherne 0-5, S Cotter 0-2, P O'Connor 0-2, S Fitzgerald 0-1, S Kearney 0-1, S O'Brien 0-1.		P O'Regan 1-6, S O'Connell 0-3, A Watson 0-3, H O'Gorman 0-2, J Hartnett 0-1, E Dillon 0-1.

30 June 2013 Second round	Dromina	3-17 - 3-17 (aet)	Argideen Rangers	Cloughduv
	A O'Shaughnessy 0-13, P Hayes 2-0, J Delea 1-0, D Buckley 0-2, K O'Callaghan 0-1, D O'Carroll 0-1.		F Butler 2-1, M Walsh 0-5, B Hennessy 1-0, R O'Sullivan 0-3, M O'Callaghan 0-3, J Sheehan 0-2, E O'Brien 0-2, J Murphy 0-1.

30 June 2013 Second round	Aghabullogue	1-08 - 1-15	Meelin	Mallow GAA Complex
	M O'Flynn 1-4, J Corkery 0-2, D Twomey 0-1, J Buckley 0-1.		E Brosnan 0-9, W Murphy 1-0, W Buckley 0-2, J Curtin 0-2, J O'Callaghan 0-1, B O'Sullivan 0-1.

10 July 2013 Second round	Éire Óg	0-16 - 1-10	Dripsey	Coachford Spprtsfield
	K Hallissey 0-10, C Sheehan 0-2, G O'Flynn 0-1, J Dineen 0-1, C Murphy 0-1, R O'Toole 0-1.		D O'Riordan 0-6, P McDonagh 1-0, D Buckley 0-2, M O'Sullivan 0-1, A Buckley 0-1.

13 July 2013 Second round replay	Dromina	1-09 - 1-15	Argideen Rangers	Cloughduv
	A O'Shaughnessy 0-6, R Morrissey 1-0, P Hayes 0-1, P Hassett 0-1, D O'Carroll 0-1.		M Walsh 1-9, M O'Callaghan 0-3, J Sheehan 0-2, C O'Brien 0-1.

=== Third round ===
6 July 2013 Third round	St. Catherine's	0-21 - 1-10	Aghabullogue	Castletownroche
	S Cotter 0-5, C Aherne 0-4, S O'Farrell 0-3, D Mongan 0-3, E Condon 0-2, W Walsh 0-2, S Kearney 0-1, P O'Connor 0-1.		M O'Flynn 0-5, I Barry-Murphy 1-0, J Buckley 0-3, A Barry-Murphy 0-1, D Twomey 0-1.

20 July 2013 Third round	Dripsey	1-16 - 2-11	Dromina	Mill Field
	D O'Riordan 0-10, M O'Sullivan 1-0, A Buckley 0-3, D O'Sullivan 0-2, G Murphy 0-1.		A O'Shaughnessy 0-6, J Delea 1-1, R Morrissey 1-0, J Jordan 0-3, B Bowles 0-1.

=== Relegation playoff ===
14 September 2013 Playoff	Aghabullogue	1-19 - 0-17	Dromina	Mourne Abbey
	M O'Flynn 0-9, J Corkery 1-3, J Buckley 0-2, D Twomey 0-2, M Dennehy 0-1, S O'Sullivan 0-1, F Foley 0-1.		A O'Shaughnessy 0-7, J Delea 0-4, D Buckley 0-2, K Hayes 0-1, J Finn 0-1, J Jordan 0-1, W Naughton 0-1.

=== Fourth round ===
17 August 2013 Fourth round	Charleville	0-18 - 0-19	Kanturk	Páirc Mhic Ghiobúin
	M Gammell 0-5, M Kavanagh 0-5, J Casey 0-2, J O'Brien 0-2, A Cagney 0-2, A O'Connor 0-1, D Murphy 0-1.		L McLoughlin 0-5, I Walsh 0-4, M O'Riordan 0-2, J Healy 0-2, A Walsh 0-2, W Murphy 0-1, D O'Connor 0-1, L O'Neill 0-1, A Nash 0-1.

4 August 2013 Fourth round	Argideen Rangers	0-14 - 1-12	Meelin	Coachford Spprtsfield
	M Walsh 0-8, R O'Sullivan 0-2, S Coomey 0-1, C O'Brien 0-1, J Sheehan 0-1, N Coomey 0-1.		E Brosnan 1-7, John Forrest 0-2, J Curtin 0-1, W Buckley 0-1, DJ O'Sullivan 0-1.

4 August 2013 Fourth round	Milford	0-17 - 1-12	Ballygarvan	Mourne Abbey
	P O'Regan 0-8, E Dillon 0-4, S O'Connell 0-2, A Watson 0-1, C O'Gorman 0-1, H O'Gorman 0-1.		M Kennefick 1-4, D McCarthy 0-3, E Aherne 0-2, K Ashman 0-1, M O'Riordan 0-1, A Murphy 0-1.

4 August 2013 Fourth round	Barryroe	1-16 - 1-13	Dripsey	Brinny Sportsfield
	J O'Donovan 0-7, M O'Brien 1-1, A Fleming 0-3, K Griffin 0-3, G Coleman 0-1, T Harrington 0-1.		D O'Riordan 0-9, D O'Sullivan 1-2, D Buckley 0-1, A Buckley 0-1.

24 August 2013 Fourth round	Fr. O'Neill's	2-13 - 0-11	Fermoy	St. Catherine's Park
	L Coleman 0-7, D Geary 1-1, P Shanahan 1-0, B O'Sullivan 0-2, T Clancy 0-1, A O'Connor 0-1, J Hutchings 0-1.		L O'Driscoll 0-7, P McMahon 0-2, R Cullinane 0-1, M O'Keeffe 0-1.

31 August 2013 Fourth round	St. Catherine's	1-17 - 1-16	Killdorrery	Rathcormac
	S O'Brien 1-5, S Kearney 0-5, B Mulcahy 0-3, D Mangan 0-2, S Cottter 0-1, S Farrell 0-1.		P O'Brien 0-12, A O'Brien 1-0, D Kelly 0-1, F Stapleton 0-1, S O'Connor 0-1, M Walsh 0-1.

- Aghada and Éire Óg received byes in this round.

=== Quarter-finals ===
1 September 2013 Quarter-final	Milford	0-12 - 1-18	Fermoy	Gaels Memorial Grounds
	P O'Regan 0-6, E Dillon 0-3, H O'Gorman 0-2, A Watson 0-1.		L Coleman 0-10, D Geary 0-4, A O'Connor 1-0, B O'Sullivan 0-1, M Flynn 0-1, J Hutchings 0-1, R O'Callaghan 0-1.

7 September 2013 Quarter-final	Aghada	2-11 - 3-14	Éire Óg	Riverstown Sportsfield
	W Leahy 1-8, E Healy 1-0, R Kennedy 0-1, P O'Neill 0-1, M Russell 0-1.		K Hallissey 0-8, C Sheehan 1-2, J Dineen 1-0, D O'Connor 1-0, D Goulding 0-1, L Murphy 0-1.

13 September 2013 Quarter-final	St. Catherine's	2-13 - 1-14	Barryroe	Páirc Uí Rinn
	S O'Farrell 2-1, Shane O'Brien 0-6, S Kearney 0-2, D Mangan 0-1, M Mulcahy 0-1, B Mulcahy 0-1, S Cotter 0-1.		J O'Donovan 1-7, K Griffin 0-2, T Harrington 0-2, C Hurley 0-1, M O'Brien 0-1, A Fleming 0-1.

6 October 2013 Quarter-final	Meelin	1-10 - 2-11	Kanturk	Fr. Kelleher Park
	S O'Riordan 1-3, E Brosnan 0-5, W Murphy 0-1, B Collins 0-1.		L O'Keeffe 1-2, L McLoughlin 0-5, A Nash 1-0, A Walsh 0-3, J Browne 0-1.

=== Semi-finals ===
5 October 2013 Semi-final	Éire Óg	2-14 - 1-09	St. Catherine's	Páirc Uí Chaoimh
	K Hallissey 0-8, C Sheehan 2-0, P McDonagh 0-1, D O'Connor 0-1, D Goulding 0-1, D Herlihy 0-1, J Dineen 0-1, C Murphy 0-1.		Shane O'Brien 0-6, S O'Farrell 1-0, B Mulcahy 0-2, S Cotter 0-1.

12 October 2013 Semi-final	Fermoy	2-15 - 2-16	Kanturk	Gael Memorial Grounds
	D Geary 1-3, L Coleman 0-5, J Hutchings 1-1, B O'Sullivan 0-3, M Brennan 0-1, T Clancy 0-1, P Shanahan 0-1.		L McLoughlin 1-6, A Walsh 1-3, A Nash 0-2, A O'Keeffe 0-2, M Healy 0-1, J Healy 0-1, C Burke 0-1.

=== Final ===
3 November 2013 Final	Kanturk	2-22 - 1-12	Éire Óg	Páirc Uí Chaoimh
	L McLoughlin 0-11 (three frees, two 65s), A O’Keeffe (one free), A Walsh 1-1 each, L O’Keeffe (one free) 0-2, D Duane, A Nash (free), M Healy, D Kenneally, B Mullane, C Burke, J Brown 0-1 each.	Report	K Hallissey 1-8 (1-5 frees), J Dineen 0-2, D Gouldin, C Murphy 0-1 each.

== Championship statistics ==
=== Top scorers ===
Overall

Rank	Player	Club	Tally	Total	Matches	Average
1	Michael Walsh	Argideen Rangers	4-25	37	4	9.25
1	Kevin Hallissey	Éire Óg	1-34	37	4	9.25
2	Lorcán McLoughlin	Kanturk	1-32	35	5	7.00
3	Andrew O'Shaughnessy	Dromina	0-32	32	4	8.00
4	Diarmuid O'Riordan	Dripsey	0-31	31	4	7.75
5	Éamonn Brosnan	Meelin	1-24	27	4	6.75
5	Patrick O'Regan	Milford	1-24	27	4	6.75
5	Liam Coleman	Fermoy	0-27	27	4	6.75
6	William Leahy	Aghada	2-18	24	2	12.00

In a single game

Rank	Player	Club	Tally	Total	Opposition
1	William Leahy	Aghada	1-10	13	Meelin
1	Andrew O'Shaughnessy	Dromina	0-13	13	Argideen Rangers
2	Michael Walsh	Argideen Rangers	3-03	12	Charleville
2	Michael Walsh	Argideen Rangers	1-09	12	Dromina
2	Peter O'Brien	Kildorrery	0-12	12	St. Catherine's
3	Mark Kennefick	Ballygarvan	2-05	11	Éire Óg
3	William Leahy	Aghada	1-08	11	Éire Óg
3	Kevin Hallissey	Éire Óg	1-08	11	Kanturk
3	Lorcán McLoughlin	Kanturk	0-11	11	Éire Óg
4	Éamonn Brosnan	Meelin	1-07	10	Argideen Rangers
4	John O'Donovan	Barryroe	1-07	10	St. Catherine's
4	Kevin Hallissey	Éire Óg	0-10	10	Dripsey
4	Diarmuid O'Riordan	Dripsey	0-10	10	Dromina
4	Liam Coleman	Fermoy	0-10	10	Milford
