= 1931 Cork Intermediate Hurling Championship =

Irish hurling competition

- Champions: Ballyhea (1st title)
- Runners-up: Bandon

The 1931 Cork Intermediate Hurling Championship was the 22nd staging of the Cork Intermediate Hurling Championship since its establishment by the Cork County Board in 1909.

The final was played on 20 September 1931 at the Athletic Grounds in Cork, between Ballyhea and Bandon, in what was their first ever meeting in the final. Ballyhea won the match by 7–04 to 1–01 to claim their first ever championship title.

== Results ==
=== Final ===
20 September 1931 Final	Ballyhea	7-04 – 1-01	Bandon	Cork Athletic Grounds
