= 2007 Cork Intermediate Hurling Championship =

Irish hurling competition

- Dates: 6 May 2007 – 28 October 2007
- Teams: 16
- Sponsor: Evening Echo
- Champions: Fr. O'Neill's (1st title); Ger O'Leary (captain); Dave Dalton (manager)
- Runners-up: Bandon; Red Crowley (manager)
- Relegated: Glen Rovers

Tournament statistics
- Matches played: 29
- Goals scored: 67 (2.31 per match)
- Points scored: 702 (24.21 per match)
- Top scorer(s): Jer O'Leary (0-41)

The 2007 Cork Intermediate Hurling Championship was the 98th staging of the Cork Intermediate Hurling Championship since its establishment by the Cork County Board, Ireland, in 1909. The draw for the opening round fixtures took place on 10 December 2006. The championship began on 6 May 2007 and ended on 28 October 2007.

On 21 October 2007, Fr. O'Neill's won the championship after a 1–13 to 0–15 defeat of Bandon in the final at Páirc Uí Chaoimh. This was their first ever championship title in this grade. A week later, Glen Rovers ended 31 years of participation in the championship after suffering a one-point defeat by St. Finbarr's in a relegation play-off.

Fr. O'Neills' Jer O'Leary was the championship's top scorer with 0-41.

== Team changes ==
=== To Championship ===
Promoted from the Cork Junior A Hurling Championship

- Kilworth

Relegated from the Cork Premier Intermediate Hurling Championship

- St. Finbarr's

=== From Championship ===
Promoted to the Cork Premier Intermediate Hurling Championship

- Ballymartle

Relegated to the City Junior A Hurling Championship

- Nemo Rangers

== Results ==
=== First round ===
6 May 2007 First round	Kilworth	1-23 - 1-12	Glen Rovers	Rathcormac
	A Mannix 0-7, E Pierce 0-4, P Lynch 0-4, T Twomey 1-1, J Cahill 0-2, B Tobin 0-2, D Cahill 0-1, J Moakley 0-1, D McNamara 0-1.		N Harte 1-2, A Dunlea 0-2, R Rice 0-2, K McCarthy 0-2, L Lynch 0-2, B Hackett 0-1, B O'Donovan 0-1.

6 May 2007 First round	Kilbritatin	1-10 - 2-10	Dromina	Páirc Uí Rinn
	D O'Connell 0-5, A Hayes 1-0, M Sexton 0-2, V O'Brien 0-1, J O'Brien 0-1, J Deasy 0-1.		P Hayes 2-0, A O'Shaughnessy 0-3, P Gould 0-2, G Healy 0-2, L Hayes 0-1, J O'Shaughnessy 0-1, D Ahern 0-1.

6 May 2007 First round	Blackrock	0-10 - 1-15	St. Vincent's	Páirc Uí Rinn
	P O'Sullivan 0-8, M Donoghue 0-1, G Cleary 0-1.		C Barry 0-11, J Daly 1-1, P Aherne 0-2, G O'Connor 0-1.

6 May 2007 First round	Valley Rovers	2-15 - 3-07	St. Finbarr's	Carrigaline
	K Canty 0-6, R Butler 0-6, E Manning 1-2, E Collins 1-0, T Burke 0-1.		D O'Regan 1-6, E Maher 1-0, S Nott 1-0, A Cronin 0-1.

6 May 2007 First round	Milford	1-11 - 1-12	Kanturk	Churchtown
	M O'Connell 1-2, S O'Connell 0-4, E Dillon 0-2, N Geary 0-2, M Savage 0-1.		L McLoughlin 0-9, D Dwane 1-0, B Mullane 0-2, A Walsh 0-1.

6 May 2007 First round	Fr. O'Neill's	0-16 - 2-10	Cobh	Castlemartyr
	J O'Leary 0-6, E Holland 0-4, P Butler 0-3, C Buckley 0-1, K Wall 0-1, A Brett 0-1.		J Meaney 2-4, D Barrett 0-3, B Aherne 0-1, P Meaney 0-1, J Griffin 0-1.

6 May 2007 First round	Carrigaline	1-15 - 1-09	Éire Óg	Brinny Sportsfield
	S Corcoran 0-5, N Murphy 1-0, S O'Brien 0-3, J Moran 0-3, M O'Sullivan 0-2, E O'Keeffe 0-1, W O'Brien 0-1.		D Goulding 1-3, J Crowley 0-4, F Sheehan 0-1, G O'Flynn 0-1.

6 May 2007 First round	Bandon	0-13 - 1-08	Ballygarvan	Brinny Sportsfield
	D Lucey 0-5, D Crowley 0-4, K Hurley 0-1, J Hickey 0-1, J O'Regan 0-1, B Crowley 0-1.		C White 1-3, C Ó Conchúir 0-1, S White 0-1.

13 May 2007 First round replay	Fr. O'Neill's	2-11 - 0-17 (aet)	Cobh	Castlemartyr
	J Flavin 1-5, G O'Leary 0-4, P Butler 1-0, E McCarthy 0-2.		J Meaney 0-5, P Meaney 0-4, E Wilson 0-2, W Drake 0-2, M O'Connor 0-1, B Meaney 0-1, S Kearney 0-1, A Walley 0-1.

18 May 2007 First round 2nd replay	Fr. O'Neill's	1-15 - 1-10	Cobh	Castlemartyr
	J O'Leary 0-8, J Flavin 1-4, J Holland 0-2, E Holland 0-1.		J Meaney 0-5, A Walley 1-0, D Barrett 0-2, P Meaney 0-1, J Griffin 0-1, D O'Rourke 0-1.

=== Second round ===
20 May 2007 Second round	Milford	1-12 - 0-07	Glen Rovers	Croke Memorial Park
	E Dillon 0-8, N Geary 1-1, P O'Regan 0-2, S O'Connell 0-1.		L Lynch 0-5, A Dunlea 0-1, N Harte 0-1.

21 May 2007 Second round	Blackrock	0-04 - 2-15	Kilbrittain	Belgooly
	P O'Sullivan 0-3, K Murphy 0-1.		D O'Connell 1-4, J Deasy 1-1, A Hayes 0-2, D McSweeney 0-2, R Cashman 0-2, V O'Brien 0-1, C O'Leary 0-1, M Sexton 0-1, D Desmond 0-1.

23 May 2007 Second round	Cobh	0-14 - 0-09	St. Finbarr's	Caherlag Sportsfield
	G Meaney 0-7, E Wilson 0-2, D Barrett 0-2, P Meaney 0-1, B Aherne 0-1, J Griffin 0-1.		D O'Regan 0-6, R Dwyer 0-1, S Fuller 0-1, C O'Mahony 0-1.

4 June 2007 Second round	Éire Óg	1-07 - 2-13	Ballygarvan	Brinny Sportsfield
	D Goulding 1-1, G O'Flynn 0-3, T O'Leary 0-2, P McDonagh 0-1.		S White 0-7, D O'Sullivan 1-0, D Douse 1-0, G White 0-3, W McCarthy 0-1, M O'Riordan 0-1, C McCarthy 0-1.

=== Third round ===
9 June 2007 Third round	Dromina	3-14 - 6-12	Kilworth	Fr. Con Buckley Park
	A O'Shaughnessy 1-8, P Hayes 1-1, R Crowley 1-0, K Hayes 0-2, G Hayes 0-1, J O'Shaughnessy 0-1, G Healy 0-1.		P Lynch 3-4, A Mannix 1-5, M O'Brien 1-0, D O'Donoghue 1-0, B Tobin 0-1, T Twomey 0-1, D McNamara 0-1.

10 June 2007 Third round	Milford	1-08 - 3-13	Kilbrittain	Blarney
	N Geary 1-1, E Dillon 0-3, R Geary 0-2, M O'Connell 0-1, M Morrissey 0-1.		A Hayes 2-0, D McSweeney 1-3, D O'Connell 0-4, M Sexton 0-2, J Deasy 0-1, C O'Leary 0-1, R Cashman 0-1, P Sexton 0-1.

16 June 2007 Third round	St. Vincent's	0-08 - 2-15	Fr. O'Neill's	Páirc Uí Chonaill
	C Barry 0-3, P Ahern 0-1, S Ray 0-1, D O'Brien 0-1, G O'Connor 0-1, P Cullinane 0-1.		J O'Leary 0-7, J Flavin 1-2, Q Higgins 1-0, J Holland 0-3, P Butler 0-1, E Holland 0-1, B Murphy 0-1.

10 July 2007 Third round	Cobh	2-09 - 1-13	Carrigaline	Páirc Uí Rinn
	J Meaney 2-4, P Meaney 0-2, E Wilson 0-2, B Ahern 0-1.		S Corcoran 1-3, R Keohane 0-2, P Foster 0-2, S O'Brien 0-1, J Moran 0-1, M O'Sullivan 0-1, E O'Keeffe 0-1, C Hurley 0-1, K O'Driscoll 0-1.

=== Relegation playoffs ===
15 July 2007 Semi-final	Blackrock	3-09 - 1-09	St. Finbarr's	Páirc Uí Rinn
	B Hennebry 1-5, S Norberg 1-1, D Meyler 1-0, D Coughlan 0-1, P O'Sullivan 0-1, B O'Sullivan 0-1.		A Cronin 0-6, R Maher 1-0, P Crowley 0-2, A McCarthy 0-1.

26 August 2007 Semi-final	Éire Óg	1-14 - 1-14	Glen Rovers	Ballincollig
	C Sheehan 0-8, D Goulding 1-1, P McDonagh 0-2, J Malone 0-2, D O'Flynn 0-1.		K Hackett 0-6, B Hackett 1-0, D Goggin 0-3, A Dunlea 0-3, J Goggin 0-1, S Hackett 0-1.

20 October 2007 Semi-final replay	Éire Óg	2-12 - 0-12	Glen Rovers	Ballincollig
	C Sheehan 1-5, D Goulding 1-3, J Crowley 0-2, P McDonagh 0-1, F Sheehan 0-1.		K Hackett 0-6, K Barry 0-2, S Hackett 0-2, S Hegarty 0-1, K McCarthy 0-1.

28 October 2007 Final	St. Finbarr's	2-08 - 0-13	Glen Rovers	Páirc Uí Rinn
	P McCarthy 1-3, J Power 1-2, R O'Dwyer 0-1, D O'Regan 0-1, T Olden 0-1.		K Hackett 0-11, N Harte 0-1, L Galvin 0-1.

=== Quarter-finals ===
15 July 2007 Quarter-final	Bandon	1-12 - 0-13	Valley Rovers	Páirc Naomh Eoin
	D Lucey 0-7, D Burke 1-0, D O'Donoghue 0-2, E O'Donovan 0-1, D Crowley 0-1, G O'Riordan 0-1.		E Collins 0-6, K Canty 0-5, R Butler 0-1, R O'Donovan 0-1.

25 July 2007 Quarter-final	Kilworth	2-11 - 1-10	Kilbrittain	Páirc Uí Rinn
	A Mannix 0-8, T Twomey 1-1, D O'Donoghue 1-0, P Lynch 0-1, D McNamara 0-1.		E Sexton 1-0, R Cashman 0-3, A Hayes 0-3, M Sexton 0-2, D O'Connell 0-2.

23 September 2007 Quarter-final	Kanturk	2-13 - 1-12	Ballygarvan	Coachford Sportsfield
	L McLoughlin 0-8, A Nash 1-1, A Walsh 1-0, D Duane 0-3, B Mullane 0-1.		S White 0-8, S O'Leary 1-0, G Spillane 0-1, C O'Sullivan 0-1, D Bouse 0-1, M Kennefick 0-1.

30 September 2007 Quarter-final	Fr. O'Neill's	1-18 - 0-17	Carrigaline	Caherlag Sportsfield
	J O'Leary 0-8, J Flavin 1-1, Q Higgins 0-3, J Holland 0-2, C Buckley 0-2, E McCarthy 0-1, E Holland 0-1.		S Corcoran 0-7, T Murphy 0-2, P Murphy 0-2, R Keohane 0-2, N Murphy 0-1, E O'Keeffe 0-1, P Foster 0-1, S O'Brien 0-1.

=== Semi-finals ===
7 October 2007 Semi-final	Fr. O'Neill's	0-14 - 1-10	Kilworth	Páirc Uí Chaoimh
	J O'Leary 0-5, J Holland 0-2, E McCarthy 0-2, E Holland 0-2, J Flavin 0-1, K Wall 0-1, Q Higgins 0-1.		A Mannix 0-5, D O'Donoghue 1-0, P Lynch 0-2, T Twomey 0-1, E Pierce 0-1, Aidan Kenny 0-1.

7 October 2007 Semi-final	Bandon	1-15 - 0-16	Kanturk	Coachford Sportsfield
	J Hickey 1-3, D Crowley 0-3, D O'Donoghue 0-2, E O'Donovan 0-2, D Burke 0-2, A Johnson 0-2, J O'Regan 0-1.		A Walsh 0-7, L McLoughlin 0-7, J Healy 0-1, B Mullane 0-1.

=== Final ===
21 October 2007 Final	Fr. O'Neill's	1-13 - 0-15	Bandon	Páirc Uí Chaoimh
	E Holland 1-2, J Flavin 0-3, G O'Leary 0-3, C Buckley 0-2, E McCarthy 0-2, K Wall 0-1.		D Crowley 0-6, D O'Donoghue 0-3, A Johnston 0-3, D Lucey 0-1, D Burke 0-1, R Payne 0-1.

== Championship statistics ==
=== Top scorers ===
Overall

Rank	Player	Club	Tally	Total	Matches	Average
1	Jer O'Leary	Fr. O'Neill's	0-41	41	7	5.85
2	Jer Meaney	Cobh	4-18	30	4	7.50
3	John Flavin	Fr. O'Neill's	4-16	28	7	4.00
3	Adrian Mannix	Kilworth	1-25	28	4	7.00
4	Lorcán McLoughlin	Kanturk	0-24	24	3	8.00
5	Kevin Hackett	Glen Rovers	0-23	23	5	4.60
6	Daniel Goulding	Éire Óg	4-08	20	4	5.00
6	Paudie Lynch	Kilworth	3-11	20	4	5.00
7	Stephen Corcoran	Carrigaline	1-15	18	3	6.00
7	Dan O'Connell	Kilbrittain	1-15	18	4	4.50

In a single game

Rank	Player	Club	Tally	Total	Opposition
1	Paudie Lynch	Kilworth	3-04	13	Dromina
2	Andrew O'Shaughnessy	Dromina	1-08	11	Kilworth
2	Cian Barry	St. Vincent's	0-11	11	Blackrock
2	Kevin Hackett	Glen Rovers	0-11	11	St. Finbarr's
3	Jer Meaney	Cobh	2-04	10	Fr. O'Neill's
3	Jer Meaney	Cobh	2-04	10	Carrigaline
4	Denis O'Regan	St. Finbarr's	1-06	9	Valley Rovers
4	Lorcán McLoughlin	Kanturk	0-09	9	Milford
5	Ciarán Sheehan	Éire Óg	1-05	8	Glen Rovers
5	Barry Hennebry	Blackrock	1-05	8	St. Finbarr's
5	John Flavin	Fr. O'Neill's	1-05	8	Cobh
5	Adrian Mannix	Kilworth	1-05	8	Dromina
5	Paul O'Sullivan	Blackrock	0-08	8	St. Vincent's
5	Jer O'Leary	Fr. O'Neill's	0-08	8	Cobh
5	Eoin Dillon	Milford	0-08	8	Glen Rovers
5	Ciarán Sheehan	Éire Óg	0-08	8	Glen Rovers
5	Adrian Mannix	Kilworth	0-08	8	Kilbrittain
5	Lorcán McLoughlin	Kanturk	0-08	8	Ballygarvan
5	Stephen White	Ballygarvan	0-08	8	Kanturk
5	Jer O'Leary	Fr. O'Neill's	0-08	8	Carrigaline
