= 2008 All-Ireland Minor Football Championship =

Gaelic football competition

Championship details

All-Ireland Champions
- Winning team: Tyrone (7th win)

All-Ireland Finalists
- Losing team: Mayo

Provincial Champions
- Munster: Kerry
- Leinster: Meath
- Ulster: Tyrone
- Connacht: Mayo

The 2008 All-Ireland Minor Football Championship was the 77th staging of the All-Ireland Minor Football Championship, the Gaelic Athletic Association's premier inter-county Gaelic football tournament for boys under the age of 18.

Galway entered the championship as defending champions, however, they were defeated by Roscommon in the Connacht semi-final.

On 27 September 2008, Tyrone won the championship following a 1-20 to 1-15 defeat of Mayo in a replay of the All-Ireland final. This was their seventh All-Ireland title overall and their first title in four championship seasons.

== Results ==
=== Connacht Minor Football Championship ===
Rod-Robin

2008 Rob Robin	Roscommon	1-4 - 0-4	Leitrim	Páirc Seán Mac Diarmada, Carrick-on-Shannon

2008 Rob Robin	Roscommon	0-11 - 1-6	Sligo	Dr. Hyde Park, Roscommon

2008 Rob Robin	Leitrim	1-7 - 3-9	Sligo	Tubbercurry

2008 Rob Robin	Galway	0-11 - 0-9	Sligo	Markievicz Park, Sligo

2008 Rob Robin	Mayo	0-12 - 0-8	Roscommon	McHale Park, Castlebar

Semi-finals

22 June 2008 Semi-Final	Mayo	1-13 - 0-7	Sligo	McHale Park, Castlebar

2008 Semi-Final	Galway	0-14 - 1-12	Roscommon	St. Jarlath's Park, Tuam

Final

13 July 2008 Final	Mayo	0-13 - 0-10	Roscommon	McHale Park, Castlebar

=== Leinster Minor Football Championship ===
Preliminary round

2008 Preliminary round	Wexford	2-19 - 1-4	Kilkenny	Nowlan Park, Kilkenny

2008 Preliminary round	Dublin	0-13 - 0-6	Kildare	Parnell Park, Dublin

2008 Preliminary round	Longford	2-13 - 2-11	Laois

2008 Preliminary round	Meath	1-14 - 1-9	Louth	Páirc Tailteann, Navan

Quarter-finals

2008 Quarter-Final	Wicklow	0-8 - 1-8	Wexford	Aughrim Park, Aughrim

2008 Quarter-Final	Offaly	3-7 - 1-11	Westmeath	O'Connor Park, Tullamore

2008 Quarter-Final	Meath	0-14 - 0-10	Dublin	Parnell Park, Dublin

2008 Quarter-Final	Louth	0-12 - 1-13	Longford	Pearse Park, Longford

Semi-finals

2008 Semi-Final	Meath	3-10 - 2-9	Longford	Páirc Tailteann, Navan

2008 Semi-Final	Offaly	1-12 - 0-9	Carlow	Dr. Cullen Park, Carlow

Final

20 July 2008 Final	Meath	1-14 - 2-10	Offaly	Croke Park, Dublin

=== Munster Minor Football Championship ===
Rob-Robin

June 2008 Rob Robin	Limerick	0-10 - 2-13	Cork	Gaelic Grounds, Limerick

June 2008 Rob Robin	Kerry	1-10 - 0-6	Clare	Cusack Park, Ennis

June 2008 Rob Robin	Waterford	0-8 - 3-9	Tipperary	Fraher Field, Dungarvan

June 2008 Rob Robin	Limerick	1-9 - 1-5	Clare	Cusack Park, Ennis

June 2008 Rob Robin	Limerick	1-13 - 0-11	Waterford	Bruff

Semi-finals

June 2008 Semi-Final	Kerry	0-13 - 0-11	Cork	Páirc Uí Chaoimh, Cork

June 2008 Semi-Final	Tipperary	2-8 - 0-9	Limerick	Semple Stadium, Thurles

Final

6 July 2008 Final	Kerry	1-9 - 1-9	Tipperary	Páirc Uí Chaoimh, Cork

13 July 2008 Final Replay	Kerry	2-12 - 0-8	Tipperary	Cusack Park, Ennis

=== Ulster Minor Football Championship ===
Rob-Robin

2008 Rob Robin	Derry	1-8 - 5-11	Down

2008 Rob Robin	Derry	2-7 - 0-1	Donegal

2008 Rob Robin	Fermanagh	2-8 - 2-7	Antrim

2008 Rob Robin	Cavan	0-15 - 1-5	Tyrone

2008 Rob Robin	Donegal	1-7 - 2-15	Tyrone

2008 Rob Robin	Down	2-11 - 1-19	Armagh

2008 Rob Robin	Tyrone	5-12 - 1-9	Antrim

2008 Rob Robin	Cavan	1-4 - 1-12	Monaghan

2008 Rob Robin	Cavan	1-14 - 2-8	Antrim	Casement Park, Belfast

2008 Rob Robin	Monaghan	2-7 - 2-3	Fermanagh	Brewster Park, Enniskillen

2008 Rob Robin	Donegal	4-10 - 2-12	Derry	MacCumhaill Park, Ballybofey

Quarter-finals

2008 Quarter-Final	Tyrone	0-16 - 0-14	Down	Healy Park, Omagh

2008 Quarter-Final	Armagh	1-4 - 0-14	Cavan	Breffni Park, Cavan

Semi-finals

2008 Semi-Final	Tyrone	1-11 - 1-9	Cavan	St Tiernach's Park, Clones

2008 Semi-Final	Monaghan	1-14 - 1-9	Derry	Healy Park, Omagh

Final

20 July 2008 Final	Tyrone	0-13 - 0-10	Monaghan	St Tiernach's Park, Clones

=== All-Ireland Minor Football Championship ===
Quarter-finals

August 2008 Quarter-Final	Mayo	1-12 - 0-9	Monaghan	Pearse Park, Longford

August 2008 Quarter-Final	Meath	2-9 - 1-10	Tipperary	O'Moore Park, Portlaoise

August 2008 Quarter-Final	Kerry	4-12 - 0-9	Offaly	St Conleth's Park, Newbridge

August 2008 Quarter-Final	Tyrone	1-15 - 1-8	Roscommon	Pearse Park, Longford

Semi-finals

August 2008 Semi-Final	Kerry	0-10 - 1-7	Mayo	Croke Park, Dublin

August 2008 Semi-Final Replay	Kerry	1-9 - 3-13	Mayo	Cusack Park, Ennis

August 2008 Semi-Final	Tyrone	1-21- 2-7	Meath	Croke Park, Dublin

Final

21 September 2008 Final	Tyrone	0-14 - 0-14	Mayo	Croke Park, Dublin

27 September 2008 Final replay	Tyrone	1-20 - 1-15	Mayo	Pearse Park, Longford
