= Ballyhea GAA =

Gaelic games club in County Cork, Ireland

Ballyhea
- Baile Uí Aodha
- Founded: 1884
- County: Cork
- Nickname: The Magpies
- Colours
- Grounds: Gaels Memorial Grounds
- Coordinates: 52°19′35.55″N 8°39′55.61″W

Playing kits
Standard colours

Senior Club Championships
	All Ireland	Munster champions	Cork champions
Hurling:	0	0	1

Ballyhea GAA Club is a Gaelic Athletic Association club in Ballyhea, County Cork, Ireland. The club is affiliated to the North Cork Board and is primarily concerned with the game of hurling, but also fields teams in Gaelic football.

A senior club since 2015, the first team currently competes in the Cork Senior A Hurling Championship, the second tier of the Cork club hurling.

== History ==
Located in the village of Ballyhea, about 4 km from Charleville, Ballyhea GAA Club was established in 1886. It was one of the 21 clubs that affiliated to the Cork County Board at its inaugural meeting in December 1886. The new club made its first appearance in the Cork SHC in 1888.

Arguably, Ballyhea's greatest ever success came in 1896 when the club beat Ballygarvan by 6–10 to 1–02 to win the Cork SHC. They remain the only club from North Cork to have won title title. Ballyhea eventually dropped down the ranks but made a return in 1930 when they won the Cork JHC titles, with further titles being won in 1955 and 1976. These were followed by a return to the top tier with Cork IHC titles in 1931, 1944 and 1980.

After an 88-year absence, Ballyhea returned to the Cork SHC final in 1988, however, St Finbarr's won by 1–15 to 2–04. There was a second Cork SHC final defeat 11 years later in 1995, when Na Piarsaigh beat Ballyhea by 1–12 to 3–01. Ballyhea claimed the Cork PIHC title for the first time when, in 2014, they beat Newcestown in the final.

== Honours ==
- Cork Senior Hurling Championship (1): 1896
- Cork Premier Intermediate Hurling Championship (1): 2014
- Cork Intermediate Hurling Championship (2): 1931, 1944, 1980
- Cork Junior A Hurling Championship (3): 1930, 1955, 1976
- North Cork Junior A Hurling Championship (10): 1930, 1949, 1950, 1953, 1955, 1958, 1959, 1965, 1975, 1976
- Cork Junior B Inter-Divisional Hurling Championship (1): 2022
- North Cork Junior B Hurling Championship (5): 1944, 1948, 2002, 2007, 2011, 2022
- Cork Minor A Hurling Championship (1): 2001
- Cork Minor C Hurling Championship (1): 2011

== Notable players ==
- Neil Ronan: All-Ireland SHC–winner (1999, 2005)
- Jack Russell: All-Ireland U21HC–winner (1966).
