= 1999 Cork Senior Football Championship =

Gaelic football competition

- Dates: 1 May 1999 – 14 November 1999
- Teams: 27
- Sponsor: TSB Bank
- Champions: University College Cork (9th title); Mícheál Ó Cróinín (captain); Des Cullinane (manager)
- Runners-up: Nemo Rangers; Larry Kavanagh (captain); Billy Morgan (manager)

Tournament statistics
- Matches played: 29
- Goals scored: 57 (1.97 per match)
- Points scored: 614 (21.17 per match)
- Top scorer(s): Podsie O'Mahony (1-34)

The 1999 Cork Senior Football Championship was the 111th staging of the Cork Senior Football Championship since its establishment by the Cork County Board in 1887. The draw for the opening fixtures took place on 11 December 1998. The championship began on 1 May 1999 and ended on 14 November 1999.

Bantry Blues entered the championship as the defending champions, however, they were defeated by University College Cork in a second round replay.

On 14 November 1999, University College Cork won the championship following a 1-11 to 1-08 defeat of Nemo Rangers in a replay of the final. This was their 9th championship title overall and their first title since 1973.

Ballincollig's Podsie O'Mahony was the championship's top scorer with 1-34.

== Team changes ==
=== To Championship ===
Promoted from the Cork Intermediate Football Championship

- St Michael's

== Results ==
=== First round ===
1 May 1999 First round	Na Piarsaigh	1-12 - 0-10	Cork Institute of Technology	Páirc Uí Rinn, Cork
	S Glasgow 0-5, G Casey 1-1, M Mullins 0-4, D Gardiner 0-1, K Butterworth 0-1.		M Moore 0-6, E O'Connell 0-2, B Hickey 0-1, A O'Connor 0-1.	Referee: N Barrett (Carrigtwohill)

1 May 1999 First round	Mallow	1-08 - 1-14	Muskerry	Fr. Kelleher Park, Kilbrin
	R Sheehan 0-6, J Walsh 1-0, F McCormack 0-1, M O'Donovan 0-1.		N Twomey 1-2, A Dorgan 0-4, D Kelleher 0-3, A O'Shea 0-2, C Twomey 0-2, J O'Driscoll 0-1.

2 May 1999 First round	St. Finbarr's	0-10 - 2-10	O'Donovan Rossa	Henry Ford Park, Ballinascarthy
	K Kelleher 0-5, B O'Connell 0-2, J O'Donoghue 0-2, I O'Mahony 0-1.		C McCarthy 1-3, D Spring 1-0, D Davis 0-2, B O'Donovan 0-1, S Crowley 0-1, D McCarthy 0-1, J O'Driscoll 0-1, B Casey 0-1.	Referee: R O'Sullivan (Kilmurry)

2 May 1999 First round	Aghada	1-12 - 1-08	St. Nicholas'	Caherlag Sportsfield, Glounthaune
	M Lewis 0-9, D Creedon 1-2, J O'Connell 0-1.		S Coughlan 1-0, M Brosnan 0-2, N Byrnes 0-2, J Lynch 0-2, N McSweeney 0-1, B O'Connell 0-1.	Referee: N Brosnan (Killavullen)

2 May 1999 First round	Seandún	3-05 - 0-16	Clyda Rovers	Blarney Sportsfield, Blarney
	P Triggs 2-0, J Horgan 1-2, P McCarthy 0-1, P O'Connell 0-1, J Crowley 0-1.		R Walsh 0-7, C O'Sullivan 0-4, K Cronin 0-1, T McGlinchey 0-1, F Dorgan 0-1, D O'Brien 0-1, T Mullane 0-1.	Referee: P Higgins (Ballincollig)

2 May 1999 First round	Imokilly	2-15 - 1-08	Avondhu	Páirc Uí Rinn, Cork
	D Barrett 0-8, S Collins 2-1, C McSweeney 0-2, J Ryan 0-1, T McCarthy 0-1, C Reilly 0-1.		D Moher 1-1, E Pierce 0-3, G Kelleher 0-1, J O'Callaghan 0-1, D Ronan 0-1, M Monahan 0-1.	Referee: AJ Cronin (Mayfield)

15 May 1999 First round	Carbery	3-08 - 2-08	Douglas	Páirc Uí Ríogáin, Ballinspittle
	J Cullinane 1-2, F Collins 1-1, D Hayes 1-0, D O'Donoghue 0-2, T Deasy 0-2, J Whooley 0-1.		J Cronin 1-2, R O'Dwyer 1-0, E Coveney 0-3, C O'Donnell 0-2, R McCarthy 0-1.	Referee: G Harrington

15 May 1999 First round	St Michael's	1-07 - 0-16	Bishopstown	Páirc Uí Rinn, Cork
	A Ryan 1-4, D Dempsey 0-1, B O'Keeffe 0-1, F Barry 0-1.		J Honohan 0-3, L Honohan 0-3, M Cogan 0-3, C Lucey 0-3, P Murray 0-2, B Healy 0-1, J Murphy 0-1.	Referee: D Linehan (Nemo Rangers)

16 May 1999 First round	Dohenys	0-06 - 0-16	Clonakilty	Charlie Hurley Park, Bandon
	T Buckley 0-2, F Collins 0-2, F Clifford 0-1, N Collins 0-1.		E O'Mahony 0-7, P Griffin 0-3, K Meade 0-2, M Harrington 0-2, C Murray 0-1, B Walsh 0-1.	Referee: D Linehan

28 May 1999 First round	Ballincollig	2-13 - 2-03	Carrigdhoun	Bishopstown
	P O'Mahony 1-9, F Keohane 1-1, J Miskella 0-1, L O'Toole 0-1, D Bourke 0-1.		N Murphy 1-0, P Buckley 1-0, P Murphy 0-2, P Coughlan 0-1.	Referee: J Kearney (Na Piarsaigh)

30 May 1999 First round	Beara	0-13 - 1-08	Glanmire	Ballineen
	JL O'Sullivan 0-3, S Deane 0-3, C O'Sullivan 0-3, A Harrington 0-2, A O'Regan 0-1, S Spencer 0-1.		T Drinan 1-0, P O'Callaghan 0-3, M Hopkins 0-3, D O'Connell 0-1, P Ryan 0-1.	Referee: M Collins (Clonakilty)

=== Second round ===
29 May 1999 Second round	University College Cork	0-11 - 0-11	Bantry Blues	Castlehaven
	I Twiss 0-3, S Downey 0-2, M Cronin 0-2, C Galvin 0-1, E Hanrahan 0-1, MD Cahill 0-1, G Stack 0-1.		P Clifford 0-4, M Moran 0-2, J Canty 0-2, P O'Rourke 0-1, S McCarthy 0-1, E Sheehan 0-1.	Referee: G Harrington (Carrigaline)

29 May 1999 Second round	Na Piarsaigh	2-10 - 0-11	O'Donovan Rossa	Innishannon
	G Casey 1-1, M Mullins 0-4, D Gardiner 1-0, C O'Sullivan 0-2, T Ó hAilpín 0-1, B Murphy 0-1, R Healy 0-1.		J O'Driscoll 0-4, B O'Donovan 0-3, C Keohane 0-1, D Davis 0-1, D McCarthy 0-1, B Casey 0-1.	Referee: N Barrett

29 May 1999 Second round	Clyda Rovers	2-05 - 1-11	Duhallow	Ballyclough
	G Ambrose 1-0, T McGlinchey 1-0, R Walsh 0-3, C O'Sullivan 0-2.		Don O'Sullivan 1-2, Der O'Sullivan 0-3, M O'Sullivan 0-2, J Herlihy 0-2, D Buckley 0-1, E O'Mahony 0-1.	Referee: R O'Sullivan (Kilmurry)

22 May 1999 Second round	Imokilly	1-08 - 0-15	Aghada	Clonmult Memorial Park, Midleton
	JJ Kearney 1-0, C McSweeney 0-2, J Ryan 0-1, J O'Connell 0-1, M Walsj 0-1, S Collins 0-1, P Cahill 0-1, R Cahill 0-1.		Mark Lewis 0-8, J O'Connell 0-3, Michael Lewis 0-2, C Counihan 0-1, R Dwane 0-1.	Referee: J Geaney

5 June 1999 Second round	Clonakilty	0-13 - 2-10	Castlehaven	Sam Maguire Park, Dunmanway
	B O'Donovan 0-4, B Walsh 0-3, M Harrington 0-2, K Meade 0-2, C Murphy 0-1, E O'Mahony 0-1.		J Cleary 1-4, N Cahalane 0-4, J Maguire 1-0, L Tompkins 0-1, P Hurley 0-1.	Referee: G Harrington

6 June 1999 Second round	Beara	2-10 - 3-10	Nemo Rangers	Rossa Park, Skibbereen
	BG O'Sullivan 1-4, P Harrington 1-0, S Spencer 0-2, A O'Regan 0-1, JL O'Sullivan 0-1, C O'Sullivan 0-1, S O'Regan 0-1.		C Corkery 2-4, A Cronin 1-3, S O'Brien 0-1, J Kavanagh 0-1, JP O'Neill 0-1.	Referee: M Collins (Clonakilty)

12 June 1999 Second round replay	University College Cork	1-11 - 1-08	Bantry Blues	Castlehaven
	M Ó Cróinín 1-3, MD Cahill 0-4, I Twiss 0-2, P Hanley 0-1, B Sheehan 0-1.		St. Dineen 1-4, S McCarthy 0-2, G Canty 0-1, P Clifford 0-1.	Referee: G Harrington (Carrigaline)

7 August 1999 Second round	Muskerry	0-13 - 0-10	Bishopstown	Innishannon
	N Twomey 0-7, D Kelleher 0-3, G McPolin 0-2, A O'Shea 0-1.		M Cogan 0-3, C O'Brien 0-2, L Honohan 0-2, C Lucey 0-1, P Murray 0-1, R Honohan 0-1.	Referee: N Barrett (Carrigtwohill)

7 August 1999 Second round	Carbery	0-16 - 0-17	Ballincollig	Innishannon
	T Deasy 0-5, P Hegarty 0-4, B O'Sullivan 0-3, O Sexton 0-1, D O'Donoghue 0-1, F Collins 0-1, M Kingston 0-1.		P O'Mahony 0-12, F Keohane 0-3, JP O'Leary 0-1, J Miskella 0-1.	Referee: D Linehan (Nemo Rangers)

=== Quarter-finals ===
24 July 1999 Quarter-final	University College Cork	2-09 - 1-08	Aghada	Páirc Séamus de Barra, Carrigtwohill
	M Ó Cróinín 0-5, B Sheehan 1-1, I Twiss 1-0, M Cahill 0-1, P Galvin 0-1, M Ó Sé 0-1.		Mark Lewis 0-4, D Creedon 1-0, A Barry 0-2, P O'Neill 0-1, R Lewis 0-1.	Referee: J Geaney (Kilshannig)

28 August 1999 Quarter-final	Ballincollig	2-11 - 0-13	Castlehaven	Clonakilty
	F Keohane 2-2, P O'Mahony 0-7, J Miskella 0-1, D Bourke 0-1.		C Crowley 0-3, B Deasy 0-3, Bernie Collins 0-2, J Cleary 0-2, A Crowley 0-1, Brian Collins 0-1, F Cahalane 0-1.	Referee: G Harrington (Carrigaline)

29 August 1999 Quarter-final	Duhallow	2-10 - 2-10	Na Piarsaigh	Dr. Mannix Park, Charleville
	M O'Sullivan 1-2, J Buckley 1-1, Der O'Sullivan 0-4, Don O'Sullivan 0-2, J Herlihy 0-1.		M Mullins 1-3, M Prendergast 1-0, G Casey 0-3, C Fitzgerald 0-2, D Gardiner 0-1, R Healy 0-1.	Referee: J Cummins (Glanworth)

29 August 1999 Quarter-final	Nemo Rangers	0-13 - 0-10	Muskerry	Ballincollig
	C Corkey 0-6, J Kavanagh 0-2, S Calnan 0-2, M Cronin 0-1, K Cahill 0-1, D Creedon 0-1.		N Twomey 0-3, D Kelleher 0-2, G McPolin 0-2, C Twomey 0-1, A O'Shea 0-1, J O'Leary 0-1.	Referee: N Barrett (Carrigtwohill)

2 October 1999 Quarter-final replay	Duhallow	3-08 - 2-06	Na Piarsaigh	Dr. Mannix Park, Charleville
	M O'Sullivan 2-1, Der O'Sullivan 0-6, Don O'Sullivan 1-0, J Buckley 0-1.		M Mullins 2-2, D Gardiner 0-2, J Murphy 0-2.	Referee: J Geaney (Kilshannig)

=== Semi-finals ===
4 September 1999 Semi-final	University College Cork	0-16 - 0-11	Ballincollig	Páirc Uí Chaoimh, Cork
	M Ó Cróinín 0-5, I Twiss 0-3, MD Cahill 0-2, B Sheehan 0-2, L Murphy 0-1, G Stack 0-1, M O'Shea 0-1, E Hanrahan 0-1.		P O'Mahony 0-6, F Keohane 0-2, J Miskella 0-2, D Beale 0-1.	Referee: N Barrett

24 October 1999 Semi-final	Nemo Rangers	1-15 - 0-12	Duhallow	Macroom
	C Corkery 1-6, J Kavanagh 0-4, M Cronin 0-2, A Cronin 0-2, G Murphy 0-1.		Der O'Sullivan 0-7, M O'Sullivan 0-2, J Herlihy 0-2, Don O'Sullivan 0-1.	Referee: K Barrett

=== Finals ===
7 November 1999 Final	University College Cork	0-10 - 1-07	Nemo Rangers	Páirc Uí Chaoimh, Cork
	S Downey 1-1, I Twiss 0-2, L Murphy, M Ó Cróinín, M D Cahill and B Sheehan 0-1 each.	Report	C Corkery 0-6 (2f), M Cronin 0-2, M McCarthy and J Kavanagh 0-1 each.	Referee: M Collins (Clonakilty)

14 November 1999 Final replay	University College Cork	1-11 - 1-08	Nemo Rangers	Páirc Uí Chaoimh, Cork
	I Twiss 1-3, M Ó Cróinín 0-5, E Fitzmaurice 0-1, D Reidy 0-1, S Downey 0-1.		C Corkery 0-5, Steven O'Brien 1-0, K Cahill 0-1, J Kavanagh 0-1, JP O'Neill 0-1.	Referee: M Collins (Clonakilty)

== Championship statistics ==
=== Top scorers ===
Top scorers overall

Rank	Player	Club	Tally	Total	Matches	Average
1	Podsie O'Mahony	Ballincollig	1-34	37	4	9.25
2	Colin Corkery	Nemo Rangers	3-21	30	4	7.50
3	Mícheál Ó Cróinín	UCC	1-23	26	6	4.33
4	Mark Mullins	Na Piarsaigh	3-13	22	4	5.50
5	Mark Lewis	Aghada	0-21	21	3	7.00
6	Dermot O'Sullivan	Duhallow	0-20	20	4	5.00
7	Ian Twiss	UCC	2-13	19	6	3.16
8	Fergal Keohane	Ballincollig	3-08	17	4	4.25
9	Mark O'Sullivan	Duhallow	3-07	16	4	4.00
10	Noel Twomey	Muskerry	1-12	15	3	5.00

Top scorers in a single game

Rank	Player	Club	Tally	Total	Opposition
1	Podsie O'Mahony	Ballincollig	1-09	12	Carrigdhoun
1	Podsie O'Mahony	Ballincollig	0-12	12	Carbery
3	Colin Corkery	Nemo Rangers	2-04	10	Beara
4	Colin Corkery	Nemo Rangers	1-06	9	Duhallow
4	Mark Lewis	Aghada	0-09	9	St. Nicholas'
6	Fergal Keohane	Ballincollig	2-02	8	Castlehaven
6	Mark Mullins	Na Piarsaigh	2-02	8	Duhallow
6	Derek Barrett	Imokilly	0-08	8	AVondhu
6	Mark Lewis	Aghada	0-08	8	Imokilly

=== Miscellaneous ===
- University College Cork win their first title since 1973.
