= 1930 Cork Junior Hurling Championship =

Irish hurling competition

- Dates: 12 October – 21 December 1930
- Teams: 6
- Champions: Ballyhea (1st title); M. O'Connell (captain)
- Runners-up: Kinsale; M. O'Connell (captain)

Tournament statistics
- Matches played: 5
- Goals scored: 45 (9 per match)
- Points scored: 20 (4 per match)

The 1930 Cork Junior Hurling Championship was the 34th staging of the Cork Junior Hurling Championship since its establishment by the Cork County Board in 1895. The championship ran from 12 October to 21 December 1930.

The final was played on 21 December 1930 at the Mardyke in Cork, between Ballyhea and Kinsale, in what was their first ever meeting in the final. Ballyhea won the match by 3–01 to 0–02 to claim their first ever championship title.

== Results ==
=== First round ===
12 October 1930 First round	Éire Óg	5-05 - 2-04	Youghal	Monkstown Grounds

26 October 1930 First round	Kinsale	7-02 - 1-01	Kilbrittain	Bandon Grounds

16 November 1930 First round	Ballyhea	11-03 - 5-01	Glen Rovers	Ballyhea Grounds

=== Semi-final ===
7 December 1930 Semi-final	Ballyhea	7-00 - 4-01	Éire Óg	The Mardyke

- Kinsale received a bye in this round.

=== Final ===
21 December 1930 Final	Ballyhea	3-01 - 0-02	Kinsale	Cork Athletic Grounds
