= 2007 All-Ireland Minor Football Championship =

Gaelic football competition

Championship details

All-Ireland Champions
- Winning team: Galway (6th win)

All-Ireland Finalists
- Losing team: Derry

Provincial Champions
- Munster: Cork
- Leinster: Laois
- Ulster: Tyrone
- Connacht: Galway

The 2007 All-Ireland Minor Football Championship was the 76th staging of the All-Ireland Minor Football Championship, the Gaelic Athletic Association's premier inter-county Gaelic football tournament for boys under the age of 18.

Roscommon entered the championship as defending champions, however, they were defeated by Laois in the All-Ireland quarter-final.

On 16 September 2007, Galway won the championship following a 1-10 to 1-9 defeat of Derry in the All-Ireland final. This was their sixth All-Ireland title overall and their first title in 21 championship seasons.

== Results ==
=== Connacht Minor Football Championship ===
Rob Robin

2007 Rob Robin	Leitrim	1-7 - 2-8	Sligo	Cloone

2007 Rob Robin	Galway	0-0 - 0-0	Sligo	Tubbercurry

2007 Rob Robin Replay	Galway	2-12 - 2-6	Sligo	Markievicz Park, Sligo

2007 Rob Robin	Roscommon	1-11 - 0-4	Leitrim	Elphin

2007 Rob Robin	Roscommon	0-14 - 0-8	Sligo	Markievicz Park, Sligo

2007 Rob Robin	Galway	2-10 - 0-10	Leitrim	Dromore West

2007 Rob Robin	Mayo	1-9 - 0-8	Sligo

2007 Rob Robin	Roscommon	2-7 - 0-13	Leitrim	Dr Hyde Park, Roscommon

2007 Rob Robin	Roscommon	1-13 - 0-8	Sligo	Markievicz Park, Sligo

2007 Rob Robin	Leitrim	0-8 - 1-6	Sligo	Ballinamore

Semi-Finals

2007 Semi-Final	Roscommon	1-11 - 1-5	Mayo	McHale Park, Castlebar

2007 Semi-Final	Galway	1-8 - 0-13	Sligo	Páirc Seán Mac Diarmada, Carrick-on-Shannon

Final

8 July 2007 Final	Galway	2-7 - 0-9	Roscommon	Dr. Hyde Park, Roscommon

=== Leinster Minor Football Championship ===
Rob Robin

2007 Rob Robin	Dublin	2-11 - 1-7	Meath	Parnell Park, Dublin

2007 Rob Robin	Longford	2-7 - 2-4	Carlow

2007 Rob Robin	Wicklow	2-14 - 0-8	Offaly

2007 Rob Robin	Westmeath	1-16 - 1-5	Wexford

2007 Rob Robin	Louth	1-12 - 0-13	Kildare

2007 Rob Robin	Laois	4-20 - 0-6	Kilkenny

2007 Rob Robin	Offaly	1-14 - 1-10	Kildare	St Conleth's Park, Newbridge

2007 Rob Robin	Carlow	2-12 - 3-8	Meath	Dr Cullen Park, Carlow

2007 Rob Robin	Carlow	2-9 - 1-7	Wexford	Dr Cullen Park, Carlow

Quarter-Finals

2007 Quarter-Final	Wicklow	1-3 - 1-12	Louth	Pearse Park, Arklow

2007 Quarter-Final	Offaly	2-8 - 0-12	Longford	Pearse Park, Longford

2007 Quarter-Final	Dublin	1-13 - 0-16	Laois	Parnell Park, Dublin

2007 Quarter-Final	Westmeath	0-13 - 2-13	Carlow	Dr Cullen Park, Carlow

Semi-Finals

2007 Semi-Final	Louth	0-9 - 1-10	Carlow	Croke Park, Dublin

2007 Semi-Final	Laois	2-16 - 1-8	Offaly	O'Moore Park, Portlaoise

Final

15 July 2007 Final	Laois	3-8 - 1-12	Carlow	Croke Park, Dublin

=== Munster Minor Football Championship ===
Rob Robin

2007 Rob Robin	Kerry	3-7 - 0-10	Tipperary	Gaelic Grounds, Limerick

2007 Rob Robin	Waterford	0-3 - 0-20	Cork	Páirc Mac Gearailt, Fermoy

2007 Rob Robin	Limerick	2-10 - 1-13	Clare	Cusack Park, Ennis

2007 Rob Robin Replay	Limerick	3-5 - 1-4	Clare	Gaelic Grounds, Limerick

2007 Rob Robin	Tipperary	2-5 - 0-11	Clare	Gaelic Grounds, Limerick

2007 Rob Robin Replay	Tipperary	2-11 - 0-13	Clare	FitzGerald Park, Kilmallock

2007 Rob Robin	Tipperary	1-12 - 0-8	Waterford	Páirc Mac Gearailt, Fermoy

Semi-Finals

2007 Semi-Final	Limerick	0-11 - 2-5	Kerry	Gaelic Grounds, Limerick

2007 Semi-Final	Cork	1-9 - 0-5	Tipperary	FitzGerald Park, Kilmallock

2007 Semi-Final Replay	Limerick	0-8 - 2-13	Kerry	Austin Stack Park, Tralee

Final

1 July 2007 Final	Cork	1-16 - 2-8	Kerry	Fitzgerald Stadium, Killarney

=== Ulster Minor Football Championship ===
Rob Robin

2007 Rob Robin	Derry	3-7 - 0-11	Tyrone	Celtic Park, Derry

2007 Rob Robin	Armagh	1-10 - 1-6	Monaghan	St Tiernach's Park, Clones

2007 Rob Robin	Donegal	0-12 - 1-8	Fermanagh	Kinawley

2007 Rob Robin	Antrim	1-11 - 1-11	Fermanagh

2007 Rob Robin	Down	1-8 - 1-8	Monaghan

2007 Rob Robin	Donegal	1-8 - 2-9	Derry

2007 Rob Robin	Cavan	1-11 - 0-12	Armagh	Carrickcruppen

2007 Rob Robin	Derry	0-13 - 0-8	Antrim	Corrigan Park, Belfast

2007 Rob Robin	Tyrone	1-12 - 2-8	Donegal	Strabane

2007 Rob Robin	Down	3-8 - 1-13	Cavan

2007 Rob Robin	Donegal	0-5 - 0-5	Tyrone

2007 Rob Robin	Cavan	2-13 - 2-12	Monaghan

2007 Rob Robin	Tyrone	2-8 - 0-9	Antrim

2007 Rob Robin	Cavan	2-5 - 1-10	Down	Breffni Park, Cavan

2007 Rob Robin	Fermanagh	1-6 - 2-12	Tyrone	St Tiernach's Park, Clones

2007 Rob Robin	Monaghan	1-6 - 2-1	Down	St. Oliver Plunkett Park, Crossmaglen

Quarter-Finals

2007 Quarter-Final	Armagh	2-9 - 0-11	Donegal	MacCumhaill Park, Ballybofey

2007 Quarter-Final	Antrim	0-3 - 1-10	Derry	Casement Park, Belfast

Semi-Finals

2007 Semi-Final	Tyrone	2-12 - 0-8	Armagh	St Tiernach's Park, Clones

2007 Semi-Final	Monaghan	0-01 - 1-10	Derry	Casement Park, Belfast

Final

15 July 2007 Final	Tyrone	0-10 - 1-06	Derry	St Tiernach's Park, Clones

=== All-Ireland Minor Football Championship ===
Quarter-finals

2007 Quarter-Final	Laois	1-13 - 1-11	Roscommon	Semple Stadium, Thurles

2007 Quarter-Final	Galway	3-13 - 0-7	Carlow	O'Connor Park, Tullamore

2007 Quarter-Final	Kerry	2-9 - 1-8	Tyrone	O'Connor Park, Tullamore

2007 Quarter-Final	Cork	1-7 - 1-8	Derry	Croke Park, Dublin

Semi-finals

2007 Semi-Final	Galway	2-14 - 0-17	Kerry	Croke Park, Dublin

2007 Semi-Final	Laois	2-12 - 1-15	Derry	Croke Park, Dublin

2007 Semi-Final Replay	Laois	1-11 - 4-07	Derry	Páirc Tailteann, Navan

Final

16 September 2007 Final	Galway	1-10 - 1-09	Derry	Croke Park, Dublin
