= Noel Dunne =

Cork hurler (born 1948)

Personal information
- Native name: Nollaig Ó Doinn (Irish)
- Born: 1948 (age 77–78) Cloughduv, County Cork, Ireland
- Occupation: Teacher

Sport
- Sport: Hurling
- Position: Left wing-back
Clubs
- Years: Club
- Cloughduv; Canovee → Muskerry
Club titles
| | Football | Hurling |
| Cork titles | 1 | 0 |
College
- Years: College
- University College Cork
College titles
- Fitzgibbon titles: 0
Inter-county
| Years | County | Apps (scores) |
| 1972–1975 | Cork | 3 (0–00) |
Inter-county titles
- Munster titles: 2
- All-Irelands: 0
- NHL: 2
- All Stars: 0

Noel Dunne (born 1948) is an Irish former hurler and Gaelic footballer. He played with club sides Cloughduv and Canovee, divisional side Muskerry and at inter-county level with Cork.

== Career ==
Dunne first played hurling with the Cloughduv minor team that won three successive divisional titles in the mid-1960s. He soon progressed to adult level and won a Cork JFC title with sister club Canovee in 1968. Dunne was a member of the Cloughduv junior team and added a Cork JHC title to his collection in 1970. He was also a member of the Muskerry divisional teams as a dual player that year and, after losing the SHC final, won a Cork SFC medal after a defeat of Nemo Rangers. Dunne enjoyed further club success when Canovee-Cloughduv completed an intermediate double in 1973.

Dunne first appeared on the inter-county scene with Cork as a member of the minor team that won the Munster MHC title in 1966. He later progressed to the under-21 team and won consecutive All-Ireland U21HC titles in 1968 and 1969. Dunne spent three season with the Cork junior football team and won three consecutive Munster JFC titles. He was part of the Cork senior hurling team that won National League and Munster SHC honours in 1972. Dunne spent a number of seasons associated with the team and won a second National League title in 1974 before claiming a second Munster SHC medal in 1975.

== Honours ==
Canovee

- Cork Intermediate Football Championship: 1973
- Cork Junior Football Championship: 1968
- Mid Cork Junior A Football Championship: 1968

Cloughduv

- Cork Intermediate Hurling Championship: 1973, 1983
- Cork Junior Hurling Championship: 1970
- Mid Cork Junior A Hurling Championship: 1967, 1970

Muskerry

- Cork Senior Football Championship: 1970

Cork

- Munster Senior Hurling Championship: 1972, 1975
- National Hurling League: 1971-72, 1973-74
- Munster Junior Football Championship: 1970, 1971, 1972
- All-Ireland Under-21 Hurling Championship: 1968, 1969
- Munster Under-21 Hurling Championship: 1968, 1969
- Munster Minor Hurling Championship: 1966
