= Connie Kelly =

Irish hurler (1949–1985)

Personal information
- Native name: Conchur Ó Ceallaigh (Irish)
- Born: 1949 Cloughduv, County Cork, Ireland
- Died: 5 April 1985 (aged 36) Farnanes, County Cork, Ireland
- Occupation: Farmer
- Height: 6 ft 0 in (183 cm)

Sport
- Sport: Gaelic football
- Position: Centre-forward
Clubs
- Years: Club
- Cloughduv; Canovee → Muskerry
Club titles
	Football	Hurling
Cork titles	1	0
Inter-county
Years	County	Apps (scores)
1971 1971	Cork (SH); Cork (SF)	1 (0–07); 1 (0-00)
Inter-county titles
- Munster titles: 1
- All-Irelands: 0
- NFL: 0
- All Stars: 0

Cornelius Kelly (1949 – 5 April 1985) was an Irish hurler and Gaelic footballer. He played with club sides Cloughduv and Canovee, divisional side Muskerry and at inter-county level with the Cork senior teams.

== Career ==
Kelly first played hurling with the Cloughduv minor team that won three successive divisional titles in the mid-1960s. He soon progressed to adult level and won a Cork JFC title with sister club Canovee in 1968. Kelly was the championship's top scorer when he added a Cork JHC title to his collection in 1970. He was also a member of the Muskerry divisional teams as a dual player that year and, after losing the SHC final, won a Cork SFC medal after a defeat of Nemo Rangers. Kelly enjoyed further club success when Canovee-Cloughduv completed an intermediate double in 1973. He ended his club career with a second Cork IHC title in 1983.

Kelly first played for Cork as a substitute on the minor team that lost the 1966 All-Ireland minor final to Wexford. He was again eligible for the minor grade the following year and won an All-Ireland MHC medal from left wing-forward when Wexford were beaten. Kelly's performances at club level resulted in a call-up to the under-21 team and he scored 2-07 when Wexford were beaten in the 1970 All-Ireland under-21 final replay. He was drafted onto the Cork senior teams as a dual player for the respective 1971 championships an won a Munster SFC medal after a defeat of Kerry. A recurring back problem resulted in Kelly's inter-county career coming to a premature end.

== Personal life and death ==
Kelly was educated at Pallaskenry Agricultural College in County Limerick and worked on the family farm in Farnanes, County Cork. He died suddenly on 5 April 1985, at the age of 36.

== Honours ==
Canovee

- Cork Intermediate Football Championship: 1973
- Cork Junior Football Championship: 1968
- Mid Cork Junior A Football Championship: 1968

Cloughduv

- Cork Intermediate Hurling Championship: 1973, 1983
- Cork Junior Hurling Championship: 1970
- Mid Cork Junior A Hurling Championship: 1967, 1970

Muskerry

- Cork Senior Football Championship: 1970

Cork

- Munster Senior Football Championship: 1971
- Munster Junior Football Championship: 1971
- All-Ireland Under-21 Hurling Championship: 1970
- Munster Under-21 Hurling Championship: 1970
- All-Ireland Minor Hurling Championship: 1967
- Munster Minor Hurling Championship: 1966, 1967
