= 1981 Cork Intermediate Hurling Championship =

72nd staging of

- Dates: 29 May – 30 August 1981
- Teams: 18
- Champions: Newtownshandrum (3rd title); John Buckley (captain)
- Runners-up: Cloughduv; Peadar McDonnell (captain)

Tournament statistics
- Matches played: 18
- Goals scored: 56 (3.11 per match)
- Points scored: 348 (19.33 per match)
- Top scorer(s): Connie Kelly (2-33)

The 1981 Cork Intermediate Hurling Championship was the 72nd staging of the Cork Intermediate Hurling Championship since its establishment by the Cork County Board in 1909. The draw for the opening round fixtures took place on 25 January 1981. The championship ran from 29 May to 30 August 1981.

The final was played on 30 August 1981 at Bishop Casey Memorial Park in Mallow, between Newtownshandrum and Cloughduv, in what was their first ever meeting in the final. Newtownshandrum won the match by 3-12 to 1-10 to claim their third championship title overall and a first title in five years.

On 30 August 1981, Newtownshandrum won the championship following a 3-12 to 1-10 defeat of Cloughduv in the final at Bishop Casey Memorial Park. This was their third championship title overall and their first title since 1976.

Cloughduv's Connie Kelly was the championship's top scorer with 2-33.

== Team changes ==
=== To Championship ===
Promoted from the Cork Junior Hurling Championship

- Newcestown

=== From Championship ===
Promoted to the Cork Senior Hurling Championship

- Ballyhea

Regrdaed to the East Cork Junior A Hurling Championship

- Watergrasshill

== Results ==
=== First round ===
29 May 1981 First round	Bishopstown	1-05 - 2-10	Glen Rovers	Ballygarvan Grounds

21 June 1981 First round	Passage	0-06 - 1-18	Cloughduv	Ballinhassig Grounds
	A DePuis 0-3, M Gibbons 0-2, G O'Sullivan 0-1.		C Kelly 0-8, J Grainger 1-1, D Walsh 0-3, M Ring 0-2, P McDonnell 0-1, J Barry-Murphy 0-1, T Kelly 0-1, D O'Leary 0-1.

=== Second round ===
31 May 1981 Second round	Mayfield	2-09 - 2-05	Tracton	Manning Park
	B Grady 2-1, M Hannon 0-6, S Lucey 0-1, J Nodwell 0-1.		D Lyons 1-0, A Kiely 1-0, K Ashcroft 0-1, J Kingston 0-1, F Canty 0-1, D Lynch 0-1, P Harrington 0-1.

31 May 1981 Second round	Newtownshandrum	6-10 - 0-01	St. Vincent's	Moore Park
	PJ Greensmith 4-0, P Herlihy 1-4, R McNamara 1-0, J Coughlan 0-2, J Buckley 0-2, D Coughlan 0-1, D Herlihy 0-1.		T Newman 0-1.

31 May 1981 Second round	Erin's Own	0-13 - 0-11	Carrigtwohill	Páirc Lios gCúl
	M Bowen 0-5, R O'Connor 0-3, B Hayes 0-2, PJ Murphy 0-1, B Murphy 0-1, J Bowen 0-1.		D Keane 0-2, MJ Roche 0-2, P O'Connor 0-2, J O'Reilly 0-2, J Horgan 0-1, F Rohan 0-1, B Dineen 0-1.

6 June 1981 Second round	Newcestown	1-12 - 1-04	St. Finbarr's	Cloughduv
	T Crowley 0-7, K Kehilly 1-0, J O'Leary 0-3, D O'Leary 0-1, J O'Neill 0-1.		J O'Shea 1-4.

7 June 1981 Second round	Na Piarsaigh	0-03 - 2-07	Mallow	Fitzgerald Park
	R Smith 0-2, P O'Connor 0-1.		P Buckley 0-5, L O'Callaghan 1-0, R O'Keeffe 1-0, K Sheehan 0-1, P Lawton 0-1.

14 June 1981 Second round	Blackrock	2-13 - 1-10	Ballinhassig	Crosshaven
	F Delaney 0-10, D Norberg 1-0, B Thornhill 1-0, T Ahern 0-2, M Lyons 0-1.		Reynolds 1-6, D McCarthy 0-2, N Cullinane 0-1, P Desmond 0-1.

20 June 1981 Second round	Inniscarra	2-11 - 3-12	Bandon	Cloughduv
	B Ryan 2-4, M O'Donoghue 0-4, H O'Sullivan 0-1, M Manley 0-1, P McDonnell 0-1.		J Murphy 2-1, P Crowley 0-5, N Crowley 1-1, J Gabriel 0-3, A Duggan 0-1, P Hogan 0-1.

27 June 1981 Second round	Cloughduv	0-15 - 2-09	Glen Rovers	Killumney
	C Kelly 0-6, R Lynch 0-3, T Dunne 0-2, T Kelly 0-1, D Walsh 0-1, M Ring 0-1, D O'Leary 0-1.		R Whitley 1-2, K O'Keeffe 0-4, P Deasy 1-0, B Hegarty 0-1, K McCann 0-1, J O'Callaghan 0-1.

4 July 1981 Second round replay	Cloughduv	1-12 - 2-05	Glen Rovers	Killumney
	C Kelly 1-9, T Dunne 0-1, D Walsh 0-1, M Ring 0-1.		K McGann 1-0, P Deasy 1-0, L Mulcahy 0-2, J O'Callaghan 0-1, R Whitley 0-1, Robbie Hegarty 0-1.

=== Quarter-finals ===
21 June 1981 Quarter-final	Erin's Own	4-08 - 0-09	Newcestown	Páirc Uí Chaoimh
	B Hayes 2-0, E Twohig 1-2, G Bowen 1-1, J Bowen 0-3, PJ Murphy 0-1, M Bowen 0-1.		T Crowley 0-7, N Collins 0-1, D O'Leary 0-1.

28 June 1981 Quarter-final	Newtownshandrum	4-13 - 2-14	Bandon	Coachford Sportsfield
	P Herlihy 1-4, J Buckley 1-4, PJ Greensmith 1-1, R McNamara 1-0, D Herlihy 0-2, J Herlihy 0-1, D Coughlan 0-1.		P Crowley 0-10, J Murphy 1-0, R Wilmot 1-0, N Crowley 0-3, G Mahony 0-1.

28 June 1981 Quarter-final	Blackrock	3-10 - 3-07	Mallow	Páirc Mac Gearailt
	M Lyons 1-5, B Thornhill 1-1, A Fahy 1-0, F Delaney 0-3, P Butler 0-1.		P Buckley 1-5, K Sheehan 1-1, J Browne 1-0, L O'Callaghan 0-1.

19 July 1981 Quarter-final	Cloughduv	0-15 - 0-03	Mayfield	Blarney Sportsfield
	D Walsh 0-3, P Lucey 0-3, N Ring 0-2, T Dunne 0-2, C Kelly 0-2, L Leahy 0-2, J Grainger 0-1.		S Long 0-1, S Lucey 0-1, T Searles 0-1.

=== Semi-finals ===
18 July 1982 Semi-final	Newtownshandrum	2-11 - 1-12	Erin's Own	Castletownroche
	P Herlihy 1-3, D Herlihy 1-1, PJ Greensmith 0-3, D Coughlan 0-2, D Morrissey 0-1, R McNamara 0-1.		R O'Connor 1-5, Barry Murphy 0-2, D Coakley 0-1, E Twohig 0-1, G Bowen 0-1, Ber Murphy 0-1, J Bowen 0-1.

16 August 1982 Semi-final	Cloughduv	2-10 - 0-13	Blackrock	Ballygarvan
	C Kelly 1-6, D O'Leary 1-2, M Ring 0-2.		F Delaney 0-11, P Kavanagh 0-2.

=== Final ===
30 August 1981 Final	Newtownshandrum	3-12 - 1-10	Cloughduv	Bishop Casey Memorial Park
	P Herlihy 2-3, R McNamara 1-0, J Buckley 0-2, D Herlihy 0-2, J Herlihy 0-1, P Noonan 0-1, PJ Greensmith 0-1, D Coughlan 0-1, D Naughton 0-1.		M Ring 1-2, D O'Leary 0-2, C Kelly 0-2, C Barry-Murphy 0-1, J Grainger 0-1, D Walsh 0-1, P Lucey 0-1.	Referee: M O'Flaherty (Blackrock)

== Championship statistics ==
=== Top scorers ===
Top scorers overall

Rank	Player	Club	Tally	Total	Matches	Average
1	Connie Kelly	Cloughduv	2-33	39	6	6.50
2	Pat Herlihy	Newtownshandrum	5-14	29	4	7.25
3	Finbarr Delaney	Blackrock	0-24	24	3	8.00
4	P. J. Greensmith	Newtownshandrum	5-05	20	4	5.00
5	Pádraig Crowley	Bandon	0-15	15	2	7.50
6	Tim Crowley	Newcestown	0-14	14	2	7.00
7	Paddy Buckley	Mallow	1-10	13	2	6.50
7	Michael Ring	Cloughduv	1-10	13	6	2.16
9	John Buckley	Newtownshandrum	1-08	11	4	2.75
9	Raymond O'Connor	Erin's Own	1-08	11	3	3.66
