= 2018 Cork Junior A Hurling Championship =

2018 Cork Junior Hurling Championship
- Dates: 15 September – 27 October 2018
- Teams: 14
- Sponsor: Evening Echo
- Champions: Cloughduv (3rd title); Mark Verling (captain); Tim Barry-Murphy (manager)
- Runners-up: Russell Rovers; Daniel Moynihan (captain)

Tournament statistics
- Matches played: 14
- Goals scored: 35 (2.5 per match)
- Points scored: 408 (29.14 per match)
- Top scorer(s): Brian Verling (3-31)

The 2018 Cork Junior Hurling Championship was the 121st staging of the Cork Junior Hurling Championship since its establishment by the Cork County Board in 1895. The championship draw took place in August 2018. The championship began on 15 September 2018 and ended on 27 October 2018.

On 27 October 2018, Cloughduv won the championship after a 2-12 to 0-14 defeat of Russell Rovers in the final. This was their third title overall and their first title since 1970.

== Qualification ==
The Cork Junior Hurling Championship features fourteen teams in the final tournament. Over 70 teams contested the seven divisional championships with the seven respective champions and runners-up automatically qualifying for the county series.

Division	Championship	Champions	Runners-up
Avondhu	North Cork Junior A Hurling Championship	Ballygiblin	Shanballymore
Carbery	West Cork Junior A Hurling Championship	Kilbree	Ballinascarthy
Carrigdhoun	South East Junior A Hurling Championship	Courcey Rovers	Valley Rovers
Duhallow	Duhallow Junior A Hurling Championship	Dromtarriffe	Newmarket
Imokilly	East Cork Junior A Hurling Championship	Russell Rovers	St. Itas's
Muskerry	Mid Cork Junior A Hurling Championship	Cloughduv	Ballinora
Seandún	City Junior A Hurling Championship	Nemo Rangers	Brian Dillons

== Results ==
=== Round 1 ===
15 September 2018 Round 1	Russell Rovers	2-15 - 2-09 (aet)	Courcey Rovers	Éire Óg Grounds

16 September 2018 Round 1	Ballygiblin	0-16 - 2-20	Brian Dillons	Páirc na Bríde
	G Pendle 0-9, C O'Mahony 0-2, D Reidy-Price 0-2, M Walsh 0-1, B O'Sullivan 0-1, M Keane 0-1.		J Horgan 2-11, R Murphy 0-3, C Lynch 0-1, D McCormack 0-1, C McCarthy 0-1, K McCormack 0-1, D Brosnan 0-1, A Murphy 0-1.

22 September 2018 Round 1	Ballinora	0-13 - 1-17	Kilbree	Cloughduv Grounds
	D Howard 0-6, A O'Shea 0-3, K Murphy 0-2, D Holmes 0-1, D Corkery 0-1.		D McCarthy 1-7, J O'Donovan 0-2, S Scannell 0-2, D Coffey 0-2, R Collins 0-1, K Keohane 0-1, D Coakley 0-1, D O'Gorman 0-1.

25 September 2018 Round 1	Shanballymore	2-16 - 1-10	Valley Rovers	Mourneabbey Grounds
	M Burke 0-5, J Sheedy 0-4, B Sheedy 1-0, J Dennehy 1-0, C O'Reilly 0-2, D Palmer 0-2, B O'Reilly 0-2, R McHugh 0-1.		D Looney 0-5, M O'Leary 1-1, P Hurley 0-1, J Crowley 0-1, B Hawkes 0-1, D Lordan 0-1.

26 September 2018 Round 1	Cloughduv	3-17 - 1-16	St Ita's	Páirc Uí Rinn
	J Ryan 2-3, B Verling 1-3, M Walsh 0-4, D Corkery 0-3, E Clifford 0-2, A Murphy 0-1, J Moynihan 0-1.		S Harnedy 1-13, C O'Brien 0-1, M O'Brien 0-1, C Deane 0-1.

28 September 2018 Round 1	Newmarket	1-16 - 1-14	Nemo Rangers	Mallow GAA Complex
	D Hannon 1-12, C Crowley 0-1, B O'Connor 0-1, C Browne 0-1, R O'Keeffe 0-1.		S Horgan 0-8, J Allen 1-1, D Niblock 0-2, K O'Donovan 0-2, A O'Donovan 0-1.

30 September 2018 Round 1	Ballinascarthy	2-13 - 1-14	Dromtarriffe	Éire Óg Grounds
	J Ryan 0-6, B O'Donovan 1-2, S Ryan 1-0, D McCarthy 0-2, B Murray 0-2, C O'Neill 0-1.		S Howard 0-8, E Murphy 1-1, M O'Connor 0-2, T Howard 0-1, J Murphy 0-1, C O'Callaghan 0-1.

=== Quarter-finals ===
6 October 2018 Quarter-final	Newmarket	2-18 - 0-10	Ballinascarthy	Carrigadrohid Grounds
	D Hannon 0-7, C O'Keeffe 1-2, C Browne 1-1, B O'Connor 0-4, R O'Keeffe 0-3, D O'Keeffe 0-1.		J Ryan 0-5, C Cullinane 0-3, B O'Donovan 0-1, C O'Neill 0-1.

6 October 2018 Quarter-final	Shanballymore	0-07 - 3-22	Cloughduv	Mallow GAA Complex
	J Sheedy 0-2, B O'Reilly 0-2, P BUrke 0-1, D Palmer 0-1, E O'Regan 0-1.		B Verling 1-8, K Barry-Murphy 1-1, A Ahern 1-0, M Walsh 0-5, M Verling 0-4, J Ryan 0-3, A Murphy 0-1.

7 October 2018 Quarter-final	Kilbree	1-19 - 2-16	Brian Dillons	Cloughduv Grounds
	D McCaarthy 0-13, D Coffey 0-3, D O'Gorman 1-0, D McSweeney 0-1, Ó Scannell 0-1, S Reale 0-1.		J Horgan 0-8, C Lynch 1-0, D Rodgers 1-0, C McCarthy 0-2, T Lawrence 0-2, M White 0-2, R Murphy 0-2.

13 October 2018 Quarter-final replay	Kilbree	1-15 - 0-16	Brian Dillons	Cloughduv Grounds
	D McCarthy 0-9, D O'Gorman 1-3, S Scannell 0-1, D Coakley 0-1, K Keohane 0-1.		J Horgan 0-9, C Lynch 0-2, M White 0-2, D Rodgers 0-1, K Coughlan 0-1, T Lawrence 0-1.

- Russell Rovers received a bye in this round.

=== Semi-finals ===
13 October 2018 Semi-final	Newmarket	1-09 - 3-16	Cloughduv	Páirc Uí Rinn
	D Hannon 0-4, N Collins 1-0, C O'Keeffe 0-2, K O'Sullivan 0-1, N O'Keeffe 0-1, C Browne 0-1.		B Verling 1-10, M Verling 1-2, K Barry-Murphy 1-0, J Ryan 0-2, M Walsh 0-2.

20 October 2018 Semi-final	Russell Rovers	1-13 - 0-15	Kilbree	Páirc Uí Rinn
	B Hartnett 1-3, J Beausang 0-5, K Moynihan 0-2, J McGrath 0-1, K Walsh 0-1, L Duggan-Murray 0-1.		D Coffey 0-5, D McCarthy 0-5, D Coakley 0-2, J Clancy 0-1, D O'Gorman 0-1, R Collin 0-1.

=== Final ===
27 October 2018 Final	Cloughduv	2-12 - 0-14	Russell Rovers	Páirc Uí Rinn
	B Verling (0-10, 0-7 f, 0-1 65), J Ryan and A Cronin (1-0), B Ahern and J Moynihan (0-1 each).	Report	J Beausang (0-7f), L Duggan Murray and D Moynihan (0-2 each), F Murray, B Hartnett and K Moynihan (0-1 each).	Referee: I McCarthy (Bandon)

== Championship statistics ==
=== Top scorers ===
Rank	Player	County	Tally	Total	Matches	Average
1	Brian Verling	Cloughduv	3-31	40	4	10.00
2	Don McCarthy	Kilbree	1-34	37	4	9.25
3	John Horgan	Brian Dillons	2-28	34	3	11.33
