= 1922 Cork Junior Hurling Championship =

Irish hurling competition

- Champions: Fr Mathew Hall (1st title)
- Runners-up: Cloughduv

The 1922 Cork Junior Hurling Championship was the 25th staging of the Cork Junior Hurling Championship since its establishment by the Cork County Board in 1895. It was the first championship to be held since 1919, due to the impact of the War of Independence.

The final was played between Fr Mathew Hall and Cloughduv, in what was their first ever meeting in the final. Fr Mathew Hall won the match by 3-01 to 2-02 to claim their first ever championship title.

== Results ==
=== Final ===
| Final | Fr Mathew Hall | 3-01 - 2-02 | Cloughduv |
