= 2007 Cork Junior A Football Championship =

- Dates: 30 September – 28 October 2007
- Teams: 8
- Sponsor: Evening Echo
- Champions: Canovee (1st title); James Scanlon (captain); Michael Ring (manager)
- Runners-up: Kildorrery

Tournament statistics
- Matches played: 8
- Goals scored: 16 (2 per match)
- Points scored: 144 (18 per match)
- Top scorer(s): Andrew O'Brien (2–16)

The 2007 Cork Junior A Football Championship was the 109th staging of the Cork Junior A Football Championship since its establishment by Cork County Board in 1895. The competition ran from 30 September to 28 October 2007.

The final was played on 28 October 2007 at Páirc Uí Chaoimh in Cork, between Canovee and Kildorrery, in what was their first ever meeting in the final. Canovee won the match by 1–08 to 0–09 to claim their third championship title overall and a first title in 39 years.

Kildorrery's Andrew O'Brien was the championship's toop scorer with 2–16.

== Results ==
=== Quarter-finals ===
30 September 2007 Quarter-final	Urhan	1-10 - 0-09	Bandon	Wolfe Tone Park
	V Lehane 1-3, C Harrington 0-3, C O'Sullivan 0-3, G Lowney 0-1.		D Aherne 0-6, R Moloney 0-1, J O'Connell 0-1, D Crowley 0-1.

30 September 2007 Quarter-final	Kildorrery	4-14 - 1-10	Tracton	Castlelyons Grounds
	A O'Brien 2-5, T Monaghan 2-2, S Coughlan 0-2, A Walsh 0-1, M Monaghan 0-1, E O'Connor 0-1, D White 0-1, J McCarthy 0-1.		J Kingston 0-4, B Kelleher 0-3, F Lynch 1-0, R Cronin 0-1, J Lyons 0-1.

7 October 2007 Quarter-final	Canovee	2-12 - 0-02	Nemo Rangers	Páirc Uí Chonchúir
	K Walsh 1-2, P Dunlea 0-5, T O'Mahony 1-0, C Dunne 0-2, D O'Sullivan 0-1, B Ahern 0-1, D Cronin 0-1.		E Dilloughrey 0-1, S O'Callaghan 0-1.

7 October 2007 Quarter-final	Ballydesmond	1-14 - 0-05	Bride Rovers	Páirc Uí Shíocháin
	N Fleming 1-5, D O'Connor 0-5, S Kelleher 0-1, L Murphy 0-1, J Healy 0-1, S Murphy 0-1.		J O'Driscoll 0-3, S Ryan 0-1, B Murphy 0-1.

=== Semi-finals ===
7 October 2007 Semi-final	Kildorrery	1-11 - 3-05	Urhan	Uíbh Laoire Grounds
	A O'Brien 0-6, P Hanley 1-0, T Monaghan 0-3, S Coughlan 0-2.		C Harrington 1-2, G Lowney 1-0, J Healy 1-0, C O'Sullivan 0-2, C 'Seer' O'Sullivan 0-1.

13 October 2007 Semi-final replay	Kildorrery	1-10 - 0-11	Urhan	Uíbh Laoire Grounds
	P Hanley 1-1, A O'Brien 0-3, P O'Brien 0-2, S Coughlan 0-2, M Monaghan 0-1, E O'Connor 0-1.		C Harrington 0-6, G Lowney 0-2, J O'Dwyer 0-1, D O'Dwyer 0-1, C O'Sullivan 0-1.

20 October 2007 Semi-final	Canovee	1-10 - 0-06	Ballydesmond	Páirc Uí Rinn
	P Dunlea 1-8, C Dunne 0-1, K Walsh 0-1.		D O'Connor 0-3, N Fleming 0-3.

=== Final ===
28 October 2007 Final	Canovee	1-08 - 0-09	Kildorrery	Páirc Uí Chaoimh
	T O'Mahony 1-0, D O'Sullivan 0-3, K Walsh 0-2, P Dunlea 0-2, E Lyons 0-1.		C Monaghan 0-3, S Coughlan 0-2, A O'Brien 0-2, J Aherne 0-1, P Hanley 0-1.

== Championship statistics ==
=== Top scorers ===
Rank	Player	Club	Tally	Total	Matches	Average
1	Andrew O'Brien	Kildorrery	2-16	22	4	5.50
2	Pat Dunlea	Canovee	1-15	18	4	4.50
3	Conchur Harrington	Urhan	1-11	14	3	4.66
4	Tom Monaghan	Kildorrery	2-05	11	3	3.66
4	Niall Fleming	Ballydesmond	1-08	11	2	5.50
6	Pádraig Hanley	Kildorrery	2-02	8	4	2.00
6	Kevin Walsh	Canovee	1-05	8	3	2.66
6	Donncha O'Connor	Ballydesmond	0-08	8	2	4.00
6	Stephen Coughlan	Kildorrery	2-02	8	4	2.00
