= 2007–08 All-Ireland Junior Club Football Championship =

- Sponsor: Allied Irish Bank
- Champions: Canovee (1st title); James Scanlon (captain); Mickey Ring (manager)
- Runners-up: Rock St Patrick's; Martin McCreesh (captain); Niall Conway (manager)

The 2007–08 All-Ireland Junior Club Football Championship was the seventh staging of the All-Ireland Junior Club Football Championship since its establishment by the Gaelic Athletic Association.

The All-Ireland final was played on 17 February 2008 at Croke Park in Dublin, between Canovee and Rock St Patrick's. Canovee won the match by 1-08 to 0-05 to claim their first ever championship title.

== All-Ireland Junior Club Football Championship ==
=== All-Ireland quarter-final ===
19 January 2008 Quarter-final	Canovee	1-11 - 1-04	John Mitchels	Cloughduv Grounds
	K Walsh 1-2, P Dunlea 0-5, P Healy 0-2, E Lyons 0-1, C Dunne 0-1.		S McCann 1-0, P Melanaphy 0-3, J McDermott 0-1.

=== All-Ireland semi-finals ===
27 January 2008 Semi-final	Canovee	1-06 - 0-05	St Colman's, Gort	Páirc na nGael
	K Walsh 1-1, P Dunlea 0-4, C Dunne 0-1.		E Glynn 0-2, G O'Donnell 0-2, A Coen 0-1.

27 January 2008 Semi-final	Rock St Patrick's	1-11 - 1-08 (aet)	Clann na nGael	Páirc Esler
	C McWilliams (1-1), M McCreesh (0-4, 2 frees), J McCreesh (0-2), E Ward (0-1); A Girvan (0-1), K McGeehan (0-1); J Ward (0-1).	Report	B Murray (1-2), G Woods (0-4, 3 frees); C Smyth (0-1), S MacDonncha (0-1).

=== All-Ireland final ===
17 February 2008 Final	Canovee	1-08 - 0-05	Rock St Patrick's	Croke Park
	K Walsh 1-2, P Dunlea 0-2 (2f), D O'Sullivan, P Healy 0-2 each.	Report	M McCreesh 0-2 (2f), E Ward, J McCreesh, J Mallon 0-1 each.	Referee: P Finnegan (Louth)
