= 1976 Cork Intermediate Hurling Championship =

Irish hurling competition

- Dates: 16 May - 12 September 1976
- Teams: 13
- Champions: Newtownshandrum (2nd title); Phil Noonan (captain)
- Runners-up: Passage; Justin McCarthy (captain)

Tournament statistics
- Matches played: 13
- Goals scored: 57 (4.38 per match)
- Points scored: 258 (19.85 per match)
- Top scorer(s): Bernie Meade (1-20)

The 1976 Cork Intermediate Hurling Championship was the 67th staging of the Cork Intermediate Hurling Championship since its establishment by the Cork County Board in 1909. The draw for the opening round fixtures took place on 25 January 1976. The championship ran from 16 May to 12 September 1976.

On 12 September 1975, Newtownshandrum won the championship following a 2–10 to 1–12 defeat of Passage in the final. This was their second championship title overall and their first title since 1953.

Passage's Bernie Meade was the championship's top scorer with 1-20.

== Team changes ==
=== To Championship ===
Promoted from the Cork Junior Hurling Championship

- Inniscarra

Regraded from the Cork Senior Hurling Championship

- Cloughduv

=== From Championship ===
Promoted to the Cork Senior Hurling Championship

- Ballinhassig

== Results ==
=== First round ===
16 May 1976 First round	Midleton	w/o - scr	Cloughduv

16 May 1976 First round	Inniscarra	0-12 - 2-06	St. Finbarr's	Blarney Grounds
	T Ryan 0-7, P O'Connell 0-3, B Ryan 0-1, M McDonnell 0-1.		D Brosnan 1-1, B Wiley 1-0, S Looney 0-3, P Curley 0-1, C Ryan 0-1.

23 May 1976 First round	Cobh	2-17 - 0-13	Ballincollig	Riverstown Sportsfield
	J Kinavane 2-2, M McGee 0-7, K O'Connor 0-3, T Meaney 0-2, T McGee 0-1, J Hallahane 0-1, N Rooney 0-1.		F Daly 0-7, B Fitton 0-3, J Lucey 0-2, P O'Connell 0-1.

23 May 1976 First round	St. Vincent's	1-05 - 1-13	Newtownshandrum	Fr. Con Buckley Park
	P O'Regan 1-2, A Russell 0-2, D Linehan 0-1.		D Coughlan 0-5, L Bowles 1-0, D Herlihy 0-3, PJ Greensmith 0-2, J Buckley 0-2, M Leahy 0-1.

5 June 1976 First round	Blackrock	4-14 - 3-06	Carrigtwohill	Riverstown Sportsfield
	P Doyle 2-1, P Butler 1-4, E O'Sullivan 1-2, F Delaney 0-2, T Lyons 0-1, F O'Neill 0-1, M Murphy 0-1, K Lyons 0-1, N Kirby 0-1.		P Keane 1-1, P O'Connor 1-0, D O'Connor 1-0, D O'Donovan 0-2, J O'Reilly 0-1, J Burke 0-1, M Rohan 0-1.

19 June 1976 First round replay	Inniscarra	2-07 - 3-04	St. Finbarr's	Blarney Grounds
	T Ryan 0-4, P McDonnell 1-0, J O'Leary 1-0, M McDonnell 0-2, P O'Connell 0-1.		M Archer 1-1, J Cremin 1-1, B Collins 1-0, C Ryan 0-1, C Cullinane 0-1.

18 July 1976 First round second replay	Inniscarra	2-10 - 1-08	St. Finbarr's	Blarney Grounds
	T Ryan 0-8, O Lane 1-0, H O'Brien 1-0, P O'Connell 0-1, M McDonnell 0-1.		M Archer 1-1, J Cremin 0-4, J O'Callaghan 0-2, P Hurley 0-1.

=== Quarter-finals ===
20 June 1976 Quarter-final	Cobh	3-04 - 1-13	Midleton	Carrigtwohill Grounds
	K O'Connor 1-2, T McGee 1-0, J Kinavane 1-0, M McGee 0-1, T Meaney 0-1.		J Fenton 0-7, J Hurley 1-0, S Kearney 0-2, S O'Farrell 0-1, J Cleary 0-1, M O'Brien 0-1, P O'Sullivan 0-1.

26 June 1976 Quarter-final	Passage	3-17 - 2-10	Watergrasshill	Church Road
	D Meade 0-11, D Keane 2-0, W Murphy 0-4, T Howard 1-0, G O'Sullivan 0-1, J O'Reilly 0-1.		G O'Herlihy 2-2, D Murphy 0-4, T O'Riordan 0-2, J Higgins 0-1, S O'Riordan 0-1.

4 July 1976 Quarter-final	Blackrock	6-09 - 3-06	Newcestown	Coachford Sportsfield
	M Murphy 3-1, F O'Neill 2-0, P Doyle 1-0, E O'Sullivan 0-3, K Lyons 0-2, T Lyons 0-1, F Delaney 0-1, G Buckley 0-1.		T Crowley 2-3, M Kehilly 1-1, K Callanan 0-1, J O'Leary 0-1.

8 August 1976 Quarter-final	Inniscarra	1-09 - 2-10	Newtownshandrum	Banteer Sportsfield
	P O'Connell 0-5, J O'Leary 1-0, T O'Leary 0-2, M McDonnell 0-1.		D Coughlan 2-2, D Herlihy 0-4, J Buckley 0-3, M Leahy 0-1.

=== Semi-finals ===
14 August 1976 Semi-final	Passage	4-14 - 4-06	Blackrock	Ballinlough Grounds
	B Meade 1-6, D Murphy 1-3, K Keane 1-1, D Keane 1-0, D O'Connell 0-3, H O'Connell 0-1.		P Doyle 2-3, M Murphy 1-0, P Butler 1-0, E O'Sullivan 0-2, F Delaney 0-1.

29 August 1976 Semi-final	Newtownshandrum	4-11 - 0-12	Midleton	Castletownroche Grounds
	D Herlihy 0-5, C Morrissey 1-1, PJ Greensmith 1-1, J Buckley 1-1, D Coughlan 1-0, M Leahy 0-1, M Thompson 0-1, L Bowles 0-1.		J Fenton 0-6, J O'Brien 0-2, S Kearney 0-2, G Glavin 0-1, S O'Farrell 0-1.

=== Final ===
12 September 1976 Final	Newtownshandrum	2-10 - 1-12	Passage	Castletownroche Sportsfield
	J Buckley 0-5, C Morrissey 1-1, L Bowles 1-0, D Herlihy 0-2, PJ Greensmith 0-1, P Herlihy 0-1.		W Murphy 0-4, D Keane 1-0, B Meade 0-3, M O'Connell 0-2, D O'Connell 0-1, G O'Sullivan 0-1, T Howard 0-1.

== Championship statistics ==
=== Top scorers ===
Overall

Rank	Player	Club	Tally	Total	Matches	Average
1	Bernie Meade	Passage	1-20	23	3	7.66
2	Pat Doyle	Blackrock	5-04	19	3	6.33
2	Tomás Ryan	Inniscarra	0-19	19	4	4.75
4	Donal Coughlan	Newtownshandrum	3-07	16	3	5.33
5	Mossie Murphy	Blackrock	4-02	14	3	4.66
5	John Buckley	Newtownshandrum	1-11	14	4	3.50
5	Donal Herlihy	Newtownshandrum	0-14	14	4	3.50
8	John Fenton	Midleton	0-13	13	2	6.50
9	Dave Keane	Passage	4-00	12	3	4.00
10	John Kinavane	Cobh	3-02	11	2	5.50

In a single game

Rank	Player	Club	Tally	Total	Opposition
1	Bernie Meade	Passage	0-11	11	Watergrasshill
2	Mossie Murphy	Blackrock	3-01	10	Newcestown
3	Tim Crowley	Newcestown	2-03	9	Blackrock
3	Pat Doyle	Blackrock	2-03	9	Passage
3	Bernie Meade	Passage	1-06	9	Blackrock
6	John Kinavane	Cobh	2-02	8	Ballincollig
6	Ger O'Herlihy	Watergrasshill	2-02	8	Passage
6	Donal Coughlan	Newtownshandrum	2-02	8	Inniscarra
6	Tomás Ryan	Inniscarra	0-08	8	St. Finbarr's
10	Pat Doyle	Blackrock	2-01	7	Carrigtwohill
10	Pat Butler	Blackrock	1-04	7	Carrigtwohill
10	Tomás Ryan	Inniscarra	0-07	7	St. Finbarr's
10	Mick McGee	Cobh	0-07	7	Ballincollig
10	Frank Daly	Ballincollig	0-07	7	Cobh
10	John Fenton	Midleton	0-07	7	Cobh
