= 1986 Cork Intermediate Hurling Championship =

Irish hurling competition

- Dates: 10 May – 17 August 1986
- Teams: 23
- Champions: Cloughduv (5th title); John Grainger (captain)
- Runners-up: Erin's Own

Tournament statistics
- Matches played: 25
- Goals scored: 72 (2.88 per match)
- Points scored: 494 (19.76 per match)
- Top scorer(s): Don O'Leary (2-27)

The 1986 Cork Intermediate Hurling Championship was the 77th staging of the Cork Intermediate Hurling Championship since its establishment by the Cork County Board in 1909. The draw for the opening round fixtures took place on 26 January 1986. The championship ran from 10 May to 17 August 1986.

On 17 August 1986, Cloughduv won the championship following a 2–12 to 0–11 defeat of Erin's Own in the final at Páirc Uí Chaoimh. This as their fifth championship title overall and their first title since 1983.

Cloughduv's Don O'Leary was the championship's top scorer with 2-27.

== Results ==
=== First round ===
11 May 1986 First round	Castletownroche	1-15 - 0-07	St. Vincent's	Castlelyons
	Dan Relihan 0-7, Dave Relihan 0-4, M Hazelwood 1-0, F Brosnan 0-2, W Walsh 0-1, E Walsh 0-1.		B Coutts 0-3, W Walsh 0-1, L Harte 0-1, J Corbett 0-1, R Feeney 0-1.

11 May 1986 First round	St. Finbarr's	3-04 - 1-13	St. Catherine's	Castlelyons
	M Barry 2-1, J Murphy 1-0, S Murphy 0-2, M Kennedy 0-1.		C Clancy 1-5, D Walsh 0-3, M Mellerick 0-3, P Clancy 0-1, C Casey 0-1.

11 May 1986 First round	Cloughduv	1-11 - 0-05	Passage	Páirc Liam Mhic Cárthaigh
	C Barry-Murphy 1-0, T Barry-Murphy 0-3, P McDonnell 0-2, D O'Leary 0-2, T O'Riordan 0-1, B McSweeney 0-1, J Grainger 0-1, J Barry-Murphy 0-1.		P O'Sullivan 0-4, B Meade 0-1.

11 May 1986 First round	Ballinhassig	1-14 - 1-07	Blackrock	Páirc Liam Mhic Cárthaigh
	S McCarthy 0-7, P Desmond 1-0, P Fleming 0-3, D McCarthy 0-2, K Cullinane 0-1, P Cussen 0-1.		P O'Neill 1-1, P Fitzgerald 0-2, P Moylan 0-1, T Aherne 0-1, T Lyons 0-1, R Hegarty 0-1.

11 May 1986 First round	Nemo Rangers	1-09 - 2-06	Midleton	Carrigtwohill
	D Lynch 1-1, F Golden 0-4, K Murphy 0-2, S Coughlan 0-1, D Allen 0-1.		J Fenton 1-4, P O'Farrell 1-0, K Coakley 0-1, L Williams 0-1.

11 May 1986 First round	Newtownshandrum	1-08 - 1-11	Tracton	Coachford Sportsfield
	J Coughlan 0-5, J Ryan 1-0, G Morrissey 0-1, D Coughlan 0-1, J Geary 0-1.		P Murphy 1-0, DJ Kiely 0-3, K Kingston 0-3, M Quinn 0-2, L Kelly 0-2, J Kingston 0-1.

11 May 1986 First round	Mayfield	1-10 - 1-13	Éire Óg	Páirc Uí Chaoimh
	A Murphy 0-7, S Hurley 1-0, D Crowley 0-2, S O'Donovan 0-1.		D Desmond 0-7, J O'Leary 0-5, M O'Flynn 1-0, M Kelleher 0-1.

8 June 1986 First round replay	Nemo Rangers	3-05 - 0-06	Midleton	Páirc Uí Chaoimh
	D Lehane 1-1, F Golden 1-1, S Hayes 1-0, S Coughlan 0-2, J O'Mahony 0-1.		L Williams 0-2, J Hennessy 0-1, E Cleary 0-1, N O'Neill 0-1, V O'Neill 0-1.

=== Second round ===
10 May 1986 Second round	Inniscarra	2-05 - 2-09	Douglas	Delany Rovers Park
	J Murphy 1-0, M McDonnell 1-0, M O'Donoghue 0-3, P Maher 0-1, C Maher 0-1.		J Murphy 1-2, A Sheedy 1-1, P Daly 0-3, P Walsh 0-2, M O'Regan 0-1.

11 May 1986 Second round	Kilbrittain	1-08 - 0-16	Erin's Own	Páirc Uí Chaoimh
	P Brennan 0-4, C O'Connell 1-0, D Healy 0-2, M Holland 0-2.		R O'Connor 0-4, J Corcoran 0-4, G Bowen 0-3, PJ Murphy 0-2, M Bowen 0-1, T O'Keeffe 0-1, J Bowen 0-1.

11 May 1986 Second round	Cobh	2-09 - 3-04	Bishopstown	Carrigtwohill
	G Morgan 1-8, P Butler 1-0, T Devlin 0-1.		C Coffey 1-4, A O'Sullivan 1-0, T Keating 1-0.

17 May 1986 Second round	Bandon	3-09 - 4-06	Mallow	Church Road
	P Crowley 1-3, M Kelly 1-0, P Desmond 1-0, J O'Donovan 0-2, J Keohane 0-2, P O'Donovan 0-1, P Cullhane 0-1.		T Coakley 1-3, J Nugent 1-0, J Buckley 1-0, E Carey 1-0, R Sheehan 0-2, P Buckley 0-1.

30 May 1986 Second round	Tracton	2-07 - 0-05	Éire Óg	Ballinhassig
	K Kingston 1-3, D Lynch 1-0, DJ Kiely 0-2, L Kelly 0-1, L Cronin 0-1.		D Desmond 0-5.

31 May 1986 Second round	Castletownroche	5-08 - 1-20	St. Catherine's	Bride Rovers Park
	Dan Relihan 3-1, Dave Relihan 1-7, M Magnier 1-0.		C Clancy 0-12, J Mangan 1-0, M Mellerick 0-3, W Kearney 0-3, P Clancy 0-1, D Walsh 0-1.

1 June 1986 Second round	Cloughduv	1-16 - 0-08	Ballinhassig	Ovens
	D O'Leary 0-8, T O'Riordan 0-4, C Barry-Murphy 1-0, J Grainger 0-2, T Barry-Murphy 0-1, B McSweeney 0-1.		S McCarthy 0-5, P Desmond 0-2, B Coleman 0-1.

7 June 1986 Second round replay	Bandon	2-10 - 2-09	Mallow	Church Road
	P Crowley 1-2, JJ Keohane 1-0, G O'Mahony 0-3, P O'Donovan 0-1, J O'Donovan 0-1, P Desmond 0-1, G O'Sullivan 0-1, R Wilmot 0-1.		T Coakley 0-6, R Sheehan 1-1, J Nugent 1-0, J Buckley 0-1, D Murphy 0-1.

15 June 1986 Second round	Nemo Rangers	1-09 - 2-07	Newcestown	Ballinhassig
	F Golden 1-7, D Allen 0-1, S Coughlan 0-1.		T Crowley 0-5, E Kenneally 1-0, M O'Mahony 1-0, J Kenneally 0-1, G Smith 0-1.

20 June 1986 Second round replay	Castletownroche	3-04 - 1-15	St. Catherine's	Bride Rovers Park
	Dan Relihan 2-0, Dave Relihan 1-2, F Fallon 0-1, W Walsh 0-1.		C Clancy 1-4, P Clancy 0-3, C Casey 0-2, W Kearney 0-2, P O'Donoghue 0-1, M Mellerick 0-1, D Walsh 0-1, D O'Neill 0-1.

=== Quarter-finals ===
15 June 1986 Quarter-final	Douglas	2-14 - 2-12	Bandon	Ballinhassig
	P Walsh 1-5, E Forde 1-2, J Murphy 0-3, M O'Regan 0-2, T Hurley 0-1, P Lynch 0-1.		P Crowley 0-9, R Wilmot 1-0, P Desmond 1-0, J O'Donovan 0-2, J Keohane 0-1.

29 June 1986 Quarter-final	Tracton	2-14 - 0-08	Newcetsown	Innishannon Sportsfield
	K Kingston 1-2, DJ Kiely 0-5, J Kingston 1-1, M Quinn 0-3, D Lynch 0-1, P O'Reilly 0-1, P Harrington 0-1.		T Crowley 0-3, E Kenneally 0-2, P Kenneally 0-2, O O'Sullivan 0-1.

29 June 1986 Quarter-final	Erin's Own	2-10 - 0-12	Cobh	Carrigtwohill
	PJ Murphy 2-2, J Corcoran 0-4, K Horgan 0-1, G Bowen 0-1, J Bowen 0-1, R O'Connor 0-1.		G Morgan 0-6, O Coughlan 0-2, B Kearney 0-1, M Meaney 0-1, T Butler 0-1, B Frahill 0-1.

26 July 1986 Quarter-final	Cloughduv	1-16 - 1-12	St. Catherine's	Church Road
	T Barry-Murphy 0-6, T O'Riordan 1-1, B McSweeney 0-4, D O'Leary 0-3, C Barry-Murphy 0-1, P McDonnell 0-1.		JG Barry 1-0, C Clancy 0-3, P Clancy 0-2, D Walsh 0-2, D O'Neill 0-1, K Lane 0-1, C Casey 0-1, M Mellerick 0-1, J Managan 0-1.

=== Semi-finals ===
12 July 1986 Semi-final	Erin's Own	3-12 - 0-11	Douglas	Riverstown Sportsfield
	J Bowen 1-4, B Murphy 1-1, J Dillon 1-0, F Horgan 0-2, R O'Connor 0-2, J Corcoran 0-2, PJ Murphy 0-1.		P Walsh 0-4, P Daly 0-2, P Lynch 0-2, M O'Regan 0-1, A Sheehy 0-1, E Forde 0-1.

3 August 1986 Semi-final	Cloughduv	1-14 - 1-08	Tracton	Innishannon Sportsfield
	D O'Leary 1-7, T Barry-Murphy 0-2, B McSweeney 0-1, T O'Riordan 0-1, L Lynch 0-1, J Grainger 0-1, T Dunne 0-1.		K Kingston 0-4, D Lynch 1-0, DJ Kiely 0-2, L Kelly 0-1, J Kingston 0-1.

=== Final ===
17 August 1986 Final	Cloughduv	2-12 - 0-11	Erin's Own	Páirc Uí Chaoimh
	D O'Leary 1-7, C Barry-Murphy 1-0, B McSweeney 0-2, L Lynch 0-1, T Barry-Murphy 0-1, J Grainger 0-1.		J Corcoran 0-3, R O'Connor 0-2, G Bowen 0-2, F Horgan 0-2, M Bowen 0-1, PJ Murphy 0-1.

== Championship statistics ==
=== Top scorers ===
Overall

Rank	Player	Club	Tally	Total	Matches	Average
1	Don O'Leary	Cloughduv	2-27	33	5	6.60
2	Christy Clancy	St. Catherine's	2-24	30	4	7.50
3	Dan Relihan	Castletownroche	5-08	23	3	7.66
4	Pádraig Crowley	Bandon	2-14	20	3	6.66
5	Dave Relihan	Castletownroche	3-13	22	3	7.33
6	Fergus Golden	Nemo Rangers	2-12	18	3	6.00
6	Kieran Kingston	Tracton	2-12	18	4	4.50
8	Ger Morgan	Cobh	1-14	17	2	8.50
9	Pat Walsh	Douglas	1-11	14	3	4.66
10	John Corcoran	Erin's Own	0-13	13	4	3.25
10	Tim Barry-Murphy	Cloughduv	0-13	13	5	2.60

In a single game

Rank	Player	Club	Tally	Total	Opposition
1	Christy Clancy	St. Catherine's	0-12	12	Castletownroche
2	Ger Morgan	Cobh	1-08	11	Bishopstown
3	Dan Relihan	Castletownroche	3-01	10	St. Catherine's
3	Dave Relihan	Castletownroche	1-07	10	St. Catherine's
3	Fergus Golden	Nemo Rangers	1-07	10	Newcestown
3	Don O'Leary	Cloughduv	1-07	10	Tracton
3	Don O'Leary	Cloughduv	1-07	10	Erin's Own
8	Pádraig Crowley	Bandon	0-09	9	Douglas
9	P. J. Murphy	Erin's Own	2-02	8	Cobh
9	Christy Clancy	St. Catherine's	1-05	8	St. Finbarr's
9	Pat Walsh	Douglas	1-05	8	Bandon
9	Don O'Leary	Cloughduv	0-08	8	Ballinhassig
