= 1973 Cork Intermediate Football Championship =

Gaelic football competition

- Dates: 15 April – 5 August 1973
- Teams: 14
- Champions: Canovee (1st title)
- Runners-up: Glanworth

Tournament statistics
- Matches played: 13
- Goals scored: 32 (2.46 per match)
- Points scored: 219 (16.85 per match)
- Top scorer(s): Noel Dunne (0–22)

The 1973 Cork Intermediate Football Championship was the 38th staging of the Cork Intermediate Football Championship since its establishment by the Cork County Board in 1909. The draw for the first round fixtures took place on 28 January 1973. The championship ran from 15 April to 5 August 1973.

The final was played on 5 August 1973 at the Athletic Grounds in Cork, between Canovee and Glanworth, in what was their first ever meeting in the final. Canovee won the match by 2–11 to 0–06 to claim their first ever championship title.

== Results ==
=== First round ===
15 April 1973 First round	Bishopstown	1-09 - 3-03	Newmarket	O'Connell Park
	D Murphy 1-1, C O'Sullivan 0-3, J Lynch 0-2, E McCarthy 0-2, J Nellis 0-1.		J O'Flynn 2-0, J Collins 1-0, E O'Sullivan 0-2, T Burke 0-1.

15 April 1973 First round	Youghal	1-11 - 2-05	St Michael's	Páirc Shéamuis de Barra
	J Power 1-0, P Barry 0-3, N Gallagher 0-3, M McCarthy 0-2, N Hogan 0-2, T Mullins 0-1.		G Delaney 1-2, P Doyle 1-1, P Casey 0-2.

15 April 1973 First round	Kilmurry	1-06 - 2-11	Glanworth	Cork Athletic Grounds
	F Long 1-1, S Murphy 0-3, R O'Sullivan 0-1, N Ronan 0-1.		DJ Ryan 1-4, T Linehan 1-3, E O'Neill 0-2, A Fahy 0-2.

22 April 1973 First round	Canovee	1-18 - 0-04	Glanmire	Páirc Uí Chonchúir
	N Dunne 0-6, M Aherne 1-1, C Kelly 0-2, T O'Mahony 0-3, D Mehigan 0-3, P White 0-3.		B Óg Murphy 0-4.

6 May 1973 First round replay	Bishopstown	2-09 - 0-09	Newmarket	O'Connell Park
	T Healy 1-3, J Lynch 1-0, C O'Sullivan 0-3, G Nellis 0-1, T Lucey 0-1, D Murphy 0-1.		B Daly 0-4, T Burke 0-2, B Eardley 0-1, J O'Flynn 0-1, J Collins 0-1.

13 May 1973 First round	Nemo Rangers	1-05 - 0-05	Midleton	Páirc Shéamuis de Barra
	J Collins 1-0, J Cooke 0-2, M O'Driscoll 0-1.		T Canavan 0-3, W Glavin 0-1, J Hurley 0-1.

13 May 1973 First round	St Vincent's	2-09 - 2-07	St Finbarr's	Church Road
	P Regan 1-4, J Regan 1-0, B Heffernan 0-3, P McNamara 0-1, J Healy 0-1.		C Buckley 1-2, T Moore 1-0, O McCarthy 0-3, C McCarthy 0-2.

=== Quarter-finals ===
13 May 1973 Quarter-final	Bantry Blues	4-08 - 1-10	Cobh	Charlie Hurley Park
	D Barron 2-3, M O'Connell 1-2, D Hunt 1-0, B Williams 0-3.		S O'Connor 0-8, M Cronin 1-1, M Sloane 0-1.

18 May 1973 Quarter-final	Bishopstown	w/o - scr.	Nemo Rangers	Cork Athletic Grounds

17 June 1973 Quarter-final	Canovee	0-15 - 0-03	Youghal	Páirc Shéamuis de Barra
	N Dunne 0-4, L Nash 0-4, M Aherne 0-4, P Whyte 0-1, D Mehigan 0-1, J Dunlea 0-1.		L Cooper 0-2, N Gallagher 0-1.

24 June 1973 Quarter-final	Glanworth	1-16 - 1-11	St Vincent's	Castlelyons Grounds

=== Semi-finals ===
8 July 1973 Semi-final	Glanworth	3-10 - 1-08	Bantry Blues	Cork Athletic Grounds
	P McCarthy 2-0, G Quinlan 1-1, J Courtney 0-5, DJ Ryan 0-2, J Cummins 0-1, T Linehan 0-1.		J O'Riordan 1-0, D Barron 0-6, M Connolly 0-1, B Williams 0-1.

8 July 1973 Semi-final	Bishopstown	0-08 - 1-07	Canovee	Páirc Uí Chonchúir
	C O'Sullivan 0-6, T Healy 0-1, G McCarthy 0-1.		N Dunne 0-6, C Kelly 1-0, L Nash 0-1.

=== Final ===
5 August 1973 Final	Canovee	2-11 - 0-06	Glanworth	Cork Athletic Grounds
	N Dunne 0-6, C Kelly 1-0, D O'Brien 1-0, L Nash 0-2, T O'Mahony 0-2, T O'Leary 0-1.		T Coakley 0-3, T Linehan 0-1, G Quinlan 0-1, P McCarthy 0-1.

== Championship statistics ==
=== Miscellaneous ===
- Nine players on the Canovee team completed the double after they also lined out with Cloughduv who won the 1973 Cork IHC.
