= 1970 Cork Senior Football Championship =

Gaelic football competition

- Dates: 12 April 1970 – 18 October 1970
- Teams: 18
- Champions: Muskerry (1st title); Séamus McCarthy (captain)
- Runners-up: Nemo Rangers; Frank Cogan (captain)

Tournament statistics
- Matches played: 19
- Goals scored: 49 (2.58 per match)
- Points scored: 345 (18.16 per match)
- Top scorer(s): Noel Dunne (1-25)

The 1970 Cork Senior Football Championship was the 82nd staging of the Cork Senior Football Championship since its establishment by the Cork County Board in 1887. The draw for the opening round fixtures took place on 25 January 1970. The championship began on 12 April 1970 and ended on 18 October 1970.

University College Cork entered the championship as the defending champions, however, they were beaten by St. Nicholas' in a first round replay.

The final was played on 18 October 1970 at the Athletic Grounds in Cork between Muskerry and Nemo Rangers in what was their first ever meeting in the final. Muskerry won the match by 3-10 to 4-06 to claim their first ever championship title. It remains their only championship title.

Muskerry's Noel Dunne was the championship's top scorer with 1-25.

== Team changes ==
=== To Championship ===
Promoted from the Cork Intermediate Football Championship

- St Michael's

== Results ==
=== First round ===
1 May 1970 First round	Millstreet	0-08 - 3-09	Beara	Sam Maguire Park
	D Long 0-5, TJ Dennehy 0-2, M Hickey 0-1.		B Hanley 0-7, C O'Sullivan 2-0, J Downey 1-0, K O'Sullivan 0-1, B O'Neill 0-1.	Referee: R Lyons (Dohenys)

10 May 1970 First round	St. Nicholas'	2-09 - 2-09	University College Cork	Cork Athletic Grounds
	T O'Brien 1-3, D O'Driscoll 1-1, D Coughlan 0-2, P Hurley 0-2, D Moore 0-1.		B Lynch 1-4, D Coffey 1-2, D Kavanagh 0-2, M Morris 0-1.	Referee: J Dennigan (Fermoy)

17 May 1970 First round replay	St. Nicholas'	3-12 - 0-07	University College Cork	Cork Athletic Grounds
	P Harte 2-2, D Coughlan 1-2, T O'Brien 0-4, D Morley 0-2, J O'Sullivan 0-1, P Hurley 0-1.		B Lynch 0-2, D Kavanagh 0-2, D Coffey 0-1, B O'Keeffe 0-1, N O'Sullivan 0-1.	Referee: J Dennigan (Fermoy)

=== Second round ===
12 April 1970 Second round	Clonakilty	1-11 - 2-11	Avondhu	Cork Athletic Grounds
	TF Hayes 0-7, M McCarthy 1-0, Teddy Hayes 0-2, E McCarthy 0-1, N Lane 0-1.		DJ Ryan 1-2, T Monaghan 1-1, J Horgan 0-4, D Bermingham 0-2, M Burke 0-1, M Cronin 0-1.	Referee: F Halbert (Glenville)

19 April 1970 Second round	Macroom	2-06 - 0-03	Duhallow	Millstreet Grounds
	D Mullane 1-2, T O'Sullivan 0-4, H Casey 1-0.		H O'Sullivan 0-1, J O'Sullivan 0-1, B Daly 0-1.

26 April 1970 Second round	St Michael's	2-08 - 0-09	Carbery	Clonakilty Grounds
	R Cummins 1-1, N O'Keeffe 0-4, M Lynch 0-1, F Norberg 0-1, P Moylan 0-1.		T Murphy 0-7, J Carroll 0-1, D Barron 0-1.

8 May 1970 Second round	Na Piarsaigh	0-06 - 2-11	St. Finbarr's	The Mardyke
	D O'Leary 0-3, L Joyce 0-1, T Nagle 0-1, R Touhy 0-1.		C Roche 0-6, B Murphy 1-2, E Fitzpatrick 1-0, Gene McCarthy 0-2, C McCarthy 0-1.	Referee: M McCarthy (St. Nicholas')

10 May 1970 Second round	Cobh	1-08 - 6-18	Nemo Rangers	Riverstown Sportsfield
	J Murphy 1-1, S Connors 0-3, C Donovan 0-2, F McGann 0-1, M Cronin 0-1.		D Allen 2-6, J Barrett 2-4, S McGann 0-5, N Morgan 1-0, R Cogan 1-0, M O'Donoghue 0-2, C Murphy 0-1.	Referee: F Halbert (Glenville)

10 May 1970 Second round	Muskerry	1-12 - 1-10	Seandún	Cloughduv Grounds
	N Dunne 0-7, J Lynch 1-1, M Mehigan 0-3, J Lynch 0-1.		S Casey 0-5, S Willis 1-1, P O'Sullivan 0-2, P O'Neill 0-1, T O'Leary 0-1.	Referee: F Halbert (Glenville)

17 May 1970 Second round	Imokilly	1-15 - 2-05	Carrigdhoun	Cork Athletic Grounds
	E Ryan 0-10, JJ Crowley 1-1, R Swaine 0-2, M McCarthy 0-1, P Fitzgerald 0-1.		B Greenway 1-1, J Murphy 1-0, J Hurley 0-3, B Murphy 0-1.	Referee: P Cronin (St. Finbarr's)

21 June 1970 Second round	Beara	2-09 - 1-05	St. Nicholas'	Rossa Park
	B O'Neill 1-3, B Hanley 0-4, Cormac O'Sullivan 1-0, C O'Sullivan 0-2.		T O'Brien 1-3, P Harte 0-2.

=== Quarter-finals ===
7 June 1970 Quarter-final	Muskerry	3-14 - 2-08	Avondhu	Cork Athletic Grounds
	F Cooper 2-1, M Mehigan 1-3, N Dunne 0-5, B O'Connor 0-2, S McCarthy 0-1, C Twomey 0-1, D Murphy 0-1.		B Honohan 1-0, T Monaghan 1-0, N Kirby 0-3, J Horgan 0-2, M O'Connell 0-1, E Fleming 0-1, D O'Sullivan 0-1.	Referee: F Halbert (Glenville)

Quarter-final	Macroom	0-06 - 1-11	St Michael's	Coachford Sportsfield
	J O'Brien 0-4, D Browne 0-2.		R Cummins 1-2, N O'Keeffe 0-5, M Lynch 0-1, M O'Loughlin 0-1, P Ryan 0-1, P Moylan 0-1.	Referee: F Halbert (Glenville)

31 July 1970 Quarter-final	Nemo Rangers	1-06 - 0-08	St. Finbarr's	The Mardyke
	D Allen 1-2, M O'Donoghue 0-2, S McGann 0-2.		P McMahon 0-3, J Hegarty 0-1, C McCarthy 0-1, Gene McCarthy 0-1, C Roche 0-1, N Aherne 0-1.

2 August 1970 Quarter-final	Beara	0-10 - 0-06	Imokilly	Sam Maguire Park
	B O'Neill 0-8, C O'Sullivan 0-1, M O'Regan 0-1.		E Ryan 0-2, J Crowley 0-2, N Gallagher 0-2.

=== Semi-finals ===
20 August 1970 Semi-final	Nemo Rangers	1-16 - 2-07	St Michael's	The Mardyke
	N Morgan 1-2, D Allen 0-6, J Barrett 0-4, B Cogan 0-2, M O'Donoghue 0-2.		N O'Keeffe 0-6, R Cummins 1-0, M Lynch 1-0, P Kavanagh 0-1.

23 August 1970 Semi-final	Muskerry	0-08 - 0-08	Beara	Clonakilty Grounds
	N Dunne 0-5, M Mehigan 0-1, F Cooper 0-1, C Kelly 0-1.		KJ O'Sullivan 0-5, B O'Neill 0-2, J Downing 0-1.

20 September 1970 Semi-final replay	Muskerry	1-13 - 1-08	Beara	Clonakilty Grounds
	M Mehigan 1-3, F Cooper 0-4, N Dunne 0-3, S McCarthy 0-2, C Twomey 0-1.		M O'Regan 1-2, B Hanley 0-5, Cormac O'Sullivan 0-1.	Referee: P O'Donovan (Bantry Blues)

=== Final ===
18 October 1970 Final	Muskerry	3-10 - 4-06	Nemo Rangers	Cork Athletic Grounds
	N Dunne 1-5, D Murphy 1-1, J Dunlea 1-0, C Kelly 0-1, G Lynch 0-1, S McCarthy 0-1, M Scannell 0-1.		J Barrett 1-3, S McGann 1-0, N Morgan 1-0, D Allen 1-0, D Cogan 0-3.	Referee: F Halbert (Glenville)

== Championship statistics ==
=== Top scorers ===
Top scorers overall

Rank	Player	Club	Tally	Total	Matches	Average
1	Noel Dunne	Muskerry	1-25	28	5	5.60
2	Dinny Allen	Nemo Rangers	4-14	26	4	6.50
3	Jimmy Barrett	Nemo Rangers	3-11	20	4	5.00
4	Bernie O'Neill	Beara	1-14	17	5	3.40
5	Teddy O'Brien	St. Nicholas'	2-10	16	3	5.33
5	Michael Mehigan	Muskerry	2-10	16	5	3.20
5	Barry Hanley	Beara	0-16	16	4	4.00
8	Neally O'Keeffe	St Michael's	0-15	15	3	5.00
9	Ray Cummins	St Michael's	3-03	12	3	4.00
9	Frank Cooper	Muskerry	2-06	12	5	2.20
9	Éamonn Ryan	Imokilly	0-12	12	2	6.00

Top scorers in a single game

Rank	Player	Club	Tally	Total	Opposition
1	Dinny Allen	Nemo Rangers	2-06	12	Cobh
2	Jimmy Barrett	Nemo Rangers	2-04	10	Cobh
2	Éamonn Ryan	Imokilly	0-10	10	Carrigdhoun
4	Patsy Harte	St. Nicholas'	2-02	8	UCC
4	Noel Dunne	Muskerry	1-05	8	Nemo Rangers
4	Bernie O'Neill	Beara	0-08	8	Imokilly
7	Frank Cooper	Muskerry	2-01	7	Avondhu
7	Brendan Lynch	UCC	1-04	7	St. Nicholas'
7	Barry Hanley	Beara	0-07	7	Millstreet
7	Tim F. Hayes	Clonakilty	0-07	7	Avondhu
7	Tony Murphy	Carbery	0-07	7	St Michael's
7	Noel Dunne	Muskerry	0-07	7	Seandún

=== Miscellaneous ===
- Muskerry win their and to date only title.
- Muskerry miss out on the double after losing out in the hurling final.
- Nemo Rangers qualify for the final for the first time.
