= John Buckley (Newtownshandrum hurler) =

Irish hurler

Personal information
- Native name: Seán Ó Buachalla (Irish)
- Born: 1953 (age 72–73) Newtownshandrum, County Cork, Ireland

Sport
- Sport: Hurling
- Position: Centre-back
Club
- Years: Club
- Newtownshandrum
Club titles
- Cork titles: 0
Inter-county
Years	County	Apps (scores)
1973-1974	Cork	2 (0-00)
Inter-county titles
- Munster titles: 0
- All-Irelands: 0
- NHL: 1
- All Stars: 0

John Buckley (born 1953) is an Irish former hurler. He played with club side Newtownshandrum, divisional side Avondhu and at inter-county level with the Cork senior hurling team.

== Career ==
Buckley first played hurling at juvenile and underage levels with Newtownshandrum. After winning the inaugural Cork U21HC title with the club in 1973, he progressed to adult level. Buckley was part of the Newton intermediate teams that won the Cork IHC titles in 1976 and as team captain in 1981. His performances at club level also saw him line out for the Avondhu divisional team.

Buckley first played for Cork during a three-year stint with the minor team. He won his first All-Ireland MHC medal after coming on as a substitute in the 1969 final before winning a second from centre-back the following year. Buckley captained the team to a third successive title in 1971 and became the first played since Jimmy Doyle to claim three successive winners' medals. He was immediately drafted onto the under-21 team and won an All-Ireland U21HC medal in 1973. Buckley later spent two years with the senior team and won a National League medal in 1974.

== Honours ==
Newtownshandrum

- Cork Intermediate Hurling Championship: 1976, 1981 (c)
- Cork Under-21 Hurling Championship: 1973

Cork

- National Hurling League: 1973-74
- All-Ireland Under-21 Hurling Championship: 1973
- Munster Under-21 Hurling Championship: 1973
- All-Ireland Minor Hurling Championship: 1969, 1970, 1971 (c)
- Munster Minor Hurling Championship: 1969, 1970, 1971

Sporting positions
Preceded by Séamus Coughlan	Cork minor hurling team captain 1971	Succeeded by
Achievements
Preceded by Pat Kavanagh	All-Ireland MHC final winning captain 1971	Succeeded by Brian Cody
