= 1941 Cork Intermediate Hurling Championship =

Sporting Event in 1941

- Champions: Cloughduv (2nd title)
- Runners-up: Buttevant

The 1941 Cork Intermediate Hurling Championship was the 32nd staging of the Cork Intermediate Hurling Championship since its establishment by the Cork County Board in 1909.

Buttevant entered the championship as the deeding champions.

The final was played on 2 November 1941 at the Mardyke in Cork, between Cloughduv and Buttevant, in what was their first ever meeting in the final. Cloughduv won the match by 6–04 to 3–00 to claim their second championship title overall and a first championship title in 30 years.

== Results ==
=== Final ===
| 2 November 1941 Final | Cloughduv | 6-04 – 3-00 | Buttevant | The Mardyke |
