= 1940 Cork Junior Hurling Championship =

Irish hurling competition

- Champions: Cloughduv (1st title)
- Runners-up: Newtownshandrum

The 1940 Cork Junior Hurling Championship was the 43rd staging of the Cork Junior Hurling Championship since its establishment by the Cork County Board.

On 21 October 1940, Cloughduv won the championship following a 10–00 to 5–01 defeat of Newtownshandrum in the final at Fermoy Sportsfield. It was their first ever championship title.
