= Dan O'Sullivan (Gaelic footballer) =

Irish Gaelic footballer

Personal information
- Native name: Dónall Ó Súilleabháin (Irish)
- Born: 1927 Carrigadrohid, County Cork, Ireland
- Died: 2013 (aged 86) Carrigadrohid, County Cork, Ireland

Sport
- Sport: Gaelic football
- Position: Full-forward
Club
- Years: Club
- Canovee
Club titles
- Cork titles: 0
Inter-county*
Years	County	Apps (scores)
1950-1953	Cork	5 (0-3)
Inter-county titles
- Munster titles: 0
- All-Irelands: 0
- NFL: 0
- *Inter County team apps and scores correct as of 18:00, 2 December 2013.

Daniel Joseph O'Sullivan (1927–2013) was an Irish Gaelic footballer who played as a full-forward for the Cork senior team.

Born in Carrigadrohid, County Cork, O'Sullivan first arrived on the inter-county scene at the age of twenty-four when he first linked up with the Cork junior team. He made his senior debut in the 1950 championship. He was a Munster runner-up on two occasions.

At club level, O'Sullivan won one championship medal in the junior grade with Canovee.

Throughout his career O'Sullivan made five championship appearances for Cork. He retired from senior inter-county football following the conclusion of the 1953 championship.

== Honours ==
Canovee

- Cork Junior Football Championship (1): 1950

Cork

- All-Ireland Junior Football Championship (1): 1955
- Munster Junior Football Championship (2): 1953, 1955
