= 1973 Cork Intermediate Hurling Championship =

Irish hurling competition

- Dates: 22 April - 22 July 1973
- Teams: 14
- Champions: Cloughduv (3rd title); Noel Dunne (captain)
- Runners-up: Blackrock

Tournament statistics
- Matches played: 13
- Goals scored: 66 (5.08 per match)
- Points scored: 197 (15.15 per match)
- Top scorer(s): Connie Kelly (1-21)

The 1973 Cork Intermediate Hurling Championship was the 64th staging of the Cork Intermediate Hurling Championship since its establishment by the Cork County Board in 1909. The draw for the opening round fixtures took place at the Cork Convention on 28 January 1973.

On 22 July 1973, Cloughduv won the championship following a 2-09 to 2-05 defeat of Blackrock in the final at Páirc Uí Chonaill. This was their third championship title overall and their first title since 1941.

Cloughduv's Connie Kelly was the championship's top scorer with 1-21.

== Team changes ==
=== From Championship ===
Promoted to the Cork Senior Hurling Championship

- Mallow

Regraded to the Cork Junior Hurling Championship

- Cloyne

=== To Championship ===
Promoted from the Cork Junior Hurling Championship

- Newcestown

== Results ==
=== First round ===
22 April 1973 First round	Cobh	4-02 - 1-06	Brian Dillons	Carrigtwohill Grounds
	T McGee 2-0, T Meaney 1-2, D Lynch 1-0.		B O'Connell 1-2, E Lucey 0-3, J Goode 0-1.

13 May 1973 First round	Newcestown	5-09 - 2-04	Newtownshandrum	Cork Athletic Grounds
	T Crowley 1-4, M Kehilly 1-2, A O'Halloran 1-1, J O'Callaghan 1-0, S Crowley 1-0, J O'Leary 0-1, A O'Flynn 0-1.		P Morrissey 1-2, J Herlihy 1-0, C Morrissey 1-0, J Buckley 0-2.

13 May 1973 First round	Ballincollig	3-05 - 2-08	Blackrock	Ballinhassig
	P Murphy 1-3, B Fitton 1-2, T Dwyer 1-0.		A Creagh 1-0, B Cummins 1-0, D Collins 0-3, W Cronin 0-2, F Norberg 0-1, G Buckley 0-1, A Fahy 0-1.

27 May 1973 First round	Glen Rovers	2-03 - 1-10	Bandon	Innishannon Grounds
	P Murphy 1-2, K Hourihan 1-0, F Cunningham 0-1.		N Crowley 0-7, P O'Riordan 1-1, J Gabriel 0-2.

27 May 1973 First round	Youghal	2-02 - 4-14	Midleton	Páirc Liam Uí Riain
	H Fox 2-1, M McCarthy 0-1.		W Glavin 1-7, N Lee 2-0, J Fenton 0-3, M McCarthy 0-2, T O'Mahony 0-2.

3 June 1973 First round replay	Ballincollig	2-04 - 3-13	Blackrock	Ballinhassig
	B Fitton 1-0, T Radley 1-0, J Lucey 0-2, P Murphy 0-2.		P Kavanagh 0-9, M Hyland 1-1, B Cummins 1-0, J Russell 1-0, G O'Leary 0-3.

=== Quarter-finals ===
20 May 1973 Quarter-final	Cloughduv	6-10 - 2-00	Castletownroche	Cork Athletic Grounds
	D Healy 3-1, M Walsh 2-2, C Kelly 1-5, T Kelly 0-2.		K McSweeney 1-0, D O'Neill 1-0.

27 May 1973 Quarter-final	Newcestown	3-05 - 2-04	Carrigtwohill	Cloughduv Grounds
	M Kehilly 2-0, A O'Flynn 1-0, T Crowley 0-3, A O'Halloran 0-1, J O'Callaghan 0-1.		M J Roche 1-0, P O'Connor 1-0, M Sheehan 0-3, J O'Callaghan 0-1.

10 June 1973 Quarter-final	Bandon	1-14 - 4-10	Cobh	Cork Athletic Grounds
	N Crowley 0-7, P O'Riordan 1-2, J Gabriel 0-2, J Gabriel 0-1, F Crowley 0-1, R Wilmot 0-1.		D Lynch 2-2, K O'Connor 1-5, D O'Connor 1-0, S McCarthy 0-2, M Meaney 0-1.

10 June 1973 Quarter-final	Midleton	3-09 - 3-10	Blackrock	Riverstown Sportsfield
				Referee: M Coleman (Ballinhassig)

=== Semi-finals ===
21 June 1973 Semi-final	Blackrock	3-10 - 1-10	Cobh	Riverstown Sportsfield
	M Hyland 1-4, A Creagh 1-2, J Regan 1-0, A Fahy 0-1, S Kearney 0-1, J Russell 0-1.		T Fenton 1-2, K O'Connor 0-4, T Meaney 0-2, J Hallahan 0-1, D Lynch 0-1.

24 June 1973 Semi-final	Cloughduv	3-13 - 0-08	Newcestown	Charlie Hurley Park
	C Kelly 0-9, J Kelly 1-2, D Healy 1-1, N Dunne 0-1.		T Crowley 0-4, A O'Halloran 0-2, K Kehilly 0-1, G O'Leary 0-1.

=== Final ===
22 July 1973 Final	Cloughduv	2-09 - 2-05	Blackrock	Páirc Uí Chonaill
	C Kelly 0-7, M Walsh 2-0, J Kelly 0-2.		B Cummins 2-0, P Kavanagh 0-3, W Cronin 0-2.
