= 1911 Cork Intermediate Hurling Championship =

Irish hurling competition

- Champions: Cloughduv (1st title); T. O'Sullivan (captain)
- Runners-up: Blackrock; B. Foley (captain)

The 1911 Cork Intermediate Hurling Championship was the third staging of the Cork Intermediate Hurling Championship since its establishment by the Cork County Board.

On 22 October 1911, Cloughduv won the championship following a 6–02 to 3–01 defeat of Blackrock in the final at the Coachford Enclosure.

== Results ==
=== Final ===
22 October 1911 Final	Cloughduv	6-02 - 3-01	Blackrock	Coachford Enclosure
