= 1950 Cork Junior Football Championship =

Irish hurling competition

- Champions: Canovee (1st title)
- Runners-up: Newmarket

The 1950 Cork Junior Football Championship was the 52nd staging of the Cork Junior Football Championship since its establishment by the Cork County Board in 1895.

The final, a replay, was played on 26 November 1950 at the Athletic Grounds in Cork, between Canovee and Newmarket, in what was their first ever meeting in the final. Canovee won the match by 3–06 to 1–04 to claim their first ever championship title.

== Results ==
=== Final ===
12 November 1950 Final	Canovee	0–04 – 0–04	Newmarket	The Mardyke

=== Final replay ===
26 November 1950 Final replay	Canovee	3–06 – 1–04	Newmarket	Cork Athletic Grounds
