= 1983 Cork Intermediate Hurling Championship =

Irish hurling competition

- Dates: 8 May 1983 – 23 October 1983
- Teams: 18
- Champions: Cloughduv (4th title); Liam Lynch (captain)
- Runners-up: Ballinhassig; Ollie Jordan (captain)

Tournament statistics
- Matches played: 18
- Goals scored: 71 (3.94 per match)
- Points scored: 339 (18.83 per match)
- Top scorer(s): Denis Desmond (0-28)

The 1983 Cork Intermediate Hurling Championship was the 74th staging of the Cork Intermediate Hurling Championship since its establishment by the Cork County Board in 1909. The draw for the opening round fixtures took place on 30 January 1983. The championship began on 8 May 1983 and ended on 23 October 1983.

On 23 October 1983, Cloughduv won the championship following a 1-14 to 1-06 defeat of Ballinhassig in the final at Ballinora Sportsfield. This as their fourth championship title overall and their first title since 1973.

Éire Óg's Denis Desmond was the championship's top scorer with 0-28.

== Results ==
=== First round ===
8 May 1983 First round	Passage	3-06 - 4-07	Erin's Own	Carrigtwohill
	G Hanley 1-2, G O'Sullivan 1-1, R O'Sullivan 1-0, D Keane 0-1, K Keane 0-1, T Kingston 0-1.		B Hayes 2-0, PJ Murphy 1-1, G Bowen 1-1, M Bowen 0-3, K Horgan 0-1, B Murphy 0-1.

8 May 1983 First round	St. Vincent's	1-05 - 6-11	Cloughduv	Ovens
	P O'Regan 1-1, W McCarthy 0-1, D O'Callaghan 0-1, M O'Higgins 0-1, T Crowley 0-1.		P McDonnell 3-1, C Kelly 1-3, D O'Leary 1-1, P Lucey 1-0, T Barry-Murphy 0-2, T Dunne 0-2, M Ring 0-1.

=== Second round ===
8 May 1983 Second round	Castletownroche	5-13 - 0-08	Bishopstown	Fitzgerald Park
	M Magnier 3-1, F Fallon 1-3, E Walsh 1--, T Hogan 0-3, P Roche 0-2, W Walsh 0-2, P Walsh 0-1, Dave Relihan 0-1.		E Murphy 0-4, C Coffey 0-2, M Coughlan 0-1, P O'Shea 0-1.

8 May 1983 Second round	Ballinhassig	2-16 - 2-03	Tracton	Páirc Liam Mhic Cárthaigh
	B Coleman 1-7, S McCarthy 1-2, J Reynolds 0-3, D McCarthy 0-2, P Cussen 0-2,		K Kingston 2-0, A Jagoe 0-2, MJ Noonan 0-1.

22 May 1983 Second round	Newcestown	2-05 - 2-10	Bandon	Cloughduv
	T Crowley 1-3, K Kehilly 1-1, D O'Leary 0-1.		P Crowley 2-6, N Crowley 0-2, J Evans 0-1, P O'Donovan 0-1.

22 May 1983 Second round	Carrigtwohill	2-13 - 3-04	Mayfield	Páirc Uí Chonaill
	James Horgan 1-5, John Horgan 0-4, MJ Roche 1-0, P O'Connor 0-1, B Dineen 0-1, S Cashman 0-1, F Rohan 0-1.		Seán Lucey 1-1, T O'Donovan 1-0, K Hyland 1-0, S O'Connell 0-3.

29 May 1983 Second round	Blackrock	2-11 - 2-11	Éire Óg	Ballinhassig
	J Cashman 0-6, K Murphy 1-2, J Rothwell 1-0, D Cronin 0-1, M Lyons 0-1, P Kavanagh 0-1.		M Malone 2-1, D Desmond 0-3, L Flynn 0-2, B O'Leary 0-2, J O'Leary 0-1, J Flynn 0-1, M Flynn 0-1.

29 May 1983 Second round	Glen Rovers	2-08 - 3-09	Mallow	Moore Park
	P Ring 0-4, M Lynch 1-0, D Geaney 1-0, L Coffey 0-1, T Corbett 0-1, D Whitley 0-1, T Owens 0-1.		G Hayes 1-1, J Hayes 1-1, P Hayes 1-0, P Buckley 0-3, J Buckley 0-2, P Shine 0-2.

4 June 1983 Second round	St. Finbarr's	0-09 - 2-05	Inniscarra	Ovens
	S Murphy 0-5, M Kennedy 0-2, F Gannon 0-1, L Walsh 0-1.		T Buckley 1-1, J Feeney 1-0, T Ryan 0-2, M Healy 0-1, P Connell 0-1.

11 June 1983 Second round	Erin's Own	2-06 - 1-10	Cloughduv	Ballinora Sportsfield
	R O'Connor 2-0, G Bowen 0-3, M Bowen 0-2, PJ Murphy 0-1.		D O'Leary 0-5, T Barry-Murphy 1-0, C Kelly 0-2, P McDonnell 0-2, B McSweeney 0-1.

13 July 1983 Second round replay	Blackrock	0-10 - 4-14	Éire Óg	Ballinhassig
	K Murphy 0-5, T Deasy 0-2, E O'Donoghue 0-2, K Lyons 0-1.		D Desmond 0-8, D O'Flynn 1-2, M Flynn 1-1, B O'Leary 1-0, M Kelleher 1-0, J Kelleher 0-1, M Malone 0-1, J Lucey 0-1.

=== Quarter-finals ===
18 June 1983 Quarter-final	Carrigtwohill	0-16 - 3-09	Inniscarra	Church Road
	John Horgan 0-3, James Horgan 0-3, S Cashman 0-3, M Rohan 0-2, F Rohan 0-2, D Cashman 0-1, P O'Connor 0-1, B Dineen 0-1.		P O'Connell 1-6, J Feeney 2-0, T Ryan 0-2, M McDonnell 0-1.

19 June 1983 Quarter-final	Ballinhassig	2-12 - 2-05	Mallow	Inniscarra
	P Desmond 1-2, S McCarthy 1-2, J Reynolds 0-2, D McCarthy 0-2, D Brosnan 0-1, B Coleman 0-1, C Cottrell 0-1, F O'Leary 0-1.		J Buckley 1-1, J Hayes 1-0, P Buckley 0-2, J Hayes 0-1, T Coakley 0-1.

30 July 1983 Quarter-final	Éire Óg	3-17 - 2-10	Castletownroche	Riverstown Sportsfield
	D Desmond 0-9, M Malone 0-4, M Kelleher 1-0, M Flynn 1-0, B O'Leary 1-0, John Flynn 0-3, D Flynn 0-1.		Dave Relihan 1-4, T Hogan 1-2, D Mellerick 0-3, W Magnier 0-1.

10 September 1983 Quarter-final	Cloughduv	1-14 - 2-04	Bandon	Páirc Naomh Eoin
	C Kelly 0-4, T Barry-Murphy 1-0, P Lucey 0-3, M Ring 0-2, D O'Leary 0-2, P McDonnell 0-1, L Lynch 0-1, F Walsh 0-1.		C Daly 1-0, J Gabriel 1-0, P Crowley 0-3, J Evans 0-1,

=== Semi-finals ===
13 August 1983 Semi-final	Ballinhassig	2-07 - 0-12	Éire Óg	Ballinora Sportsfield
	C Cottrell 1-1, S McCarthy 1-1, D McCarthy 0-2, J Reynolds 0-1, F O'Leary 0-1, D Brosnan 0-1.		D Desmond 0-8, M Malone 0-1, M Kelleher 0-1, D Flynn 0-1, J Lucey 0-1.

2 October 1983 Semi-final	Cloughduv	2-11 - 0-08	Inniscarra	Ovens
	D O'Leary 1-2, C Barry-Murphy 1-1, P Lucey 0-3, J Grainger 0-3, M Ring 0-1, B McSweneey 0-1.		T Ryan 0-5, P McDonnell 0-1, M McDonnell 0-1, M O'Donoghue 0-1.

=== Final ===
23 October 1983 Final	Cloughduv	1-14 - 1-06	Ballinhassig	Ballinora Sportsfield
	D O'Leary 0-7, C Barry-Murphy 1-1, C Kelly 0-2, P McDonald 0-2, J Grainger 0-1, B McSweeney 0-1.		C Cottrell 1-1, J Reynolds 0-3, D McCarthy 0-1, B Coleman 0-1.

== Championship statistics ==
=== Top scorers ===
Overall

Rank	Player	Club	Tally	Total	Matches	Average
1	Denis Desmond	Éire Óg	0-28	28	4	7.00
2	Don O'Leary	Clougduv	2-17	23	5	4.60
3	Peadar McDonnell	Clougduv	3-07	16	5	3.20
4	Pádraig Crowley	Bandon	2-09	15	2	7.50
5	Seánie McCarthy	Ballinhassig	3-05	14	4	3.50
5	Connie Kelly	Cloughduv	1-11	14	5	2.80
7	Mick Malone	Éire Óg	2-07	13	4	3.25

In a single game

Rank	Player	Club	Tally	Total	Opposition
1	Pádraig Crowley	Bandon	2-06	12	Newcestown
2	Peadar McDonnell	Cloughduv	3-01	10	St. Vincent's
2	Mick Magnier	Castletownroche	3-01	10	Bishopstown
2	Brendan Coleman	Ballinhassig	1-07	10	Tracton
5	Pat O'Connell	Inniscarra	1-06	9	Carrigtwohill
5	Denis Desmond	Éire Óg	0-09	9	Castletownroche
7	James Horgan	Carrigtwohill	1-05	8	Mayfield
7	Denis Desmond	Éire Óg	0-08	8	Blackrock
7	Denis Desmond	Éire Óg	0-08	8	Ballinhassig
10	Mick Malone	Éire Óg	2-01	7	Blackrock
10	Dave Relihan	Castletownroche	1-04	7	Éire Óg
10	Don O'Leary	Clougduv	0-07	7	Ballinhassig
