= 1970 Cork Senior Hurling Championship =

Annual hurling competition season

- Dates: 19 April – 22 November 1970
- Teams: 16
- Champions: University College Cork (2nd title); Mick McCarthy (captain)
- Runners-up: Muskerry; Derry McSweeney (captain)

Tournament statistics
- Matches played: 15
- Goals scored: 86 (5.73 per match)
- Points scored: 290 (19.33 per match)
- Top scorer(s): Tomás Ryan (0-38)

The 1970 Cork Senior Hurling Championship was the 82nd staging of the Cork Senior Hurling Championship since its establishment by the Cork County Board in 1887. The championship began on 19 April 1970 and ended on 22 November 1970.

Glen Rovers entered the championship as the defending champions, however, they were defeated by University College Cork in the quarter-final.

The final was played on 22 November 1970 at the Athletic Grounds in Cork, between University College Cork and Muskerry, in what was their first ever meeting in a final. University College Cork won the match by 2–12 to 0–15 to claim their second championship title overall and a first title in seven years.

Muskerry's Tomás Ryan was the championship's top scorer with 0-38.

== Team changes ==
=== To Championship ===
Promoted from the Cork Intermediate Hurling Championship

- Youghal

== Results ==
=== First round ===
19 April 1970 First round	University College Cork	4-07 - 2-02	Na Piarsaigh	Cork Athletic Grounds, Cork
	M Dowling 1-3, E Fitzpatrick 1-1, N Morgan 1-0, H O'Sullivan 1-0, J Barrett 0-1, M Murphy 0-1, N Byrne 0-1.		J Connolly 1-2, T Mullins 1-0.	Referee: P Cronin (St. Finbarr's)

19 April 1970 First round	St. Finbarr's	0-19 - 1-08	St. Vincent's	Cork Athletic Grounds, Cork
	S Gillen 0-5, C McCarthy 0-5, G McCarthy 0-3, C Roche 0-2, M Archer 0-1, D Harrington 0-1, C Cullinane 0-1, M O'Mahony 0-1.		N Barry 1-4, J O'Shea 0-1, T O'Shea 0-1, D Lenihan 0-1, J Russell 0-1.	Referee: D O'Brien (Cobh)

26 April 1970 First round	Sarsfields	2-05 - 4-10	Glen Rovers	Cork Athletic Grounds, Cork
	B O'Mahony 1-0, S O'Riordan 1-0, E Kelleher 0-2, T McEvoy 0-1, S Walsh 0-1, B O'Keeffe 0-1.		P Harte 1-6, J Young 1-0, L McAuliffe 1-0, T O'Brien 1-0, M O'Halloran 0-1, J O'Sullivan 0-1, M Kenneally 0-1, T Corbett 0-1.	Referee: D O'Brien (Cobh)

26 April 1970 First round	Muskerry	1-15 - 2-06	Seandún	Cork Athletic Grounds, Cork
	T Ryan 0-12, B Kenneally 1-0, T Looney 0-3.		V Ring 1-1, P Doyle 1-0, E Dorney 0-2, S Lucey 0-2, G O'Shea 0-1.	Referee: D Twomey (Mitchelstown)

26 April 1970 First round	Duhallow	3-04 - 5-10	Imokilly	Páirc Mac Gearailt, Fermoy
	B Buckley 2-2, T Fitzgerald 1-0, S Stokes 0-1, DT Cronin 0-1.		B Aherne 3-0, K Fitzgerald 1-2, P Ring 0-4, P O'Riordan 1-0, S Barry 0-3, S O'Connor 0-1.	Referee: J Denning (Fermoy)

26 April 1970 First round	Carrigdhoun	5-08 - 4-13	Passage	Carrigaline Sportsfield, Carrigaline
	B Murphy 1-4, L Webb 1-2, J Murphy 1-1, D Coleman 1-0, B Coleman 1-0, D McCarthy 0-1.		E O'Brien 1-2, P Horan 0-5, D McDonnell 1-1, B Meade 1-1, P Quigley 1-0, J Murphy 0-3, M Donoghue 0-1.	Referee: F Murphy (Blackrock)

10 May 1970 First round	Youghal	9-12 - 6-06	Carbery	Cork Athletic Grounds, Cork
	F Keane 4-2, S Hennessy 2-1, S O'Leary 1-3, J Griffen 1-0, F Cooper 1-0, W Walsh 0-2, N Gallagher 0-2, P Hegarty 0-1, M Hodnett 0-1.		S Kearney 4-0, V O'Donovan 1-1, T Crowley 1-0, N Crowley 0-2, K Kehilly 0-2, L Hurley 0-1.	Referee: P Cronin (St. Finbarr's)

17 May 1970 First round	Blackrock	5-21 - 2-08	Avondhu	Clonmult Memorial Park, Midleton
	N O'Keeffe 2-6, B Cummins 2-2, J Horgan 1-1, J Russell 0-4, P Moylan 0-3, K Cummins 0-2, J O'Halloran 0-1, D Collins 0-1, F Cummins 0-1.		T Sheehan 1-5, P O'Brien 1-0, L Sheehan 0-1, P Moriarty 0-1, N Regan 0-1.	Referee: D O'Brien (Cobh)

=== Quarter-finals ===
31 May 1970 Quarter-final	Muskerry	3-08 - 1-11	Passage	Ballinhassig Sportsfield, Ballinhassig
	T Ryan 0-7, M Malone 2-1, P Lucey 1-0.		B Meade 1-5, J Murphy 0-3, E O'Brien 0-1, P Quigley 0-1, G O'Sullivan 0-1.	Referee: F Murphy (Blackrock)

19 June 1970 Quarter-final	St. Finbarr's	3-13 - 3-11	Blackrock	Cork Athletic Grounds, Cork
	C McCarthy 1-2, B Kirby 1-1, P Doolan 1-1, S Gillen 0-4, G McCarthy 0-2, C Cullinane 0-2, M O'Mahony 0-1, C Roche 0-1.		J Horgan 1-3, N O'Keeffe 1-3, J O'Halloran 1-0, D Collins 0-3, B Cummins 0-1, J Russell 0-1.	Referee: D O'Brien (Cobh)

21 June 1970 Quarter-final	Imokilly	4-10 - 1-08	Youghal	Clonmult Memorial Park, Midleton
	Brian Aherne 2-0, P Ring 1-4, S Barry 0-4, K Fitzgerald 1-0, Bernie Aherne 0-1, D Clifford 0-1.		F Cooper 1-0, N Gallagher 0-3, M Hodnett 0-2, S O'Leary 0-2, P Hegarty 0-1.	Referee: J Dennigan (Fermoy)

25 October 1970 Quarter-final	University College Cork	1-08 - 2-03	Glen Rovers	Cork Athletic Grounds, Cork
	H O'Sullivan 1-1, M Murphy 0-2, W Moore 0-1, R Cummins 0-1, S Looney 0-1, J Darcy 0-1, J Fitzpatrick 0-1.		P Murphy 1-0, J Daly 1-0, P Harte 0-3.	Referee: G Fitzgerald (Limerick)

=== Semi-finals ===
9 August 1970 Semi-final	Muskerry	3-15 - 3-09	Imokilly	Cork Athletic Grounds, Cork
	T Ryan 0-11, R Kenneally 2-1, P Lucey 1-1, C Kelly 0-1, N Dunne 0-1.		S Barry 2-8, D Clifford 1-0, P Ring 0-1.	Referee: P Cronin (St. Finbarr's)

8 November 1970 Semi-final	University College Cork	2-08 - 3-04	St. Finbarr's	Cork Athletic Grounds, Cork
	R Cummins 1-3, H O'Sullivan 1-1, T Buckley 0-3, M Crotty 0-1.		P Doolan 2-0, J Brady 1-1, G McCarthy 0-2, S Gillen 0-1.	Referee: G Fitzgerald (Limerick)

=== Final ===
22 November 1970 Final	University College Cork	2-12 - 0-16	Muskerry	Athletic Grounds, Cork
	R Cummins 2-3, T Buckley 0-5, H O'Sullivan 0-2, N Morgan 0-1, M Crotty 0-1.		T Ryan 0-8, C Kelly 0-4, P Lucey 0-3, M Malone 0-1.	Attendance: 13,031; Referee: F Murphy (Blackrock)

== Championship statistics ==
=== Top scorers ===
Top scorer overall

Rank	Player	Club	Tally	Total	Matches	Average
1	Tomás Ryan	Muskerry	0-38	38	4	9.50
2	Seánie Barry	Imokilly	2-15	21	3	7.00
3	Neally O'Keeffe	Blackrock	3-09	18	2	9.00
4	Ray Cummins	UCC	3-07	16	3	5.33
5	Brian Aherne	Imokilly	5-00	15	3	5.00
6	Frank Keane	Youghal	4-02	14	2	7.00
7	Henry O'Sullivan	UCC	3-04	13	4	3.25
8	Seán Kearney	Carbery	4-00	12	1	12.00
8	Bernie Meade	Passage	2-06	12	2	6.00
8	Patsy Harte	Glen Rovers	1-09	12	2	6.00

Top scorers in a single game

Rank	Player	Club	Tally	Total	Opposition
1	Frank Keane	Youghal	4-02	14	Carbery
1	Seánie Barry	Imokilly	2-08	14	Muskerry
3	Seán Kearney	Carbery	4-00	12	Youghal
3	Neally O'Keeffe	Blackrock	2-06	12	Avondhu
3	Tomás Ryan	Muskerry	0-12	12	Seandún
6	Tomás Ryan	Muskerry	0-11	11	Imokilly
7	Brian Aherne	Imokilly	3-00	9	Duhallow
7	Ray Cummins	UCC	2-03	9	Muskerry
7	Patsy Harte	Glen Rovers	1-06	9	Sarsfields
10	Brendan Buckley	Duhallow	2-02	8	Imokilly
10	Brendan Cummins	Blackrock	2-02	8	Avondhu
10	Tom Sheehan	Avondhu	1-05	8	Blackrock
10	Bernie Meade	Passage	0-08	8	Muskerry

=== Miscellaneous ===
- Muskerry qualified for the final for the first time in their history.
- Muskerry miss out on the double having won the 1970 Cork Senior Football Championship.
