= Canovee GAA =

GAA club in Cork, Ireland

Canovee
- Ceannmhaí
- Founded: 1932
- County: Cork
- Colours
- Grounds: Páirc Uí Laiġain

Playing kits
Standard colours

Senior Club Championships
	All Ireland	Munster champions	Cork champions
Football:	0	0	0

Canovee GAA is a Gaelic Athletic Association club in Carrigadrohid, County Cork, Ireland. The club is affiliated to the Muskerry Board and the Cork County Board and is solely concerned with the game of Gaelic football. Club members play hurling with the nearby Cloughduv club.

== History ==
Located in the village of Carrigadrohid, but also encompassing the Canovee and Aherla areas, the present Canovee GAA Club was founded in 1932. A club had previously existed, as both hurling and Gaelic football had been played in the locality since before the foundation of the GAA, however, this club became defunct around 1918.

Canovee has spent most of its existence operating in the junior grade, winning a record 17 Mid Cork JAFC titles between 1939 and 2023. The club won its first Cork JFC title in November 1950 and secured senior status for the first time. A second Cork JFC title followed in 1968, before Canovee returned to the top flight after claiming the Cork IFC title in 1973.

Canovee won a third Cork JAFC title in 2007, following a 1–08 to 0–09 win over Kildorrery in the final. The Munster Club JFC title was later won, following a win over O'Callaghan's Mills. Canovee ended the season by winning the All-Ireland Club JFC in February 2008, following a 1–08 to 0–05 defeat of Rock St Patrick's. The club has since added a fourth Cork JAFC title to their list of honours, following their title win in 2023.

== Honours ==
- Cork Intermediate Football Championship (1): 1973
- All-Ireland Junior Club Football Championship (1): 2008
- Munster Junior Club Football Championship (1): 2007
- Cork Junior A Football Championship (4): 1950, 1968, 2007, 2023
- Mid Cork Junior A Football Championship (17): 1939, 1943, 1946, 1947, 1948, 1949, 1950, 1955, 1957, 1961, 1962, 1968, 1979, 1982, 1999, 2007, 2023
- Mid Cork Junior C Football Championship (1): 2024
- Cork Under-21 B Football Championship (2): 2013, 2022

== Notable players ==
- J. J. Hinchion: All-Ireland JFC-winning captain (1951)
- Connie Kelly: Munster SFC-winner (1973)
- Dan O'Sullivan: All-Ireland JFC-winning captain (1955)
