= 1971 All-Ireland Junior Football Championship =

Inter-county Gaelic football competition for junior teams

All Ireland Champions
- Winners: London (5th win)

All Ireland Runners-up
- Runners-up: Dublin

Provincial Champions
- Munster: Cork
- Leinster: Dublin
- Ulster: Down
- Connacht: Mayo

The 1971 All-Ireland Junior Hurling Championship was the 50th staging of the All-Ireland Junior Championship since its establishment by the Gaelic Athletic Association in 1912.

London entered the championship as the defending champions.

The All-Ireland final was played on 7 November 1971 at the New Eltham Grounds in London, between London and Dublin, in what was their fourth meeting in the final and a first meeting in 11 years. London won the match by 1–09 to 0–09 to claim their fifth championship title overall and a third title in succession.

== Results ==
=== All-Ireland Junior Football Championship ===
==== All-Ireland semi-finals ====
1 August 1971 Semi-final	Dublin	0-15 - 1-06	Down	Croke Park

1 August 1971 Semi-final	Cork	1-15 - 2-10	Mayo	Cork Athletic Grounds

==== All-Ireland home final ====
24 October 1971 Home final	Dublin	1-14 - 2-05	Cork	Clonmel Grounds

==== All-Ireland final ====
7 November 1971 Final	London	1-09 - 0-09	Dublin	New Eltham Grounds
