= 1970 Cork Junior Hurling Championship =

Irish hurling competition

- Dates: 27 September - 29 November 1970
- Teams: 7
- Champions: Cloughduv (1st title); John Dunlea (captain)
- Runners-up: Courcey Rovers; Teddy Harrington (captain)

Tournament statistics
- Matches played: 6
- Goals scored: 36 (6 per match)
- Points scored: 106 (17.67 per match)
- Top scorer(s): Connie Kelly (3-13)

The 1970 Cork Junior Hurling Championship was the 73rd staging of the Cork Junior Hurling Championship since its establishment by the Cork County Board.

The final was played on 29 November 1970 at the Ballinhassig Grounds, between Cloughduv and Courcey Rovers, in what was their first ever meeting in the final. Cloughduv won the match by 3-15 to 2-04 to claim their second championship title overall and a first title in 30 years.

Cloughduv's Connie Kelly was the championship's top scorer with 3-13.

== Qualification ==
Division	Championship	Champions
Avondhu	North Cork Junior A Hurling Championship	Rathluirc
Carbery	South West Junior A Hurling Championship	Courcey Rovers
Carrigdhoun	South East Junior A Hurling Championship	Ballinhassig
Duhallow	Duhallow Junior A Hurling Championship	Meelin
Imokilly	East Cork Junior A Hurling Championship	Killeagh
Muskerry	Mid Cork Junior A Hurling Championship	Cloughduv
Seandún	City Junior A Hurling Championship	Blackrock

== Results ==
=== Quarter-finals ===
27 September 1970 Quarter-final	Blackrock	2-11 - 2-04	Ballinhassig	Minane Bridge Grounds
	J Redmond 1-4, J Hayes 1-4, A O'Leary 0-1, J O'Regan 0-1, E O'Donoghue 0-1.		Derry Coleman 1-4, M Hickey 1-0.

4 October 1970 Quarter-final	Rathluirc	7-06 - 1-20	Meelin	Kanturk Grounds
	J Madigan 3-0, T O'Grady 2-2, D Forde 2-0, J O'Shea 0-2, J Foley 0-1, B Gammell 0-1.		B Buckley 1-14, P Buckley 0-3, P McLoughlin 0-1, P O'Connor 0-1.

25 October 1970 Quarter-final	Courcey Rovers	4-13 - 3-04	Killeagh	Cork Athletic Grounds
	G Collins 1-8, O Crowley 1-3, L Hurley 1-0, A Hannon 1-0, T O'Mahony 0-1, T Harrington 0-1.		T Barry 1-1, N Treacy 1-1, J Moloney 1-0, J Foley 0-2.

=== Semi-finals ===
25 October 1970 Semi-final	Cloughduv	4-05 - 1-04	Blackrock	Kinsale Grounds
	C Kelly 1-4, P Lucey 1-1, M Walsh 1-0, D O'Riordan 1-0.		A O'Leary 1-1, J Hayes 0-2, J Redmond 0-2.

8 November 1970 Semi-final	Courcey Rovers	3-12 - 4-08	Rathluirc	Cork Athletic Grounds
	O Crowley 1-4, D O'Donovan 1-2, L Hurley 1-0, T O'Mahony 0-2, J O'Donovan 0-1, G Collins 0-1, J Crowley 0-1, T Harrington 0-1.		T O'Grady 1-2, J O'Shea 0-4, F O'Grady 1-0, J Foley 1-0, D Forde 1-0, K O'Shea 0-2.

=== Final ===
29 November 1970 Final	Cloughduv	3-15 - 2-04	Courcey Rovers	Ballinhassig Grounds
	C Kelly 2-9, M Walsh 1-0, G Kelly 0-2, N Dunne 0-2, T O'Mahony 0-1, T Kelly 0-1.		L Hurley 1-0, G Collins 1-0, J O'Donovan 0-2, A Hannon 0-1, O Crowley 0-1, T Harrington 0-1.	Referee: F Murphy (Blackrock)

== Championship statistics ==
=== Top scorers ===
Overall

Rank	Player	Club	Tally	Total	Matches	Average
1	Connie Kelly	Cloughduv	3-13	22	2	11.00
2	Brendan Buckley	Meelin	1-14	17	1	17.00
3	Gerry Collins	Courcey Rovers	2-09	15	3	5.00
4	Ollie Crowley	Courcey Rovers	2-08	14	3	4.66
5	Tommy O'Grady	Rathluirc	3-04	13	2	6.50

In a single game

Rank	Player	Club	Tally	Total	Opposition
1	Brendan Buckley	Meelin	1-14	17	Rathluirc
2	Connie Kelly	Cloughduv	2-09	15	Courcey Rovers
3	Gerry Collins	Courcey Rovers	1-08	11	Killeagh
4	John Madigan	Rathluirc	3-00	9	Meelin
5	Tommy O'Grady	Rathluirc	2-02	8	Meelin
6	John Redmond	Blackrock	1-04	7	Ballinhassig
6	John Hayes	Blackrock	1-04	7	Ballinhassig
6	Derry Coleman	Ballinhassig	1-04	7	Blackrock
6	Connie Kelly	Cloughduv	1-04	7	Blackrock
6	Ollie Crowley	Courcey Rovers	1-04	7	Rathluirc
