= 1968 Cork Junior Football Championship =

- Dates: 13 October – 17 November 1968
- Teams: 8
- Champions: Canovee (2nd title); John Dunlea (captain)
- Runners-up: Adrigole; Bernie O'Neill (captain)

Tournament statistics
- Matches played: 7
- Goals scored: 15 (2.14 per match)
- Points scored: 100 (14.29 per match)

The 1968 Cork Junior Football Championship was the 70th staging of the Cork Junior A Football Championship since its establishment by Cork County Board in 1895.

The final was played on 17 November 1968 at Sam Maguire Park in Dunmanway, between Canovee and Adrigole, in what was their first ever meeting in the final. Canovee won the match by 3–06 to 1–11 to claim their second championship title overall and a first title in 18 years.

== Results ==
=== Quarter-finals ===
13 October 1968 Quarter-final	Canovee	1–13 – 0–08	Carrigaline	Charlie Hurley Park
	L Nash 1–3, N Dunne 0–5, T O'Mahony 0–2, K Murphy 0–2, C Kelly 0–1.		B Wylie 0–6, D Murphy 0–1, R Cullinane 0–1.

13 October 1968 Quarter-final	Midleton	2–06 – 1–08	Bantry Blues	Charlie Hurley Park
	W Glavin 1–4, D Cotter 1–0, T O'Donoghue 0–2.		D Hunt 0–5, D Barron 1–0, V O'Callaghan 0–1, D Dineen 0–1, D Cotter 0–1.

13 October 1968 Quarter-final	Adrigole	2–06 – 1–01	Mayfield	Ballingeary Grounds
				Referee: D O'Mahony (Kilmichael)

27 October 1968 Quarter-final	Kilshannig	4–04 – 0–11	Newmarket	Kanturk Grounds
	D O'Sullivan 2–0, D Reidy 1–0, M Cronin 1–0, C Walsh 0–2, D Cremin 0–1.		M Flanagan 0–4, N Collins 0–3, M O'Halloran 0–2, W Daly 0–1, J Deasy 0–1.

=== Semi-finals ===
3 November 1968 Semi-final	Canovee	0–08 – 0–07	Midleton	Ballinhassig Grounds
	N Dunne 0–6, TJ Lyons 0–1, T O'Mahony 0–1.		W Glavin 0–5, D Sweeney 0–1.

3 November 1968 Semi-final	Adrigole	0–09 – 0–02	Kilshannig	Sam Maguire Park
	M Regan 0–5, EJ O'Sullivan 0–3, PJ O'Sullivan 0–1.		J Horgan 0–1, C Walsh 0–1.

=== Final ===
17 November 1968 Final	Canovee	3–06 – 1–11	Adrigole	Sam Maguire Park
	C Lehane 1–2, C Kelly 1–1, TJ Lyons 1–0, L Nash 0–2, L Walsh 0–1.		PJ O'Sullivan 1–1, M O'Regan 0–4, B O'Neill 0–3, BJ O'Sullivan 0–1, EJ O'Sullivan 0–1, JJ O'Sullivan 0–1.	Referee: T Downey (Clonakilty)
