= Bernie Meade =

Cork hurler

Personal information
- Born: 1948 (age 77–78) Carrigaline, County Cork, Ireland
- Occupation: Fitter

Sport
- Sport: Hurling
- Position: Centre-forward
Clubs
- Years: Club
- Passage → Seandún; St Finbarr's
Club titles
- All-Ireland Titles: 1
Inter-county
Years	County	Apps (scores)
1969–1971	Cork	0 (0–0)
Inter-county titles
- Munster titles: 0
- All-Irelands: 0
- NHL: 1

Patrick D. B. Meade (born 1948), known as Bernie Meade, is an Irish former hurler. At club level he played with Passage and St Finbarr's and was also a member of the Cork senior hurling team. He usually lined out as a forward.

== Career ==
Meade first played at juvenile and underage levels with the Passage club and had a career that spanned three decades with the club's top adult team. He transferred briefly to the St Finbarr's club and won an All-Ireland Club Championship title in 1980. He also lined out with the Seandún divisional side as both a hurler and Gaelic footballer. Meade first appeared on the inter-county scene on Cork's 1966 All-Ireland Minor Championship-winning team. He later won successive All-Ireland Under-21 Championship titles, with his scoring tally of 1–12 in the 1968 All-Ireland under-21 final remaining an all-time record. Meade was drafted onto the Cork senior hurling team during their successful 1968-69 National League campaign. He played a number of league and tournament games for Cork over the following few seasons; however, he was not selected for the championship team.

== Honours ==
St Finbarr's

- All-Ireland Senior Club Hurling Championship: 1978

Cork

- National Hurling League: 1968-69
- All-Ireland Under-21 Hurling Championship: 1968, 1969
- Munster Under-21 Hurling Championship: 1968, 1969
- All-Ireland Minor Hurling Championship: 1966
- Munster Minor Hurling Championship: 1966
