= Cloughduv GAA =

GAA club in Cork, Ireland

Cloughduv
- Cloch Dhubh
- Founded: 1889
- County: Cork
- Colours
- Grounds: Cloughduv GAA Grounds

Playing kits
Standard colours

Senior Club Championships
	All Ireland	Munster champions	Cork champions
Hurling:	0	0	0
Camogie:	0	0	3

Cloughduv GAA is a Gaelic Athletic Association club located in Cloughduv, County Cork, Ireland. The club is affiliated to the Muskerry Board and the Cork County Board. As a sister club of Canovee and Kilmurry, Cloughduv is solely concerned with hurling.

== History ==
Hurling had been played in the area since before the foundation of the Gaelic Athletic Association in 1884. Ryecourt GAA Club represented the Cloughduv area and was one of the 21 clubs that affiliated to the newly-established Cork County Board in December 1886. The club name became Cloughduv in 1889.

Cloughduv had its first notable success in 1911, when the club won the Cork IHC title after a 6–02 to 3–01 win over Blackrock in the final. Further Cork IHC titles were claimed in 1941, 1973, 1983 and 1986. Cloughduv amalgamated with Bride Valley in 1928 to form a new club called Éire Óg, however, Cloughduv later broke away and returned to being a club in its own right.

At junior divisional level, Cloughduv have dominated the Mid Cork JAHC since its inception. The club has won a record 25 titles between 1933 and 2019, while three of these divisional titles were subsequently converted into Cork JAHC titles. Cloughduv won the Munster Club JHC title in December 2018, following a 0–17 to 0–11 win over Ballinameela in the final.

== Honours ==
=== Hurling ===
- Cork Intermediate Hurling Championship (5): 1911, 1941, 1973, 1983, 1986
- Munster Junior Club Hurling Championship (1): 2018
- Cork Junior A Hurling Championship (3): 1940, 1970, 2018
- Mid Cork Junior A Hurling Championship (25): 1933, 1938, 1939, 1940, 1948, 1950, 1951, 1953, 1956, 1957, 1959, 1964, 1967, 1970, 1994, 2002, 2006, 2009, 2010, 2011, 2014, 2015, 2017, 2018, 2019
- Cork Minor A Hurling Championship (1): 2009

=== Camogie ===
- Cork Senior Camogie Championship (3): 2001, 2002, 2005

== Notable players ==
- Dinny Barry-Murphy: All-Ireland SHC-winning captain (1929)
- Briege Corkery: All-Ireland SCC-winner (2005, 2006, 2008, 2009, 2014, 2015, 2018)
- Aoife Murray: All-Ireland SCC-winner (2002, 2005, 2006, 2008, 2009, 2014, 2015, 2017, 2018)
- Kevin Murray: All-Ireland SHC-winner (1999)
