= Con Cottrell =

Irish hurler

Personal information
- Native name: Conn Mac Oitiril (Irish)
- Born: 2 May 1917 Ballinhassig, County Cork, Ireland
- Died: 3 March 1982 (aged 64) Wilton, Cork, Ireland
- Occupation: Roman Catholic priest
- Height: 5 ft 8 in (173 cm)

Sport
- Sport: Hurling
- Position: Midfield
Clubs
- Years: Club
- Valley Rovers; Ballinhassig; Cooley Kickhams
Club titles
- Cork titles: 0
Inter-county
Years	County	Apps (scores)
1941-1947	Cork	19 (0-05)
Inter-county titles
- Munster titles: 5
- All-Irelands: 5
- NHL: 0

Cornelius Cottrell (2 May 1917 – 3 March 1982) was an Irish hurler. His career included stints with club sides Valley Rovers, Ballinhassig and Cooley Kickhams, while he was also a five-time All-Ireland Championship winner with the Cork senior hurling team.

After playing at junior club level, Cottrell was drafted onto the Cork senior team for the 1941 senior championship. From his debut, he developed a midfield partnership with Jack Lynch and made 19 championship appearances in a career that ended with his last game in the 1947 All-Ireland final. During that time Cottrell was part of five All-Ireland Championship-winning teams, including Cork's record-breaking four titles in-a-row between 1941 and 1944. He also secured five Munster Championship medals.

== Playing career ==
=== Cooley Kickhams ===
During his studies with the Rosminian Order in Dundalk, Cottrell joined the Cooley Kickhams club. In Gaelic football, he won a county senior championship medal with the club in 1939 after lining out at right wing-forward in the 3–13 to 1–06 defeat of Newtown Blues.

=== Valley Rovers ===
On returning to Cork, Cottrell joined the Innishannon-based Valley Rovers club. He had his greatest club success when the club claimed the 1941 South East Junior Championship, with Cottrell being described as a "shining light" in the 5–07 to 5–03 victory over Tracton. Cottrell also briefly lined out with the Ballinhassig club.

=== Cork ===
Cottrell was added to the Cork senior hurling panel in advance of the 1941 Munster Championship and was described in the Irish Press as being "the best young hurler Cork has produced for many a day". He made his debut on 14 September 1941 when he lined out at centre-back in Cork's 8–10 to 3–02 defeat of Limerick and was described as having "lived up to expectations". Cottrell retained his position at centre-back for the 1941 All-Ireland final against Dublin. He ended the game with his first All-Ireland medal after the 5–11 to 0–06 victory. Cottrell ended the season by lining out in Cork's 5–04 to 2–05 defeat by Tipperary in the delayed Munster final.

Cottrell lined out in his second Munster final in 1942, with Cork claiming the Munster title after a 4–15 to 4–01 defeat of Tipperary. He was dropped from the starting fifteen in favour of Alan Lotty for the subsequent 1942 All-Ireland final against Dublin but was eventually listed amongst the reserves when it had looked like he would miss the game altogether. Cottrell remained as an unused substitute throughout the game, but collected his second successive winners' medal after a 2–14 to 3–04 victory.

Restored to the starting fifteen for the 1943 Munster Championship, Cottrell won his second provincial winners' medal after a 2–13 to 3–08 victory over Waterford in that years final. He was later included as midfield partner to Jack Lynch for the 1943 All-Ireland final against Antrim and scored two points on the way to his third successive All-Ireland winners' medal after the 5–16 to 0–04 victory.

Cottrell claimed a third successive Munster Championship winners' medal after a 4–06 to 3–06 victory over Limerick in the 1944 Munster final replay. On 3 September 1944, he again partnered Jack Lynch at midfield in a second successive All-Ireland final and Cork's fourth successive appearance in the decider overall. Cottrell scored a point from play and ended the 2–13 to 1–02 victory over Dublin by becoming one of a select group of players to have won four successive All-Ireland medals.

After failing to secure a fifth successive title in 1945, Cottrell won a fourth provincial championship winners' medal after lining out at midfield in the 3–08 to 1–03 defeat of Limerick in the 1946 Munster final. For the fifth time in six seasons, he lined out in the subsequent All-Ireland final with Kilkenny providing the opposition. Cottrell claimed a fifth All-Ireland winners' medal after playing at midfield in the 7–05 to 3–08 victory.

Cottrell missed Cork's first two games of the 1947 Munster Championship but claimed a fifth winners' medal after being restored to midfield for the 2–06 to 2–03 defeat of Limerick in the 1947 final. He was again at midfield for his sixth All-Ireland final in September 1947, but ended the game on the losing side after the 0–14 to 2–07 defeat by Kilkenny. This was Cottrell's final championship appearance for Cork as his ordination to the priesthood rule him out of any further inter-county activity.

=== Munster ===
Cottrell was first selected for the Munster team during the 1944 Railway Cup. He claimed his first Railway Cup medal that year after lining out at left wing-back in Munster's 4–10 to 4–04 defeat of Connacht in the final. Cottrell claimed a second successive Railway Cup medal the following year after playing at midfield in Munster's 6–08 to 2–00 victory over Ulster in the 1945 final.

== Personal life ==
Cottrell entered the Rosminian Order at the age of 18 in 1935 and was ordained to the priesthood in 1947. He worked for a number of years at St. Patrick's Industrial School in Upton and later became Superior at St. Joseph's Industrial School near Clonmel. As superior of St. Joseph's School for the Blind in Drumcondra, he was involved in developing services for the welfare of the blind and partially sighted and in setting up workshops for the blind. After an illness, Cottrell returned to St. Patrick's in Upton in the early 1970s and established a residential centre for adults with special needs. He returned to Dublin for a short period to continue his work for the blind but remained in poor health.

On 3 March 1982, Cottrell died aged 64 at the Regional Hospital in Cork. He was survived by his two brothers and a sister.

== Honours ==
Cooley Kickhams

- Louth Senior Football Championship (1): 1939

Valley Rovers

- South East Junior A Hurling Championship (1): 1941

Cork

- All-Ireland Senior Hurling Championship (5): 1941, 1942, 1943, 1944, 1946
- Munster Senior Hurling Championship (5): 1942, 1943, 1944, 1946, 1947

Munster

- Railway Cup (2): 1944, 1945
