= Grace Dieu =

Grace Dieu (French, 'Grace of God') may refer to:

- Grace-Dieu, a place in Leicestershire, England
  - Grace Dieu Priory
  - Grace Dieu Manor
  - Grace Dieu Manor School
  - Grace Dieu and High Sharpley, a biological and geological Site of Special Scientific Interest
  - FCV Grace Dieu, a football club
- Grace Dieu (ship), the flagship of King Henry V, launched in 1418
- Grace Dieu Abbey, in County Dublin, Ireland
- Grace Dieu Abbey, Monmouth, Wales
- Grâce à Dieu, or By the Grace of God, a 2019 French film

== See also ==
- Henry Grace à Dieu, a Tudor-era warship
