= St Mary's Church, Loughborough =

St Mary's Church
- St Mary of the Annunication Church
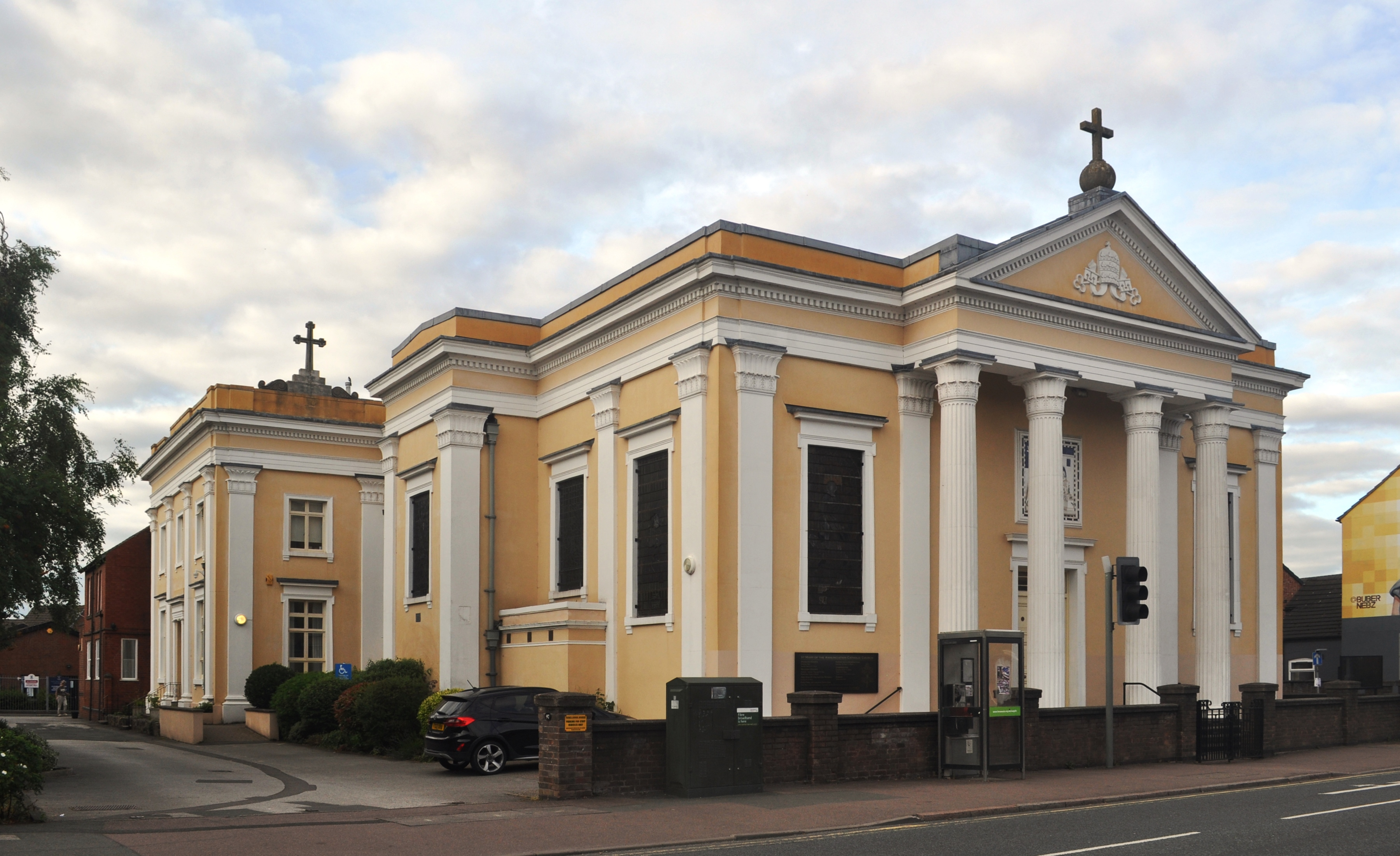
- The church in June 2025
- St Mary's Church
- 52.7725°N 1.2157°W
- OS grid reference: SK 53009 19723
- Location: Loughborough
- Country: England
- Denomination: Roman Catholic
- Religious institute: Rosminians
- Website: StMarysLoughborough.org.uk

History
- Status: Active
- Founder: Fr Benjamin Hulme
- Dedication: Mary, mother of Jesus

Architecture
- Functional status: Parish church
- Heritage designation: Grade II listed
- Designated: 5 November 1984
- Architect(s): William Flint; A. M. Barrowcliffe
- Style: Neoclassical
- Completed: 1834

Administration
- Province: Westminster
- Diocese: Nottingham
- Deanery: Loughborough
- Parish: St Mary's

St Mary's Church or St Mary of the Annunciation Church is a Roman Catholic parish church in Loughborough, Leicestershire, England. It was built in 1834 in the neoclassical style and has been served by the Rosminians since 1841, it was their first church in the UK, and outside of Italy. It is located opposite the junction of Ashby Road and Radmoor Road to the west of the town centre. It is a Grade II listed building.

== History ==
=== Construction ===
In 1833, Fr Benjamin Hulme came to Loughborough and started a mission there. He organised the purchasing of the site of the current church and commissioned an architect, William Flint from Leicester, to design the church. In 1834, the church and the presbytery next to it were built.

=== Rosminians ===
In 1838, the Rosminians were ratified in Rome. In 1839, the first of Rosminian vows were made. The only country the Rosminians worked in, outside of Italy, was the UK. In 1841, led by Aloysius Gentili, they began serving the church. In 1845, from the church, they founded Radcliffe College.

=== Extension ===
In 1920s, the church was enlarged. A new nave and portico entrance were added facing on to the street. They were designed by a local architect A. M. Barrowcliffe. In 1933, a new high altar was consecrated. In 1937, marble altar rails were added. The parts of the church from before the extensions were added became the chancel, Lady chapel and sacristy.

== Parish ==
St Mary's Church is its own parish. It has four Sunday Masses at 6:00pm on Saturday, 9:00am and 11:15am on Sunday and a Mass in Italian at 4:00pm on Sunday. Mass in the Traditional (1962) form in Latin is usually offered on Wednesday at 6.30pm

== See also ==
- Diocese of Nottingham
