= Richard Leigh (martyr) =

English Roman Catholic martyr

Blessed Richard Leigh
- Born: Cambridgeshire, England
- Died: 30 August 1588; Tyburn, London, England
- Venerated in: Roman Catholic Church
- Beatified: 15 December 1929 by Pope Pius XI
- Feast: 30 August

Richard Leigh (c. 1557 – 1588) was an English Roman Catholic martyr born in Cambridge, the scion of Cheshire gentry, squires of the West Hall, High Legh since the 11th century.

== Life ==
Leigh coat of arms

Richard Leigh was the son of Richard Leigh, who attended Cambridge University, and Clemence Holcroft, daughter of Sir John Holcroft. He was the subject of a childhood arranged marriage at Middleton, 22 September 1562 with Anne Belfield (married in 1574 William Assheton, steward of the manor of Rochdale), daughter of Ralph Belfield, of Clegg Hall, who had died without a male heir in 1552. Her sister, Elizabeth, was married on the same day to Alexander Barlow (later Sir Alexander Barlow) and both marriages were subsequently annulled on the grounds of being so young that "doth not remember that he ever was marryed."

Leigh attended Shrewsbury School before studying divinity at Reims and at Rome, where he was ordained in 1586. He returned to England but before reaching Cheshire, was arrested in London and banished. He returned to England again and was arrested on 4 July 1588, about two weeks before the arrival of the Spanish Armada. In the aftermath of the failed invasion, there was an immediate reaction against Catholics.

Imprisoned in the Tower of London, he was condemned at the Old Bailey for being a priest and hanged at Tyburn on 30 August 1588, with five others who have been declared Venerable: Richard Martin, John Roche, Edward Shelley, Richard Lloyd (alias Flower) and Margaret Ward. Leigh was beatified by Pope Pius XI in 1929.

== See also ==
- List of Catholic martyrs of the English Reformation
