= Richard Martin (martyr) =

English Catholic martyr (16th century)

Blessed Richard Martin

Martyr
- Born: Shropshire, England
- Died: 30 August 1588; Tyburn, London, England
- Venerated in: Roman Catholic Church
- Beatified: 15 December 1929 by Pope Pius XI
- Feast: 30 August

Richard Martin (died 1588) was an English martyr. A layman, Martin was charged with being a "receiver and maintainer of priests" for having bought supper for Robert Morton, a priest.

== Background ==
In the wake of the failure of the Spanish Armada, the English government decided to proceed against the Catholics in the realm as a counter-move. On the initiative of Robert Dudley, 1st Earl of Leicester, new gallows were erected in six locations. From 14 to 20 August 1588 a general examination of all prisoners then in custody because of religion was conducted by order of the Privy Council, with the reports delivered to Crown Advocate John Puckering to prepare indictments.

== Richard Martin ==
Richard Martin was born in Shropshire, and attended Broadgates Hall, Oxford, where he was granted a Master of Arts degree on 12 December 1583. He was arrested in the company of Robert Morton, a priest. The law at that time declared that those who knowingly "shall receive, relieve, aid, or comfort a seminary priest, are felons..." Martin was charged with being a "receiver and maintainer of priests" because he had bought supper for Morton for sixpence. It appears that while at Newgate Prison, Martin admitted being reconciled to the Catholic Church.

Martin was hanged, drawn and quartered on 30 August 1588 at Tyburn, along with Blesseds Richard Leigh, Edward Shelley, John Roche and Richard Flowers, and St. Margaret Ward. Martin was beatified in 1929. His feast day is 30 August.

Blessed Robert Morton

Priest, Martyr
- Born: c. 1547 - 48; Bawtry, Yorkshire, England
- Died: 26 August 1588 (aged 40 or 41); Lincoln’s Inn Fields, London
- Venerated in: Roman Catholic Church
- Beatified: 15 December 1929 by Pope Pius XI
- Feast: 30 August

== Robert Morton ==
Robert Morton was born in 1547 at Bawtry, Yorkshire, the son of Robert and Anne Morton. At the age of twenty-six, he entered the English College, Douai, but his theological studies were interrupted with the death of his father. He later continued his studies at Rheims. In 1586, he travelled with his uncle, Nicholas Morton D.D., to Rome, where his uncle later died. Robert had a memorial tablet in his uncle's memory erected in the chapel of the English College, Rome.

He was ordained deacon at Rome and priest at Reims on 14 June 1587. Morton was apprehended shortly after arriving in England and condemned at the Old Bailey on 26 August 1588 for being a priest contrary to the Jesuits, etc. Act 1584. On 28 August 1588, Morton was hanged at the new gallows erected at Lincoln’s Inn Fields, London.

== Hugh More ==
Hugh More was born about 1563 in Grantham, Lincolnshire. In 1581 he entered Broadgates Hall, Oxford, and in 1583 Gray's Inn, London, to study law. He was received into the Catholic Church in 1584 or 1585 by Fr. Thomas Stephenson, and was immediately disinherited by his father, a staunch Protestant. In June 1585 he entered the English College at Rheims, but had returned to England by May 1587 as his health had collapsed. He was soon arrested, and refusing to attend a Protestant church was tried and condemned at the Old Bailey for having been "reconciled to the See of Rome by one Thomas Stephenson". He was executed, along with Robert Morton, at Lincoln's Inn Fields on 28 August 1588.

== Others martyred at that time ==
- Near the Theatre, William Gunter, a priest, born at Raglan, Monmouthshire, educated at Reims
- At Clerkenwell, Thomas Holford, a priest, born at Aston, in Acton, Cheshire, educated at Reims, who was hanged only
- Between Brentford and Hounslow, Middlesex, James Claxton or Clarkson, a priest, born in Yorkshire and educated at Reims
- Thomas Felton, born at Bermondsey Abbey in 1567, son of B. John Felton, tonsured 1583 and about to be professed a Minim, who had suffered terrible tortures in prison.

== Sources ==
- "St. Richard Martin" Catholic Online, Saints and Angels, Retrieved 2009-11-06.
