= William Lockhart (priest) =

English Catholic priest (1820–1892)

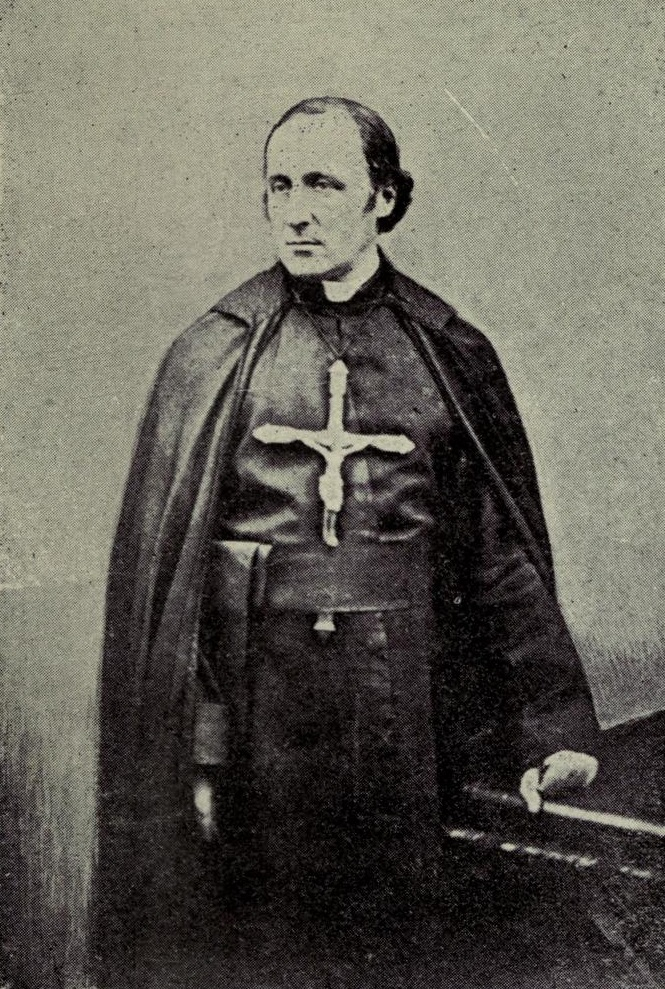
- Born: 22 August 1820
- Died: 15 May 1892 (aged 71); Holborn, London, England
- Occupation: Catholic priest

William Lockhart (22 August 1820 – 15 May 1892) was an English Catholic priest. He was the first member of the Tractarian Movement to convert from Anglicanism to Roman Catholicism.

== Early life ==
William Lockhart was born on 22 August 1820. He was the son of the Reverend Alexander Lockhart of Warlingham, Surrey (grandson of Alexander Lockhart, Lord Covington). He was a cousin of J. G. Lockhart, biographer of Sir Walter Scott. After studying first at Bedford School and, afterwards under various tutors, he entered Exeter College, Oxford, in 1838. He there made the acquaintance of Edward Douglas, afterwards head of the Redemptorists at Rome, the Jesuit Ignatius Grant and John Ruskin.

The reading of Hurrell Froude's Remains and Frederick William Faber's Foreign Churches caused him to question that Protestantism alone represented the religion of the Apostles. To set his doubts at rest, he visited Henry Edward Manning at Lavington, but felt so awed in the archdeacon's presence that he did not dare to enter into a controversy. Subsequently, Manning urged Lockhart to accept John Henry Newman's invitation to stay with him at Littlemore and prepare for ordination in the Church of England. After graduating Bachelor of Arts in 1842, he rejoined Newman at Littlemore and was assigned the task of translating a portion of Andrew of Fleury's History of the Church and of writing a life of Gilbert of Sempringham for the Oxford Series.

== Conversion to Catholicism ==
In his seclusion, Lockhart's weakened faith in Anglicanism was shaken by the study of John Milner's End of Religious Controversy, given him by Grant, who had become a Catholic in 1841. Lockhart now realised for the first time what Catholic doctrine was and he saw his own doubts confirmed in the irresolution of Newman, at this time seeking his Via media between Catholicism and Anglicanism. After a few weeks' hesitation, he declared to Newman that he could not go on for Anglican ordination as he doubted its validity. Newman sent him to W. G. Ward, who persuaded him to return to Littlemore for three years.

About a year later, however, his meeting with Father Aloysius Gentili of the newly formed Institute of Charity (Rosminians), at Ward's rooms, brought matters to a crisis. In August 1843, he visited Gentili at Loughborough, intending to stay only a few hours, but his visit resulted in a three-day retreat and his reception into the Catholic Church.

On 29 August he was received into the Rosminian Institute; he made his simple vows on 7 April 1844, and his solemn profession on 8 September 1845. He was the first of the Tractarians to become a Catholic, and his conversion greatly affected Newman, who shortly afterwards preached at Littlemore his last sermon as an Anglican, "The Parting of Friends".

All communications between Lockhart and his mother ceased by Manning's orders, but mother and son were soon reconciled, and in July 1846 Mrs Lockhart followed her son into the Catholic Church. In November 1844, he was included in the new community at Calvary House, Ratcliffe on the Wreake, the first Rosminian foundation in England.

== Later years ==
He was ordained subdeacon at St Mary's College, Oscott on 19 December 1845, and deacon on 5 June 1846, and on 19 December of the same year was raised to the priesthood at Ratcliffe College. After some months devoted to the preaching of missions, Lockhart was entrusted with the pastoral charge of Shepshed on 5 June 1847. He was still occasionally employed for mission work and in 1850 was definitely appointed for this duty. After some years of successful preaching in various parts of England and Ireland, he was compelled, owing to ill health, to spend the winter of 1853 in Rome. On his return journey, he paid a memorable visit to Antonio Rosmini-Serbati, at Stresa.

In 1854 he was deputed to select a suitable place in London for the establishment of a house and church of his order. At the suggestion of Manning, he chose Kingsland, and until 1875 he served as the first parish priest of Our Lady and St Joseph’s Church. In 1873 he purchased at his own expense St Etheldreda's Church out of Chancery, and thus restored one of London's oldest churches (thirteenth century) to Roman Catholic worship; he served there until his death. He continued for many years to give missions and retreats. After 1881 he spent the winters in Rome as procurator general of the congregation, and was there frequently called upon to give a series of sermons in English. His death, of syncope, occurred unexpectedly at St Etheldreda's.

He was perhaps best known as the foremost English disciple of Rosmini, founder of the Institute of Charity. Several volumes of Rosmini's works were translated either by him or under his supervision and in 1886 he wrote the second volume of the Life of Antonio Rosmini-Serbati, of which the first volume had been written by G.S. MacWalter in 1883. He was an able polemicist and was closely connected with two well-known Catholic periodicals, Catholic Opinion, which he founded and conducted until it was merged in The Tablet, and The Lamp, to which he was for twenty years the principal contributor.

== Publications ==
His publications include;

- Review of Dr Pusey's Eirenicon (2nd ed., London, 1866), reprinted from "The Weekly Register"
- Communion of Saints (London, 1868)
- The Old Religion (2nd ed., London, 1870)
- Life of Antonio Rosmini-Serbati (1886)
- Cardinal Newman. Reminiscences of fifty years since by one of his oldest living Disciples (London, 1891).

For some years before his death he had been engaged on a second volume to form a sequel to The Old Religion, the best-known of his polemical works.
