= St Etheldreda's Church, London =

St Etheldreda's Church, Ely Place
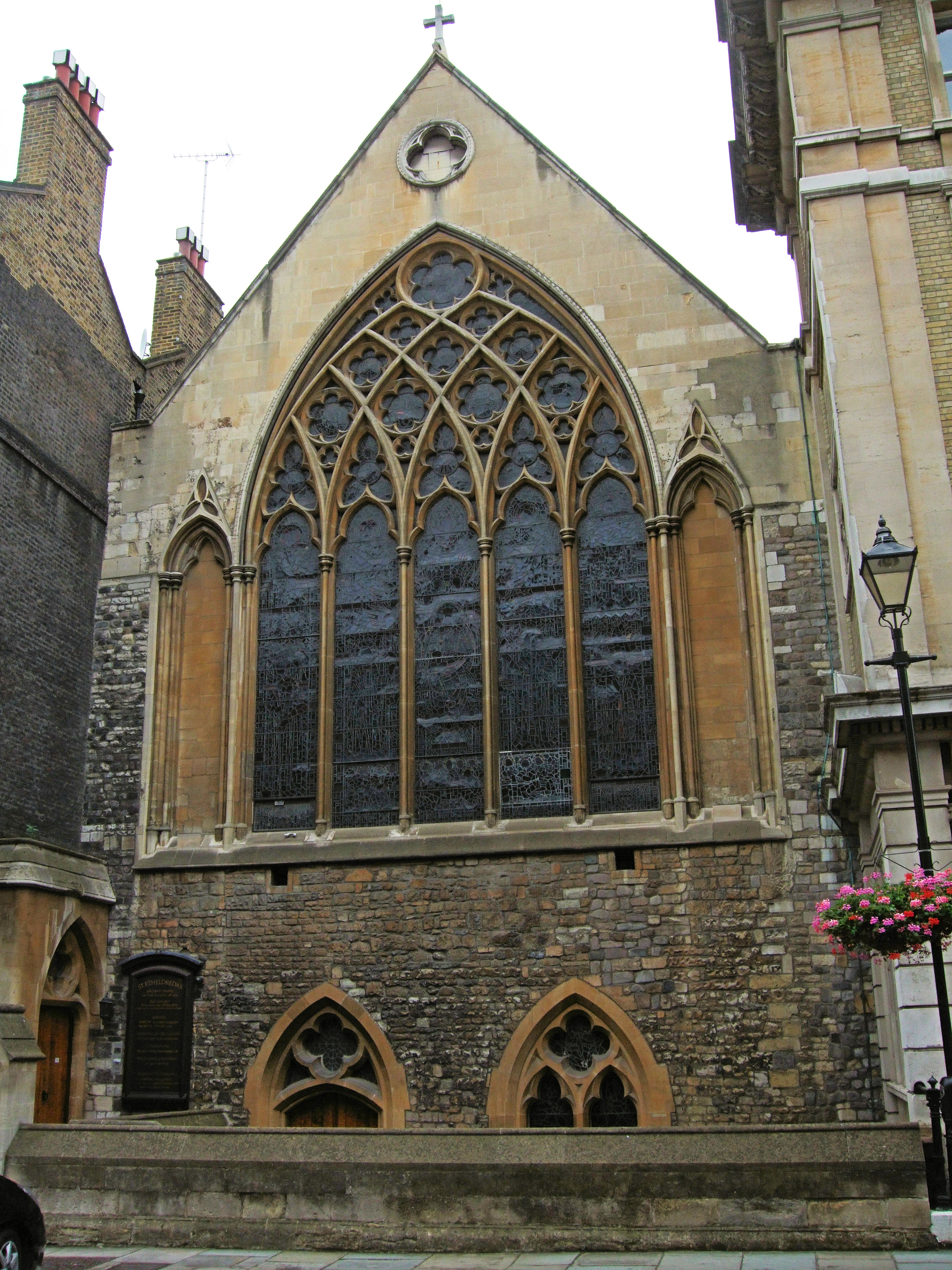
- Exterior as viewed from Ely Place
- St Etheldreda's Church, Ely Place
- 51°31′07″N 0°06′27″W
- OS grid reference: TQ 31411 81673
- Location: Holborn, London
- Country: England
- Denomination: Catholic Church
- Website: www.stetheldreda.com

History
- Status: Active
- Founded: 1290
- Dedication: Saint Etheldreda

Architecture
- Functional status: Parish church
- Heritage designation: Grade I
- Designated: 24 October 1951

Administration
- Archdiocese: Westminster

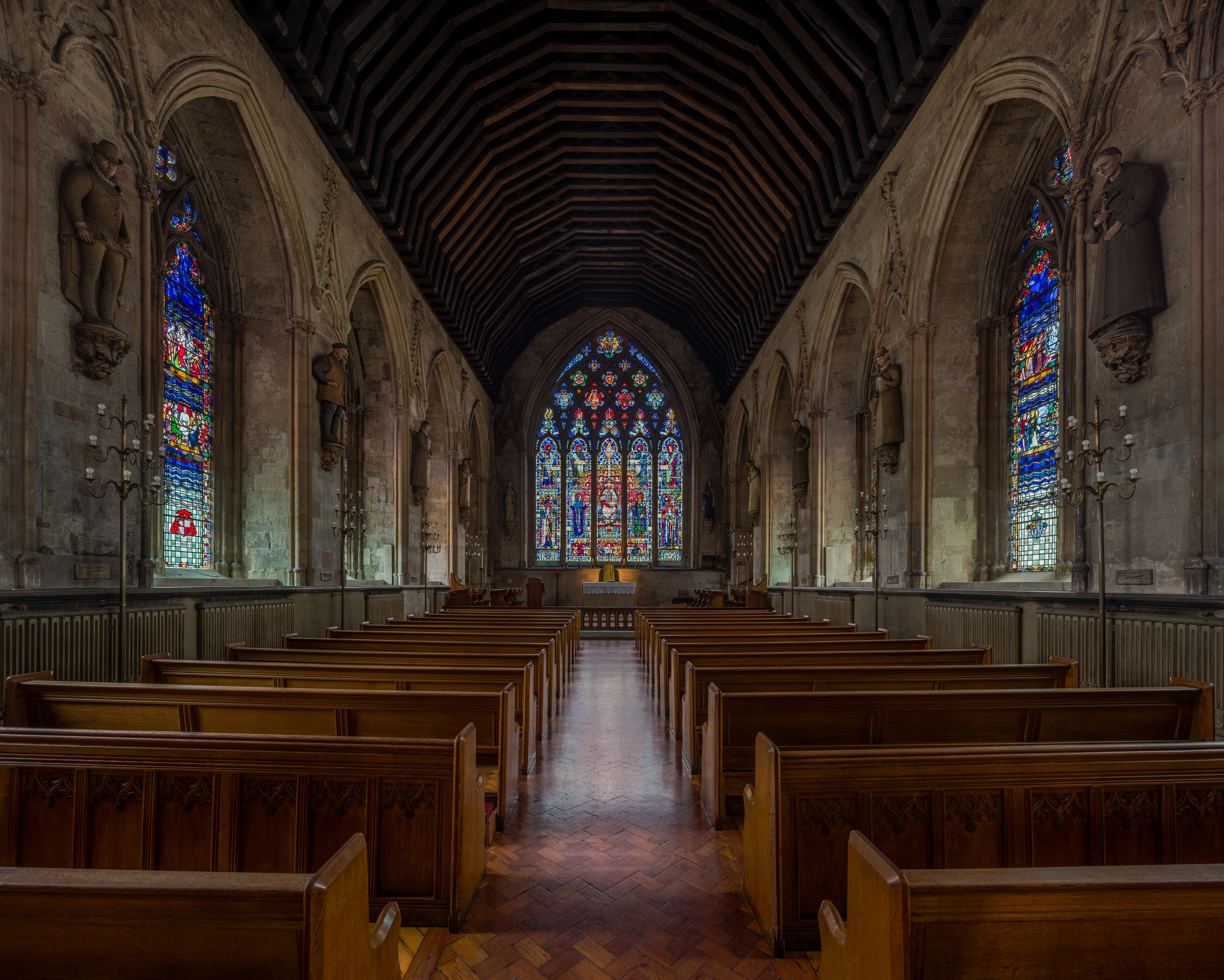
Interior of St Etheldreda's Upper Church, facing east towards the altar

St Etheldreda's Church is a Catholic church in Ely Place, off Charterhouse Street in Holborn, London. The building is one of only two surviving in London from the reign of Edward I, and dates from around the 1280s, though sources vary. It is dedicated to Æthelthryth, or Etheldreda, the Anglo-Saxon saint who founded the monastery at Ely in 673. It was the chapel of the London residence of the Bishops of Ely.

In the early 17th century it served briefly as an embassy chapel for the Spanish Ambassador, and a haven for English Catholics. The chapel was purchased by the Catholic Church in 1874 and opened in 1878 and is one of the oldest churches in England to be in current use by the Catholic Church.

== Description ==
Audio description of the church by Julie Etchingham

St Etheldreda's consists of a chapel, or upper church, and a crypt or undercroft, and is active and used for Masses, baptisms, weddings, and funerals. Because Saint Etheldreda was often invoked for help with infections of the throat, the Blessing of the Throats is held annually at the chapel.

The Catholic chapel at the United States Military Academy, West Point, is modelled on St Etheldreda's.

== History ==
=== 13th century ===
St Etheldreda's was built in the later 13th century, most likely 1284-86, as the town chapel for the Bishops of Ely. It was part of Ely Palace or Ely House, their London residence. The chapel was probably built for John Kirkby, who became Treasurer in 1284 and Bishop of Ely in 1286, before leaving the estate to the monks of Ely on his death in 1290. It is an early London example of Decorated Gothic architecture, related to major work being undertaken at Old St Paul's at that time. Like many private chapels (such as Sainte-Chapelle in Paris and St Stephen's Chapel in Westminster) it has two storeys, with the upper chapel being larger and grander. The upper chapel has early bar tracery in the windows, with an unusual variant of intersecting tracery in the east window. Between the side windows are large arch-and-gable frames for statues, an architectural form with sacred connotations derived from reliquaries.

=== 14th century ===
In 1302, John, Earl of Warenne, swore his loyalty to Edward II in the chapel.

In 1381 John of Gaunt moved to the palace, after the Savoy Palace was destroyed during the Peasants' Revolt.

=== 16th century ===
In 1534, Catholic Masses were outlawed in England. The Bishops of Ely continued to oversee the chapel, which was used for Anglican worship after the English Reformation.

In 1576 a lease on a portion of the house and lands surrounding the chapel was granted by Richard Cox, Bishop of Ely, to Sir Christopher Hatton, a favourite of Elizabeth I. The rent was £10, ten loads of hay and one red rose per year, a small enough sum to give rise to suspicion that Elizabeth had put pressure on the bishop. Hatton borrowed extensively from the crown to pay for refurbishment and upkeep of the property. During his tenancy, the crypt was used as a tavern.

Ely Palace is mentioned in two of Shakespeare's plays, Richard II and Richard III.

=== 17th century ===
In 1620, the upper church was granted to Count Gondomar, the Spanish ambassador, to use as a private chapel, and was considered to be on Spanish soil. Catholic worship, still illegal in England, was allowed in the church. Two years later, during a diplomatic dispute between England and Spain, Gondomar was recalled to Spain and use of the chapel was not given to his successor.

Matthew Wren, Bishop of Ely from 1638 (and uncle of Christopher Wren), worshipped at St Etheldreda's chapel before his imprisonment in 1641.

In 1642, the palace and church was requisitioned by Parliament for use as a prison and hospital during the English Civil War. During Oliver Cromwell's Commonwealth (1649–1660) most of the palace was demolished and the gardens were destroyed.

=== 18th century ===
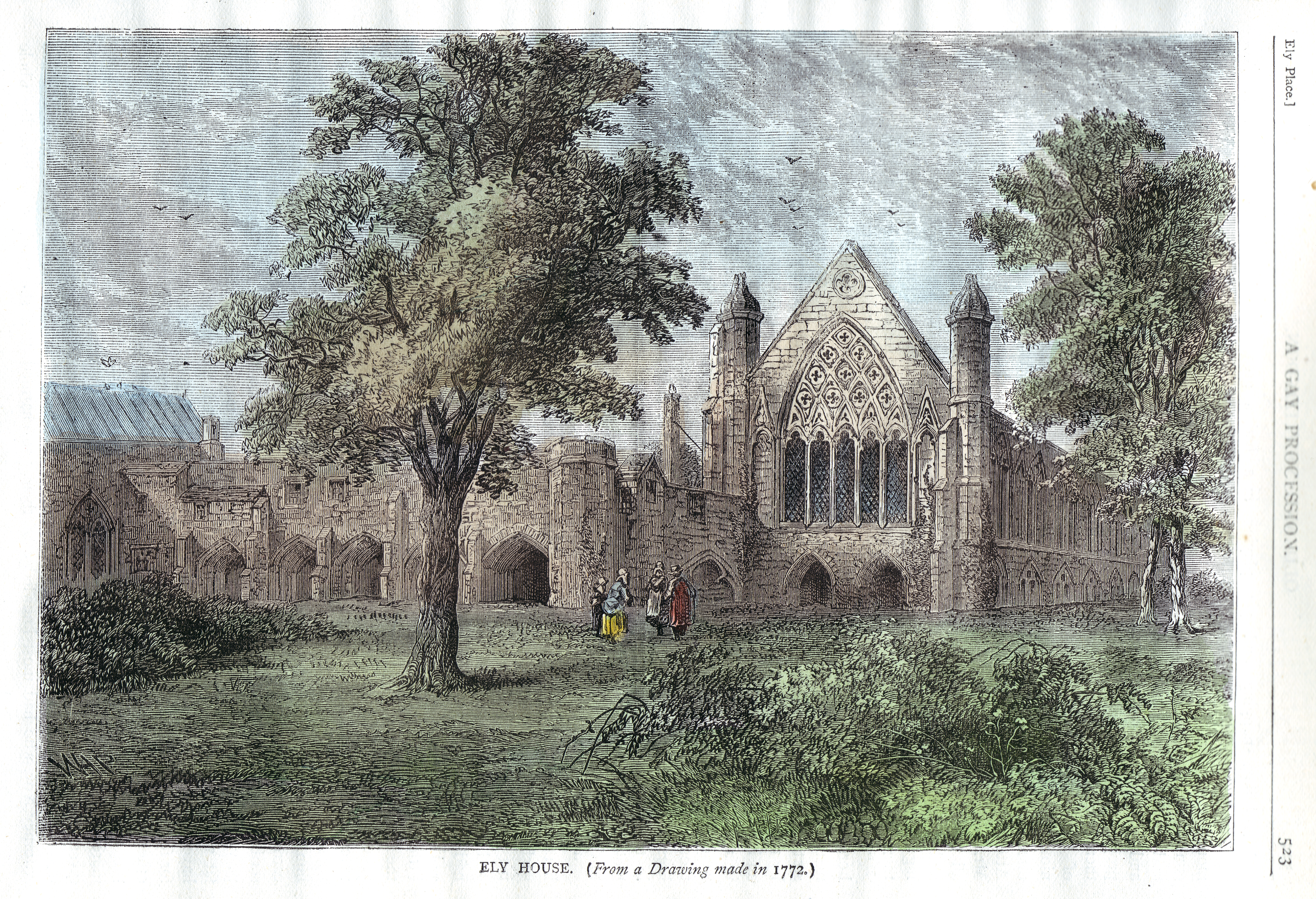
Engraving from a 1772 drawing of Ely House (including St Etheldreda's chapel)

In 1772, the Crown Lands in Fenchurch Street, London Act 1772 allowed the Bishops of Ely to sell the property to the Crown. The site, including the chapel, was sold on to Charles Cole, a surveyor and architect. He demolished all the buildings on the site apart from the chapel and built Ely Place. The chapel was extensively refurbished in the Georgian style before it re-opened in 1786.

=== 19th century ===
"We heard of the proposed sale of Ely Chapel, and sent an agent to bid. We paid £5,400, which was less than the value of the freehold ground on which it stands. The day after we had made the purchase, the clergyman of the Welsh congregation called on me to offer a considerable advance on the sum we had paid. 'Well, sir.' he said when I declined to sell, 'I am sorry we have lost the old place, but I am glad it has passed into your hands, for you will appreciate its beauty, and, I have no doubt, restore it in a way we should never do.'"

— William Lockhart

In 1820 the chapel was taken over by the National Society for the Education of the Poor who hoped to convert the Irish Catholic immigrants then settling in the area. A short time later the church closed.

In 1836, Ely Chapel was reopened by the Reverend Alexander D'Arblay (son of Fanny Burney) as a place of Anglican worship but he died the following year. In 1843, the church was leased by Welsh Anglicans with services celebrated in the Welsh language. The chapel was put up for auction in 1874 and purchased for £5,400 by the Catholic convert Father William Lockhart of the Rosminian order.

Under Lockhart's direction, the crypt and upper church were restored by George Gilbert Scott to their original 13th-century designs. John Francis Bentley designed a choir screen incorporating a confessional, an organ and a choir gallery. The royal coat of arms, added during the reign of Charles I, was removed to the cloister. The church received a relic from the Duke of Norfolk: a piece of Saint Etheldreda's hand, which is kept in a jewel cask to the right of the high altar.

The restoration was completed in 1878 and a Catholic Mass was celebrated in St Ethelreda's for the first time in over 200 years. The upper church was reopened in 1879 on the Feast of Saint Etheldreda (23 June).

For many years, St Etheldreda's church was the oldest Catholic church building in England, but since 1971 it has been surpassed by the 12th-century church of St Leonard & Mary in Malton, North Yorkshire.

=== 20th century ===
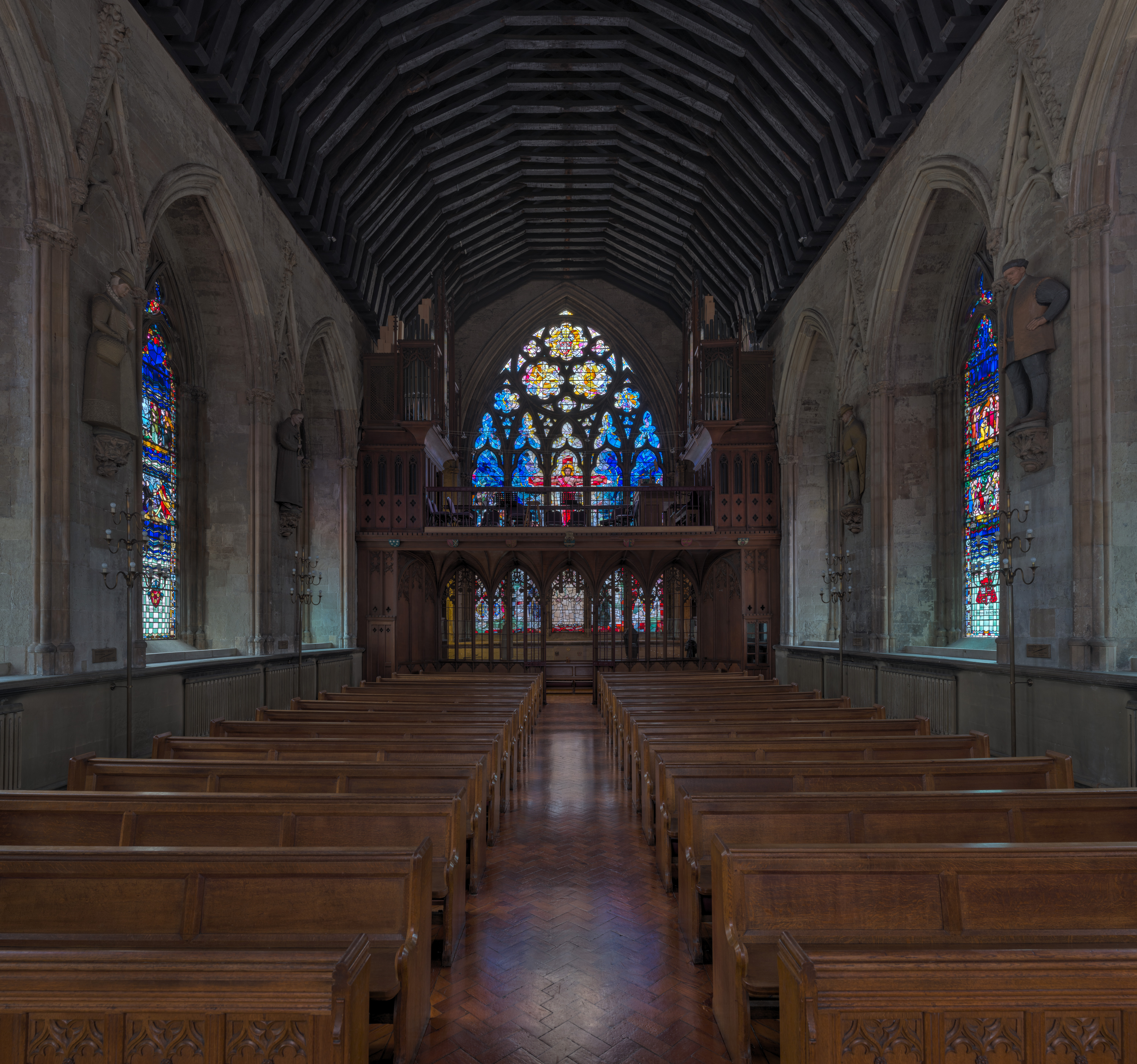
The church as viewed towards the western stained glass window and entrance

In 1925, the Royal Commission on Historical Monuments scheduled the chapel as an ancient monument.

In May 1941, during the Blitz, the church was hit by a bomb that tore a hole in the roof and destroyed the Victorian stained glass windows. It took seven years to repair the structural damage.

In 1952, new stained glass by Joseph Nuttgens was installed in the east window. It features the Trinity, the evangelists Matthew, Mark, Luke, and John, as well as the Virgin Mary and Saints Joseph, Bridget of Kildare and Etheldreda. The stained glass windows in the south wall depict scenes from the Old Testament, and the ones in the north wall show scenes from the New Testament.

In the 1960s, two groups of four statues of English Catholic martyrs from the time of Henry VIII and Elizabeth I were installed along the north and south walls. They include Saint Edmund Gennings, Saint Swithun Wells, Saint Margaret Ward, Blessed John Forest, Blessed Edward Jones, Blessed John Roche, Saint Anne Line, and Saint John Houghton.

=== 21st century ===
In 2011, the Catholic Church proposed that St Anne's Church, Laxton Place, be used as the principal church of the Personal Ordinariate of Our Lady of Walsingham. The journalist Damian Thompson, a prominent supporter of the ordinariate, called for St Etheldreda's to be used by the ordinariate, asserting that the church suffered a decline, both liturgically and as a parish community, in the early years of the 21st century.

Father Kit Cunningham, for some 30 years the rector of St Etheldreda's, was awarded the MBE in 1998. Cunningham returned the MBE before his death in 2010. It was subsequently revealed in June 2011 that Cunningham had sexually abused young boys at a school in Tanzania.

== See also ==
- Embassy chapel
- Sardinian Embassy Chapel
- St James's, Spanish Place
- List of buildings that survived the Great Fire of London
