= Gordon Reece =

British political strategist (1929–2001)

Sir Gordon Reece
- Reece in 1975
- Born: James Gordon Reece; 28 September 1929; Romford, Essex, England
- Died: 22 September 2001 (aged 71); London, England
- Education: Ratcliffe College; Downing College, Cambridge
- Occupations: Journalist, television producer, political/public relations strategist
- Spouse: Elizabeth Johnson (m. 1957; div. 1977)
- Children: 6

Sir James Gordon Reece (28 September 1929 – 22 September 2001) was a British journalist and television producer who worked as a political strategist for Margaret Thatcher during the 1979 general election, which led to her victory over then prime minister James Callaghan. Reece was credited with softening the tone of Thatcher's voice and improving her stuffy dress sense, to broaden her public appeal, and he also encouraged her to adopt and embrace the title of "The Iron Lady" (coined by the USSR) to convey the strength of her unwavering political resolve and unbending character. These were services for which Reece was subsequently knighted. He was to correctly predict that Thatcher would not stand in another general election following her third (1987) landslide victory.

== Early life ==
Reece was born in 1929 in Essex, and raised in Liverpool, the son of James Graham Reece, a motor engineer and businessman, and Beatrice Mary Reece (née Langton), a nurse.

Reece's father was able to send the young Gordon to Ratcliffe College, a Roman Catholic boarding school in Leicestershire; a contemporary was Norman St John-Stevas, later Lord St John of Fawsley, who reported Reece to the school authorities for atheism. He read history at Downing College, Cambridge, and decided on a career in journalism.

== Career ==
Reece worked for a time with the Liverpool Daily Post and then the Sunday Express. In 1960, Reece switched to train as a television producer and went on to work for ITN's News at Ten and produce religious programmes and chat shows.

In the general elections of 1970, February 1974 and October 1974, Reece came into contact with Margaret Thatcher and helped when she launched her successful bid for the party leadership in February 1975. It was his idea that she should be filmed washing dishes, presenting herself as a housewife. By now he had established a cassette-video company, which was taken over by EMI. He took leave from the company to help Thatcher with her television appearances; it was her decision to make him Director of Publicity in February 1978. One of Reece's first moves was to appoint Saatchi & Saatchi Garland Compton as the Conservative Party's advertising agency in 1978. He worked to soften Thatcher's public image, hiring a voice coach used by Laurence Olivier, Kate Fleming. According to the Fleming archive, Thatcher then went on to have lessons from her for the best part of four years, from 1972 to 1976; Fleming died in 1978.

Reece then taught Thatcher to lower and deepen her voice, advised on clothing, accompanied her to her television and radio interviews, and made sure that she avoided combative interviewers who would make her appear strident.

Reece opposed a proposed television debate between Thatcher and Labour Prime Minister James Callaghan in 1979. Callaghan dismissed politicians' interests in television programmes, saying "You have to appeal to ordinary voters, who are not very interested in politics." Thatcher won the 1979 general election.

In 1980 Reece left for Los Angeles, to join Armand Hammer's Occidental Petroleum Corporation as a vice-president. For five years, he did his best to improve Hammer's public image.

During the 1987 election he was appointed Thatcher's adviser for television, but Reece's ability to assist was limited because of his involvement as a PR consultant for Guinness in their take-over battle with Distillers.

Reece continued to act as a troubleshooter for her with the media and colleagues. He was part of her team of advisers when she failed to retain the party leadership in November 1990. Unlike many of her entourage, he reportedly maintained good relations with Thatcher's successor as Prime Minister, John Major.

== Personal life and death ==
In 1957 he married Elizabeth M. Johnson in Manchester. Their marriage was dissolved in 1977. The couple had six children.

In his final years, Reece was diagnosed with tongue cancer; he travelled to the United States for treatment and remained there for a considerable period of time, until returning to the United Kingdom at the end of his life. He died at The London Clinic on 22 September 2001, at the age of 71, six days shy of his birthday.

== Legacy ==
Reece was awarded a knighthood in 1986, having refused appointment as CBE in 1981 on the grounds it was insufficient to his services.

A depiction of Reece in his role in Thatcher's campaign for Conservative Party leadership and her subsequent election as PM is made in the 2012 motion picture The Iron Lady, in which he is portrayed by Roger Allam.
