= Bang Bang (Dubliner) =

Irish eccentric (1906–1981)

Thomas Dudley
- Born: 13 February 1906; Dublin, Ireland
- Died: 11 January 1981 (aged 74); Home for the Blind
- Other name: Bang Bang

Comedy career
- Genre: Street performance

Thomas Dudley (13 February 1906 – 11 January 1981), known by the nickname Bang Bang, was an eccentric elderly gentleman in Dublin in the 1950s and 1960s who achieved fame as a character in the city.

== Early life ==
Dudley was born in the Rotunda Hospital, Dublin, the eldest son of John Dudley, a chimney sweep, and Mary Kane, who lived at 33 Clarence Street. On the 1911 census five year old Thomas Dudley is recorded as living with his parents and a younger sister at 30 Clarence Street North. His father died in 1913, aged 36.

Raised in an orphanage in Cabra, Dublin, he lived most of his adult life on Mill Street, in the Coombe, Dublin.

== Habits ==
A fan of cowboy films, Bang Bang used to travel the buses and trams of the city staging mock shoot-outs with passing people (hence his nickname). He carried a large church key in his pocket which he used as a 'gun'. Dubliners, who enjoyed his good-natured antics, used to participate in his games, sometimes "returning fire" by pretending they had a gun in their hands and shouting "bang bang" back at him, or by falling down "dead" on the city streets when he suddenly appeared at the back of a bus or tram and "shot" them. On occasion Bang Bang even interrupted plays on stage by "shooting" the actors, generally to the amusement of actors and audiences alike. Radio and television presenter, Paddy Crosbie, wrote of 'Bang Bang' in his 1981 book Your Dinner's Poured Out:

Bang! Bang! appeared on our scene in the Twenties, but he belonged to the entire city. His favourite hunting-ground was the trams, from one of which he jumped, turning immediately to fire 'Bang Bang' at the conductor. Passengers and passers-by took up the game, and soon an entire street of grown-ups were shooting at each other from doorways and from behind lamp-posts. The magic of make-believe childhood took over, and it was all due to the simple innocence of 'Bang Bang'. He was a very young man at this time. "Bang! You’re shot. If yeh don’t die, I’m not playin'." My father was very fond of him, and seemed to come across him very often in different parts of the city. He told us about one incident with 'Bang Bang' in Marlboro' Street, where the shooting pretence went on for nearly half-an-hour and some visiting Americans joined in. They thought the whole thing was hilarious.

== Death ==
In later life he was taken in and cared for by the Rosminian Fathers in Drumcondra. He died in their care on 11 January 1981 and was buried in their cemetery. and is widely remembered by some of the older Dubliners. His death was recorded by the Irish Independent on 12 January 1981, a notice which Paddy Crosbie also details in his book.

One of Dublin’s best known and most beloved characters Tommy 'Bang Bang' Dudley has died in a home for the blind. He was 75. He was an institution in Dublin during his lifetime. He carried a huge jail key with him around the city, mockingly pointing it at strangers and shouting 'Bang Bang. Despite progressive eye disease, ‘Bang Bang’ maintained his daily beat in the city frequently causing mayhem by jumping onto buses, slapping his rear end as if he was on a horse. Only recently he told his friends on his sickbed in Clonturk House for the Adult Blind in Drumcondra, Dublin, that he got the idea for his 'Bang Bang' characterisations from the many cowboy films that he had attended in his early years. He lived in various parts of the city during his lifetime – in Mill Lane for 41 years and later in Bridgefoot Street flats.' Full funeral arrangements will be made today.

Bang Bang was buried in an unmarked grave in St Joseph's Cemetery, Drumcondra. In 2017, 36 years after his death, a headstone was erected after a fundraising campaign by a local café named Bang Bang.

== Legacy ==
Bang Bang has entered the folklore of Dublin as an eccentric but harmless individual who amused the city's citizens with his games. He still is mentioned in books and broadcast programmes. In the 1970s the Abbey Theatre performed a play about the history of Dublin entitled From the Vikings to Bang Bang.

His key is on display in the reading room of the Dublin City Archive, Pearse Street

He is mentioned in the lyrics of a children's skipping song "We All Went Up to the Mero" published by Pete St. John. One verse reads:

"And we all went up to the Mero, hey there, who's your man
It's only Johnny Forty Coats, sure he's desperate man
Bang Bang shoots the buses with his golden key
Hey hi diddley I and out goes she"

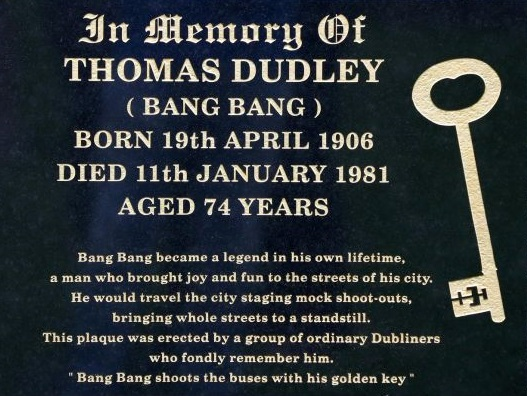
Plaque erected to Bang Bang at St Joseph’s Rosmininians, Drumcondra

A new comic song "Bang Bang" written by Tony McGaley was performed as part of The Wild Bees Nest Project in conjunction with the 2011 Bealtaine Festival. The song was performed on stage at the National Library of Ireland, Kildare Street, Dublin, on the last two days of May 2011 by Tony McGaley with the other Wild Bees Nest singers.

Bang Bang was part of the inspiration for the Shadowbox Theatre Company's Play Looking for Bang-Bang set in Dublin following the path of three children in Dublin searching out famous characters at the time.

In 28 August 2017, a plaque was unveiled by the Lord Mayor of Dublin, Mícheál Mac Donncha, on the site of Bang Bang's unmarked grave.

The band Fontaines D.C. (Dublin City) released their debut single "Liberty Belle" in August 2018, featuring Thomas on the sleeve for the 7" vinyl release. The band's singer, Grian Chatten has said that "Liberty Belle" “is a lament to the death of old Dublin, written by people who couldn’t afford the new one.”

In 2017 the Dublin playwright Dermot Bolger created a one-man stage play, Bang Bang based on the life of Thomas Dudley, which premiered at Bewley’s Café Theatre, directed by Mark O’Brien and starring Pat McGrath as Bang Bang. The text was later included in Bolger’s book, Bang Bang & Other Dublin Monologues, published by New Island Books, ISBN 978-1-84840-658-2
