= St Joseph's Industrial School, Clonmel =

St Joseph's Industrial School, generally referred to as Ferryhouse, is located four kilometres east of Clonmel, in County Tipperary, Ireland. The original building was erected in 1884 by Count Arthur Moore, a wealthy local Catholic as a reformatory for boys. Shortly after its construction, Moore invited the Rosminians to run the school.

== History ==
Arthur John Moore was an enthusiastic supporter of the new Industrial Schools as an alternative to the detention of children in Workhouses. However, his motives for establishing Ferryhouse may not have been entirely altruistic. At this time he was running for Parliament and the building of the school, which had widespread popular support, was completed just in time for the 1880 General election. Moore was successfully returned to Westminster for the Home Rule Party.

In January 1885, a Certificate was granted by the State for the school to receive 150 boys and in 1944 this Certificate was increased to 200. The numbers in Ferryhouse ranged from 189 boys in 1940, increasing to a high of 205 in 1960. This number decreased to 160 in 1970. There were between 150 and 200 boys in Ferryhouse until the 1970s. Thereafter, the numbers began to gradually decline but until the 1980s, the numbers were far in excess of the certified number.

== Scandal ==
Like many residential institutions in the country, in 2009, following publication of the Ryan report, Ferryhouse was finally recognised as a place of systematic physical and sexual abuse of children carried on over a period of many years. Michael O'Brien, a survivor of abuse and a former pupil of the school, spoke on Questions and Answers of how he suffered horrendous physical and sexual abuse at the hands of the Rosminians, and how it affected him to this day.

== See also ==
- Industrial school
- St. Patrick's Industrial School, Upton
- Artane Industrial school
- St Joseph's Industrial School, Letterfrack
- Magdalen Asylum
- Clonmel Borstal

== Sources ==
- St Joseph’s Industrial School, (‘Ferryhouse’), 1885–1999 extract from Ryan Report resulting from Laffoy Commission.
- St. Joseph's, Ferryhouse - Official site
- Mary Raftery; Eoin O'Sullivan (1999). Suffer the little children. New Island Books. ISBN 978-1-874597-83-4.
- Task force on child care services: final report to the Minister for Health Dept. of Health, Ireland, Stationery Office, 1980.
- Barry, Albert (1905). The life of Count Moore. Dublin: M. H. Gill.
