= Michael O'Brien (Fianna Fáil politician) =

Irish politician (1933–2025)

Michael O'Brien (27 September 1933 – 22 April 2025) was an Irish politician who was a councillor and mayor of Clonmel. He was also a survivor of abuse at Ferryhouse and came to national prominence through his campaigning on this subject.

== Early life ==
Born in Clonmel on 27 September 1933, O'Brien was one of 13 siblings. When he was eight years old, his mother died and he and his siblings were taken into care. He was detained in this industrial school for eight years where he was raped and beaten repeatedly. He was separated from his brother Thomas Joseph O’Brien for 40 years.

== Political career ==
O'Brien joined Fianna Fáil at the age of 18. He was elected to Clonmel borough council, being elected mayor of Clonmel in 1993. He lost his seat at the 1999 local elections.

== Advocacy ==
O'Brien became a campaigner for the rights of those who had been put in industrial schools in 1999 when he went public with his own experiences, founding the lobby group Right to Peace.

Following his death, Irish President Michael D. Higgins paid tribute to O'Brien saying his "sense of citizenship and courageous personal testimony was such a powerful act of public service".

=== Appearance on Questions and Answers ===
O'Brien was in the audience for Questions and Answers on 25 May 2009 when he confronted Minister for Transport Noel Dempsey about the way the Commission to Inquire into Child Abuse had treated survivors of the industrial schools, pointing out that the allegedly non-adversarial process had involved him being accused of lying. He said the government should change the constitution so that the assets of the religious orders who ran the industrial schools could be frozen. He also spoke of how he still suffered nightmares about the abuse he suffered in Ferryhouse and how his experience of the questioning had led him to contemplate suicide but his wife had persuaded him not to do it.

He had been detained in St Joseph's Industrial School, Clonmel.

The audience applauded him for speaking out. The presenter John Bowman said that Michael O'Brien's speech was the most memorable moment in 23 years of the show.

== Personal life and death ==
While O'Brien was a Catholic, he rarely went to church.

O'Brien died in Clonmel on 22 April 2025, at the age of 91, his wife having died before him.
