= William Seth Agar =

William Seth Agar (25 December 1815 – 23 August 1872) was an English Catholic canon.

== Life ==
Agar was born in York. His father, grandfather and great-grandfather were all also called William Seth Agar, and were of the Agar family of Stockton-on-the-Forest. Three members of this family, all called Thomas Agar, were Lord Mayors of York, in 1618, 1724 and 1744.

He was educated at Prior Park College, Bath, and was ordained priest there, and appointed in 1845 to Lyme Regis, Dorset. Ill health obliged him to leave Lyme twice, and in 1852 he was appointed chaplain to the canonesses of St. Augustine at Abbotsleigh, where he lived uninterruptedly to his death. In 1856 he was installed as Canon of the Plymouth Chapter.

He is considered by Roman Catholics to have been "one of the most deeply versed priests in England in ascetical and mystical theology, and in the operations of grace in souls".

He was more a profound thinker than a great reader, although he studied many theological and philosophical works, especially the published writings of his favorite author, Antonio Rosmini-Serbati, which he carefully annotated. Agar also translated Rosmini's Catholic Catechism into English.
