= Kit Cunningham =

British priest (1931–2010)

Christopher Basil Cunningham IC, MBE (Note: Cunningham returned his MBE insignia to Buckingham Palace shortly before his death but was not formally removed from membership of the Order of the British Empire.) (18 November 1931 – 12 December 2010) was an English Catholic priest.

For almost 30 years, as the rector of St Etheldreda's Church, Ely Place, Cunningham was one of London's best-known Catholic parish priests. His death, in 2010, was widely reported in the media. In 2011 it became publicly known that he had been involved in sexual abuse at a school in Tanzania in the 1960s.

Cunningham was educated at Ratcliffe College and entered the Rosminian religious order.

== Tanzania and sexual abuse of young boys ==
During the 1960s, Cunningham was stationed at St Michael's Catholic Boarding School in Soni, Tanzania. While there he and other Rosminian priests perpetrated sexual abuse against young boys that made this school, according to one pupil, "a loveless, violent and sad hellhole". Other pupils recall being photographed naked, hauled out of bed at night to have their genitals fondled and other sexual abuse. Cunningham in at least one case "forced a boy to perform a sex act on him."

Although Cunningham's abuse was known about by the Rosminian order before his death in 2010, it was covered up and knowledge of it only emerged publicly in 2011 in the BBC documentary Abused: Breaking the silence. The order resisted paying compensation to the abuse victims.

The Rosminian order has subsequently apologised for the abuse and the order's subsequent cover up. Moreover, their audited financial statements for the year ending 5 April 2015 report under the heading "Legal and safeguarding related costs" that "Last year’s report referred to legal claims which had been brought against the Charity concerning the welfare of children between approximately 1940 and 1985. A settlement has now been reached about these claims." The Charity was also liable for the claimants' legal fees. The matter has had a significant impact on the Charity's finances, with payment of their legal and settlement costs amounting to a total of GBP 1,746,523 for the year.

== Views on marriage ==
Cunningham had liberal views on marriage. He made St Etheldreda's a popular place for weddings – partly because of its historic beauty, but also because his relaxed approach to marriage preparation, devoid of any embarrassing discussions about the couple's current domestic arrangements; he was willing to bless the second marriages of divorcees, against Church teaching. For the last 30 years of his life, Cunningham had a female companion, Jenny Floyd, until her death in 2006.

== Mission to journalists ==
Cunningham had a particular mission to journalists. As Fleet Street is only 10 minutes' walk from St Etheldreda's, journalists could attend midday Masses and even have time for a drink in Ye Olde Mitre, a pub next door. Masses were said in honour of The Keys, the Catholic writers' guild. On these occasions Mass was followed by supper with a generous supply of alcohol, before the guild's prayer of St Francis de Sales (the patron saint of journalists) was said. There were, however, feuds. Cunningham was said to have remarked of one newspaper executive: "The only way I’m allowing him back here is if he comes crawling into the confession box."

== MBE ==
Cunningham was appointed a member of the Order of the British Empire (MBE) by Queen Elizabeth II, advised by the Prime Minister, Tony Blair, in the 1998 New Year Honours. Following correspondence with some of his sexual abuse victims, shortly before Cunningham's death, the insignia of this honour was returned to the Queen. Some accounts allege that it was returned by Cunningham himself to Buckingham Palace, others that it was returned by mail on his behalf to St James's Palace by the Revd Fr David Myers, Provincial Superior of the Rosminians in the United Kingdom, following Cunningham's admission of guilt. Myers himself states that Cunningham returned the insignia himself. Despite returning the insignia, Cunningham remained a member of the order until his death. Honours are bestowed by the monarchs and can be revoked only by them; they cannot formally be renounced. Honours are only revoked when the Forfeiture Committee submits a recommendation to the monarch through the prime minister. The monarch directs that the appointment be cancelled and annulled and that the person's name be erased from the register of the order and a notice is published in the London Gazette. Honours are normally forfeited when a person is convicted of a criminal offence and sentenced to imprisonment for more than three months or is found guilty by a professional or regulatory body. Cunningham was never convicted of a criminal offence despite his admission of guilt.

== Documentary ==
Details of Cunningham's sexual abuse were featured in a BBC documentary, Abused: Breaking the Silence, which was broadcast on 21 June 2011. The programme also featured interviews with several of his victims. The abuse was not mentioned in the obituaries published following his death.
