= Michael Shipster =

British diplomat

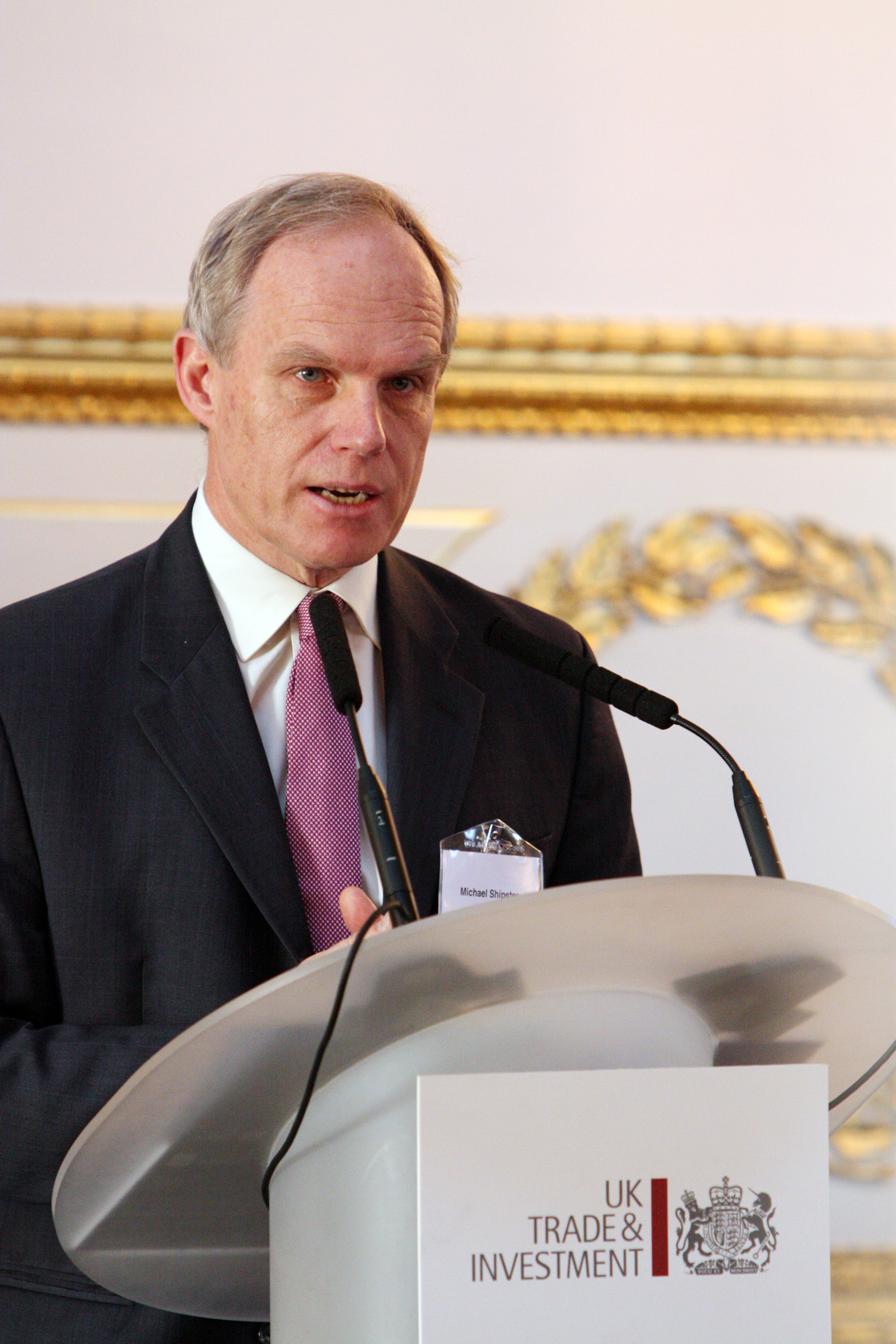
- Shipster in 2011
- Born: 17 March 1951 (age 75)
- Education: St Edmund Hall, Oxford; University of East Anglia
- Occupation: Diplomat
- Awards: CMG; OBE
- Espionage activity
- Allegiance: United Kingdom

Michael David Shipster CMG OBE (born 17 March 1951) is a former British diplomat.

He was educated at Ratcliffe College, St Edmund Hall, Oxford (MA 1972) and the University of East Anglia (MA, Development Studies, 1977). He was an Overseas Development Institute Nuffield Fellow in Botswana between 1972 and 1974, and joined Her Majesty's Diplomatic Service in 1977, serving in Moscow, New Delhi, Lusaka, Johannesburg and Washington. He was awarded an OBE in 1990 and a CMG in 2003.

His wife Jackie was an actor, pianist and music teacher.

== Iraq intelligence ==
In The Way of the World, journalist and author Ron Suskind claims that Shipster was the head of MI6 in the Middle East prior to the Iraq War, and that he had held secret meetings in Jordan with Tahir Jalil Habbush, head of Iraqi Intelligence. Suskind claims that Habbush assured Shipster that Iraq did not possess active nuclear, chemical, biological or other weapons of mass destruction, and that the then head of MI6, Sir Richard Dearlove, flew to Washington to brief the head of the CIA, George Tenet, about this, and that Tenet immediately briefed George Bush.
