= Joseph Lauwerys =

Belgian educationalist

Joseph Albert Lauwerys (1902–1981) was a prominent educationalist who played an important role in the foundation of UNESCO.

Joseph Lauwerys was born in Brussels, Belgium on 7 November 1902 and came to England in 1914 where he remained for the rest of his life. He attended Ratcliffe College, Leicestershire, and after a period of school in Bournemouth he worked as a shop assistant. However, from his involvement in the co-operative movement, he decided to attend evening classes, studying in chemistry and physics at King's College London. He went on to become a secondary school teacher including an appointment at Christ's Hospital School. In 1932 he started lecturing in scientific method at the Institute of Education, University of London, becoming reader in Education in 1941, and Professor of Comparative Education in 1947.He held this position until 1970 when he took charge of the Atlantic Institute, Nova Scotia.

In the period 1945-1947, he was particularly prominent in the establishment of UNESCO alongside a number of other international educational initiatives, including the World Education Fellowship. For many years he edited of The World Year Book of Education. He was an advocate of Basic English.

== Collections ==
Lauwerys' archive is held at the Institute of Education, University College London. The collection contains extensive personal and working papers, correspondence, and research about educational conditions across the world.

The Institute of Education also holds Lauwerys' collection of books, printed material, and pamphlets. The collection spans many subjects across the education field in the 20th century including theory, systems, practice, and morality.
