= Martine Warmann =

Personal information
- Full name: Martine (George) Warmann
- Born: 4 October 1983 (age 43) Leicester, UK
- Education: Ratcliffe College
- Years active: 2013-today
- Height: 160 cm (5 ft 3 in)
- Weight: 56 kg (123 lb)
- Other interests: HIIT; Kettlebells; Calisthenics

Sport
- Country: United Kingdom
- Sport: Powerlifting
- Weight class: Women's Open 56 kg
- Coached by: Tony Ward (Leicester); Delroy McQueen
Medal record
European Powerlifting 2014 - Prague
Gold medal – first place	Women’s Open	56kg Weight Class
British Powerlifting 2013 - UK
Gold medal – first place	Women’s Open	56kg Weight Class
Powerlifting World Championships 2013 – Czech Republic
Bronze medal – third place	Women’s Open	56kg Weight Class

Martine Warmann (born Martine George, 4 October 1983) is an English powerlifter who competes in the Women's Open 56 kg Weight Class. Martine has competed for the British Powerlifting Union (BPU), Global Powerlifting Committee (GPC), Great Britain Powerlifting Federation (GBPF), and the World Powerlifting Congress (WPC) selected for Team GB and is a British and European Powerlifting Champion.

== Biography ==
Warmann was born in Leicester, England on 4 October 1983. She was privately educated and studied performing arts at Dupont Dance School. In 2001, she appeared in her first music video, 2002 performed alongside Trevor Nelson and shortly after moving to London in 2004, backing danced behind Jason Donavon in 2005. She then completed her teacher training at the National Dance Academy in London and went on to compete in beauty pageants placing as a finalist in Miss Derby 2005, Miss Galaxay 2005 and placing in the top 7 at Miss Great Britain 2006. In 2008, she wrote and published her first book 'The Performers Guide to Success" with Trafford Publishing. Martine Warmann continued with a dance and modeling career until moving back to Leicester to pursue a career in health & fitness in 2010 and is now a co-owner of Be-Fitter Gym in Leicester.

Warmann who also competes with the UKBFF in the Bikini Athlete category has starred on the ITV show Ninja Warrior UK.
