= St Anne's Roman Catholic Church, Laxton Place =

Demolished Catholic church in London

Coordinates: 51°31′33″N 0°8′31″W

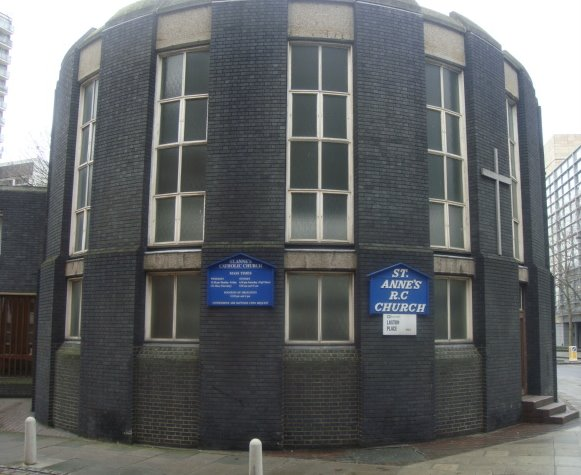
St Anne's in 2009

St Anne's was a Catholic church in Laxton Place near Regent's Park in London. The church was constructed in 1970 but fell into disuse at the turn of the 21st century and was demolished in 2019 to make way for flats.

== History ==
There had been a school chapel in Little Albany Street since 1857, replaced in 1938 by a new church in Seaton Place. The redevelopment of the area in the 1960s included provision for a new church on the corner of Laxton Place and Longford Street. Cardinal Heenan laid the foundation stone on 30 May 1970 and the church opened later that year.

The UK's small Chaldean Catholic community started worshipping in the church in 1991 under the Right Rev Andreas Abouna. Worship continued until at least 2003, but the church had closed by 2011.

In 2011, the Roman Catholic Church proposed that St Anne's be used as the principal church of the Personal Ordinariate of Our Lady of Walsingham for former Anglicans. Damian Thompson, the religious affairs commentator for The Daily Telegraph and a prominent supporter of the ordinariate, rejected this proposal and described St Anne's as a "cross between a public lavatory and a Christian Science Reading Room". Thompson preferred that St Etheldreda's Church in Ely Place, the only medieval Roman Catholic church in London, be used by the ordinariate.

== Architecture ==
The church was designed by Scott and Jaques. It had curving walls of dark brick, broken up by 17 tall windows. Trusses of prestressed concrete supported a copper roof. The altar was stone, and the rest of the furnishings were wooden.

== See also ==
- Regent's Park Estate – council estate to the north
- Regent's Place – new development on other side of Longford St
