= Carlo Rosmini =

Italian historian

Carlo Rosmini (29 October 1758 – 9 June 1827) was an Italian historian, mainly of biographies.

He was born to a noble and wealthy family of Roveredo. His brother was a prominent Catholic theologian Antonio Rosmini (Rosmini-Serbate). In Roveredo, he was close to members of the scholarly Vannetti family, including Clementino. He studied at the Collegium Nobilum of Insbruck. By 1783, with Vanetti, using pseudonyms, he had published a pamphlet of secular verses. This was followed by further essays, including biographies of Ovid (1789) and Seneca (1796). Further essays and biographies of Vittorino da Feltre and Giovanni Battista Guarino followed. After the incorporation of Roveredo into the Napoleonic kingdom of Italy, he moved to Milan. In Milan he wrote biographies of Francesco Filelfo (1808) and Gian Giacomo Trivulzio (1815). In 1820, he published the start of a History of Milan (Dell'Istoria di Milano); this project would occupy him for the next few decades.
