= Grace Dieu Manor School =

Grace Dieu Manor School & Nursery
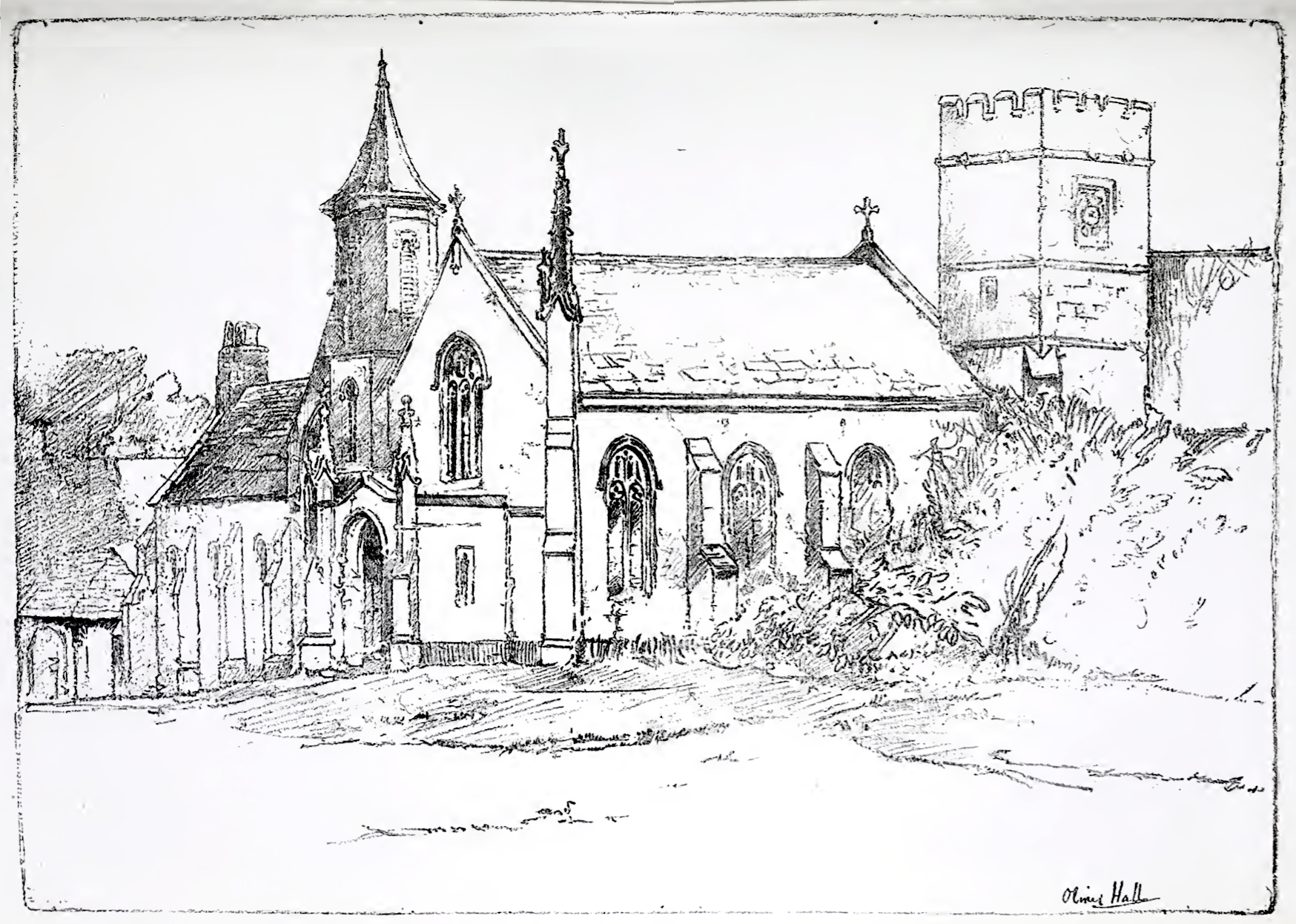
- Grace Dieu Manor House chapel c.1898

Location
- Grace Dieu; Thringstone; Coalville, Leicestershire, LE67 5UG; England; 52.75708°N 1.35293°W

Information
- Type: private
- Religious affiliation: Roman Catholic
- Established: 1933
- Local authority: Leicestershire
- Department for Education URN: 120318 Tables
- Headmaster: Margaret Kewell
- Gender: Coeducational
- Age: 12 weeks to 11
- Website: www.gracedieu.com

Grace Dieu Manor School was a private Catholic preparatory school at Grace-Dieu, near Thringstone in Leicestershire, England. It was founded in May 1933 by the Rosminians as a prep school for Ratcliffe College, and occupied the 19th-century Grace Dieu Manor, which has about 120 acres (50 hectares) of grounds. The school closed in July 2020 and the site placed on the market.

== Sexual abuse scandal ==
Victims of sexual abuse by former staff at the school are suing the Rosminian order, the owners of the school. The abuse was catalogued in the 2011 BBC documentary Abused: Breaking the Silence. The eleven men's claims span a period from 1952 to 1973, but many others have yet to be looked into and involve sadistic physical, sexual and emotional abuse including regular beating.

A former principal, Charles Foulds, has said that the incidents "have no relevance to the school of today" but also that "everyone here is very distressed that any child suffered in this place over half a century ago."
