= Ratcliffe College =

Public school in Leicestershire, England

Location
- Leicester, Leicestershire, LE7 4SG; England
- 52°43′46″N 1°04′33″W

Information
- Type: Public school Private day and boarding
- Motto: Legis Plenitudo Charitas (Charity is the fulfilment of the law)
- Religious affiliation: Roman Catholic (Rosminians)
- Established: 1845; 181 years ago
- Founder: Blessed Father Antonio Rosmini-Serbati
- Department for Education URN: 120316 Tables
- Headmaster: Jonathan Reddin
- Gender: Coeducational
- Age: 3 to 18
- Enrolment: 920
- Colour: navy blue
- Publication: The Ratcliffian
- Former pupils: Old Ratcliffians
- Website: http://www.ratcliffecollege.com/

Ratcliffe College is a coeducational Catholic private boarding and day school near the village of Ratcliffe on the Wreake, Leicestershire, approximately 7 miles (11 km) from Leicester, England. The college, situated in 200 acres of parkland on the Fosse Way about 6 miles (10 km) north of Leicester, was founded on the instructions of Blessed Father Antonio Rosmini-Serbati in 1847 as a seminary. The college became coeducational under the presidency of Father Tony Baxter in the late 1970s. As of the 2023–2024 academic year, there were 920 students on roll at Ratcliffe, from ages 3 to 18.

== History ==
Ratcliffe College was founded in 1844 on the instructions of Blessed Father Antonio Rosmini-Serbati, founder of the Institute of Charity, as a noviciate for his newly founded (1828) Congregation. Three years later, in 1847, the noviciate was moved and the building was used as a boarding school for middle-class Roman Catholic boys. The first two pupils arrived in June 1847.

The school is operated by Rosmini's Institute of Charity. Until 1996, the school's senior leader used the title "Father President", a position held by a priest of the Institute. In 1996, Tim Kilbride became the first lay headmaster and in due course the non-executive title of Father President was restored to the senior Rosminian priest working in the college. Peter Farrar succeeded Kilbride in 2000, followed by Gareth Lloyd in 2009 and Jonathan Reddin in January 2017.

Ratcliffe College became coeducational in the late 1970s during the presidency of Father Tony Baxter. As of the 2023–2024 academic year, the school had 920 pupils aged between 3 and 18. The college also maintains a partnership with the Leicester City Football Club Academy Programme, with academy players studying and boarding at the school during Years 10 and 11.

== Buildings and architecture ==
The original school buildings were designed by the Victorian Gothic Revivalist Augustus Welby Pugin. Pugin, who is associated with Catholic architecture throughout the Midlands and north of England, is also noted for his collaboration with Charles Barry in the reconstruction of the Palace of Westminster. The Square was designed by Charles Francis Hansom, brother of Joseph Hansom, the designer of the Hansom cab. Various building works over the years have contributed to Pugin and Hansom's work, and modern buildings include a "new" Gothic refectory, constructed in 1912–1913, and a Byzantine-style school chapel in the early 1960s.

== Site ==
Ratcliffe College is situated near the village of Ratcliffe on the Wreake, Leicestershire, approximately 7 miles (11 km) north of Leicester, England. The campus occupies around 200 acres (0.81 km^{2}) of parkland along the Roman Fosse Way.

== Management ==
Ratcliffe College, the front

=== Former Presidents and Headmasters ===
- Father Peter Hutton IC 1851 – 1880

=== Independent Schools Inspectorate (ISI) ===
Ratcliffe College is regularly inspected by the Independent Schools Inspectorate (ISI). This is the body approved by the Department of Education for the purpose of inspecting schools belonging to the Independent Schools Council (ISC) Associations and reporting on compliance with independent school regulations.

The school received an excellent report in all areas during the latest ISI Inspection, 2022 – Focused Compliance and Educational Quality Inspection. The Educational Quality Inspection reports on the quality of the College’s work. It focuses on two key outcomes:

1. The achievement of the students, including their academic development. 2. The personal development of the students.

The College was judged “Excellent” for both outcomes, the highest grade possible.

== Cricket ground ==
The college cricket ground is used by the college cricket team. The first recorded use of the ground came in 1948, when Ratcliffe College played King Edward's School, Birmingham. The ground has also played host to a single List-A match, when the Leicestershire Cricket Board played Denmark in the 1st round of the 2003 Cheltenham and Gloucester Trophy which was played in 2002.

School Combined Cadet Force in the Square (now known as the Lockhart Garden).

== Notable former pupils ==
Former pupils of Ratcliffe are known as Old Ratcliffians. They include:

- Terence Alexander, film and television actor, singer
- John Arnold, bishop
- Fin Back, professional footballer
- Ian Bannen, Scottish actor and Oscar nominee for Best Supporting Actor (1965)
- Shaun Brogan, SAS officer decorated for Dhofar campaign
- Sir Peter Caruana, former Chief Minister of Gibraltar
- Douglas Chamberlain, cardiologist who transformed clinical care
- Kit Cunningham, disgraced British priest
- Louis Deacon, England and Tigers rugby player
- Willie Doyle, Irish Jesuit Priest (killed in action during World War I)
- Sir Patrick Robin Fearn, diplomat, British ambassador to Cuba and Spain
- Gerald Garcia, classical guitarist and composer
- James Gillick, portrait and figurative artist
- François Grosjean, psycholinguist and researcher on bilingualism
- Michael Louis Hearn, Irish Nationalist MP for Dublin South
- Peter Hildreth, British hurdling athlete
- David Jolliffe, Director-General of British Army Medical Services
- Tim Knox, art historian, Director of the Royal Collection and former Director of Fitzwilliam Museum, Cambridge
- Joseph Lauwerys, prominent educationalist who helped to found UNESCO
- Patrick McGoohan, American-born actor of Irish parentage who rose to fame in the British film and TV industry: starring in the 1960s television series Danger Man and cult classic The Prisoner
- Jon Moynihan, Lord Moynihan of Chelsea, businessman, venture capitalist and life peer
- Kevin Myers, Irish journalist and writer
- Patrick Nuttgens, architect
- Sir Gordon Reece, former advisor to Margaret Thatcher
- Kevin Shinkwin, Lord Shinkwin of Balham, Conservative politician and life peer
- Michael Shipster, diplomat
- Lord St John of Fawsley, former Conservative minister under Margaret Thatcher
- Sir Henry Joseph Twynham, British administrator in India, Governor of Central Provinces
- Richard Wallace, former editor of the Daily Mirror
- Tim Wilson, finalist of The Circle
- Luke Wright, Sussex CCC, and England cricketer
- Martine Warmann, powerlifter

== Bibliography ==
- Ratcliffe College 1847–1947 edited by Rev. C. R. Leetham with an Appendix at the back entitled 'Alphabetical List of Students 1847–1950'

== Coat of arms ==
Coat of arms of Ratcliffe College
Notes Granted 23 September 1936. Crest On a wreath Argent and Azure, A pelican in her piety affronte argent, vulning herself proper, the nest Or. Escutcheon Azure, six mullets, three, two and one, argent; on a chief Or three pellets, the centre one charged with a lion rampant of the third, the dexter with a lily and the sinister with a swallow both of the second. Motto 'Legis Plenitudo Charitas'
