= John Roche (martyr) =

Irish Roman Catholic martyr

Blessed John Roche
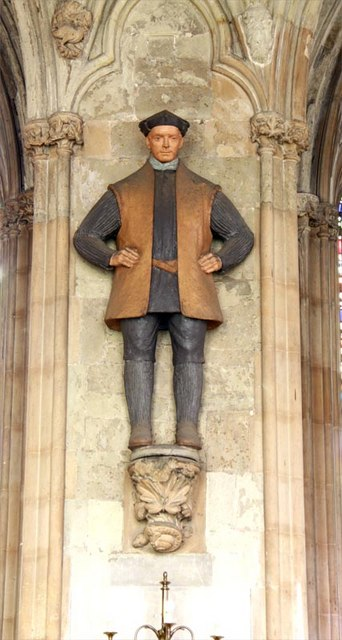
- Statue of John Roche in the church of St Etheldreda, Ely Place, London

Martyr
- Born: Ireland
- Died: 30 August 1588; Tyburn, London
- Venerated in: Roman Catholic Church
- Beatified: 15 December 1929 by Pope Pius XI
- Feast: 30 August
- Patronage: sailors, mariners, boatmen

John Roche (also known as John Neele or Neale) was a Catholic martyr, born in Ireland, who died in London, England on 30 August 1588.

== Life ==
He helped Margaret Ward arrange the escape of Richard Watson from Bridewell Prison when the boatman she had originally asked to help her refused to do so. Roche exchanged clothes with the prisoner and was arrested in his place. Offered his freedom if he would ask Queen Elizabeth I's pardon and promise to attend a Protestant church, he refused, and was hanged at Tyburn, London on 30 August 1588, along with Ward, Edward Shelley, Richard Martin, and Richard Leigh and Richard Lloyd (alias Flower).

== Veneration ==
Pope Pius XI beatified Roche in 1929. A school in the London Borough of Tower Hamlets was named after him.

=== Iconography ===
Usually shown in working-class Elizabethan dress and holding an oar or a miniature boat, he is the patron of sailors, mariners and boatmen.

== Sources ==
- Patron Saints Index: Blessed John Roche
