= Aloysius Gentili =

Italian Rosminian cleric

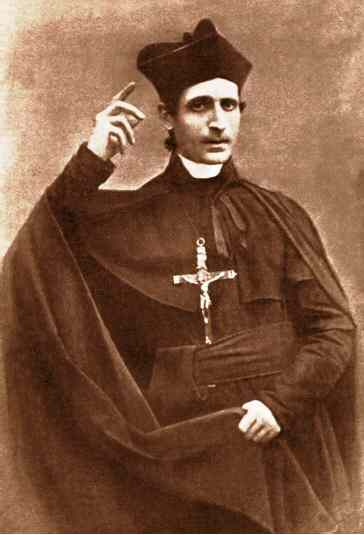
Early photographic portrait of Aloysius Gentili

Aloysius Luigi Gentili (14 July 1801 Rome – 26 September 1848 Dublin) was an Italian Rosminian cleric.

== Biography ==
Gentili's early life was that of a brilliant young man of the world. He sought admission into the Society of Jesus but was refused because of his health. He made the acquaintance of Antonio Rosmini-Serbati, who accepted him as a postulant of the newly founded Institute of Charity. He remained in Rome, attending theological lectures whilst residing at the Irish College in order to improve his English, and after his ordination to the priesthood, in 1830, proceeded to Domodossola to make his novitiate.

Whilst Gentili was living at the Irish College, Ambrose Phillips de Lisle, a young English gentleman who had been converted to Roman Catholicism while a student at Cambridge, arrived in Rome. This zealous convert applied to the rector of the Irish College to obtain a priest to preach the Catholic Faith in the neighbourhood of his ancestral home. The rector suggested the Abate Gentili as in every way suited to the purpose. This led to a great friendship between the young priest and de Lisle, the submission of the whole project to Rosmini, and eventually to the coming of Gentili and other fathers to England in 1835. It was not merely the invitation of de Lisle that brought the Rosminians to England. In the meantime, a Vicar Apostolic Peter Augustine Baines sought to obtain the services of the fathers for his Prior Park College. Though Rosmini gave his consent as early as 1831, the little band did not sail from Civitavecchia till 22 May 1835. Pope Gregory XVI came on board the vessel and blessed the three as "Italian missioners" before they sailed.

Gentili and his companions arrived in London on 15 June. A few days later Gentili preached his first sermon in England, at Trelawney House, in Cornwall, whither they had been invited by Sir Henry Trelawney, a convert. He took for his text, "Thou art Peter, and upon this rock I will build my church". Soon after, the missionaries were settled at Prior Park, where early in the following year (1836) Gentili gave a retreat to the whole college.

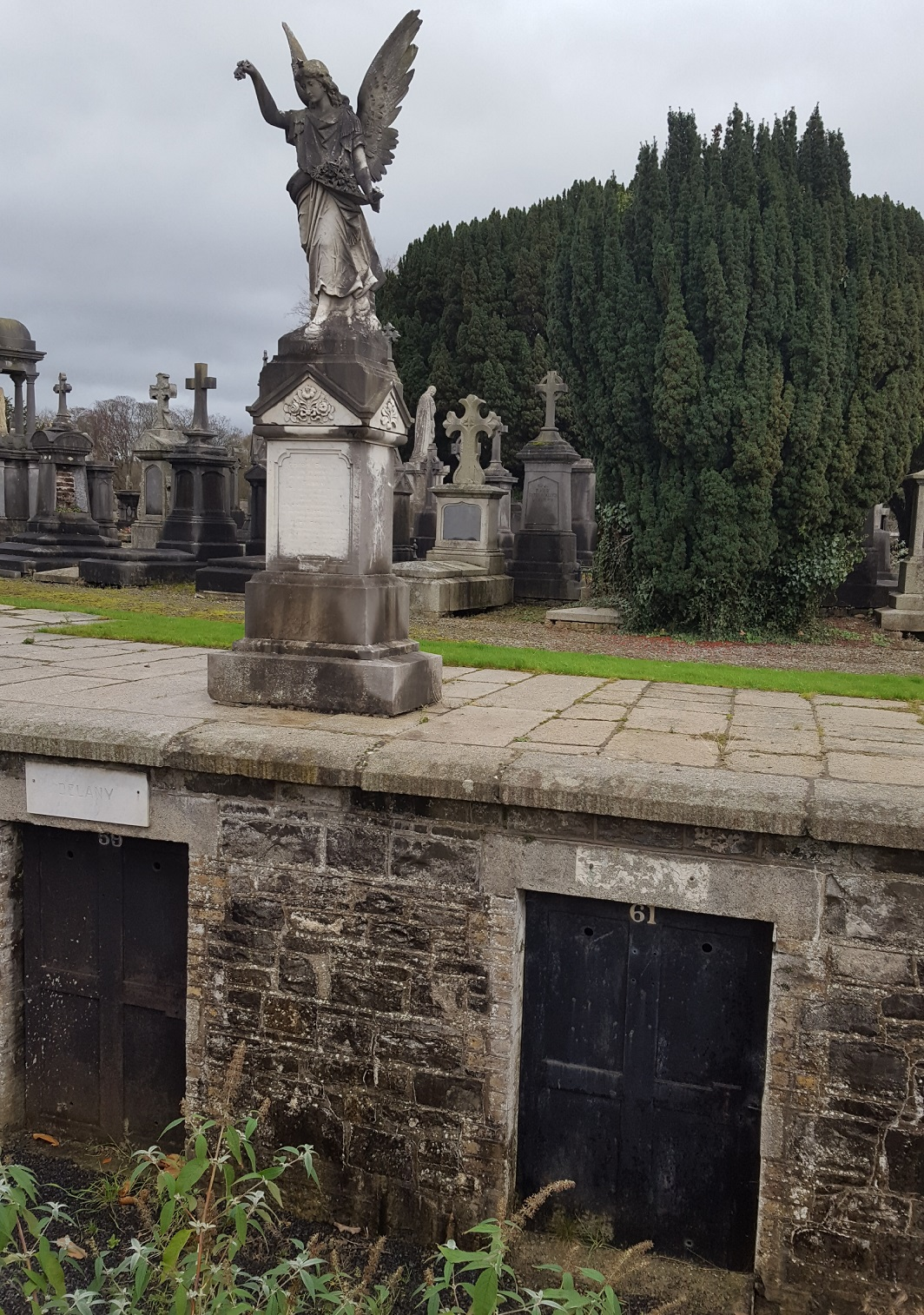
Gentili's burial vault at Glasnevin, Dublin

For two years Gentili was made president of Prior Park; but Bishop Baines' plan of combining secular and regular professors on his staff was ill-advised and eventually led to the entire withdrawal of the fathers from Prior Park College. In 1840 was opened the missionary settlement at Grace Dieu, the seat of de Lisle, from which as a centre they evangelized much of the surrounding country. Gentili's labours were rewarded on a space of some two years, by the reception of sixty-one adult converts, the baptism of sixty-six children under seven years of age and of twenty other children conditionally, and the conversion of an Anglican clergyman, Francis Wackerbarth.

In 1842 Gentili visited Oxford, where it is probable that he met Newman. He did meet one of Newman's chief and best-beloved followers, William Lockhart, a young Scottish graduate. The result was that during August of the following year, Lockhart came to visit Father Gentili at Loughborough and was received into the Catholic Church, and a little later, entered as a postulant of the Order. This conversion was the first of the Oxford Movement, preceding the reception of Newman himself by no less than two years.

The first public mission, given at Shepshed by Gentili and Furlong, had success: sixty-three converts were instructed and received at it. Public missions all over the country alternated with spiritual retreats to colleges and communities for the next five years.

The years 1844 to 1848 were occupied with numerous popular missions and retreats all over England. At Newcastle 250 adult Protestants were received into the Catholic Church; at Manchester missions in three of the principal churches produced no less than 378 converts. In 1848 Gentili gave his great mission in Dublin, where, in spite of the political excitement of that year, the confessionals were so crowded, that the priests often sat there without a break from the last instruction at night till the Mass on the following morning. Gentili died in Dublin after only a few days' illness. His remains now lie at St Michael's, Omeath in county Louth in the Republic of Ireland.
