= Grace Dieu and High Sharpley =

Protected area in Leicestershire, England

Coordinates: 52.748°N 1.352°W

- Site of Special Scientific Interest
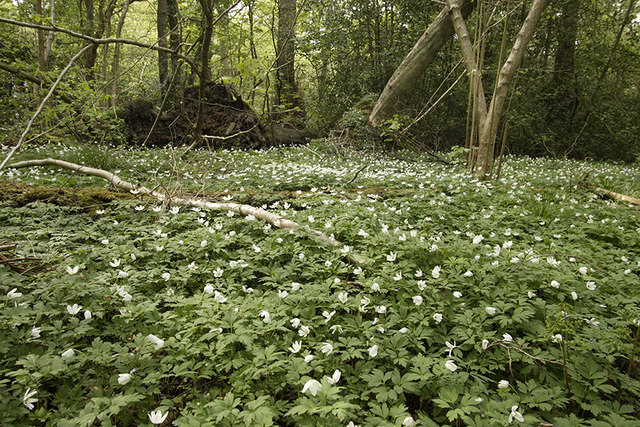
- Spring In Grace Dieu Wood
- Location of Grace Dieu and High Sharpley.
- Area of search: Leicestershire
- Grid reference: SK 438 173
- Interest: Biological; Geological
- Area: 86.0 hectares
- Notification date: 1983
- Location map: Magic Map

Grace Dieu and High Sharpley is an 86 hectare biological and geological Site of Special Scientific Interest between Coalville and Shepshed in Leicestershire. Grace Dieu Quarry is a Geological Conservation Review site.

This site is composed of several fragments of the formerly extensive Charnwood Forest, and it has diverse habitats of heath, woodland, rock, scrub and acid grassland. Grace Dieu Quarry exhibits a thin marine Lower Carboniferous layer of Carboniferous Limestone, close to the Midland shoreline around 340 million years ago.

Roads and footpaths go through some areas of the site.
