= ChildVision =

Irish charity

- Predecessor: St Joseph's Centre for the Visually Impaired
- Type: Charity
- Location: Grace Park Road, Drumcondra, Dublin 9
- Region served: Ireland
- Key people: Barry Sheridan (CEO)

ChildVision is an Irish registered charity that operates as a not-for-profit organisation in partnership with the Health Service Executive and the Department of Education & Skills. It is Ireland’s only dedicated centre for children with visual impairments, some of whom also have profound sensory impairments and additional disabilities. They are a national resource for families and professionals needing expert help in the area of visual impairment or visual impairment and/or additional disabilities, including pre-school and early intervention services, family resource services, primary and secondary schooling supports, vocational training, residential services, therapy services, nursing and ophthalmic services, professional training, a national braille production service, an equine service and a children's library

A school for blind boys, St Joseph's Asylum for the Male Blind, was founded at the Drumconda location by the Carmelites in 1859. In 1955, the Rosminians were appointed by Arthur Barton, the archbishop of Dublin, to run services for the Blind in St Joseph's. The boys' school, which became known as St Joseph's School for the Blind and Visually Impaired, was residential and was officially opened in 1960 by the Dept. of Education.

In 2012, St Joseph's became, ChildVision - the national education centre for the blind children in Ireland, a rebranding mainly concerned to emphasise the national role of the organisation. In 2014, the Rosminian order sold the lands in St Joseph's, but took out a 25-year lease on the houses and buildings it stated it will use for ChildVision.
