= Upton, County Cork =

Village in County Cork, Ireland

Upton Garraí Thancaird
- Village
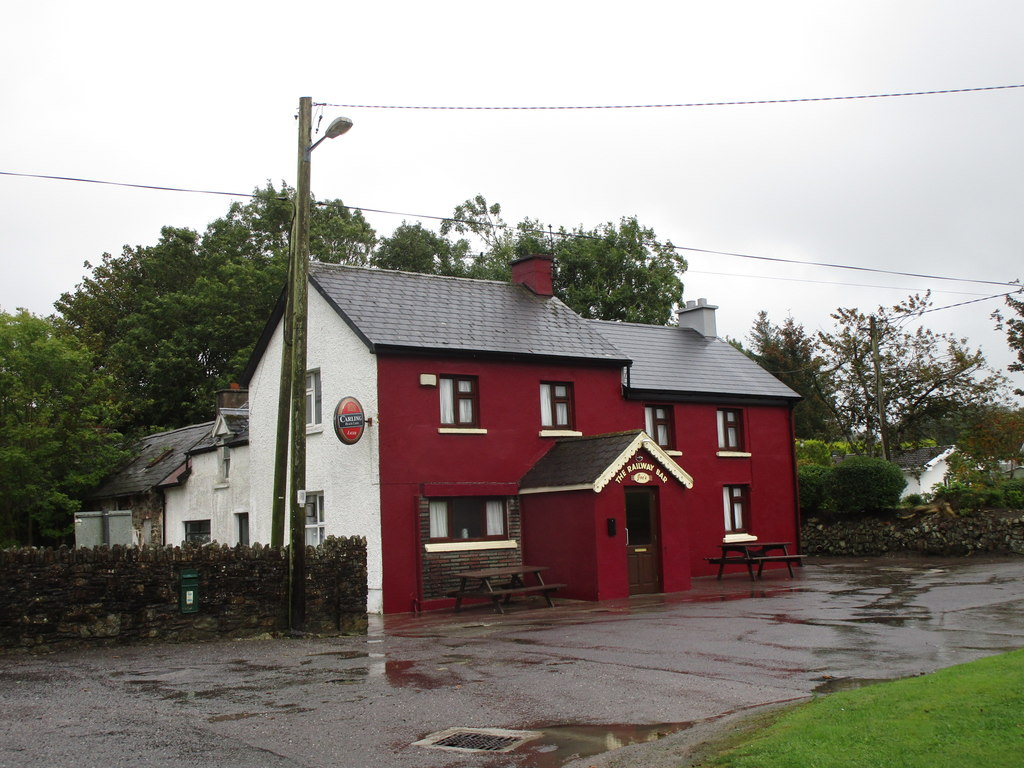
- The Railway Bar is near to the (now closed) Upton railway station

- Location in Ireland
- Coordinates: 51°47′15.61″N 08°40′18.73″W
- Country: Ireland
- Province: Munster
- County: County Cork
- Time zone: UTC+0 (WET)
  - Summer (DST): UTC-1 (IST (WEST))

Upton (Irish: Garraí Thancaird, formerly anglicised as Garryhancard) is a village in County Cork, Ireland. It was on the Cork to Bandon section of the Cork, Bandon and South Coast Railway.

== History ==
During the Irish War of Independence the local branch of the Irish Republican Army (IRA) was active. On 25 April 1920, two members of the Royal Irish Constabulary (RIC) were ambushed and killed near Upton. One of these policemen was Sergeant Cornelius Crean from near Annascaul in County Kerry, the older brother of explorer Tom Crean. The Upton train ambush took place on 15 February 1921 also during the War of Independence.

St. Patrick's Industrial School, Upton, was based in the area from the late 19th century to the 1960s.

== See also ==
- List of towns and villages in Ireland
