= Grace-Dieu =

Hamlet in Leicestershire, England

Coordinates: 52.759°N 1.349°W

- Ruin
- Location within the United Kingdom
- OS grid reference: TM 06349 22512
- Police
- Fire
- Ambulance

Grace-Dieu (/ˌɡreɪs ˈdjuː/) is a placename situated in Leicestershire, England. Its toponymy, meaning "Grace (of) God" in French, is from nearby Grace Dieu Priory, which was established in the 13th century but was left in disrepair after the dissolution of the monasteries by King Henry VIII. The priory ruins are visible from the main road to Loughborough.

Grace Dieu Manor, near Thringstone, was initially a private residence and later served as a preparatory school, known as Grace Dieu Manor School. At present, the population is recorded in the civil parish of Belton.

Gracedieu Vineyard is situated in Charnwood Forest, facing south. It was established in 1991 and has gained a reputation for producing high-quality wine, particularly its "Green Man" wine, which is made from the Madeleine Angevine grape and is noted for its fragrant floral aroma.
