= Antonio Rosmini =

Italian Catholic priest and philosopher (1797–1855)

Blessed Antonio Rosmini-Serbati IC
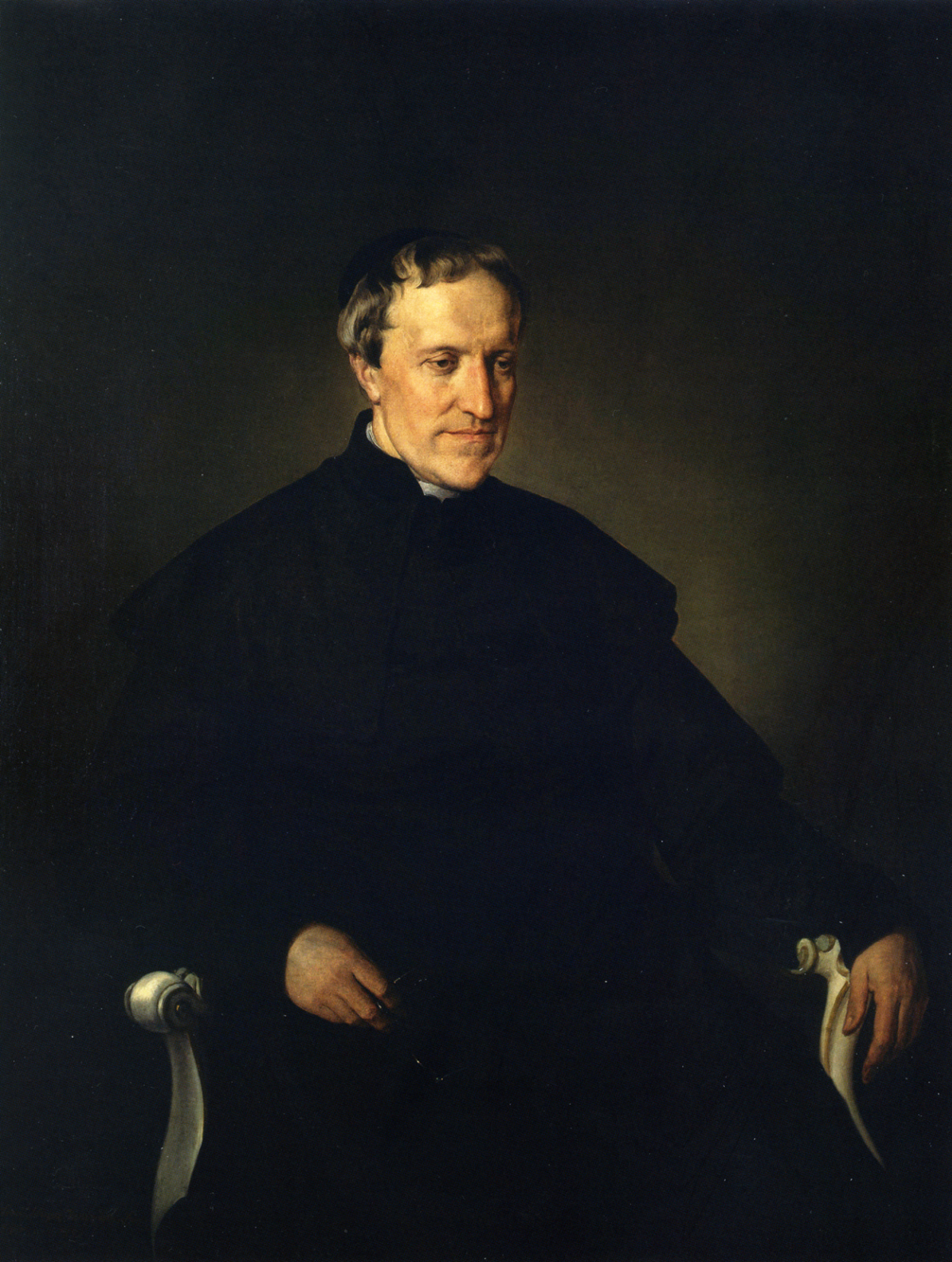
- Portrait by Francesco Hayez, 1853
- Born: 25 March 1797; Rovereto, Tyrol, Holy Roman Empire
- Died: 1 July 1855 (aged 58); Stresa, Piedmont, Kingdom of Piedmont-Sardinia

Education
- Education: University of Padua

Philosophical work
- Era: 19th-century philosophy
- Region: Western Philosophy
- Main interests: Philosophy of Mind, Moral Philosophy, Metaphysics, Epistemology, Theodicy, Natural Theology, Political Philosophy, Education

Signature
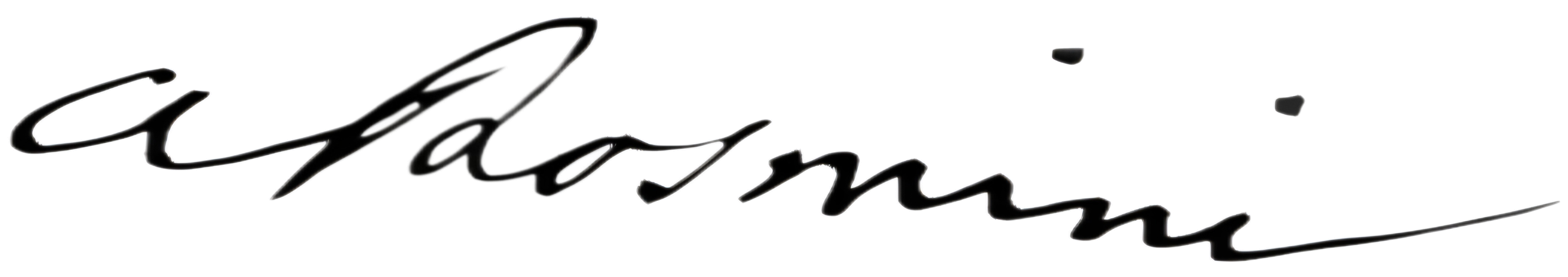

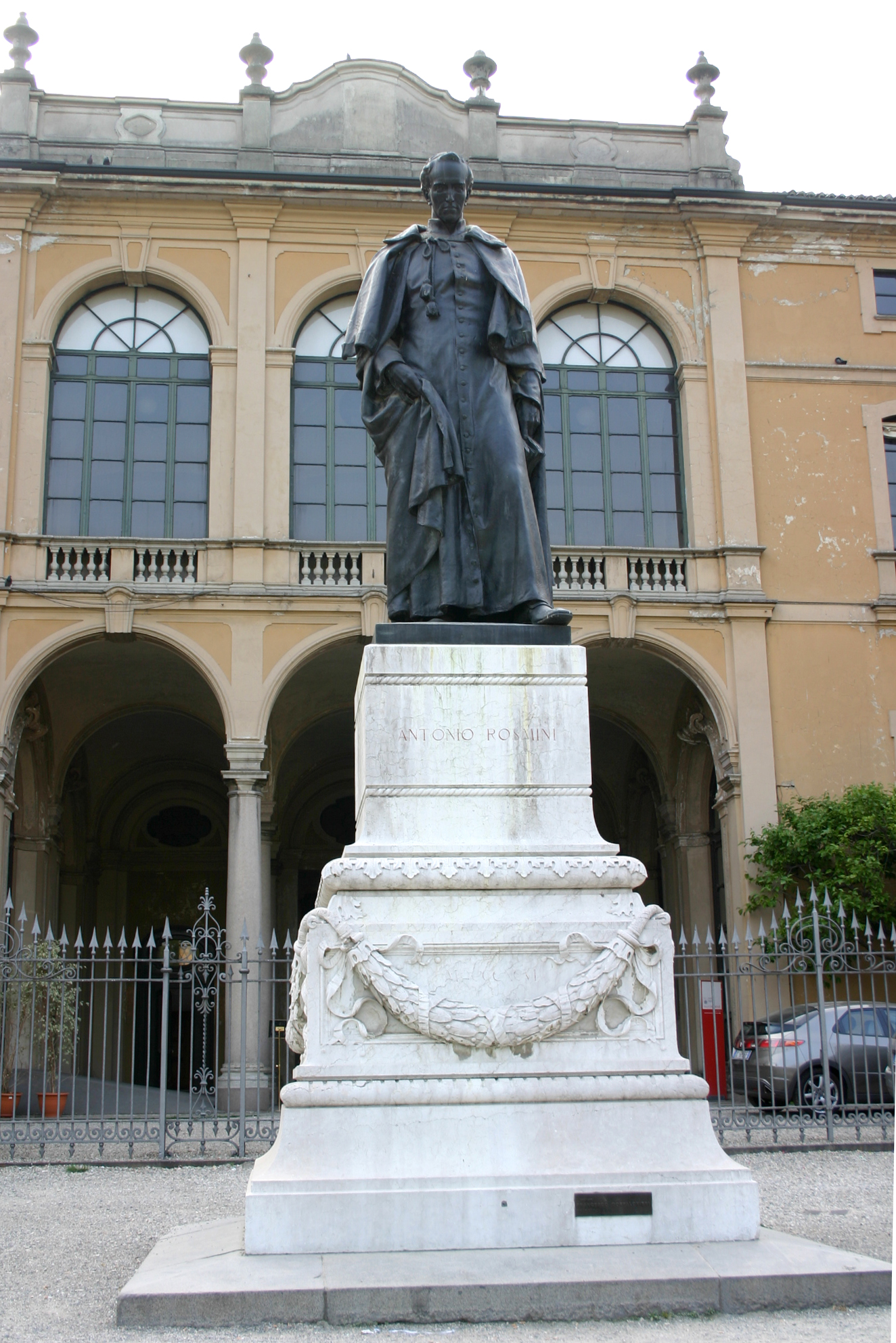
Monument to Rosmini in Milan (1896).

Antonio Francesco Davide Ambrogio Rosmini-Serbati, IC (Italian pronunciation: [anˈtɔːnjo roˈzmiːni serˈbaːti]; 25 March 1797 – 1 July 1855) was an Italian Catholic priest and philosopher. He founded the Rosminians, officially the Institute of Charity, and pioneered the concept of social justice and Italian Liberal Catholicism.

Alessandro Manzoni considered Rosmini the only contemporary Italian author worth reading. Rosmini has been beatified in the Catholic Church.

== Biography ==
Antonio Rosmini Serbati was born on 24 March 1797, at Rovereto, in the Austrian Tyrol. His brother Carlo Rosmini was a secular writer. He studied at the University of Padua, and was ordained priest at Chioggia, on 21 April 1821. In 1822 he received a Doctorate in Theology and Canon Law.

During this time Rosmini formulated his "Principle of Passivity". Rosmini felt compelled to ask himself: "Do my plans spring more from my own subjective desire to do good than from a desire to do the will of God?". Reflecting in this way, Rosmini articulated the principle in two parts: be ready to undertake any work of charity but only so long as it is God's Providence that presents it; in the meantime, immerse oneself in the commitment to continual conversion, seeking the amendment of one's own life.

=== The Institute of Charity ===
In 1828 he founded at Monte Calvario near Domodossola, a new religious community, the Institute of Charity, known generally since as the Rosminians. In the autumn of 1830, he inaugurated the observance of the rule at Calvario, and from 1834 to 1835 had charge of a parish at Rovereto. Later foundations followed at Stresa and Domodossola. The Constitutions of the institute were approved by presented to Pope Gregory XVI on 20 December 1838. The institute spread rapidly in England and Italy, and requests for foundations came from various countries.

The members might be priests or laymen, who devoted themselves to preaching, the education of youth, and works of universal charity—material, spiritual and intellectual. They work in Italy, England, Ireland, France, Wales, New Zealand, Kenya, Tanzania, India, Venezuela, and the United States. In London they were attached to the historical Church of St Etheldreda, Ely Place, Holborn. In 1962, Rosmini College School for Boys was founded in Auckland, New Zealand by Father Catcheside.

Rosmini was retained as a political advisor to the then government of Piedmont. In August 1848, he was sent to Rome by King Charles Albert of Piedmont to enlist the pope on the side of Italy as against Austria. Rosmini was invited to serve in the Roman Curia of Pope Pius IX as prime minister of the Papal States. He participated in the intellectual struggle which had for its object emancipation from Austria, but as a trusted ecclesiastical advisor and diplomat, he was not an initiator of the movement which ended in the freedom and unity of Italy. In fact, while eager for the deliverance of Italy from Austria, his aim was to bring about a confederation of the states of the country, which was to be under the control of the pope. Upon establishment of the Roman Republic, the Pontiff was forced to flee and became estranged from his former advisor in political matters. The tenuous political circumstances made it very difficult to reconcile the two men's differing projects: innovative social and juridical reforms, however modest, fell victim to the more pressing existential need to defend the supremacy of the Church's temporal powers.

== Writings: rejection and acceptance ==
Rosmini's works, Of the Five Wounds of the Holy Church and The Constitution of Social Justice (see Works below), aroused great opposition, especially among the Jesuits, and in 1849 they were placed upon the Forbidden Index. Rosmini at once declared his submission and retired to Stresa on Lago Maggiore, where he died.

Before his death he had the satisfaction of learning that the works in question were dismissed, that is, proclaimed free from censure by the Congregation of the Index. Twenty years later, the word dismissed (dimittantur) became the subject of controversy, some maintaining that it amounted to a direct approval, others that it was purely negative and did not imply that the books were free from error. Vincenzo Maria Gatti, the Dominican professor of theology at the College of Saint Thomas, the forerunner of the Pontifical University of Saint Thomas Aquinas and Master of the Sacred Palace, was instrumental in partially rehabilitating the works of Rosmini. In an article published in L'Osservatore Romano on 16 June 1876, Gatti made clear that Pius IX did not intend the "dimittantur" as amounting to wholesale condemnation.

The controversy continued until 1887, when Pope Leo XIII condemned forty of Rosmini's propositions. Referring to this condemnation, however, the Congregation for the Doctrine of the Faith issued a document in 2001 in which it declared that "the meaning of the propositions, as understood and condemned by the Decree, does not belong to the authentic position of Rosmini."

In 1998 Rosmini was named by Pope John Paul II in the encyclical Fides et Ratio as one of the greater Christian thinkers.

== Thought ==
The most comprehensive view of Rosmini's philosophical standpoint is to be found in his Sistema filosofico, in which he set forth the conception of a complete encyclopaedia of the human knowable, synthetically conjoined, according to the order of ideas, in a perfectly harmonious whole. Contemplating the position of recent philosophy from John Locke to Georg Hegel, and having his eye directed to the ancient and fundamental problem of the origin, truth and certainty of our ideas, he wrote: "If philosophy is to be restored to love and respect, I think it will be necessary, in part, to return to the teachings of the ancients, and in part to give those teachings the benefit of modern methods" (Theodicy, a. 148). He examined and analysed the facts of human knowledge, and obtained the following results:

1. that the notion or idea of being or existence, in general, enters into, and is presupposed by, all our acquired cognitions, so that, without it, they would be impossible
2. that this idea is essentially objective since what is seen in it is as distinct from and opposed to the mind that sees it as the light is from the eye that looks at it
3. that it is essentially true, because being and truth are convertible terms, and because in the vision of it, the mind cannot err, since error could only be committed by a judgment, and here there is no judgment, but a pure intuition affirming nothing and denying nothing
4. that by the application of this essentially objective and true idea the human being intellectually perceives, first, the animal body individually conjoined with him, and then, on the occasion of the sensations produced in him not by himself, the causes of those sensations, that is, from the action felt he perceives and affirms an agent, a being, and therefore a true thing, that acts on him, and he thus gets at the external world, these are the true primitive judgments, containing
  1. the subsistence of the particular being (subject), and
  2. its essence or species as determined by the quality of the action felt from it (predicate)
5. that reflection, by separating the essence or species from the subsistence, obtains the full specific idea (universalization), and then from this, by leaving aside some of its elements, the abstract specific idea (abstraction)
6. that the mind, having reached this stage of development, can proceed to further and further abstracts, including the first principles of reasoning, the principles of the several sciences, complex ideas, groups of ideas, and so on without end
7. finally, that the same most universal idea of being, this generator and formal element of all acquired cognitions, cannot itself be acquired, but must be innate in us, implanted by God in our nature. Being, as naturally shining to our mind, must therefore be what men call the light of reason. Hence the name Rosmini gives it of ideal being; and this he laid down as the fundamental principle of all philosophy and the supreme criterion of truth and certainty. This he believed to be the teaching of St Augustine, as well as of St Thomas, of whom he was an ardent admirer and defender.

According to Father Battista Mondin, Rosmini's philosophy cannot be defined as Thomism because it lacks the fundamental real distinction between essence and existence (Actus essendi), as well as the conception of God as Esse ut Actus.

== The cause for canonization ==
On 26 June 2006, Pope Benedict XVI signed a Decree of the heroic virtues, and hence declared Rosmini to be Venerable. On 3 June 2007, Pope Benedict XVI authorized the promulgation of a decree approving Rosmini's beatification. On 18 November 2007, he was beatified in Novara, Italy.

== Works ==
Of his numerous works, of which a collected edition in 17 volumes was issued in Milan (1842–44), supplemented by Opere postume in 5 volumes (Turin, 1859–74), the most important are:

- The origin of ideas. Translated by anonymous (Translated from the 5th Italian ed.). London: Keegan Paul, Trench. 1883. OCLC 818116370.
- The Principles of Moral Science (1831)
- The Restoration of Philosophy in Italy (1836)
- The Philosophy of Right (1841–45)

The following have also been translated into English:

- The constitution under social justice. Translated by Alberto Mingardi. Lexington Books. 2006. ISBN 9780739107256.
- A Catholic catechism. Translated by William Seth Agar. 1849.
- Liddon, Henry P., ed. (1883). Of the five wounds of the Holy Church (abridged ed.). ISBN 9780837084664.
- Maxims of Christian perfection. Translated by anonymous. London: Richardson. 1849.
- Psychology (Anonymous) (1884–88)
- A short sketch of modern philosophies and of his own system. Translated by William Lockhart. London: Burns and Oates. 1882. OCLC 551258110.
- The ruling principle of method applied to education. Translated by Maria Georgina Grey. Boston: D.C. Heath. 1887. OCLC 769155902.
- Letters. Translated by Dominic Gazzola. London [u.a.]: Washbourne [u.a.] 1901.
