= St Patrick's Industrial School, Upton =

St Patrick's Industrial School, Upton was an industrial school in Upton, County Cork, Ireland.

== History ==
A local judge suggested setting up a reformatory school to serve Cork and the local Society of Saint Vincent de Paul set up a committee in 1858 to plan it. They bought a 112-acre (0.45 km^{2}) farm near Upton, County Cork and asked the Rosminians to run it. Richard Brash designed a building which was completed in 1860. The main building was in the shape of a square around a central courtyard. In 1872 the lease was transferred to the Rosminians.

When the Industrial Schools Act was extended to Ireland in 1868 the Rosminians applied to have the school classed as an industrial school, which happened in 1889. It was called Danesfort Industrial School and operated until October 1966.

The farm increased in size over the years, eventually reaching about 220 acres (0.89 km^{2}) at the time of its closure.

The school closed because of the falling number of boys, lack of trained staff, and reorganisation and rationalisation led to the closure which had been discussed for a number of years. A fire that occurred a few months before the closure destroyed a large part of the building, but it was not the reason for closure.

In 1972 it reopened as a centre for adults who were mentally handicapped or who had learning difficulties. Although the Rosminians handed over ownership to the state in 2003 they continue to exercise a pastoral role.

== Commission to investigate Child Abuse ==
=== Physical Abuse ===
Industrial schools were required to keep punishment books - records of misconduct and punishments. Of all the industrial schools, only Upton and St. Joseph's Industrial School, Dundalk were able to produce them, even then they only covered a fraction of the time under investigation.

The latter book covers a period covered by the Commissions' remit, but the Commission criticised it for being less systematic, less complete and inconsistency in breaches of rules listed. Despite this, there is enough evidence in the second book to show that punishments were as described by those complaining of abuse and not as described by some former staff.

Punishment was excessive and brutal. It was used by both religious and lay staff for control and was not supervised.

=== Sexual abuse ===
Sexual abuse by members of the religious order was a chronic problem and it was dealt with in a manner that put the interests of the order, the institution and even the abuser ahead of that of the children. Abusers were transferred to other institutions, putting children at those institutions at risk. The order was aware of the criminal nature of the abuse, but did not treat it as a crime. The action of one Brother Alfonso (a pseudonym) exposed many abusers.

Abuse by boys was not regarded by staff as serious and was downplayed to protect the reputation of the school. The Department of Education did not carry out its responsibilities in regard to supervising the school or protecting children.

=== Neglect ===
Food clothing and accommodation were below acceptable standards. Boys went hungry and the food that there was for them was of inferior quality to that eaten by brothers and priests in the school. Punishment and fear interfered with learning. The remote location of the school caused emotional harm to the boys.
