= Margaret Ward =

English Catholic martyr (1550–1588)

Saint Margaret Ward
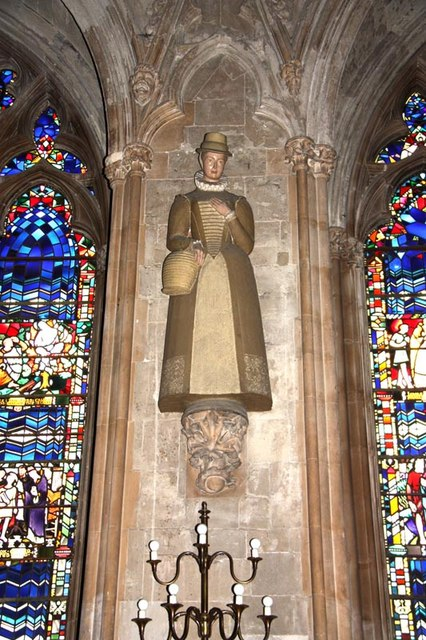
- Statue of St Margaret Ward in St Etheldreda's Church, London.

Martyr
- Born: in the 1550s Congleton, Cheshire, England
- Died: 30 August 1588; Tyburn, London, England
- Venerated in: Roman Catholic Church; Anglican Communion
- Beatified: 15 December 1929 by Pope Pius XI
- Canonized: 25 October 1970 by Pope Paul VI
- Feast: 25 October (in England), 4 May
- Attributes: basket, rope

Margaret Ward (c. 1550–30 August 1588), called the "pearl of Tyburn", was an English saint and martyr who was executed during the reign of Elizabeth I for assisting a priest to escape from prison. She was canonised in 1970, as one of the Forty Martyrs of England and Wales.

== Life ==
Margaret Ward was born in Congleton, Cheshire, in Northwest England, around 1550. Not much is known about Ward's early life, except that, as the Catholic Encyclopedia states, "she was of a good family" and was described as a gentlewoman. According to hagiographer Alban Butler, Ward was a victim of the renewed persecution in England at the time, during the reign of Elizabeth I.

Ward worked as a housekeeper or companion in the home "of a lady of distinction" named Whitall in London. Ward decided to help William Watson, a priest and conspirator, later executed for treason, who was imprisoned in the Bridewell prison. Butler stated that "her story is largely part of" Watson's. Ward befriended the gaoler's wife, took food to Watson, and smuggled in rope to help Watson escape. She arranged for two Catholic watermen to meet Watson on the Thames below the prison walls; even though he broke his arm and leg during his escape, he was picked up by the watermen, "who rowed him to a safe hiding place". Watson left the rope hanging from the prison wall and it was traced back to Ward. She was arrested, charged, and tried for "aiding a traitor to escape" and was tortured by being hung by her wrists and beaten for eight days.

According to Robert Southwell, a martyr and Jesuit priest, Ward "was flogged and hung up by the wrists, the tips of her toes only touching the ground, for so long a time that she was crippled and paralyzed, but these sufferings greatly strengthened the glorious martyr for her last struggle". John Roche, who was either her servant or one of the watermen who helped Watson escape on the river and exchanged clothes with him, was arrested and tried with Ward. They were offered release if they asked for the queen's pardon and agreed to "conform to the established Church", but they refused and were hanged at Tyburn on 30 August 1588.

== Veneration ==
Ward and Roche were beatified in a large group in 1929 and Ward was canonised as one of the Forty Martyrs of England and Wales by Pope Paul VI in 1970. Her feast day, for both the Roman Catholic Church and the Episcopal Church, is August 30.

Ward is depicted in panels in St Joseph's Church in Sale and St Alban's Church in Wallasey, in the Diocese of Shrewsbury, in the North West and West Midlands of England. There was a wooden statue of her in St Lawrence's Church in Birkenhead, a school and church are named for her in Sale, and another church in Holmes Chapel also is named for her. St Margaret Ward Catholic Academy in Tunstall, Staffordshire, is named after her as well.
