= Rosminians =

Male religious congregation of the Catholic Church

Institute of Charity
- Institutum Caritatis
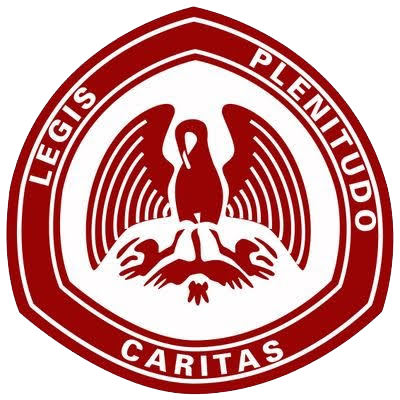
- Seal of the Institute of Charity
- Abbreviation: I.C.
- Nickname: Rosminians
- Formation: 2 February 1828; 198 years ago
- Founder: Blessed Fr. Antonio Rosmini, I.C.
- Type: Clerical Religious Congregation of Pontifical Right for men
- Headquarters: San Giovanni a Porta Latina, Via di Porta Latina 17, Rome, Italy
- Members: 266 members (includes 175 priests) as of 2020
- Superior General: Fr. Marco Andrea Tanghetti, I.C.
- Parent organization: Catholic Church
- Website: https://www.rosminians.com/

The Rosminians, officially named the Institute of Charity (Latin: Institutum Caritatis), abbreviated I.C., are a Catholic clerical religious congregation of Pontifical Right for men founded by Antonio Rosmini and first organised in 1828.

The order was formally approved by the Holy See in 1838, and took its name from "charity" as the fullness of Christian virtue. Its members are commonly called Fathers of Charity and use the postnominal letters IC.

== Foundation ==
Antonio Rosmini-Serbati (1797-1855), also known as Antonio Rosmini, was an Italian from Rovereto in the Austrian Tyrol, ordained in 1821. His two life principles, written down at this time were: First, to apply himself to correct his faults and purify his soul by prayer and living a life as close to the teaching of Christ as possible. Second, to accept any opportunity to do charitable work. This principle was soon put to the test when the Marchioness di Canossa asked him to establish an institute for the education of poor boys. Rosmini saw this as God's hand at work.

In 1827 Rosmini was in Milan and met the Abbé Loewenbruck who informed him that he had been thinking about establishing a religious institute which would help to promote better education and spirituality in the clergy. Again, Rosmini saw the hand of God in this request. Still, as Rosmini believed that God would do the necessary prompting, he did not seek out anyone to join the new society he planned to establish. Two or three people who knew his thoughts joined him by their own request, and the three began to live according to the principles Rosmini had established.

Pius VIII, who was elected pope in the following March, called him to an audience. "If you think", said Pius, "of beginning with something small, and leaving all the rest to God, we gladly approve; not so if you thought of starting on a large scale." Rosmini answered that he had always proposed a very humble beginning. In the autumn of 1830, he gave the institute something of its current form; and all the community began to pass through stages of religious training.

Such was the state of affairs when on 2 February 1831, Rosmini's friend, Cardinal Cappellari, was chosen pope and took the name of Gregory XVI. Gregory was a supporter of the institute, and published a papal brief in March, calling the new society by its name and rejoicing in its progress under the approval of the bishops.

It was not until March 1837, that Rosmini submitted the constitutions of his religious society for papal approval. The matter was entrusted to the Congregation of Bishops and Regulars, which declared, on 16 June, its general commendation, but also its judgment that it was as yet too young to be approved as a regular congregation. There was also a problem with Rosmini's understanding of the religious vow of poverty. The normal practice was for members of a religious congregation to renounce all possessions, whereas the constitutions drawn up by Rosmini permitted members to hold personal property.

On 20 December 1838, the Vatican's congregation met again and gave its opinion that the society should have the status of a religious congregation; the pope immediately ratified this decision. On the following 25 March, the vows were first made, by 20 in Italy and 5 in England. Five of these then went to Rome and on 22 August, in the Catacombs of St Sebastian made the fourth vow of special obedience to the pope. Apostolic letters embodying Rosmini's own summary of the constitutions were issued on 20 September, naming Rosmini as the first provost-general of the institute for life.

== Spirit and organisation ==
The spirit of the Rosminian community is strongly characterised by the belief that God speaks to people in a variety of ways, and makes His will known according to the abilities of each person. For the Rosminian, the main ways God prompts people are:

- through the request of someone in need;
- through someone speaking on behalf of a person in need;
- through the needs themselves being seen.

== Membership ==
There are two kinds of membership in the Institute of Charity. The first are those who take on themselves the discipline of the society and bind themselves by vows of poverty, chastity and obedience. The second is normally composed of people who are married, but may include those who are single but do not feel called to the religious life. These people strive to live according to the Rosminian charism, to pray daily and to meet with others when possible.

As with all religious communities, a person who wishes to embrace the vows of poverty, chastity and obedience, goes through a period of intense discernment. After two years of noviceship, the first profession is made which includes the temporary vows of poverty, chastity and obedience. He thus becomes a scholastic, but is not incorporated into the institute until he becomes a coadjutor after a further period of religious, spiritual and academic preparation. Coadjutors add the promise of not seeking any promotion either within the society or outside. Religious vows are renewed at this time, but now for life.

== Vows ==
For Rosminians, poverty does not mean relinquishing all possessions, but rather not being possessed by one's possessions; to this end, members of the congregation have always been permitted to own personal possessions. The vow of chastity is understood in the sense of not only remaining unmarried and abstaining from sexual activity, but also in how people are to be treated. The vow of obedience means listening to the requests of those in charge, taking into account the good of God's people, and prayerfully seeking to see the hand of God in what is being asked.

== Further information ==
The institute is governed by a provost-general chosen by elected members. He has full powers except for a few exceptional cases. The institute is divided into provinces. The Provincial Superior of the Gentili Province which covers England and Wales, Ireland, the United States and New Zealand is Father David Myers.

The main houses in Italy are Monte Calvario, which has long been both a novitiate and house of theological study; the college founded in 1839 for young boys at Stresa, and the large college for older ones at Domodossola built in 1873. The care of the Sanctuary of S. Michele della Chiusa, an ancient abbey on a steep mountain peak near Turin, was accepted in 1835.

The founding of the English province is inseparably linked with the names of Luigi Gentili and Ambrose de Lisle. They were sent by Rosmini in 1835 with two companions to teach both lay and church students. Invited to the Midland district, the fathers taught for a while at Old Oscott, and in 1841 opened the mission of Loughborough at St Mary's Church. Many converts were made and some missions were founded in the neighbourhood, and in 1843 the first public mission ever preached in England was given by Gentili. In the same year at Ratcliffe, near Leicester, the foundations were laid for a novitiate designed by Pugin, but it became a school.

The Rosminians serve in 15 parishes throughout England and Wales.

== Irish Province ==
The Rosminians of the Irish Province were appointed by the Archbishop of Dublin to run services for the blind in St Joseph's, Drumcondra, Dublin in 1955, the School, originally called St Joseph's Asylum for the Male Blind was founded by the Carmelites in 1859, and moved in 1870 to the lands of Drumcondra Castle. The School which became known as St Joseph's School for the Blind, and Visually Impaired, was residential for boys and was officially opened in 1960 by the Dept. of Education.

In 2012 St Joseph's became ChildVision the national education centre for blind children in Ireland. ChildVision run assessment, speech and language, education, a garden, a petting zoo, and an Equine Therapy facility in St Joseph's, there is also a centre in Cork. They run preschool services, and vocational training, as well as assisting the on-campus, primary and secondary schools. In 2014 the Rosminian order sold the lands in St Joseph's but took out a 25-year lease on the houses and buildings which it will use for ChildVision.

St. Joseph's Primary School for Children with Visual Impairment, and works closely with ChildVision. In 2003, visually impaired and blind girls, were first admitted to St Joseph's, when St Mary's School for Visually Impaired Girls closed in Mount Merrion.

In 1970 Rosmini College an all-boys school was founded, which became PobalScoil Rosmini in 1982 in a new building, serving as a mainstream secondary school for the locality as well for the visually impaired students. In 2002 Rosmini Community College became co-educational, and in 2003 accepted in its first visually impaired girls. The Rosmini Gaels GAA Club was set up by former staff of the school.

The Rosminians also ran Clonturk House, which closed in 2009 as a home for adult visually impaired men, where one of its former residents was the renowned Dublin character Thomas Dudley (known as Bang Bang), who is buried in the Cemetery on the St Joseph's lands.

== Child sexual abuse scandals ==
=== St Michael's Catholic Boarding School, Soni, Tanzania ===
A prominent United Kingdom member of the order, Kit Cunningham, together with three other Rosminian priests were exposed after Cunningham's death as paedophiles. While at Soni, Cunningham perpetrated sexual abuse that made the school, according to one pupil, "a loveless, violent and sad hellhole". Other pupils recall being photographed naked, hauled out of bed at night to have their genitals fondled and other sexual abuse. Although known about by the Rosminians before Cunningham's death in 2010, the abuse was only publicly revealed by the media in 2011. Formal action was launched by 22 former pupils at the civil court in Leicester on 20 March 2013.

=== Grace Dieu Manor Catholic School, UK ===
Victims of abuse by staff at Grace Dieu Manor School, England are suing the Rosminians. Their abuse was catalogued in the BBC documentary Abused: Breaking the Silence.

=== Industrial schools in Ireland ===
The Rosminians ran St Joseph's Industrial School, Clonmel (known as Ferryhouse) and St Patrick's Industrial School, Upton. Both were investigated by the Commission to Inquire into Child Abuse. Like many residential institutions in Ireland, following the publication of the Ryan report in 2009, Ferryhouse and Upton were recognised as places of systematic physical and sexual abuse of children carried on over many years. Sexual abuse by members of the religious order was a chronic problem and it was dealt with in a manner that put the interests of the order, the institution and even the abuser ahead of that of the children. Abusers were transferred to other institutions, putting children at those institutions at risk. The Rosminian order was aware of the criminal nature of the abuse, but did not treat it as a crime.

=== Apology for English abuse by the provincial of English Rosminians ===
According to an online news story, issued on 23 June 2011: "Following the U.K. broadcast of a documentary detailing the abuse of some 35 boys by four Rosminian priests in the 1960s, the order's provincial in England released an apology for the acts of abuse and for our inadequate response."

=== Settlement ===
The audited financial statements for the year ending 5 April 2015 report under the heading “Legal and safeguarding related costs" that "Last year’s report referred to legal claims which had been brought against the Charity concerning the welfare of children between approximately 1940 and 1985. A settlement has now been reached in relation to these claims." The Charity was liable also for the claimants' legal fees. The matter has had a significant impact on the Charity's finances with payment of their legal and settlement costs amounting to a total GBP 1,746,523 for the year.

== Schools ==
- Colegio Antonio Rosmini, Maracaibo, Venezuela
- Ratcliffe College, Ratcliffe on the Wreake, Leicestershire
- Rosmini High School, Tanga, Tanzania
- Rosmini College, Auckland, New Zealand
- ChildVision, Drumcondra, Ireland
- St Joseph's Primary School for Children with Visual Impairment, Drumcondra, Ireland
- Unidad Educativa Juan XXIII, Cabimas, Venezuela
- Rosmini Community School, Drumcondra, Ireland
- St Peter's College, Gore, New Zealand

Defunct

- Grace Dieu Manor School, near Thringstone, Leicestershire, United Kingdom
- St Michael's School, Soni (in the Usambara Mountains), Tanzania

== People ==
The elected provost-generals, since Rosmini's death were

Giambattista Pagani, who succeeded in 1855,
Bertetti (1860),
Cappa (1874),
Lanzoni (1877),
Bernardino Balsari (1901)
Giuseppe Bozzetti (1935)
Giovanni Gaddo (1956)
Giambattista Zantedeschi (1989)
James Flynn, an Irish priest (1997).

Other members of the order include:

Aloysius Gentili (1801-1848), missionary in England and Ireland;
Vincenzo de Vit (1810-1892), known principally for two works of vast labour and research, the Lexicon totius Latinitatis, a new and greatly enlarged edition of Forcellini, and the Onomasticon, a dictionary of proper names;
Paolo Perez, formerly professor at Padua, and master of a singularly delicate Italian style;
Lorenzo Gastaldi (1815-1883), bishop of Saluzzo, Archbishop of Turin;
Peter Hutton, headmaster of Ratcliffe
William Lockhart (1820–1892), an English convert
Francisco Cardozo Ayres (1821-1870), Bishop of Pernambuco (Suriname), who died at Rome during the First Vatican Council, and whose incorrupt body was transported with great veneration to his see;
Giuseppe Calza (1821-1898), philosopher;
Richard Richardson, organizer of a temperance campaign who enrolled 70,000 names;
Joseph Hirst, member of the Royal Archaeological Institute;
Clemente Rebora (1885-1957), poet;
Eugene Arthurs (1916-1978), Irishman, first bishop of Tanga (Tanzania);
Antonio Riboldi (1923- ), Rebora's pupil, Bishop emeritus of Acerra.

== See also ==
- Sisters of Providence of the Institute of Charity
