= Grace Dieu Priory =

Augustinian priory in Leicestershire, England

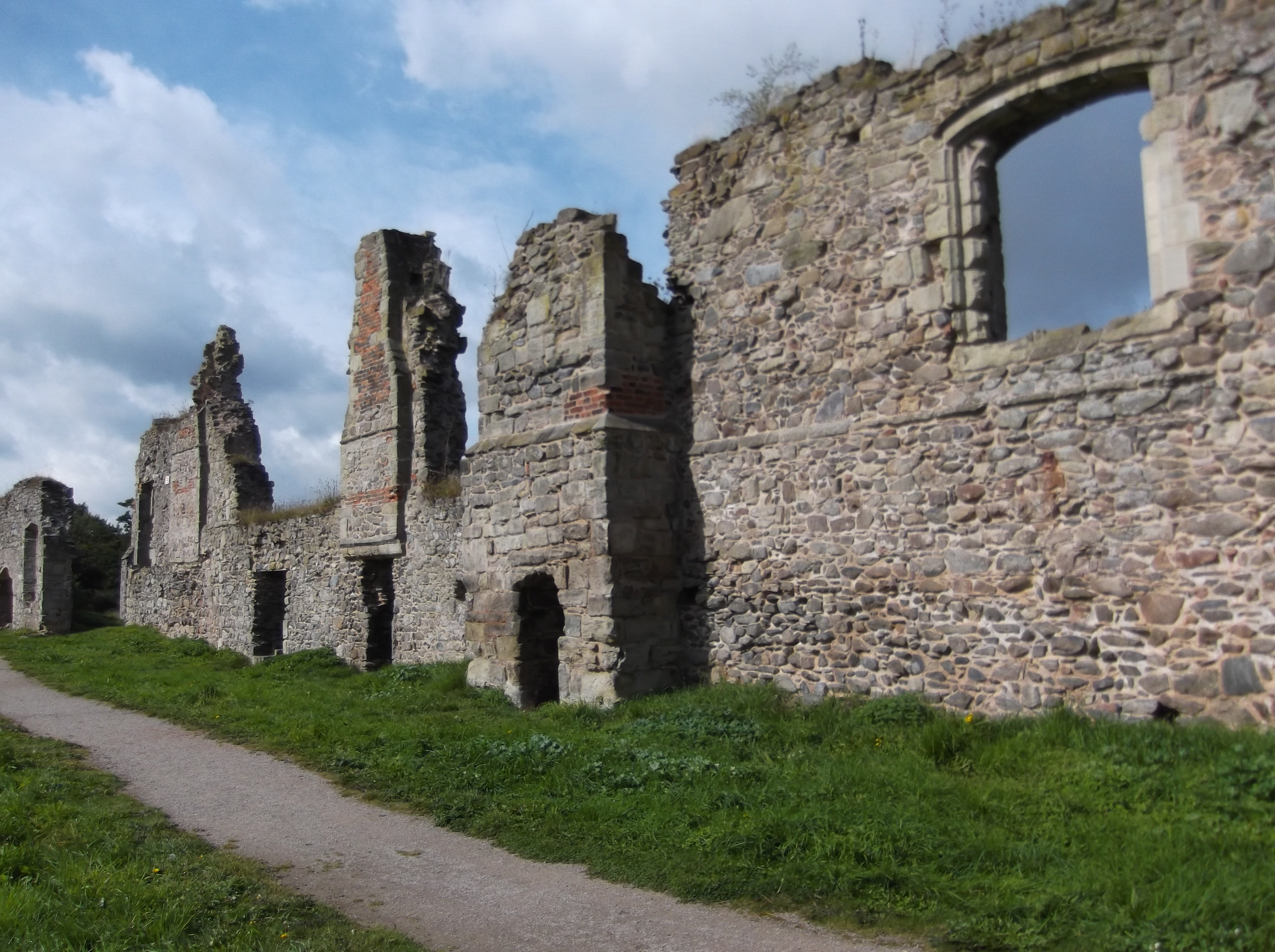
- The remains of the south range of Grace Dieu Priory

- Location within Leicestershire
- Interactive map of Grace Dieu Priory

Monastery information
- Order: Augustinian: "The White Nuns of St Augustine"
- Established: 1239
- Disestablished: 1538
- Dedication: Holy Trinity and St Mary

People
- Founder: Roesia de Verdun

Architecture
- Heritage designation: Scheduled Ancient Monument Grade II Listed Building
- Designated date: 7 December 1962

Site
- Location: Near Thringstone, Leicestershire, England
- Coordinates: 52°45′39.50″N 1°21′24.06″W
- Visible remains: South range, chapter house, east end of conventual church - all to a height of not more than one storey
- Public access: Yes: Free to enter.
- Website: gracedieupriory.org.uk facebook.com/gracedieupriory

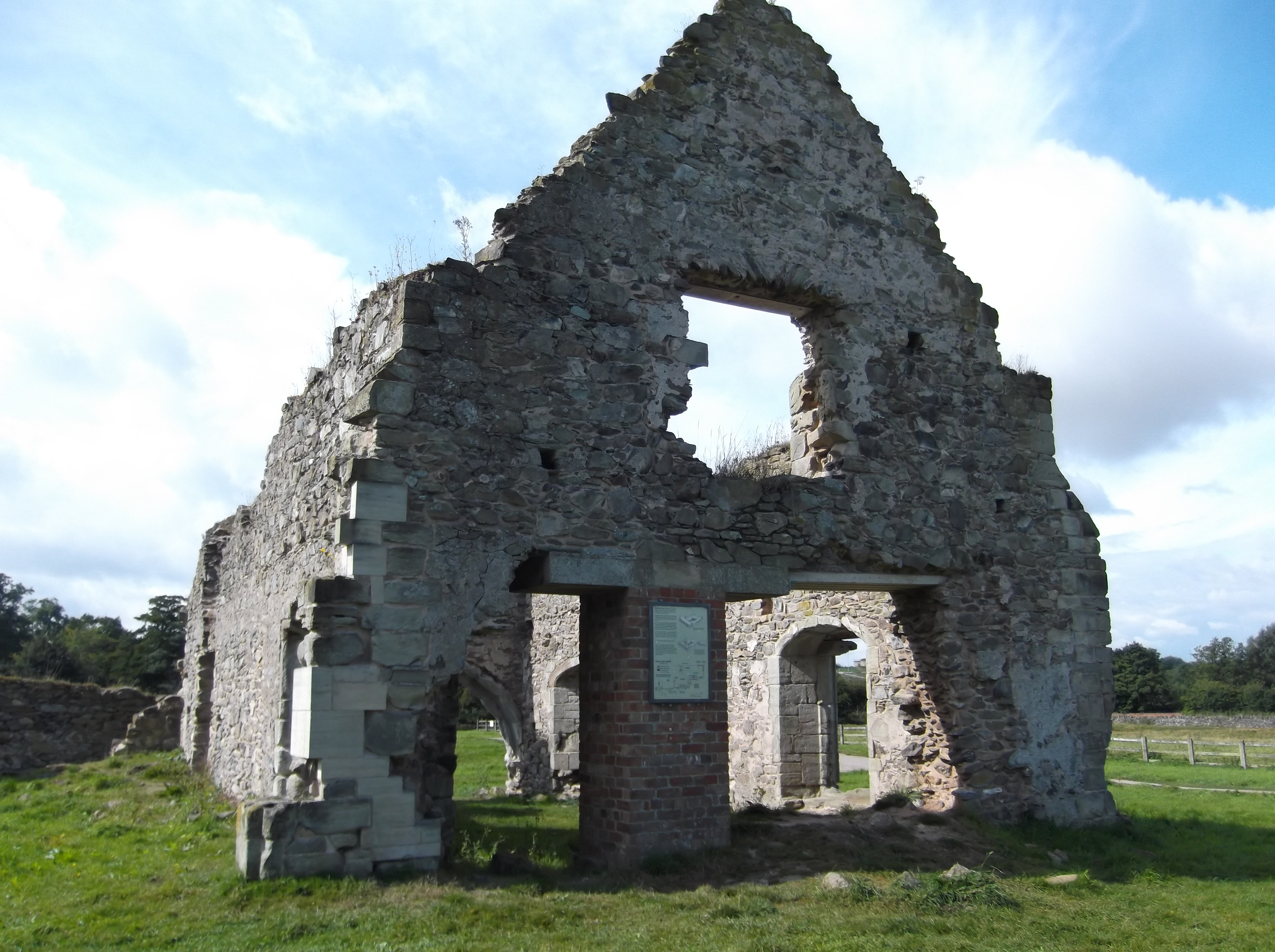
Grace Dieu Priory chapter house

The Grace Dieu Priory was an independent Augustinian priory near Thringstone in Leicestershire, England. It was founded around 1235-1241 by Roesia de Verdun and dissolved in 1538. It was dedicated to the Holy Trinity and St Mary.

The site is managed by the Friends of Grace Dieu Priory, a charitable group of volunteers who fundraise to care for the site and keep it open to the public for free.

== History ==
The priory was founded c.1239 by Roesia (or Rohesia) de Verdun. The priory was endowed with the manors of Belton, Leicestershire and "Kirkby in Kesteven" (Kirkby la Thorpe?), Lincolnshire; as well as the advowson of the Church of St John the Baptist, Belton. The priory was unusual in being independent of outside control. The nuns called themselves "the White Nuns of St Augustine", and there is thought to be no other houses of their order in the country.

The priory was fairly large, having in 1337 sixteen nuns. It also had an attached hospital which cared for twelve poor people. The priory did, however, have some unusual practices; for example, the nuns were forbidden to ever leave the priory's precincts.

The priory escaped the first wave of dissolution of the smaller monasteries, but was finally dissolved in October 1538. The tomb of Roesia de Verdun was moved to St John's Church, Belton.

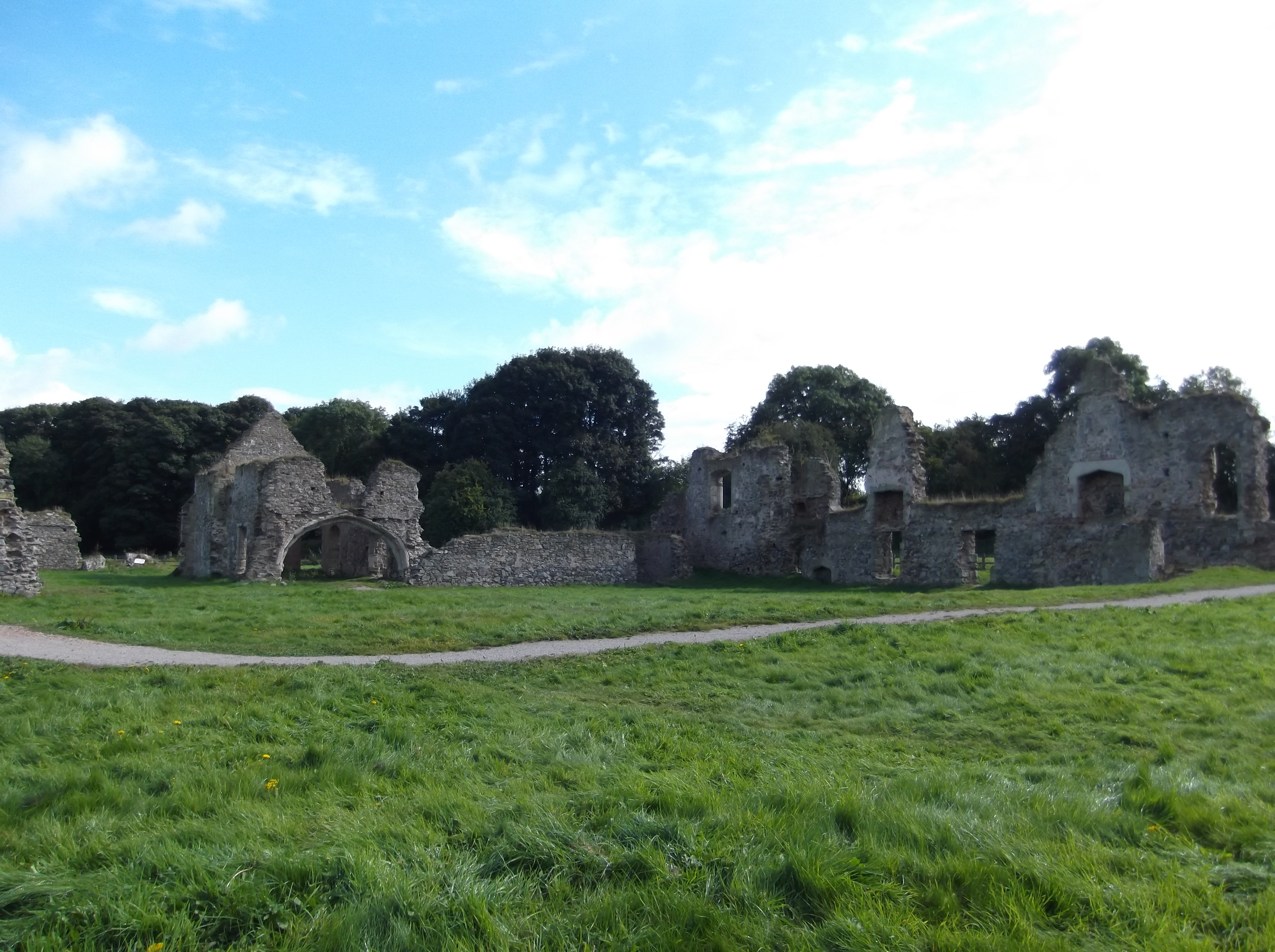
View across the cloister, of the chapter house and south range, from the west end of the nave of the conventual church

=== After dissolution ===
Following the dissolution, the site was granted to Sir Humphrey Foster who sold it to John Beaumont, the Master of the Rolls, in 1539. He converted the priory buildings into a residence which remained within his family until 1684, when it was bought by Sir Ambrose Phillipps, a wealthy lawyer, who also built nearby Garendon Hall. Sir Ambrose had most of the buildings pulled down, and by 1730 the remaining buildings were ruinous, with only two sections still roofed.

The priory passed through the Phillipps and March families until 1833 when Charles March-Phillipps gave the priory to his son Ambrose Lisle March Phillipps, who assumed the surname "De Lisle". Ambrose constructed a new house in the Tudor-gothic style, known as Grace Dieu Manor, 300 yards (270 m) south of the priory ruins. The March Phillipps de Lisle family owned the house until 1933, although their main residence was at the Hall they built at the former Garendon Abbey. Following the death of two of its heads in quick succession, the family needed to reduce its expenditure and so in 1885 moved out of Garendon and into Grace Dieu Manor. A return to fortune allowed the family to return to Garendon in 1907. In 1964 Garendon Hall was demolished and the family returned to Grace Dieu for a final time, selling the house within a decade. The manor then became a Catholic school, Grace Dieu Manor School. In 1972 the family moved to Quenby Hall, but following the collapse of the family cheese-making business, the family has been forced to offer the Hall for sale (it has been for sale since 2012).

The priory buildings still exist as ruins. A conservation project on the remains was completed in 2005. It is managed by the Friends of Grace Dieu Priory, who work together with the Grace Dieu Priory Trust and the Grace Dieu Estate to ensure it stays open to members of the public. In 2024 the Rosminian Order transferred ownership to the Grace Dieu Priory Trust for a nominal sum.

== Paranormal claims ==
The ruins are home to the mythical ghost, the White Lady. A record of sightings, dating back to 1926, has been compiled by Stephen Neale Badcock. Many of the sightings tend to refer to white or grey apparitions, robed, with no hands or feet, hovering or gliding above ground level and appearing on the opposite side of the road to the priory, in the vicinity of an old 'bus shelter.

Paul Devereux refers to the Grace Dieu phenomenon in his 1982 book, Earth Lights: Towards and Explanation of the UFO Enigma, and sets out his theory that such manifestations are wrought by unusual electromagnetic fields associated with fault areas which interfere with the normal cycles of the atmosphere. Neale Badcock's research has shown that the site of Grace Dieu Priory is on the Thringstone Fault, shown on a geological map produced by the Leicester Literary and Philosophical Society in 1965. The site is also located close to a standing stone, in a field to the west of the priory, examples of which are often found close to geological faults. The presence of this stone suggests that the area may have been regarded as a sacred site in ancient times, Mesolithic flint scrapers having been found around the base of the stone.

It has been suggested that the site's prehistoric religious significance may have influenced the choice of location for the mediaeval monastic foundation. However, whilst this may have been the case for many Christian foundations during the Anglo-Saxon period (the nearby parish church at Whitwick, for example, would almost certainly date back to an Anglo-Saxon origin, intentionally sited in a sacred place, above a natural spring) it is probable that the link between the much later foundation of Grace Dieu Priory and a site of possible pagan significance occurs more by co-incidence. Hillier and Ryder suggest that the chief influence would have been its proximity to a fresh water source.

Paranormal events organised by third parties are not permitted by the Grace Dieu Priory Trust, the owners of the site.

== See also ==
- Abbeys and priories in England
