= Drayton, Leicestershire =

Village in Leicestershire, England

Coordinates: 52.521°N 0.777°W

Drayton
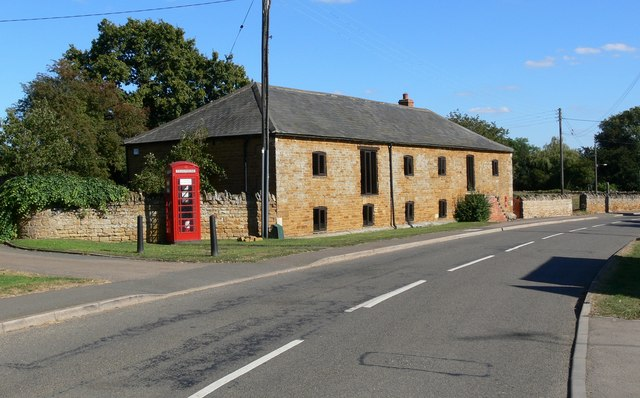
- Main Street, Drayton

- Location within Leicestershire
- Population: 190 (2011)
- OS grid reference: SP830922
- District: Harborough
- Shire county: Leicestershire
- Region: East Midlands
- Country: England
- Sovereign state: United Kingdom
- Post town: Market Harborough
- Postcode district: LE16
- Police: Leicestershire
- Fire: Leicestershire
- Ambulance: East Midlands
- UK Parliament: Rutland and Stamford

Drayton is a small village and civil parish in the Harborough district of south-east Leicestershire, bordering Northamptonshire and Rutland. It is situated 6.7 miles (11 km) northeast of Market Harborough and 5 miles (7.5 km) southwest of Uppingham on the north side of the Welland valley. Nearby villages are Bringhurst, Great Easton and Nevill Holt. The church of St James in Drayton is one of the smallest churches in England.

== History ==
The village's name means 'farm/settlement used to carry portage' or 'farm/settlement used as a dragging place'.

Drayton grew up around an oval green of which the present green is the north-western end. West of the green, Drayton House is a tall red-brick structure, built in 1851–52 for Bryan Ward, a tenant of the Rockingham estate. South of the road to Great Easton the present Manor House Farm, or College Farm, was built c. 1870–80, probably for a relative of Lord Sondes, whose arms it carries. Its cart shed, a dilapidated ironstone structure retaining several stone-mullioned windows, was once a large house carrying the inscription 'H.N. 1651 T.W.' on a stone now built into the wall of the field behind. This was probably the chief messuage of the manor belonging to Henry Nevill and occupied by his tenants, the Watson family. The older houses in the village are of ironstone and include a thatched cottage south of Drayton House in which part of a cruck blade has been re-used as a principal rafter. A mutilated cruck truss is visible in a derelict stone cottage north of the road to Easton. The former Plough Inn is a stone building, partly thatched, of which the older portions probably date from the 17th century. A stone cottage on the road to Easton has a tablet of 1791, a date at which ironstone was evidently still in general use. The village contains several 19th-century brick cottages, including a row dated 1870. There are two pairs of council houses on the Great Easton road built after the First World War and three pairs on the road to Nevill Holt, built in 1950. The village hall, given by Mr Webb of Drayton House, is a wooden structure which was opened in 1925. It was renovated in 2019 after falling into disrepair.

The present civil parishes of Drayton and Great Easton were formerly part of the ancient parish of Bringhurst which possesses the mother church of St James church in Drayton. In 1086 the manor of Easton, which included the greater part of Bringhurst parish, belonged to the Abbey of Peterborough. The only portions of Bringhurst parish not controlled by the abbey were Drayton and the lost medieval village of Prestgrave. Land in these places, which was omitted from the Domesday Survey, came under the lordship of the Bassets of Weldon (Northants). At the time of the 1381 poll tax 133 persons were listed in Easton, 43 in Drayton, 26 in Bringhurst, an order of size that has since been maintained. In 1563 there were 70 households in Easton and 21 in Bringhurst and Drayton combined. At the 2011 Census, Drayton had 68 households and a population of 190.

== Conservation area ==
Drayton is one of 62 conservation areas within the Harborough District of Leicestershire. The Conservation Area embraces the area of the village around the village green together with the older part of the village along the road to Great Easton. Blocks of later development on the Great Easton Road and the Nevill Holt Road are excluded as the style of buildings does not contribute to the traditional feel of the village. The Conservation Area includes the traditional and newer buildings around the green and along Hall Lane and the main street towards Great Easton. Visually the most dominant part of the Conservation Area is around the open space of the village green which gives cohesion to the settlement. From the Medbourne Road the entrance to this open area is sudden and is firmly defined by a former farmhouse and its agricultural buildings. These extend partially along one side of the triangular Green. Open roads run on each of the three sides of the green in whose centre is the tiny single-cell Church of St James.

== Church of St James ==
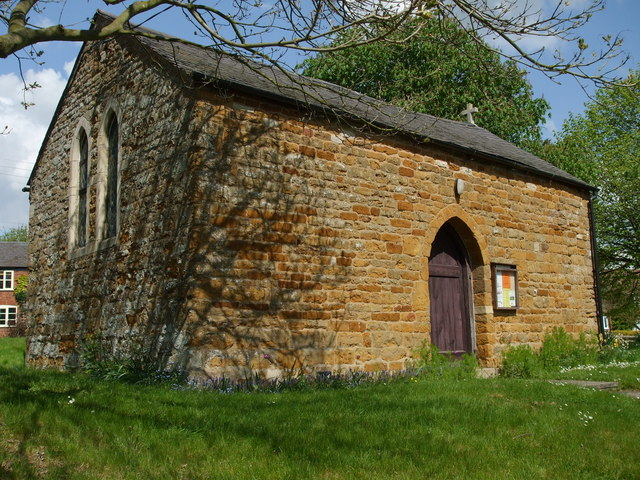
Church of St James

The church of St James stands on the green in Drayton and was listed as being Grade II on 7 December 1966. It is a single room built of stone and roofed with slate, constructed on the site of the former chapel which fell out of religious use in the 18th century and had been converted into a bake-house by 1794. In 1878, George Lewis Watson of Rockingham Castle bought the building and proceeded to remodel it throughout 1878-79 into a mission church. The door is in the centre of the south side; the east end has one, and the west end two, lancet windows. A bell on a bracket projects from the east end. A large semi-circular arch internally suggests that it was of 12th century origin. It is said to be Leicestershire's smallest consecrated church.
