= James Arthur Harley =

James Arthur Harley (15 May 1873 – 12 May 1943) was an Antiguan-born clergyman and local politician. After extensive education in the United States and England, he became a curate and priest in the Church of England. In later life he was a member of Shepshed Urban Council, from 1927 to 1930 as a Labour Party member, and from 1932 until 1943 as an Independent.

== Early life and church work ==
Harley was born on 15 May 1873 to Henry James Harley and Eleanora Josephine Lake. His father is assumed to be a landlord, and in 1891 he attended Micro Training College in Antigua. Harley studied Law and Classics at Howard University in Washington, D.C. and studied for a year at Yale University before moving to Harvard University to study Semitic Languages and history where he graduated magna cum laude. At Harvard he was a debator for their championship team and won prizes for excellence in English Composition. During his time there, he also became friends with Alain Locke, who he had known since his time at Harvard University and whom he would later enter Jesus College with. He later matriculated at Jesus College, Oxford to study Theology and Anthropology. His research work was on Japanese Shintoism and its rationale. In 1909 he started working as the curate in Shepshed. In 1911 he became an ordained Anglican priest and was sent to Deal, Kent. Afterward, he did a curacy in Chislet near Canterbury, but he left due to a feud over his stipend to St. Leonard near Chislet. Harley served in munitions during the First World War and returned to his curacy in Shepshed after the war ended.

== Personal life ==
He married Washington-born Josephine Maritcha Lawson in Oxford on 1 July 1910, although they separated soon after.
