= Iveshead School =

Location
- Forest Street; Shepshed, Leicestershire, LE12 9DB; England; 52°46′26″N 1°17′00″W

Information
- Type: Academy
- Motto: Respect, Enrich, Succeed
- Established: September 2017
- Local authority: Leicestershire
- Trust: Mowbray Education Trust
- Department for Education URN: 149271 Tables
- Ofsted: Reports
- Headteacher: Judith Johnson
- Gender: Coeducational
- Age: 11 to 19
- Website: http://www.ivesheadschool.org/

Iveshead School is a coeducational secondary school and sixth form situated within the town of Shepshed, Leicestershire, England.

It was formed in September 2017 through the merger of Hind Leys Community College and Shepshed High School. In 2021/2022, the original school building was sold to St. Botolph’s Primary School, a school that was located on the same campus. The staff, students and others moved into the combined school, merging the two while the building was rebuilt and had extensions added, considering there was not enough room. The school takes in students from a variety of areas including Shepshed, Loughborough, Belton, Kegworth, Long Whatton, Diseworth, Melton Mowbray and Castle Donington.

Previously a community school administered by Leicestershire County Council, in December 2022 Iveshead School converted to academy status. The school is now sponsored by the Mowbray Education Trust.

The school also provides a much wider range of services to the local community. Enclosed within the school is a crèche, complemented by the Shepshed toy library situated nearby. D In the evenings, it also provides the necessary facilities in order to host various clubs and societies ranging from sports to lessons in a foreign language. Situated near the school is also a local swimming pool used for P.E. Lessons.
