= John Beaumont (judge) =

Arms of Beaumont: Azure semé of fleurs-de-lis, a lion rampant or

John Beaumont (fl. 1550) of Grace Dieu in the parish of Belton in Leicestershire, England, was a judge and Master of the Rolls.

== Origins ==
He was the great-grandson of Sir Thomas Beaumont, of Bachuile, in Normandy, and great-great-grandson of John Beaumont, 4th Baron Beaumont (1361–1396), Knight of the Garter. The Beaumont barony had already fallen into abeyance in his time through the death of the 7th baron and 2nd viscount without issue in 1507. The viscounty then became extinct. The sixth baron had been distinguished as the first viscount ever created in England.

== Life ==
The earliest mention of John Beaumont appears to be a memorandum in the books of the corporation of Leicester, under date 1529–30, to the following effect: 'Agreed to give to John Beaumont, gent., 6s. 8d. fee to answer in such causes as the town shall need and require". In 1534, on the abbot of Leicester subscribing to the king's spiritual supremacy, a commission was appointed to take an ecclesiastical survey of the county, and Beaumont was placed thereon. In 1537 he was appointed reader at the Inner Temple, and in 1543 double reader (duplex lector), as a person appointed for the second time was then called. In 1547 he was elected treasurer of that society. His name is not to be found in the year books of Henry VII's reign, nor in any of the reports belonging to the reign of Edward VI.

In 1550 he was appointed Recorder of Leicester, and in the same year Master of the Rolls, in succession to Sir Robert Southwell. In this capacity he was commissioned to hear causes for Lord Chancellor Rich (26 November 1551) and for Lord Chancellor Goodrich (21 January 1552). He had not, however, long sat on the bench before he abused his position for his own advantage in the grossest possible manner.

He concluded a corrupt bargain, known to lawyers as champerty, with Lady Anne Powis, who was suing in his court to recover possession of land to which she claimed to be entitled from Charles Brandon, Duke of Suffolk, by which Lady Anne Powis agreed to sell the benefit of her suit, if she should be successful, to the judge for a sum of money. The selling of titles by persons not having possession of the lands was, even as between private individuals, a corrupt practice by English law, and a statute of Henry VIII renders either party to the contract liable to forfeit the full value of the lands. Beaumont, however, did not stop short at champerty. He endeavoured to corroborate Lady Powis's title by forging the signature of the late Duke of Suffolk to a deed by which that nobleman purported to grant the lands in question to the lady. He was also guilty of appropriating to his own use funds belonging to the royal revenues coming into his hands in his capacity of judge of the court of wards and liveries (established by Henry Viii in 1540-41) to the amount of £20,871 18s and 8d, and of concealing a felony committed by his servant.

On 9 February, when he had been in office little more than a year, he was arrested on these charges and put in prison. He subsequently (4 June) admitted their truth, but retracted his confession on the 16th, only again to acknowledge his guilt on the 20th. Of that, however, there appears to have been no doubt from the first. His successor, Sir Robert Bowes, was nominated as early as 10 May. Beaumont formally surrendered his office, and admitted his defalcations on 28 May, and by the same document assigned all his manors, lands, goods and chattels, with the issues and profits of the same, to the king in satisfaction of his claims. On 4 June he acknowledged a fine of his lands, which were entailed upon himself and his wife, and signed a covenant to surrender his goods.

By what may have been either a curious oversight or an intentional act of grace, his wife was not made a party to the fine, and on Beaumont's death her estate tail, never having been barred, "survived" to her. She entered within five years thereafter upon the estate of Grace Dieu in Leicestershire, which Henry, Earl of Huntingdon, to whom in 1553 it had been granted by the king, released to her. By this lady, Elizabeth Hastings, daughter of Sir William Hastings, a younger son of William Hastings, 1st Baron Hastings, Beaumont had had two sons. The elder was Francis Beaumont (MP) a Judge whose son was playwright Francis Beaumont (died 1616); the younger, Henry, of whom nothing seems to be known except that he was a member of the Inner Temple, died at the early age of forty-two, and was buried in the Temple Church. His daughter elizabeth married William Vaux, 3rd Baron Vaux of Harrowden

The family acquired further distinction in a legal aspect by a celebrated case decided in Lord Coke's time between Barbara, daughter of Sir Henry Beaumont, the eldest son of Sir Francis, the judge, and John, the second son of Sir Francis. Sir Henry had settled Grace Dieu upon his heirs male, with remainder to his brother John and his heirs male. Accordingly, on Sir Henry's death, John took possession, but Barbara being of tender years and ward to the king (James I) the question whether she was not entitled as tenant in tail under the original settlement was raised and elaborately argued with the result that a new point in the law of settlement was established, viz. that the barring of an entail by one of two joint tenants in tail, while it is inoperative to put an end to the entail, is yet sufficient to preclude the issue from inheriting. (Note: Nicolas's Hist. Peerage of England) (Note: Nichols's County of Leicester, i. part ii. 274, 391, 393) (Note: Dugdale's Orig. 164, 170, 178) (Note: Dugdale's Chronicles Series, 89) (Note: Rot. Pat. 4 Edward VI, page 6, m. 24) (Note: Hardy's Catalogue of Lords Chancellors, 62) (Note: King Edward's Journal in Burnet's Hist. Ref. Church Eng. Appendix, under date 1552, 9 February, 4, 16, and 20 June) (Note: Hayward's Life of Edward VI in Kennet's Hist. ii. [319].)
