= Grace Dieu Manor =

Country house in Belton, Leicestershire, England

Coordinates: 52.757°N 1.353°W

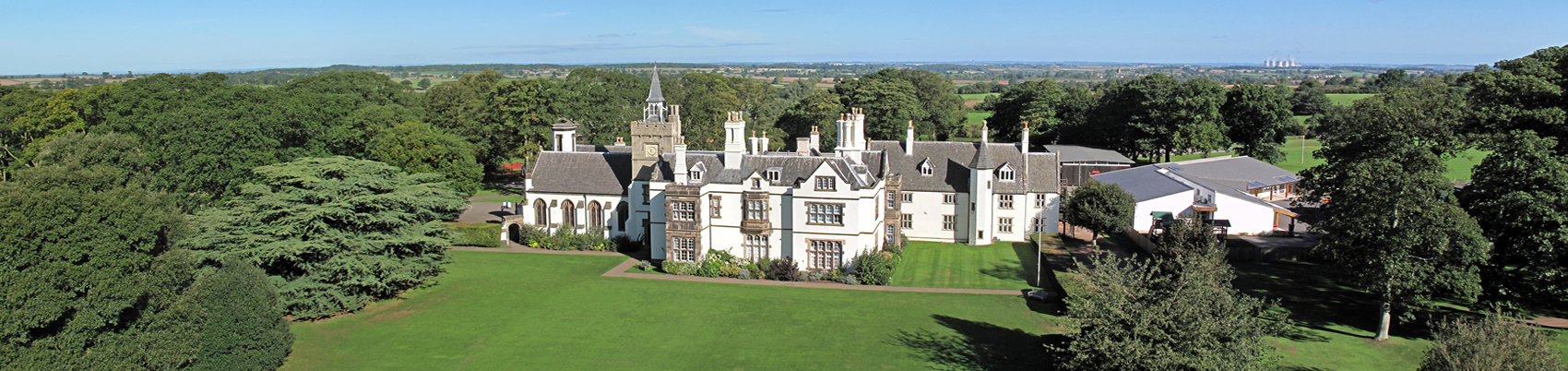
Grace Dieu Manor

Grace Dieu Manor is a 19th-century country house near Thringstone in Leicestershire, England, occupied by Grace Dieu Manor School until 2020. It is a Grade II listed building.

== Early history ==
The house is named after the adjacent Grace Dieu Priory, a priory founded in 1240 by Roesia de Verdun for fourteen Augustinian nuns and a prioress. It was dissolved in 1540 and granted to Sir Humphrey Foster, who immediately conveyed it to John Beaumont (fl. 1550), Master of the Rolls, who made it his residence.

=== Beaumont ===
The descent in the Beaumont family was as follows:

- John Beaumont (fl. 1550), Master of the Rolls.
- Sir Francis Beaumont (d.1598) (son), a judge. His second son was the dramatist and poet Francis Beaumont, most famous for his collaborations with John Fletcher.
- Sir John Beaumont, 1st Baronet (c.1582/3 – April 1627) (eldest son), created the first of the Beaumont baronets of Grace Dieu in 1627.
- Sir John Beaumont, 2nd Baronet (1607–1643)
- Sir Thomas Beaumont, 3rd Baronet (1620–1686), after whose death the estate was sold to Sir Ambrose Phillipps (1637–1691)

=== Phillipps ===
Sir Ambrose Phillipps (1637–1691) purchased the estate following the death of the 3rd and last Beaumont baronet in 1686. Phillipps demolished most of the priory church in 1696. On the death of his eventual successor in 1796 the estate passed to his cousin Thomas March, who adopted the surname Phillipps in lieu of his patronymic.

== Present building ==
In 1833, Charles March Phillipps gave the manor of Grace Dieu to his son, Ambrose Lisle March Phillipps, following his marriage. Ambrose had converted to Roman Catholicism at an early age, and was an enthusiast for monasticism. His biographer Edmund Sheridan Purcell says his father had been "anxious to see him married and settled lest his religious fervour should induce him to make vows of celibacy, which he often spoke of as the highest life, and follow up by entering the cloister or ranks of the secular clergy" The old priory buildings having fallen into ruins, he set about building a new house to a design in a "Tudor" style by the London architect William Railton. It was built on higher ground, about 300 yards south of the priory ruins. There was a chapel attached, later enlarged by A. W. N. Pugin.

In 1842 Phillipps built another chapel, to Pugin's designs, about a mile from the house and set up a cross, 17 feet (5.2 m) tall, on a rock he named the Calvary. Between the chapel and the cross was a series of fourteen shrines, each containing a representation of a scene from Christ's passion. At the foot of the rock he built a village school, dedicated to St Aloysius. In around 1846, Pugin also added the mansion's east wing and stable court gateway. Sir Banister Fletcher made alterations in around 1900.

The manor was rented by Charles Booth and family from 1886 to the death of Mary Booth in 1939. Charles died there in 1916 at the age of 76. Mary oversaw much of the restoration work on the building in the early years of their stay.

The March Phillipps family, later March Phillipps de Lisle, owned the house until 1933, although their main residence was at the Garendon Hall they built at the former Garendon Abbey. Following the death of two of its heads in quick succession, the family needed to reduce its expenditure and so in 1885 moved out of Garendon into Grace Dieu Manor. A return to fortune allowed the family to return to Garendon once more in 1907, however. Finally in 1964 Garendon Hall was demolished and the family returned to Grace Dieu for a final time, selling the house within a decade. Grace Dieu Manor then became a Catholic school. The school was part of the educational trust of the Rosminian order.

In 1972 the family moved to Quenby Hall, but, following the collapse of the family cheese-making business, the family offered the Hall for sale.

== Current use ==
Grace Dieu Manor School closed in 2020. In 2022 the 66-acre site was sold to FCV International Football Academy by the Rosminians. FCV International Football Academy run FCV Grace Dieu who play in the United Counties League Division One
