= Castle Roche =

Ruined castle in County Louth, Ireland

Coordinates: 54.04646°N 6.488317°W

Montage of Castle Roche

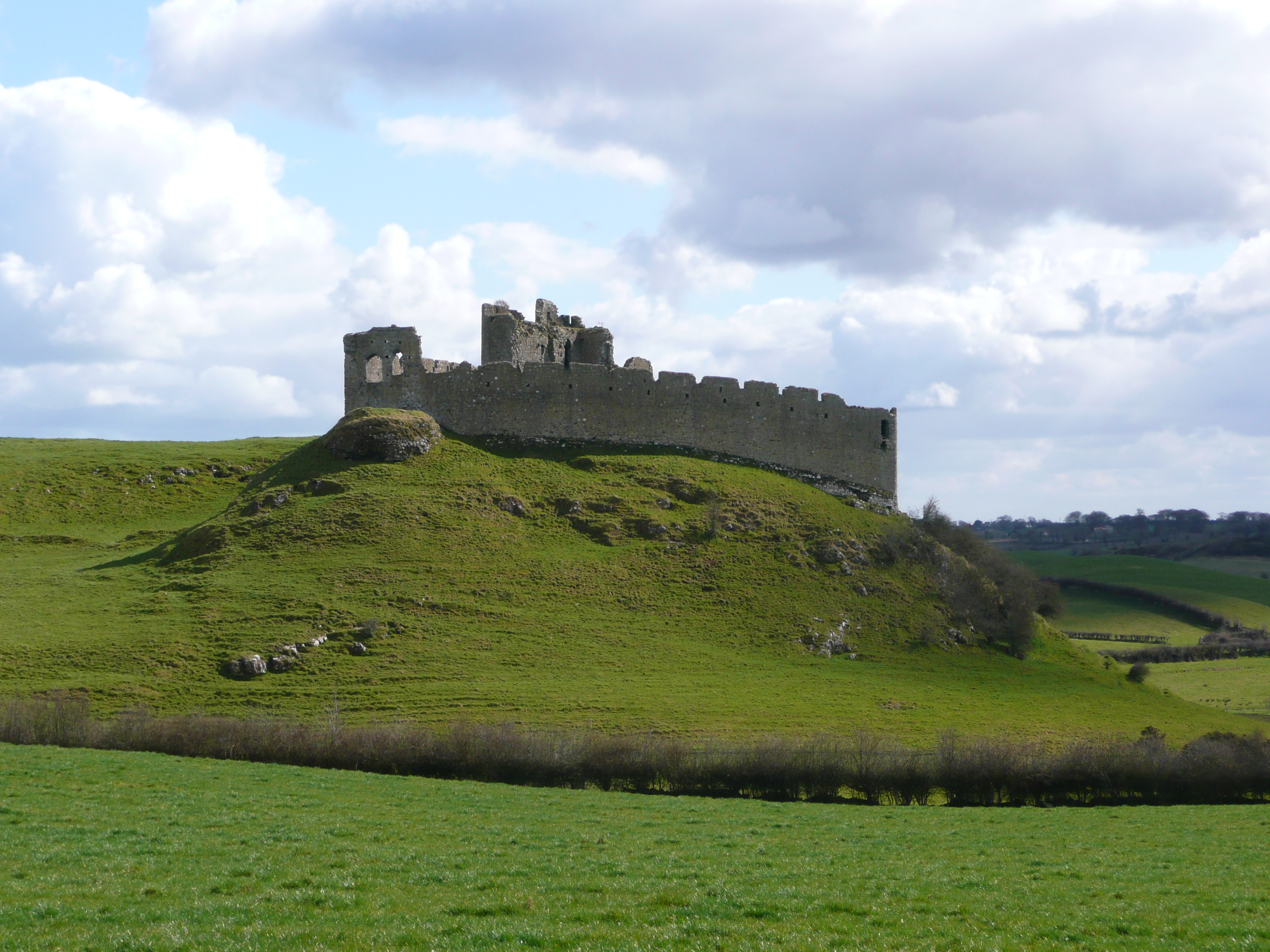
Castle Roche

Castle Roche (Irish: Dún Gall) is a Norman castle located some 10 km (7 miles) north-west of Dundalk, County Louth, Ireland. It was the seat of the de Verdun family (also spelt de Verdon), who built the castle in 1236.

It is built upon a large rocky outcrop and commands extensive views of the surrounding country. Together with a deep moat, its strong walls rendered it virtually impregnable. A secret passage once connected the castle to a round tower outpost.

St. Ronan's Well lies nearby.

== History ==
The de Verdun family of Alton Castle, Staffordshire, had a history in the region, Bertram de Verdun arriving as part of John's first expedition to Ireland in April 1185. By 1185 he had erected a manor house at Castletown Mount and subsequently obtained the town's charter in 1189.

Bertram's granddaughter Rohesia de Verdun from Alton, England, was married to Theobald le Botiller, 2nd Chief Butler of Ireland. After her husband’s sudden death whilst travelling in Poitou, France, she moved to her lands in Ireland. She immediately set about fortifying the land with a castle. A legend claims that her quick-tempered reputation deterred all potential architects; she offered her hand in marriage (and thereby a share in her wealth) to the man who would build the castle to her liking. The legend tells that after their wedding banquet in the newly completed castle, she invited her husband to the bridal suite and urged him to view their estate from the large bedroom window. Taking no chances with the castle’s secrets, she promptly pushed her new husband from the window, where he plummeted towards his death. The window was known thereafter as the Murder Window. Rohesia became a nun in Gracedieu Priory, Leicestershire, died there in 1247 and was buried in nearby Belton parish church, where her effigy may be seen. Although it is generally accepted that Rohesia originally commissioned the castle, much of it is thought to have been added by John, her son by Theobald. The name "Castle Roche" derives from its physical location – it was the castle of / on the 'Rock' ('roche' being old/Norman French for 'rock').

The site of the castle held a strategic position on the frontier between the (then) exclusively Gaelic province of Ulster and the Anglo-Norman territory known as The Pale, and controlled the pass into what is now South Armagh. The de Verdun family held the site for many years. Nicholas de Verdun (who died in 1316), a younger brother of Theobald II de Verdun, was in charge during the Bruce Invasion by Edward Bruce, brother of Robert the Bruce. A hosting of all English forces in Ireland took place here in 1561 but the castle was finally laid to ruin in 1641, during the Cromwellian conquest of Ireland.
