= Garendon Abbey =

Former Cistercian abbey in England

- Location within Leicestershire

Monastery information
- Order: Cistercian
- Established: 1133
- Disestablished: 1536

People
- Founder: Robert de Beaumont, 2nd Earl of Leicester

Site
- Location: Between Shepshed and Loughborough, in Leicestershire, England
- Coordinates: 52.7743°N 1.2585°W
- Visible remains: Foundations of Chapter house visible but on private land.

Garendon Abbey was a Cistercian abbey located between Shepshed and Loughborough, in Leicestershire, United Kingdom.

== History ==
Garendon was founded by Robert de Beaumont, 2nd Earl of Leicester, in 1133, and was probably a daughter house of Waverley Abbey in Surrey. Garendon was one of a number of religious establishments founded or patronised by Robert. He endowed the abbey with 690 acres of land in Garendon, a Burgage tenement in Leicester and land at Dishley, Shepshed and Ringolthorpe.

Ranulf le Meschin, 3rd Earl of Chester (d. 1129), gave the abbey the right to graze all their livestock in Barrow upon Soar, the deer park excepted. He also confirmed the gifts made to Garendon in Holywell Hall (“Haliwellhawe”) by Robert de Jorz, William de Jorz, and Thomas le Despenser. He is further believed to have been the donor of ten bovates in Burton on the Wolds, Leicestershire, of the fee of Asketil de Berges. Later, his descendant Hugh Despenser is known to have donated three virgates to Garendon.

Within a century of foundation, the abbey gained lands at Burton on the Wolds, Eastwell, Ibstock, Stanton under Bardon and Welby, all in Leicestershire; land at Costock, Nottinghamshire; and at Heathcote, Derbyshire. Monastic granges were then developed near the abbey, and at Burton on the Wolds, Dishley, Goadby, Ibstock, Ringolthorpe, Stanton Under Bardon and Welby in Leicestershire; at Costock and Rempstone, Nottinghamshire; and in the Peak District, in Derbyshire. Through these granges the abbey conducted sheep farming "on a considerable scale".

The abbey also gained two daughter houses, Biddlesden Abbey in Buckinghamshire, and Bordesley Abbey in Worcestershire.

By the end of the 13th century, the abbey had fallen on hard times, acquiring debts of £120.In 1295 King Edward I had appointed a "special keeper" to administer the abbey's finance and deal with its debt problems.

Despite the abbey's large endowments, its finances seem never to have recovered. In 1535 the abbey was recorded as having an annual income of £100. 18s. 10½d, and that "the large old monastery was partly ruinous". It was dissolved under Henry VIII, though not for charitable reasons, along with the smaller monasteries (those with annual incomes of under £200) in 1536, with the abbot being granted a pension of £30 a year.

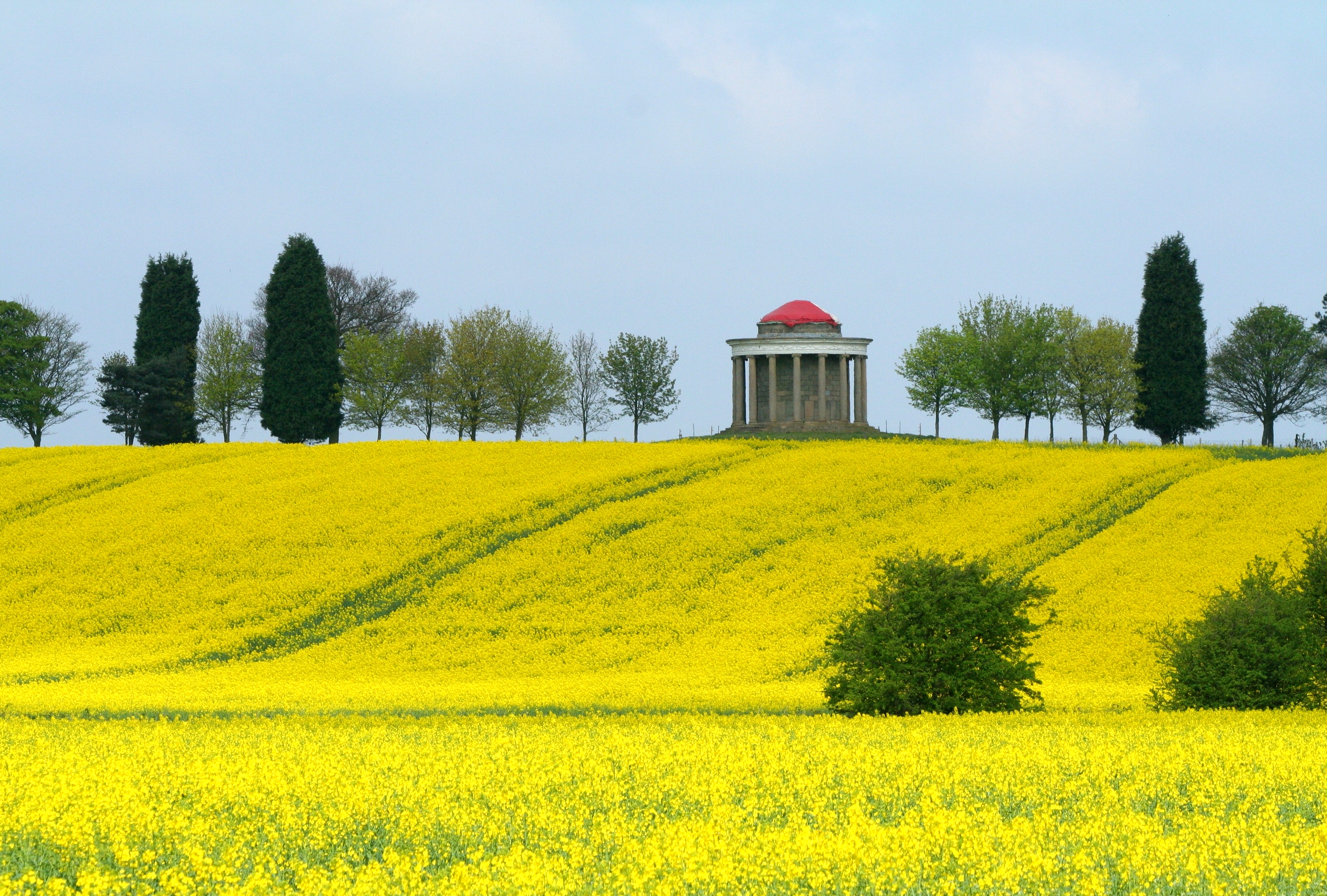
"The Temple of Venus": one of the Palladian follies built when the abbey's former estate was landscaped

=== After Dissolution ===
After the dissolution, the abbey church was completely demolished. The surrounding monastic buildings, already partially ruined, were then allowed to further disintegrate.

The Crown sold the abbey to Thomas Manners, 1st Earl of Rutland, for £2,356 5s 10d. The earl then constructed a house on the abbey site, known as Garendon House. The house was owned by the Earls of Rutland until 1632, when it became part of the dowry of Lady Katherine Manners (daughter of the 6th Earl of Rutland) at her marriage to George Villiers, 1st Duke of Buckingham. In 1640 the estate was valued at £5,648 and was reported to contain 13,350 trees.

In 1684 the 2nd Duke of Buckingham sold the house to Sir Ambrose Phillipps (a successful lawyer) for £28,000. Sir Ambrose and his son William did little to the house; his grandson, another Ambrose Phillipps, an accomplished gentleman architect inspired by his Grand Tour of France and Italy, started to change the house and the former abbey estate. Beginning in 1734, Ambrose landscaped the surrounding parkland and built to his own designs, several Palladian follies, which still exist. Ambrose later began to redesign, extend and rebuild Garendon House in the Palladian style, developing it into what would be known as Garendon Hall. However, the work remained unfinished in 1737 when Ambrose died childless; it was completed by the heir to the estate, his brother Samuel.

Following Ambrose's death, the family was left with a difficult financial situation and needed to tighten its belt. In 1885 they moved out of Garendon and into Grace Dieu Manor, though a return to fortune allowed them to return to Garendon once more in 1907.

The house was used and heavily damaged by the army during the Second World War. The ever-increasing cost of running and maintaining the building, coupled with threats to the house's parkland from the urban sprawl of Loughborough and the construction of the M1 Motorway, which cut directly through the park, it was decided the house was to be demolished. This happened in June 1964, with the house being deliberately set fire to first in order to provide practice and training for the local fire brigade. The house was reduced to rubble which was then used in the construction of the nearby M1.

In 1964 the family returned for a final time to Grace Dieu Manor, but sold that house within a decade. The building would become a Catholic school. In 1972 the family moved to Quenby Hall, but following the collapse of the family cheese-making business, the family has been forced to offer Quenby Hall for sale (it has been for sale since 2012).

=== Abbots of Garendon Abbey ===
- Robert, occurs 1144–5.
- Geoffrey, occurs 1147.
- Thurstan, occurs between 1155 and 1164. Died 1189.
- William, elected 1189, resigned 1195.
- Reynold, elected 1195.
- Adam, resigned 1219.
- William, resigned 1226.
- Reynold, elected 1226, resigned 1234.
- Andrew, elected 1234.
- Simon, occurs 1251.
- Robert, occurs 1275.
- Roger, occurs before 1281.
- Eustace, occurs 1290 and 1294.
- John, occurs from 1299 to 1330.
- Walter Seynt Croys, occurs 1340, resigned in, or shortly before, 1350.
- John, occurs 1360.
- Thomas of Lughtburgh, elected 1361.
- John, occurs 1406.
- Richard, occurs early 15th century.
- John Scarburghe, occurs 1418.
- John of London, occurs 1439.
- John Clareborough, occurs 1487.
- William Leycestre, occurs 1490.
- Thomas, occurs 1513.
- Thomas Siston, occurs 1535.
- Randolph Arnold, last abbot.

== Burials ==
- Saer de Quincy, 1st Earl of Winchester

== Layout and remains ==
The abbey is thought to have been quite large: with the complex occupying an area of around 70m x 80m. St Bernard of Clairvaux, one of the founders of the Cistercian Order, disapproved of ornate church architecture and sculpture, which was subsequently banned by the order. Cistercian architecture and decoration was thus often very simple.

Following the dissolution of the abbey, Garendon Hall (aligned north–south) was built straddling the location of the former abbey church (which was aligned east–west). The cellars of the hall incorporated 13th-century stonework which may have been original. The cellars also contained a pair of "stone lined wells".

Following the demolition of Garendon Hall, the site of the former abbey was able to be excavated. Excavations undertaken in 1966-68 located the foundations of the former abbey's chapter house and dormitory. The excavation also located the remains of the chapels attached to the transepts of the abbey church.

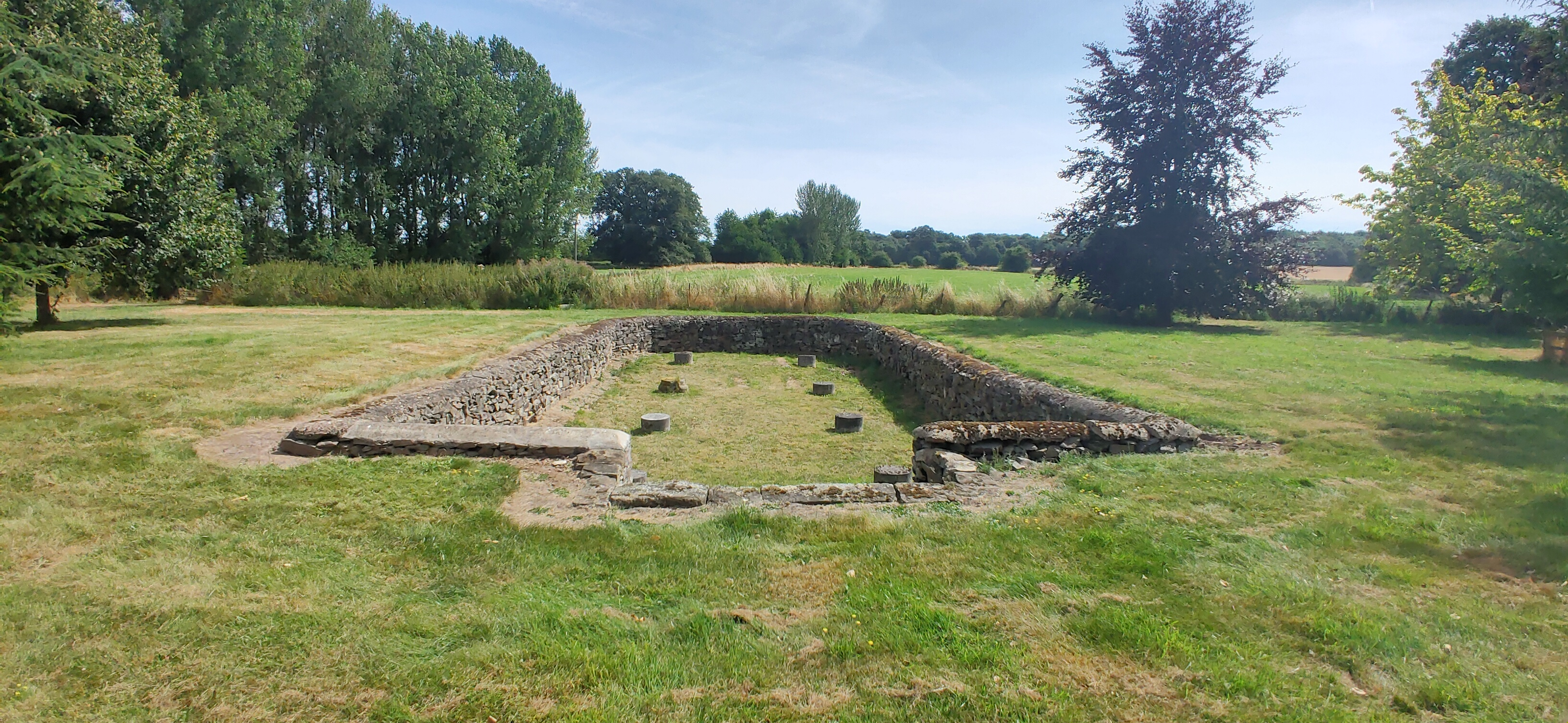
Garendon Abbey Chapter House foundations

It was also discovered that the abbey's drain was used as part of the sewage system of Garendon Hall.

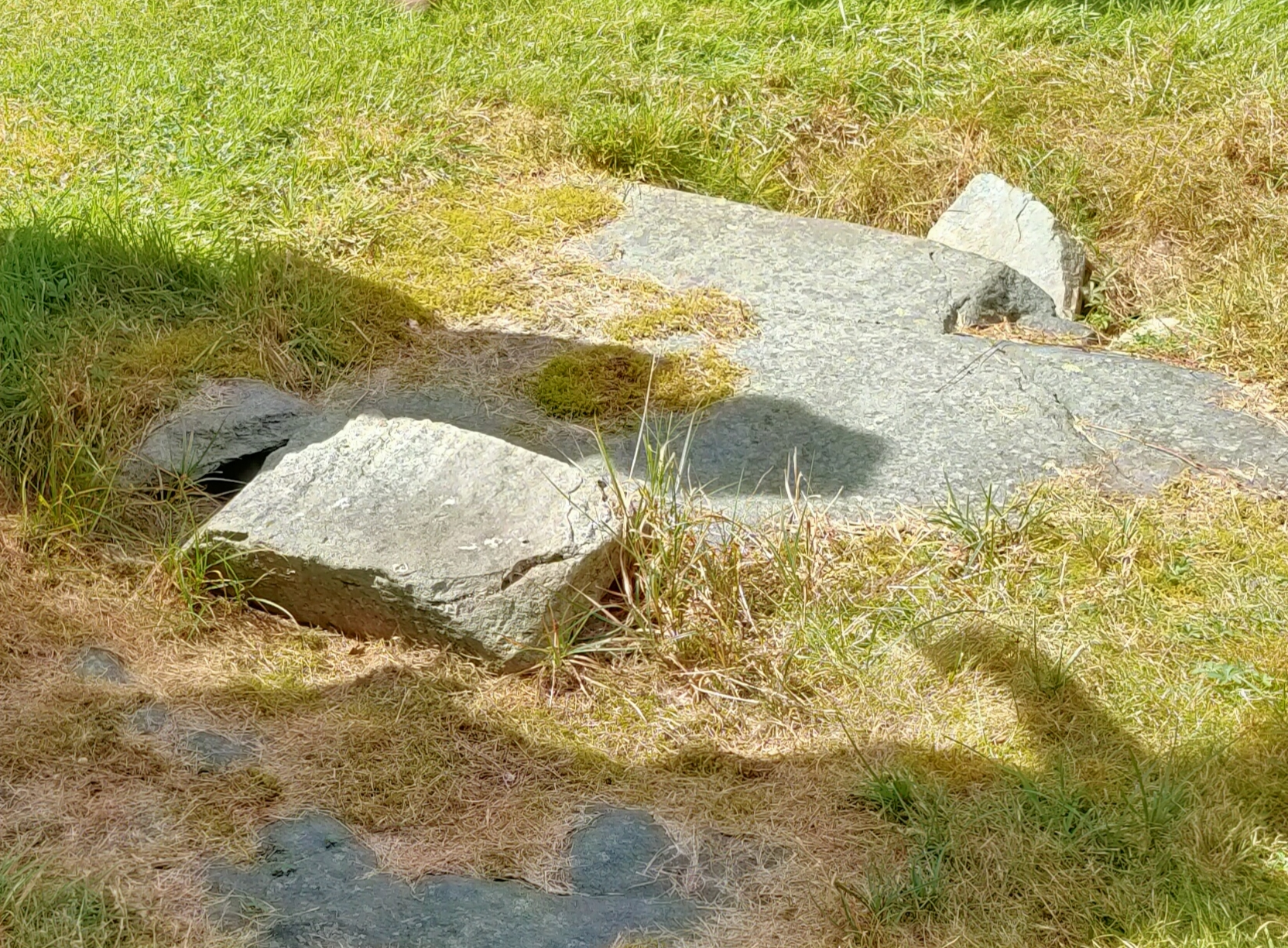
Garendon Abbey remains of drain

The remains of the chapter house and drains were left exposed, although are on private property. The ruins, together with surrounding area and associated monastic fishponds are Scheduled Ancient Monuments.

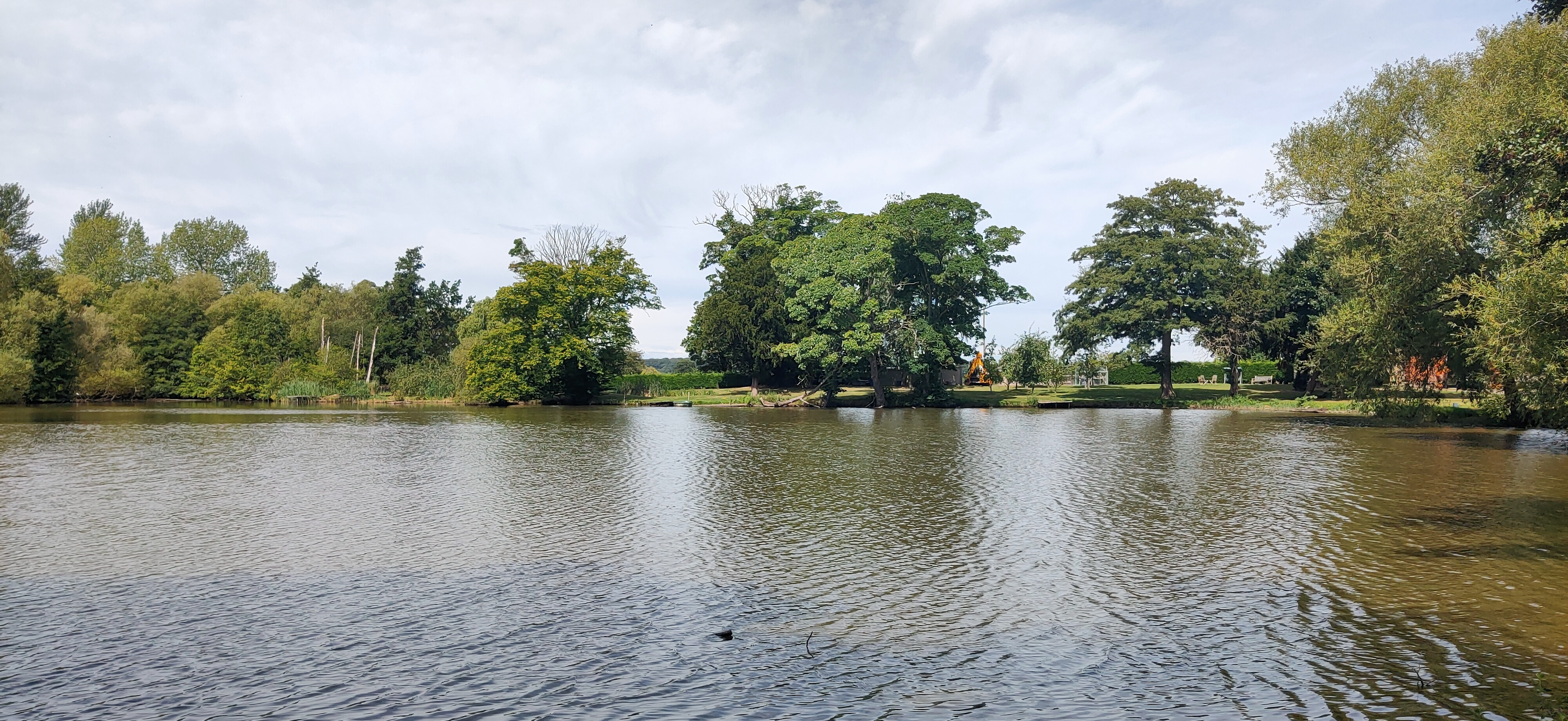
Garendon Abbey monastic fish ponds

== See also ==
- Garendon Hall
