= Ambrose Phillipps =

English landowner and politician

Ambrose Phillipps (c. 1707 – 6 November 1737), of Garendon Park, Leicestershire, was an English landowner and Tory politician who sat in the House of Commons from 1734 to 1737. He was also an amateur architect.

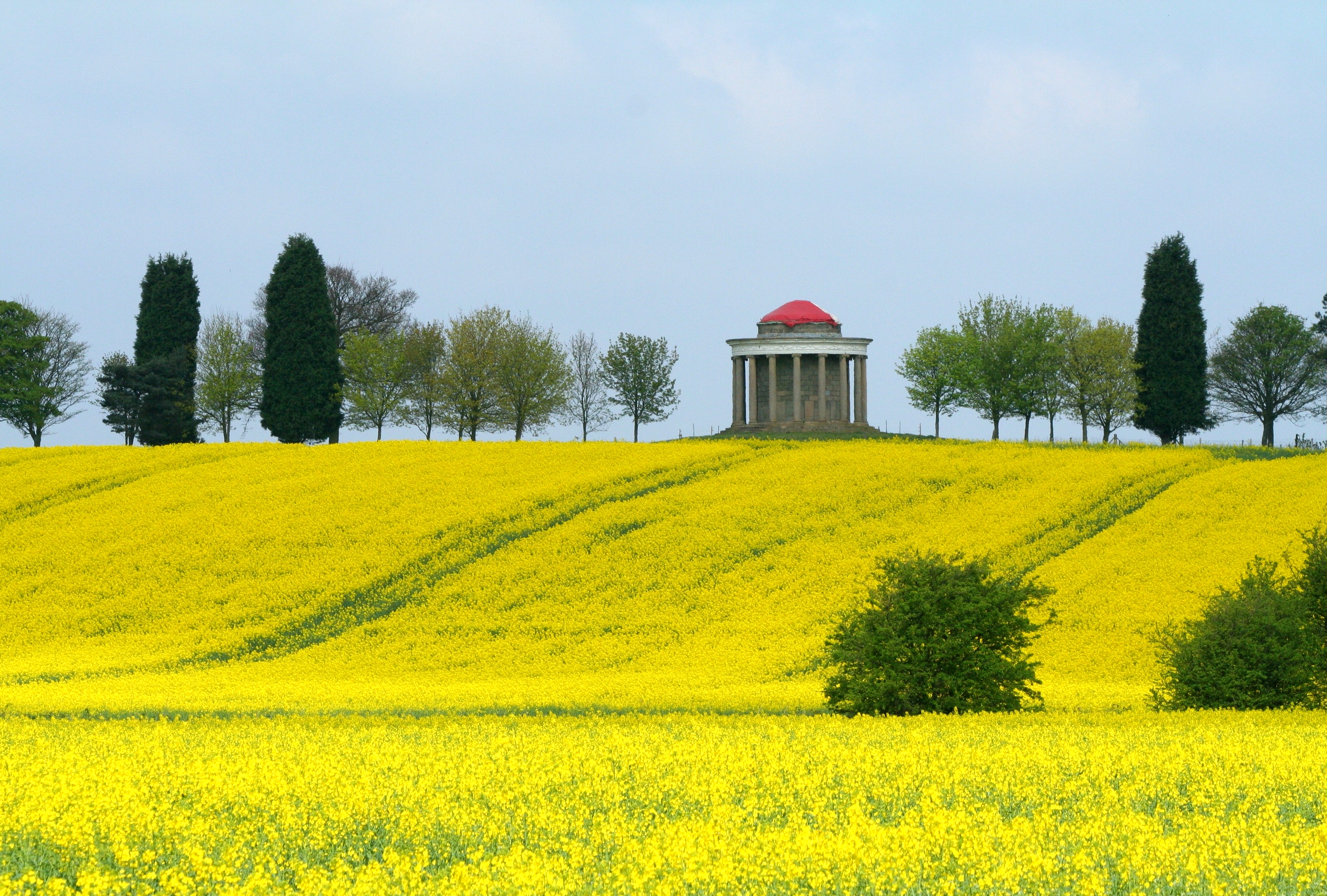
Temple of Venus at Garendon, designed by Phillipps

Phillipps was the eldest son of William Phillipps of Garendon and his wife Jane Dashwood, daughter of Sir Samuel Dashwood, MP, who was Lord mayor of London in 1703. He matriculated at Magdalen College, Oxford on 18 July 1724, aged 16. He succeeded his father to Garendon in 1729 and then travelled in France and Italy, where he acquired an interest in architecture. He applied his knowledge of architecture in designing the gardens and extensions of Garendon Hall. He was an early member of the Society of Dilettanti in around 1732.

Phillipps was returned unopposed as Tory Member of Parliament (MP) for Leicestershire at a by-election on 5 February 1734, and was returned unopposed again at the 1734 British general election soon after. He voted against the Government on the repeal of the Septennial Act.

Phillipps died unmarried on 6 November 1737, aged 30. Garendon Hall was completed by his brother.

Parliament of Great Britain
| Preceded by Sir Clobery Noel, Bt; Lord William Manners | Member of Parliament for Leicestershire; 1734–1737; With: Lord William Manners to May 1734; Edward Smith from May 1734 | Succeeded by Lord Grey; Edward Smith |
