= Francis Beaumont (MP) =

Member of the Parliament of England

Arms of Beaumont: Azure semé of fleurs-de-lis, a lion rampant or

Francis Beaumont (died 1598) of Grace-Dieu in the parish of Belton in Leicestershire, was a judge.

== Origins ==
He was the eldest son of the judge John Beaumont, sometime Master of the Rolls, by his second wife Elizabeth Hastings, daughter of William Hastings, 1st Baron Hastings. His father was removed from the bench in 1552 for "scandalously abusing his position".

== Life ==
Nothing is recorded of his early education. He was a Fellow-Commoner of Peterhouse, Cambridge, when Queen Elizabeth I visited Cambridge University. No record survives of his matriculation nor of his having graduated. He studied law in the Inner Temple, was called to the bar, and practised with success and high reputation. In 1572 he was elected a Member of Parliament for Aldeburgh. In 1581 he was elected Autumn Reader of the Inner Temple. In 1589 he was called to the degree of Serjeant-at-Law and on 25 January 1592-3 was appointed a Judge of the Court of Common Pleas .

== Marriage and children ==
He married Anne Pierrepont, daughter of Sir George Pierrepont, knight, of Holme Pierrepont in Nottinghamshire, and widow of Thomas Thorold of Marston, Lincolnshire. By his wife, who predeceased him, he had three sons and one daughter as follows:

- Sir Henry Beaumont (1581–1605), who was knighted in 1603 and died aged 24; his daughter barbara married Wolstan Dixie, 1st Baronet
- Sir John Beaumont, 1st Baronet
- Francis Beaumont, the dramatist.
- Elizabeth Beaumont, wife of Sir Thomas Seyliard of Kent.

== Death ==
In 1598 Beaumont caught gaol fever (now believed to have been typhus) whilst presiding at the Assizes of the Northern Circuit, which was one of many so-called Black Assizes where disease spread from prisoners to attendees at court and caused widespread deaths within a few days. Beaumont died at home at Grace-Dieu on 22 April 1598, and was buried on 12 June following, with heraldic attendance, in the parish church of Belton.

== Legacy ==
William Burton, the historian of Leicestershire, who was 23 when Beaumont died, called him a "grave, learned, and reverend judge". (Note: Cooper's Athen. Cantab, ii. 246) (Note: Dyce's Beaumont and Fletcher's Works, i. xix, xxii, lxxxvii, lxxxxix) (Note: Introduction to Dr. Grosart's edition of the Poems of Sir John Beaumont in Fuller's Worthies Library (1869)) (Note: Cal. Chanc. Proc.temp. Eliz. i. 61) (Note: Coke's Reports, ix. 138) (Note: Foss's Judges of England, v. 408, 411, 414, 421, 456) (Note: Dugdale's Orig. Jurid. 166, 186) (Note: Chronicles Ser. 98) (Note: Nichols's Leicestershire, iii. 649, 655, 656, 666*, and pl. lxxvii. fig. 4) (Note: Originalia Eliz. page 3, r. 126) (Note: Strype's Annals, iii. 92) (Note: Talbot Papers, G. 472, 505, 529, H. 207) (Note: Willis's Not. Parliamentary. iii. (2) 95.)
