= Sir John Beaumont, 1st Baronet =

English poet

Arms of Beaumont: Azure semée of fleurs-de-lis, a lion rampant or

Sir John Beaumont, 1st Baronet (c.1582/3 – April 1627) of Grace Dieu in the parish of Belton in Leicestershire, England, was a poet best known for his work Bosworth Field (a poem about the Battle of Bosworth Field).

== Origins ==
He was born at Grace Dieu, near Thringstone in Leicestershire, the second son of the judge Sir Francis Beaumont (d.1598) by his wife Anne Pierrepont. His younger brother was the dramatist Francis Beaumont.

== Career ==
John matriculated at Broadgates Hall (later Pembroke College) in the University of Oxford on 4 February 1596/1597, entered as a gentleman commoner. He was admitted to the Inner Temple in 1598 or 1600. The death in 1605 of his elder brother, Sir Henry Beaumont, made John the head of the Beaumont family, and he is thought to have returned to Grace-Dieu to manage the family estates. He was a Roman Catholic and together with his wife was fined for recusancy in 1607, and in 1625 was again in trouble on that account.

He began to write verse early and in 1602, at the age of nineteen, he published anonymously his Metamorphosis of Tabacco, written in very smooth couplets, in which he addressed Michael Drayton as his loving friend. After long retirement Beaumont was persuaded by the Duke of Buckingham to return to society. He attended court and on 31 January 1626/1627 was created by the king a Baronet "of Gracedieu, in Belton, County Leicester", in the Baronetage of England.

== Marriage and children ==
Beaumont lived in Leicestershire for many years as a bachelor, before eventually marrying Elizabeth Fortescue (died after 16 April 1652), daughter of John Fortescue and paternal granddaughter of one of the only two married daughters of Sir Geoffrey Pole and Constance Pakenham. By his wife he had four sons, including:

- Sir John Beaumont, 2nd Baronet (d.1643), eldest son and heir, killed at the Siege of Gloucester. He was considered one of the most athletic men of his time. He published some of his father's poems, and wrote an enthusiastic elegy on him.
- Gervaise Beaumont, who died in childhood. The circumstances of his death are recorded in one of his father's most touching poems.
- Thomas Beaumont, 3rd Baronet

== Death and burial ==
He died in April 1627 and was buried on 19 April 1627 in Westminster Abbey. He died intestate and his estate was administered on 3 January 1628/1629. He was succeeded in the baronetcy by his eldest son, Sir John Beaumont, 2nd Baronet.

== Works ==
Beaumont's major work is a poem in twelve books, entitled The Crown of Thornes, which was greatly admired in manuscript by Henry Wriothesley, 3rd Earl of Southampton and others. Though lost for centuries, scholars have established that a long poem in twelve books contained in a manuscript in the British Library was indeed Beaumont's lost major work. In 1629 the 2nd Baronet published a volume of his father's works entitled Bosworth Field; with a taste of the variety of other Poems left by Sir John Beaumont. No more tastes were ever vouchsafed, so Beaumont's reputation rests on this the juvenile Metamorphosis of Tobacco. Beaumont's favoured medium was the heroic couplet. Bosworth Field, the scene of the battle described in Beaumont's principal poem, lay close to the poet's residence of Grace-Dieu. He always wrote with a remarkable smoothness, which marks him, with Edmund Waller and George Sandys, as one of the pioneers of the classic reformation of English verse.

The poems of Sir John Beaumont were included in Alexander Chalmers's English Poets, vol. vi (1810). An edition, with memorial introduction and notes, was included (1869) in Dr AB Grosart's Fuller Worthies Library; and the Metamorphosis of Tobacco was included in JP Collier's Illustrations of Early English Popular Literature, vol. i. (1863).

Baronetage of England
New creation	Baronet (of Grace Dieu); 1627	Succeeded by John Beaumont
