= Church of St John the Baptist, Belton =

Church in Belton, Leicestershire

Coordinates: 52°46′59″N 1°20′16″W

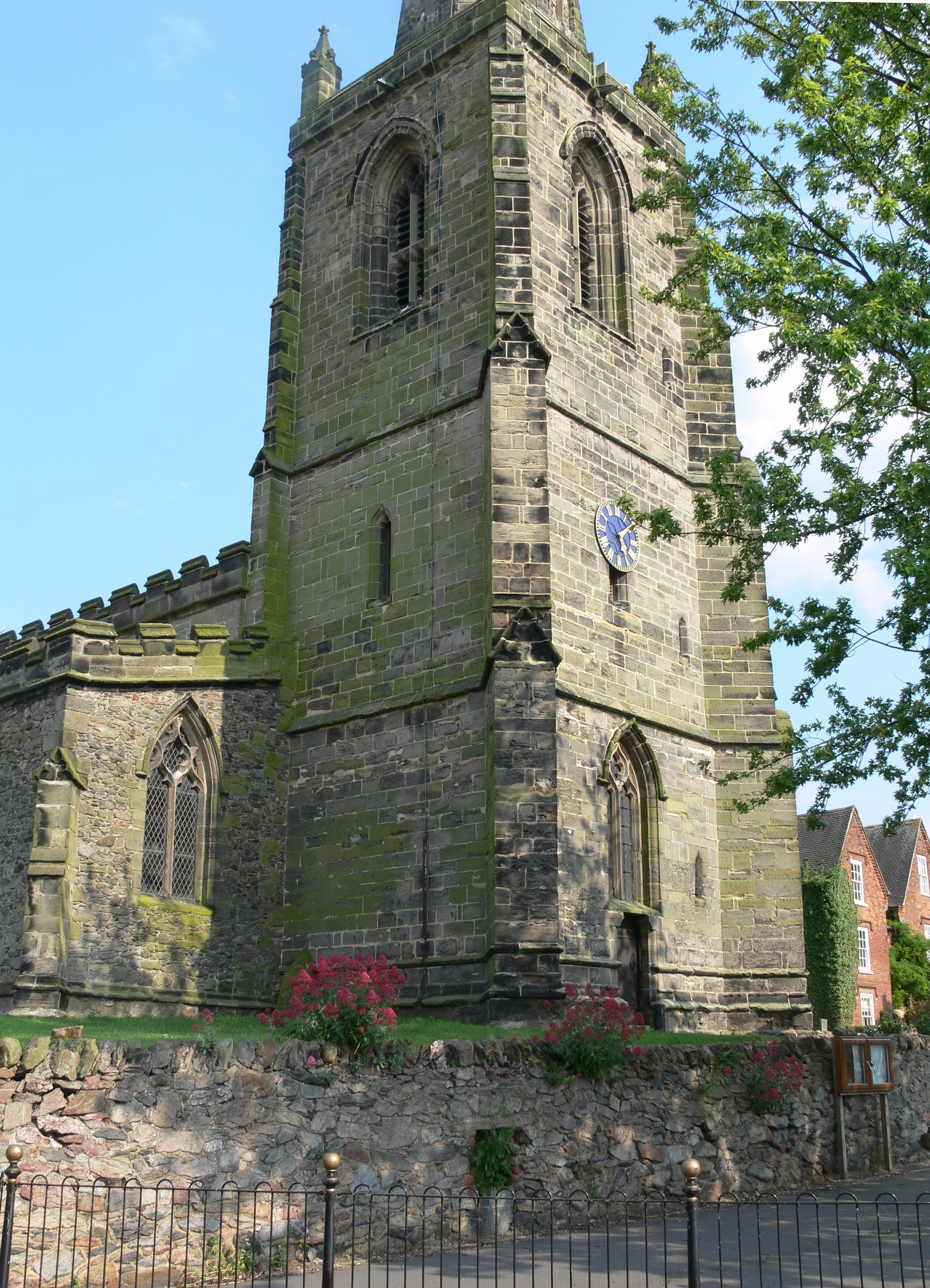
- Church of St John the Baptist, Belton
- Denomination: Church of England

History
- Dedication: St John the Baptist

Administration
- Diocese: Leicester
- Archdeaconry: Loughborough
- Parish: Belton, Leicestershire

Clergy
- Rector: Lauretta Wilson

The Church of St John the Baptist is a church in Belton, Leicestershire. It is a Grade II* listed building.

== History ==
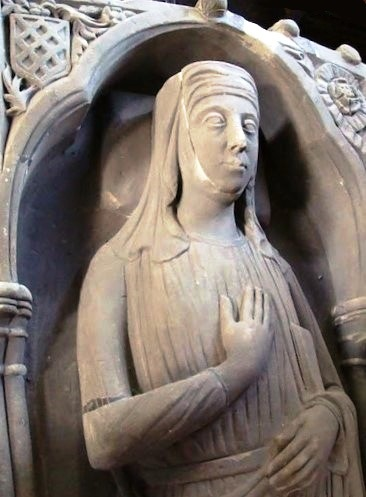
Tomb effigy of Roesia de Verdun

The church is built in the Early English style and consists of a nave, clerestory, south porch, tower with spire and 3 bells, and a chancel. Each of the nave arcades have 4 arches and are supported on octagonal piers with moulded capitals. The chancel screen was restored in memory of Miss Louisa Blakeney in 1894. The chancel also has a piscina as does the east end of the aisles.

In the north aisle, there is a restored upper slab belonging to the altar tomb of Roesia de Verdun (died 1247), who founded nearby Grace Dieu Priory. The south aisle has a memorial window to Charles Thompson. The church was restored in 1850 and 1877.
