= Leicestershire Deserted Villages and Lost Places =

See also Leicestershire section of List of lost settlements in the United Kingdom

The identification of Deserted Villages and Lost Places in Leicestershire owes much to the pioneering work of William George Hoskins during his time at the University of Leicester.

== Beginnings ==
Hoskins prepared his first list of such places for publication by the Leicestershire Archaeological Society in 1945. This list was updated in his book Essays in Leicestershire History published in 1950. In 1956 he published in the Transactions an account of seven of the key sites, Baggrave, Cold Newton, Great Stretton, Hamilton, Ingarsby, Lowesby and Quenby. He wrote numerous other articles and contributed to the Victoria History of the County of Leicester on the theme of deserted villages. He actively promoted research on them at the university and at part-time courses at the Vaughan Adult College in Leicester.

== Deserted Medieval Village Research Group ==
After Hoskins left Leicester the research work was continued by the Deserted Medieval Village Research Group based at the same university. The group published a list of Leicestershire Deserted Medieval Villages edited by J. G. Hurst and M. W. Beresford, in the Transactions of the Society in 1964. This has long served as the key point of reference for Leicestershire Deserted Medieval Villages.

== Later topographical and archaeological work ==
During the last quarter of the 20th century research was extended to other lost places and earlier research findings were subjected to review. The publication of the Leicestershire volumes in the English Place-Name Society series commenced in 1998 with that on Leicester. The Leicestershire series compiler Barrie Cox also produced a summary of the key place-names in the county in 2005, although the number of lost places included was limited. However, the Leicestershire place-name volumes published so far contain a wealth of information on previously little remarked sites such as Duninc Wicon, a probable Romano-British settlement in Ullesthorpe, and Shirtecoat in Great Bowden which shared its name with locations in several other east Leicestershire parishes.

Place name evidence also identified several lost places with the familiar –by, -thorpe and –ton suffixes. Thus, Canby in Sileby, Brastorp in Ashby de la Zouch which is now represented by Prestop, and Lowton in Humberstone have been added to the list of places that are in some way disguised in the modern landscape. Archaeological excavation, frequently by the University of Leicester is also steadily adding to our knowledge of lost places throughout the county. The university's continuing annual excavation of the Burrough Hill site has highlighted its long residential history and subsequent decline. The Knave Hill abandoned Saxon settlement which was featured by Time Team on Channel 4 in 2008, also brought greater and wider recognition of the wealth of deserted and lost places in Leicestershire.

== Chronology ==
Iron Age

Chronologically, the lost places of the county are headed by those of the Iron Age period. Hill forts are obvious abandoned sites and of the three well-known sites in Leicestershire, Burrough Hill is the most significant as it is the likely pre-Roman central place of the Corieltauvi tribe that occupied much of Derbyshire, Leicestershire, Lincolnshire and Nottinghamshire. The occupation of Burrough Hill, together with Beacon Hill in Woodhouse and The Bulwarks in the tautologically named Breedon on the Hill (meaning Hill Hill on the Hill), extended into the Roman period and perhaps beyond.

Romano-British period

Romano-British sites abound in the county, most established during the first phase of the Roman invasion which was completed by about 70 AD. Of the five named key settlements, Leicester, or Ratae Corieltauvorum, was the most important and extensive as it served as the regional capital. Two additional important Romano-British sites are known at Goadby Marwood and Medbourne, but frustratingly, their names and exact sites are not known. As in other counties, continuing archaeological and historical document research is revealing further abandoned sites of the period including a much denser coverage of Romano-British villas in Leicestershire than previously identified.

Middle Ages

It is the period from the early medieval period onwards that has excited most public interest in lost places, especially the Deserted Medieval Villages of the county. In some cases, their depopulation was due to the national economic decline that was accelerated by the Black Death in the 14th century. In east Leicestershire, as in other counties, the conversion of land for sheep grazing, especially by the wealthy religious houses such as the Abbey of St Mary de Pratis in Leicester, led to the depopulation of several villages including Lowesby and Ingarsby and their replacement by monastic granges such as Goldsmith Grange that succeeded the village of Ringlethorpe in Scalford.

Many people know of, and visit sites such as Baggrave, Great Stretton, Hamilton and Knaptoft where there are clearly marked earthworks, isolated churches or remnants of buildings. Fewer perhaps know of the others, including the close neighbours Holyoaks and Prestgrave in the far southeast of the county. So far, no-one has located the precise sites of Lilinge, Netone and Plotelei which are included in Domesday Book, 1086 as Leicestershire manors. Cox has narrowed the choice for Lilinge to two likely sites, one between Bittesby and Ullesthorpe, the other close to the separate deserted village and lost place that form the intriguing Westrill and Starmore parish, which for many years in the 20th century had a population of four. Godtorp was another such Domesday manor that was for a long period regarded as a mystery location. Painstaking research has related it to the Gillethorp listed in the Leicestershire Survey of about 1130 and located it between Somerby and Newbold Saucey, the latter itself a Deserted Medieval Village.

Leicester

Many people have not considered the possibility of deserted or lost places amongst the complex of buildings that cover a major city. To the Middle Angles, Ratae Corieltauvorum was an abandoned site which was plundered for building materials. By 787 AD they had named it Legorensium which gradually evolved into Leicester. After the Norman Conquest nine urban parishes were in place in the borough, although some were probably established by the Saxons. St Nicholas, for example, is regarded by many as the seat of the 7th century Bishop of the Angles, the first Bishop of Leicester, and the fabric of the church shows many Anglo-Saxon architectural details. Of the nine medieval parishes in Leicester, four in the northern half of the borough, St Clement, St Leonard, St Michael and St Peter, fell into gradual decline, if not abandonment, during the economic downturn of the 14th century, leaving relatively extensive tracts of gardens and grazing grounds.

A further lost place in the city is the estate of the Bishop's Fee, which covered St Margaret's Field and extended up to Knighton. This was the property of the Bishops of Lincoln who included Leicestershire in their Norman diocese. The Diocese of Leicester itself was lost during the Danish invasions of the 9th and 10th centuries when it was removed to Dorchester in Oxfordshire. The lost place name Normandy in the Bishop's Fee perhaps reflects the Norman origins and allegiances of the Bishops of Lincoln. The Bishop's Fee maintained its unique status as an area not subject to borough control until the late 19th century, which encouraged the development of an extensive independent suburb, geographically within the borough boundary but outside the walls, even as early as Domesday. Numerous conflicts of interest arose from this legal position, especially since traders in the Bishop's Fee were not subject to the restrictive practices of the borough guilds, though the guilds and corporation thought otherwise.

19th and 20th centuries

More recent depopulation has followed the slum clearance programmes of the mid-20th century. In many cases this was followed by redevelopment, not always for residential purposes. Areas in the more densely populated zones of Hinckley, Loughborough and Leicester, including the numerous and often overcrowded tenements such as North's Yard off the High Street in Loughborough which housed 39 people in 1851, were demolished in the cause of improved social welfare, health and housing. Often, the people who left did not return to the new housing built on some such sites but were rehoused elsewhere. One family of ten in North's Yard, for example, had moved to Leicester Road, Loughborough by 1861. Twentieth century redevelopment saw people moved into new council homes including those built at New Parks and Stocking Farm in Leicester, which all but obliterated respectively any remnants of the medieval New Park of Bird's Nest and The Stocking.

21st century

The first decade of the 21st century has seen continued encroachment on the deserted and lost places of the county. Contemporary development of Meridian Park at Braunstone Town and extensive housing areas at Leicester Forest East have engulfed what remained of Lubbesthorpe. Nearby, Fosse Park and Grove Triangle retail and business developments have covered part of Aldeby in Enderby, thus making continuous urban development following Narborough Road from the centre of Leicester, through Braunstone Town, Aldeby (now St John's) and on to Narborough itself. This built up zone also overlies lost Bromkinsthorpe in Braunstone Gate, Leicester.

Currently, there may be profitable outcomes of further field-walking, documentary and place-name research in several Leicestershire parishes. Ashby de la Zouch and Bottesford, at opposite sides of the county, seemingly have a greater density of lost places than many other areas of the county. In Bottesford, Becklingthorpe, Easthorpe and Normanton settlements are known and thrive, but not much is known about Hardwick, Toston and Westthorpe, whose precise locations are uncertain. W. G. Hoskins's comment that any gaps on the Ordnance Survey maps of Leicestershire where a number of paths converge may be sites worthy of research holds true sixty years on.
