= Shepshed =

Town and civil parish in Leicestershire, England

Coordinates: 52.7711°N 1.2951°W

- Town
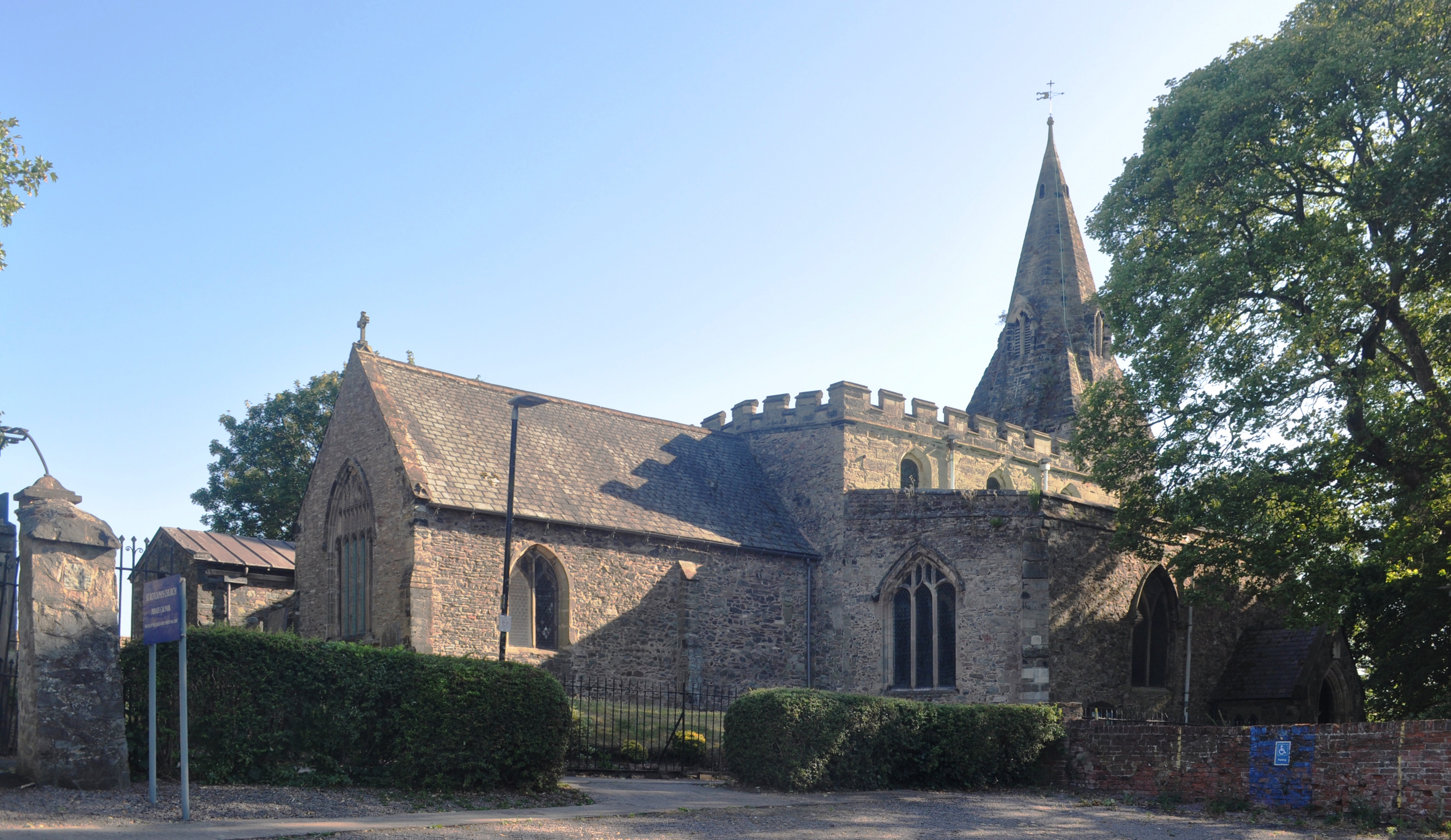
- St Botolph's Church

- Location within Leicestershire
- Population: 14,875 (2021)
- OS grid reference: SK475195
- District: Charnwood
- Shire county: Leicestershire
- Region: East Midlands
- Country: England
- Sovereign state: United Kingdom
- Post town: LOUGHBOROUGH
- Postcode district: LE12
- Dialling code: 01509
- Police: Leicestershire
- Fire: Leicestershire
- Ambulance: East Midlands
- UK Parliament: Loughborough

Shepshed (often known until 1888 as Sheepshed, also Sheepshead – a name derived from the village being heavily involved in the wool industry) is a market town and civil parish in the Charnwood Borough of Leicestershire, England with a population of 14,875 at the 2021 census. It is the second largest settlement in the borough, after Loughborough.

== History ==
=== Origins ===
The town originally grew as a centre for the wool trade. There has been controversy about the origin of the name of the town. The earliest form is Scepeshefde Regis as mentioned in the Domesday Book of 1086, which means "(King's) hill where sheep graze", but since then there have been many changes until the present form, Shepshed, was adopted in 1888. The addition of the suffix 'Regis' signifies that there was once a royal lodge in the area.

Very little information about the settlement on the site of Shepshed appears before the Domesday Book but the name is certainly Anglo-Saxon: local history books claim that Shepshed has two of the oldest roads in the country, Ring Fence and Sullington Road, the latter being an ancient British track named after the goddess Solina. Anglo-Saxon Shepshed cannot have been much more than a hamlet in a large district of forest. However, succeeding centuries provide an abundance of historical material. The prosperity of medieval Shepshed was based on the wool industry and "Well Yard" on Forest Street may well be a corruption of "Wool Yard", where Bradford wool merchants congregated to buy from local inhabitants. In addition, there is considerable evidence to suggest that a weekly market was held, at least until the 14th century.

=== Parish Church of St Botolph ===
The 11th century Parish church of St Botolph (the westernmost parish church in England to bear the name) and its land the Oakley Wood was originally given to Odo of Bayeux, half-brother of William the Conqueror, after the Norman conquest in 1066. The ownership of the estate reverted to the Crown a number of times including in 1534. A wood carving exists in the church depicting a visit of Queen Elizabeth I though it is at present unclear if the Queen ever came to Shepshed itself, but if she did, it would have been the farthest north that she travelled in the country. The older part of the town is still centred on the church.

The church's original patronage came from Leicester Abbey. Between 1699 and 1856, however, the patrons were the Phillips family of Garendon Hall. This family has been Lords of the Manor since its purchase by Sir Ambrose Phillips (1637–1691) in 1683. Garendon Hall (demolished 1964) was built on the site of Garendon Abbey, a prominent Cistercian house which was founded in 1133 by Robert de Beaumont, 2nd Earl of Leicester and survived until its dissolution by Henry VIII in 1536. Garendon Abbey, whose economy was largely based on sheep farming, was one of the most important possessor of granges in Leicestershire.

=== 18th to 20th centuries ===
The 18th century saw the enclosure of the common lands around Shepshed. There had been enclosures in the 15th and 16th centuries, but towards the end of the 18th century the last remaining common land, approximately 2,000 acres (8 km^{2}), was enclosed and divided among the principal commoners of the village.

Shepshed experienced an 'earthquake' on 30 September 1750. The vicar of St. Botolph's church at the time, the reverend Thomas Heath, recorded in the parish registers: "Sept 30, 1750, this day (Sunday), while I was administering the Sacrament, between the hours of 12 and 1 o’clock, I and the congregation were very terrible of the shock of an earthquake."

Much destruction was caused in the town when, on 30 June 1753, 85 bays of buildings were destroyed by fire which had happened at what is now known as Hall Croft, named after the school which had been burnt down in the fire.

There were many changes during the 19th century. Shepshed was briefly linked by canal to Loughborough, and to the coalmines of West Leicestershire when the Charnwood Forest Canal was opened in 1798, but success was only short lived. The following year, the dam at Blackbrook Reservoir, to the south of Shepshed, part of the ill-fated canal scheme, collapsed, causing widespread flooding in Shepshed and Loughborough. By 1804 the canal had proved an uneconomic venture and was abandoned, though modern roads and footpaths still follow the course it took through Shepshed. The Charnwood Forest Railway (nicknamed the Bluebell Line on account of the proliferation of the flower) was opened in 1883, but regular passenger services ceased in 1931. However, the goods service did not close until 1963. Shepshed railway station no longer stands though part of the old line forms a bridleway between the town and Thringstone including the now redundant viaduct at Grace Dieu.

== Landmarks ==
=== St Winefride’s Church ===
St Winefride’s is the Roman Catholic parish church in Shepshed, forming part of the Diocese of Nottingham. The church building, located on Charnwood Road, dates from the 1928 and serves the local Catholic community with regular liturgies, including weekend and weekday Masses. It also plays a role in parish life through various volunteer-led activities and services.

The parish includes St Winefride’s Catholic Voluntary Academy, a primary school situated nearby, which serves local Catholic families and feeds into secondary education at De Lisle College in Loughborough.

The spelling "Winefride" in relation to St Winifred (also spelled Wenfrewy, Gwenfrewi, or Winifred) comes from older Anglicised or Latinised versions of her original Welsh name, Gwenffrewi.

Since 2023 the parish priest has been Fr. Patrick Edet Bassey.

== Education ==
The main school was previously Hind Leys Community College which educated pupils from 14 to 19, in the town, and included pupils not only from Shepshed, but also from local towns and villages such as Loughborough, Kegworth, Belton, Castle Donington, Diseworth, Long Whatton and Tonge. This school then combined with Shepshed High School to become the new Iveshead School which educates ages 11-19 from the same areas as the previous Hind Leys Community College. There are four primary schools in the town, and three of these feed into Iveshead; Oxley, St Botolph's and Newcroft. The final primary school, St Winefride's, caters for Roman Catholic pupils until the age of 11, after which most of them transfer to De Lisle College 11–19 school in Loughborough. Newcroft Primary School became Newcroft Primary Academy in 2016.

== Transport ==
Shepshed is located close to junction 23 of the M1 motorway. The nearest railway station is Loughborough railway station, and East Midlands Airport is seven miles away.

=== Buses ===
Shepshed is serviced by Arriva Midlands services 16/16A and 127 with frequent buses into Loughborough and an hourly service to Coalville, and Diamond East Midlands' route 129 between Loughborough and Ashby. The skylink Nottingham operated by trentbarton also links the village with East Midlands Airport and Nottingham.

== Sport ==
The town is represented in the Northern Premier League by Shepshed Dynamo F.C., who play at the Dovecote Stadium. Ingles F.C. (formed in 1972) also have two football teams. The first team ground shares with Shepshed Dynamo at the Dovecote stadium while the reserves are based at Little Haw Lane. The club has progressed rapidly since 2013 with back to back promotions and now the first team currently play in the Midland League Division One with the reserves in the Leicestershire Senior League.

Shepshed Cricket Club was formed in 2015 from the merger of the towns 2 existing cricket teams; Shepshed Town and Shepshed Messengers. Shepshed Town was established in 1869 and in recent years has been ranked among the top clubs in Leicestershire. Following the merger, the club will field 4 senior sides as well as Under 15, Under 13 and Under 11 sides.

The major Rugby side in the town is Shepshed RFC. who train and play on the Hind Leys Campus. Founded in 1985, they won the LRU Division 4 in 2014 and the LRU Division 3 in 2015.

== Notable people ==
- Bruce Woolley – Musician, singer, songwriter, and record producer, lived in Shepshed.
- Kiernan Dewsbury-Hall – Footballer, grew up in Shepshed.

== Shepshed Fire Station ==
Shepshed has a retained fire station, part of Leicestershire Fire and Rescue Service (LFRS), serving the town from the fire station on Charnwood Road. The station, which opened in 2002, replaced the previous station built on the same site in 1951 and was initially opened as a combined police and fire station. The police station was quickly downgraded to an office and then withdrawn completely, leaving Shepshed without a police station for the first time in many decades. LFRS took over the entire building and now operate a training centre alongside the retained station. In front of the station is a memorial to two Shepshed police officers who were murdered in the line of duty in 2002 and two long-serving firefighters, one of whom died en route to a fire call in 2006.

The station operates a Scania pumping appliance and a Command Support Vehicle.
