= Roesia de Verdun =

Norman Irish noblewoman, castle builder

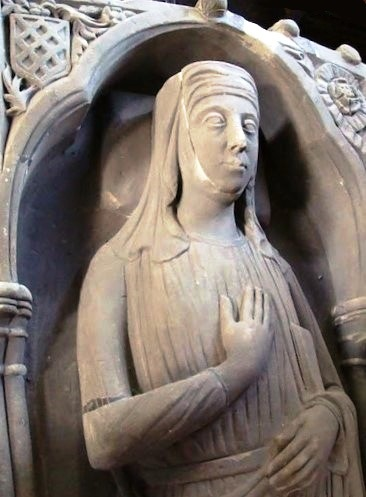
- Tomb effigy of Roesia de Verdun, now in the Church of St John the Baptist, Belton
- Born: Roesia de Verdun c. 1204
- Died: 10 February 1247; Grace Dieu

Roesia de Verdun (c. 1204 – 10 February 1247), also spelled Rohese and Rose, was a Norman femme sole heiress, and one of the most powerful women of Ireland in the 13th century.

== Biography ==
Very little is known about the early life of Roesia de Verdun before her marriage. de Verdun was the daughter of Nicholas de Verdun of Alton, Staffordshire (died 1231), and Clementia, daughter and heir of Philip le Boteler, through whom Clementia brought the estates of Stoke Farthing and Wilsford to the de Verduns. She was the heiress of her father as well as her mother.

She was first married to William Perceval de Somery (died 1221). On 4 September 1225, an agreement was made to marry between Roesia de Verdun and Theobald le Botiller. As his second wife, her five children were not heirs to his lands but they were eligible to be heirs to hers so she and they retained her family name.

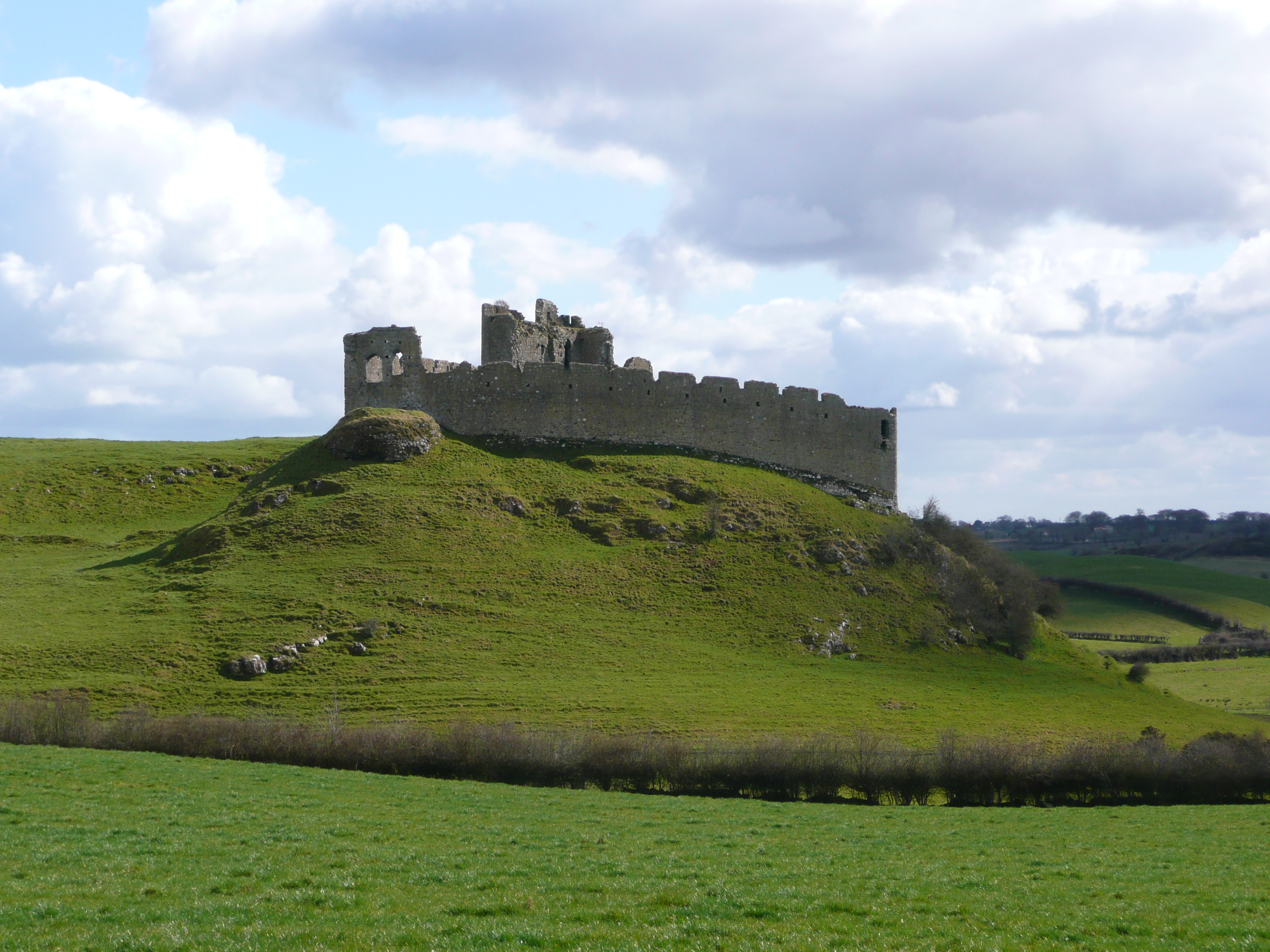
View of Castle Roche from the north west

When her husband died at Poitou in 1230 during the English invasion of France, followed by the death of her father, de Verdun claimed her inheritances after her parents and paid the taxes to be allowed remain unmarried. She applied to be a femme sole and retain her independence. The king authorised Maurice FitzGerald to grant to her her lands in April 1233.

She built Castleroche, seven miles northwest of Dundalk, in about 1236 to defend her lands. The archaeologist Tadhg O'Keefe notes that, while the royal document that the records the construction says it took place in 1236, work on the scale of Castleroche would have taken several years. She gained a strong and powerful reputation. However she was also very pious. de Verdun founded the Augustinian priory of Grace Dieu Priory in Leicestershire in 1239. As time went on however the pressure to marry again increased until de Verdun decided to become a nun. By 1242, she was a member of the community at Grace Dieu.

Her son inherited fully in 1247 when she died. Though originally buried at the priory, in the aftermath of the dissolution of the monasteries, the villagers of Belton reburied her in their parish church.

== Stories ==
After the building of her castle on the edge of the Irish frontier de Verdun garnered a violent reputation. de Verdun was said to have been a ferocious fighter and wore body armour. Stories were told of her riding into battle against her enemies, the O'Hanlons. There were also fictional tales around the building of the castle. She was said to have ordered the master mason thrown from one of the castle windows to prevent his working for anyone else, causing it to be known as the ‘murder window’. de Verdun is one of the women of Through Her Eyes by Clodagh Finn.

== Children ==
- John de Verdun, (1226–1274) who inherited the western part of the Lordship of Meath in virtue of his marriage to Margery de Lacy, daughter of Gilbert de Lacy (by his wife Isabel, daughter of Hugh Bigod, 3rd Earl of Norfolk), son of Walter de Lacy, Lord of Meath who outlived his son, and Margaret de Braose, Lady of Trim. Gilbert's daughters therefore became heiresses to their grandfather Walter de Lacy's estates. Margery's sister and co-heiress was Maud (or 'Mathilda') de Lacy, wife of Geoffrey de Geneville, 1st Baron Geneville.
- Matilda (otherwise 'Maud') de Verdun, (d. 27 November 1283) who married firstly John FitzAlan, feudal Lord of Clun and Oswestry and de jure Earl of Arundel. Maud de Verdun married secondly Richard d'Amundeville
- Isabella de Verdon
- Nicholas de Verdon
- Theobald de Verdon
