= Knave Hill =

English archeological site

Coordinates: 52.5331°N 0.9073°W

Knave Hill is an archaeological site near the village of Stonton Wyville, Leicestershire, in the English East Midlands. It was excavated by Channel 4's archaeological television programme Time Team, which found evidence of settlement dating back some 1400 years, including Iron Age, Roman and Anglo-Saxon periods. It appears that the site was abandoned as the population concentrated into villages, leaving the land free for cultivation.
