= Garendon Hall =

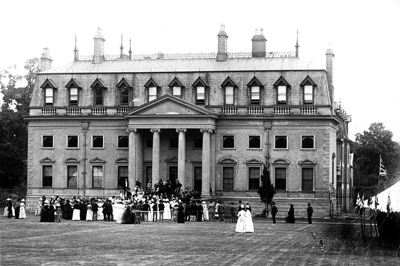
- Garendon Hall c. 1890. Showing the 18th-century Classical style house, with the "rather horrible" 19th-century Gothic mansard roof.

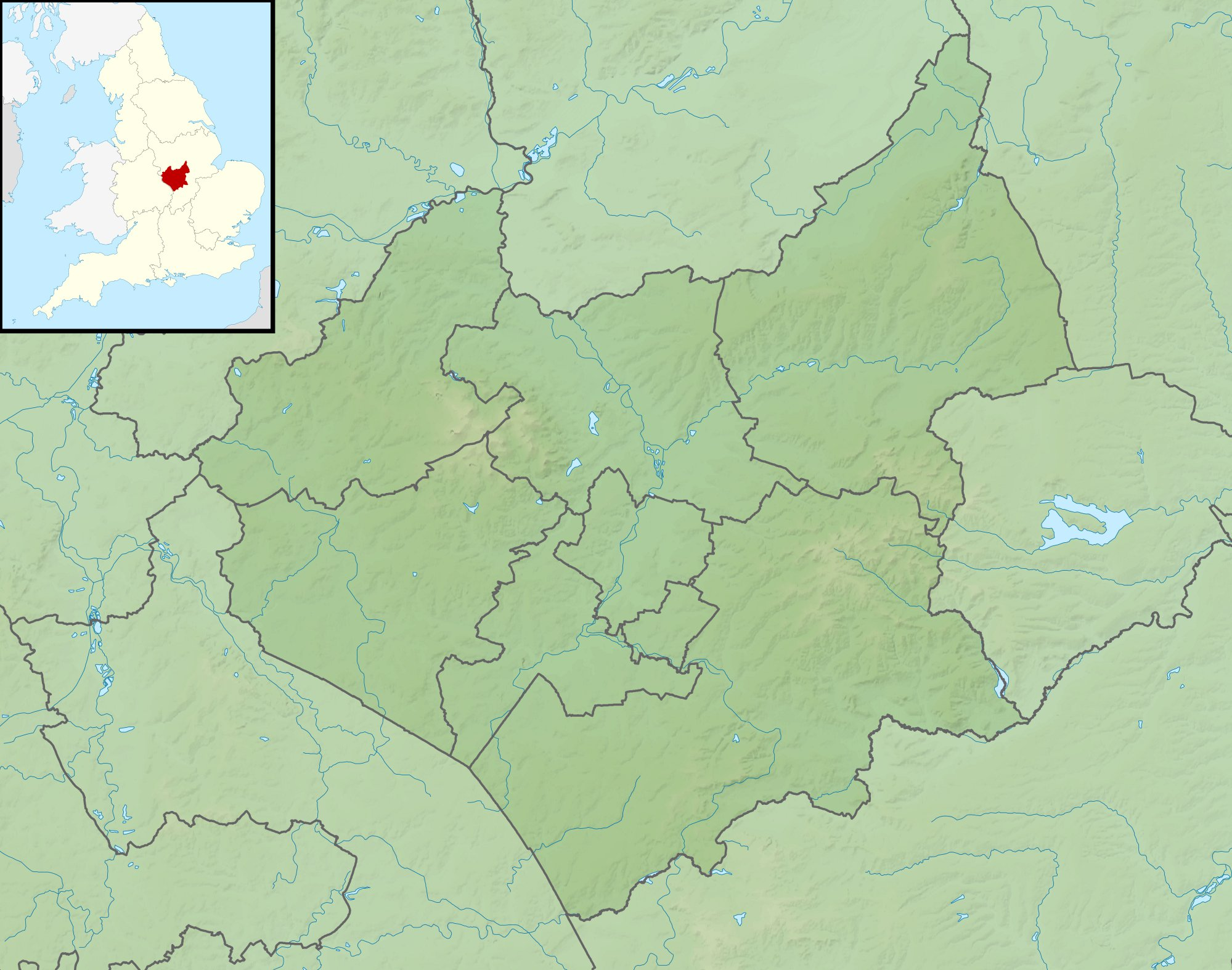
- Location within Leicestershire
- 52.7743°N 1.2585°W
- Location: Between Shepshed and Loughborough

History
- Built: 18th century
- Built for: Ambrose Phillipps (unfinished at death)
- Demolished: June 1964

Site notes
- Area: Leicestershire, England

Garendon Hall was a country home near Shepshed, Leicestershire, England. It was demolished in 1964.

== History ==
The site of Garendon Hall was formerly occupied by a Cistercian abbey, known as Garendon Abbey. The abbey was founded in 1133 and dissolved by King Henry VIII in 1536. Henry sold the abbey to Thomas Manners, 1st Earl of Rutland, for £2,356 5s 10d. The earl then constructed a house on the abbey site, known as Garendon House. The house was owned by the Earls of Rutland until 1632, when it was given as part of a dowry for the marriage of Lady Katherine Manners (daughter of the 6th Earl of Rutland) and George Villiers, 1st Duke of Buckingham. In 1640, the estate was valued at £5,648 and was reported to contain 13,350 trees.

In 1684 the 2nd Duke of Buckingham sold the house to Sir Ambrose Phillipps (a successful lawyer) for £28,000. Sir Ambrose and his son William did little to the house; his grandson, another Ambrose Phillipps (c.1707–1737), an accomplished gentleman architect inspired by his Grand Tour of France and Italy, started to change the house and the former abbey estate. Beginning in 1734, Ambrose landscaped the surrounding parkland and built to his own designs several Palladian follies, which still exist. Ambrose later began to redesign, extend and rebuild Garendon House in the Palladian style, developing it into what would be known as Garendon Hall. However, the work remained unfinished in 1737 when Ambrose died childless; it was completed by his brother Samuel, who inherited the estate (but who also died childless).

Following Samuel Phillipp's death, the hall was inherited by a cousin; eventually passing to Ambrose Charles Lisle March Phillipps De Lisle (1809–1878). Ambrose was an enthusiast for the Gothic Revival and planned to demolish the hall; commissioning Augustus Pugin (famous for his work on the Houses of Parliament) to design a replacement. Ambrose's finances were in decline, however, and the work could not be undertaken. Following Ambrose's death, the family were left with a difficult financial situation and needed to retrench. In 1885 they moved out of Garendon and into Grace Dieu Manor. A revival in their fortunes in the early 20th century permitted a return to Garendon in 1907.

The family were again forced out of the house during the Second World War, when it was used, and heavily damaged, by the army. On their return, the ever-increasing cost of running and maintaining the building, their own failing finances and crippling inheritance taxes, and threats to the house's parkland from the urban sprawl of Loughborough and the construction of the M1 motorway which would cut directly through the park, all contributed to the decision to demolish Garendon. In June 1964 the house was deliberately set on fire to provide practice and training for the local fire brigade. It was then reduced to rubble which was used in the construction of the M1 motorway. (Note: In 1964, the family returned for a final time to Grace Dieu Manor, but sold that house within a decade (Grace Dieu Manor then became a Catholic school). In 1972 the family moved to Quenby Hall, but following the collapse of the family cheese-making business, the family has been forced to offer the hall for sale (it has been for sale since 2012).)

The park setting of the demolished hall has been severely compromised by the construction of the M1 and by subsequent housing development. Both the Arch and the Temple are on the Heritage at Risk Register. As at 2020, plans for the development of some 3,200 homes in the north of the park have been submitted to the council for approval. As part of the works, the developer, Persimmon plc intends to develop some of the remainder of the park as a public amenity and undertake restoration of the main structures.

== Architecture and description ==
The new Garendon Hall planned by Ambrose Phillipps (1707–1737) was to be built in the Palladian style, eleven bays wide with a central portico topped with a triangular pediment. Ultimately, only the south front was built, and that by Phillipps' brother, rather than himself. A century later Ambrose Lisle March Phillipps De Lisle planned a complete Tudorbethan replacement. The architectural historian Mark Girouard, in his study The Victorian Country House, reproduces an illustration of Pugin's plan, entitled "Merry England Revived". (Note: Jill Franklin, in her study, The Gentleman's Country House and its Plan: 1835–1914, describes Augustus Pugin's "scheme for rebuilding Garendon Park like a medieval college".) Funds did not permit the planned rebuilding, and Phillipps instead decided to adapt the existing hall, adding a large Gothic mansard roof to the top of the classical styled hall. Pugin's son, Edward Pugin was the contracting architect, working between 1864 and 1866. The attempt to mix Gothic and Palladian styles was stylistically unsuccessful, and Nikolaus Pevsner, in his 1960 Leicestershire and Rutland volume of the Buildings of England series, described the hall as looking “really rather horrible”. Elizabeth Williamson, in her 2003 revision of the same volume, was no more complimentary; "Pugin's huge mansard roof with Franco-Flemish dormers hideously upset the whole composition".

=== Triumphal Arch ===
Ambrose Phillipps (1707–1737) had been on the Grand Tour and would have seen the examples of Roman architecture extant in Rome during the 18th century. His Triumphal Arch at Garendon is modelled on the Arch of Titus, located on the Via Sacra and dating from the 1st century. Historic England suggest it is "perhaps the earliest example of an English building inspired directly from an Ancient Roman source." Pevsner and Williamson are confident that it is "the earliest known interpretation of a triumphal arch in England". The arch has a central opening, with Cornithian columns supporting an entablature which is carved with scenes from the Metamorphosis of Actaeon.

=== Temple of Venus ===
The Temple of Venus, like the arch, is based on a Roman example, in this case the Temple of Vesta at Tivoli. The building, constructed in ashlar, is circular with a peristyle of Ionic columns supported a domed roof. The roof is now of copper, the original lead covering having been stolen. The temple contained a statue of Venus but this is no longer in situ. (Note: The local legend is that the statue was destroyed by Luddites during their uprisings in the early 19th century.)

=== Obelisk ===
The obelisk is of brick, covered in stucco, and stands 24m high. It is positioned on a moulded pedestal.

=== Listing designations ===
The Triumphal Arch is listed Grade I. The Temple of Venus is Grade II*, while the Obelisk is Grade II. The three lodges at the entrance drives into the estate, the White Lodge, Snell's Nook Lodge, and the Bavarian Gate are all listed at Grade II. Remnants of the Palladian House also have Grade II listings and include the wrought-iron screens and gates, a gateway and its associated railings, and an entrance arch. The estate boundary wall is also listed Grade II, as are various agricultural buildings including a barn, outbuildings, and a dovecote.

== Gallery ==
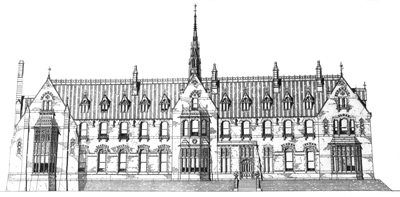
Augustus Pugin's unexecuted design for Garendon Hall

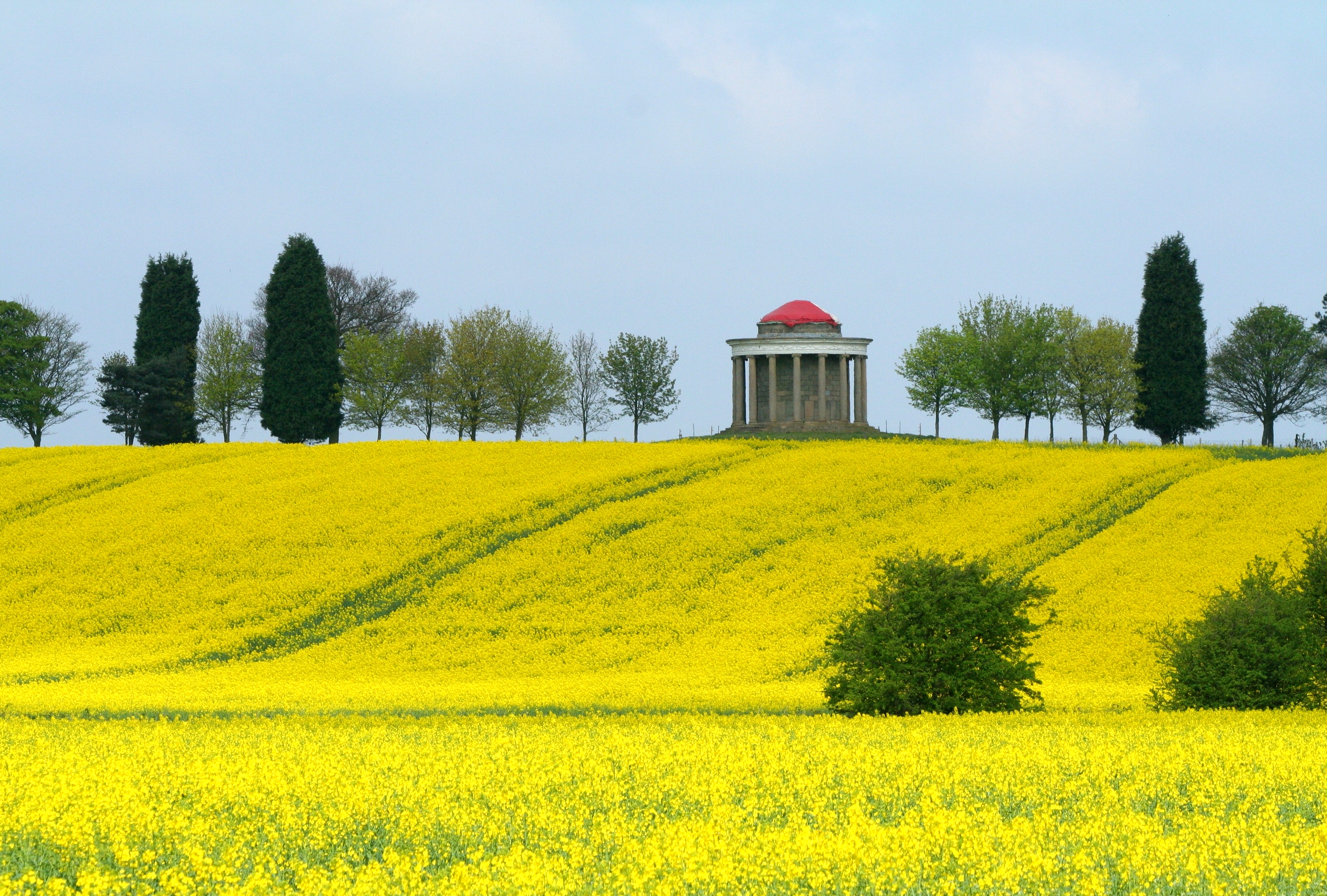
Temple of Venus

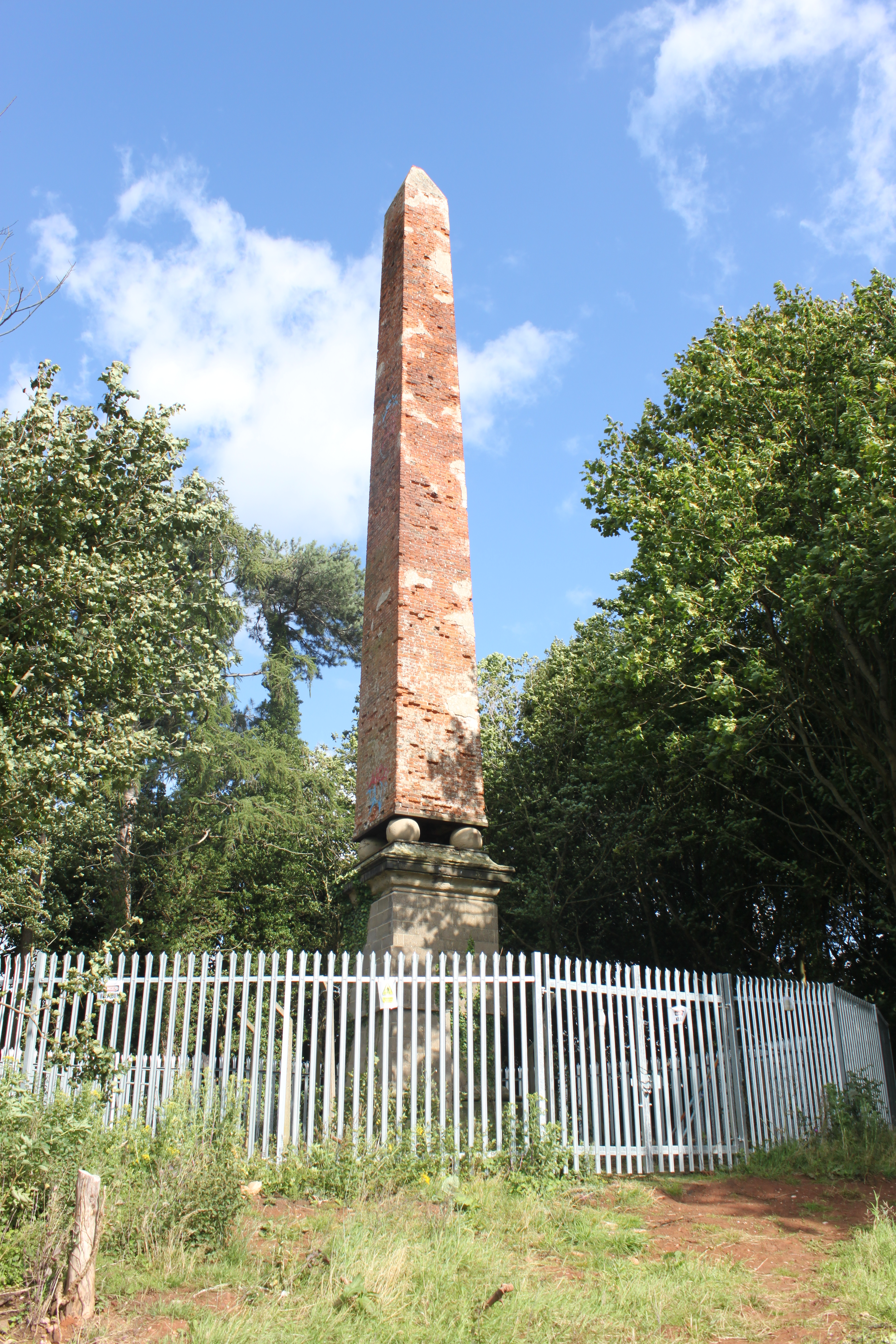
The Obelisk

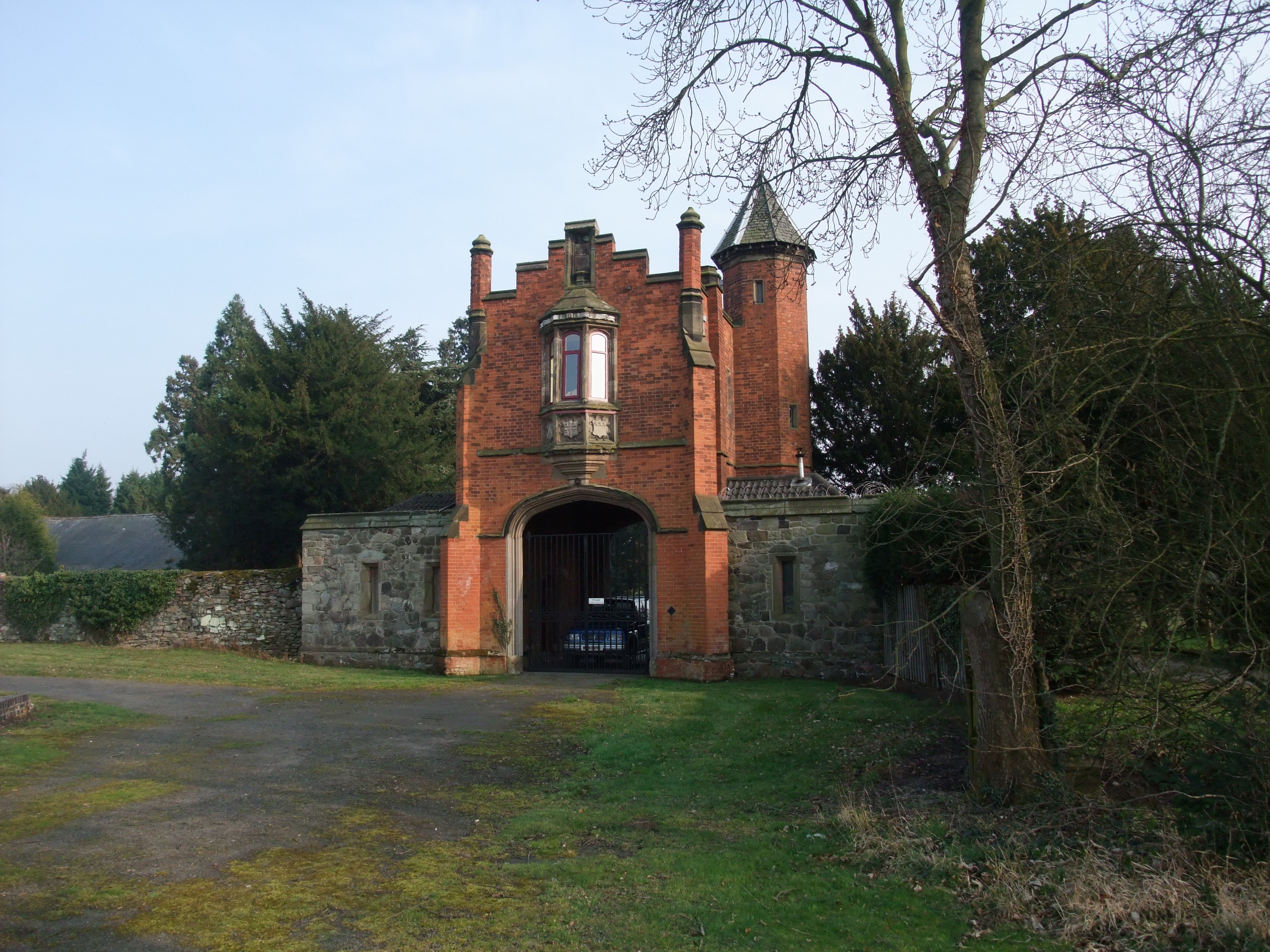
The Bavarian Gate

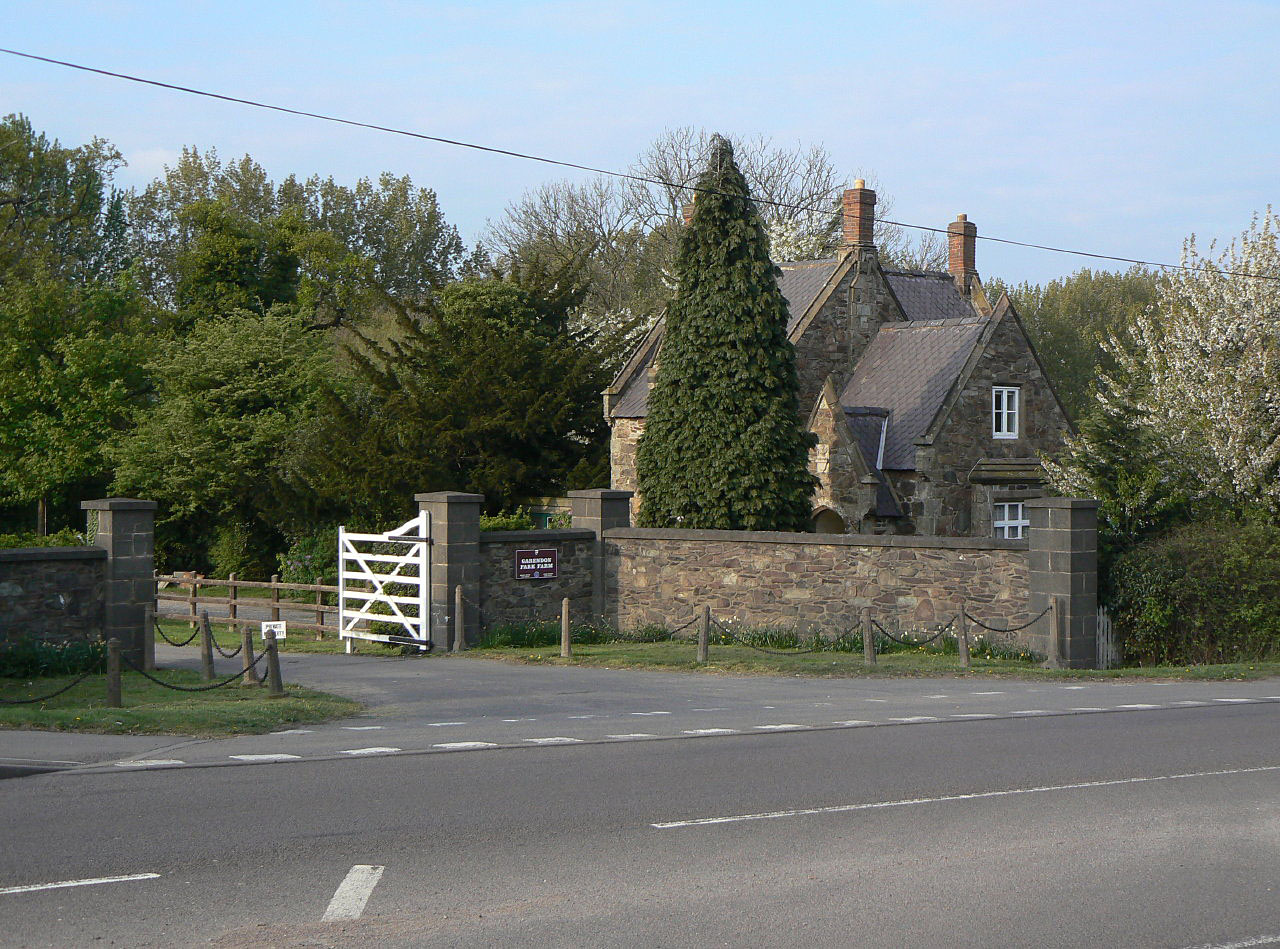
Snell's Nook Lodge

== See also ==
- Garendon Abbey

== Sources ==
- Colvin, Howard (1978). A Biographical Dictionary of British Architects: 1600–1840. London: John Murray. OCLC 1337285841.
- Franklin, Jill (1981). The Gentleman's Country House and its Plan 1835–1914. London, UK: Routledge & Kegan Paul. ISBN 978-0-710-00622-6.
- Girouard, Mark (1979). The Victorian Country House. New Haven, US and London: Yale University Press. ISBN 978-0-300-02390-9.
- Pevsner, Nikolaus; Williamson, Elizabeth (2003). Leicestershire and Rutland. Buildings of England. New Haven, US and London: Yale University Press. ISBN 9780300096187. OCLC 49298894.
- Schulz, Marjorie (2009). Gracedieu and Garendon Revisited. Panda Eyes Publishers.
