= Belton, Leicestershire =

Village in Leicestershire, England

Coordinates: 52.781°N 1.338°W

Belton
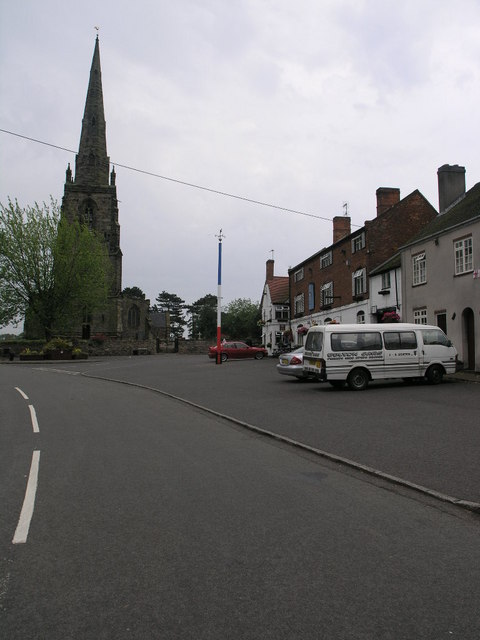
- Market Place, Belton

- Location within Leicestershire
- Population: 734 (parish; 2011 Census)
- OS grid reference: SK 44827 20631
- Civil parish: Belton
- District: North West Leicestershire
- Shire county: Leicestershire
- Region: East Midlands
- Country: England
- Sovereign state: United Kingdom
- Post town: LOUGHBOROUGH
- Postcode district: LE12
- Dialling code: 01530
- Police: Leicestershire
- Fire: Leicestershire
- Ambulance: East Midlands
- UK Parliament: North West Leicestershire

Belton is a small village and civil parish in the North West Leicestershire district of Leicestershire, England. The village is located approximately 2 miles (3.2 km) northwest of the town of Shepshed, 5.5 miles (8.9 km) west-northwest of Loughborough, and 6 miles (9.7 km) northeast of Ashby-de-la-Zouch.

According to the 2011 Census, the parish (Including Grace-Dieu) had a population of 734.

== History ==
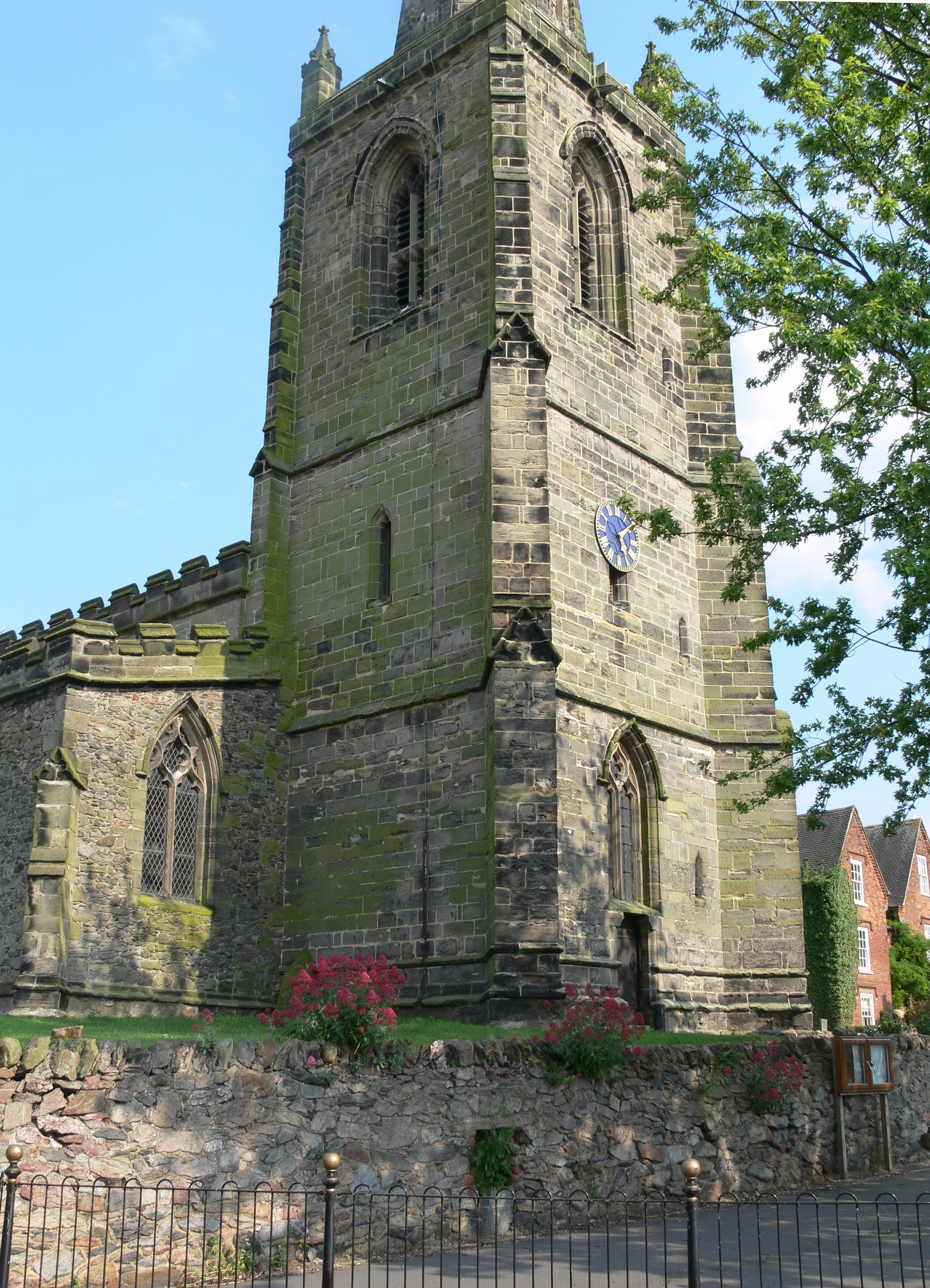
Church of St John the Baptist, Belton

The village's name means 'farm/settlement close to a beacon or funeral pyre'. Another suggestion is farm/settlement on an island or glade'.

"The Parish Church of Belton is a 14th century structure with a later perpendicular tower, clorestory and roof. It contains the recumbent effigy tomb of Lady Roesia de Verdun, foundress of the nearby Grace Dieu Priory, and Francis Beaumont, Justice of the Common Pleas, was also buried in the church on 22nd April 1598. The registers go back to 1538."

Belton also has a Church of England Primary school which caters for children aged between 4 and 10. The original school was founded in 1843 with an additional class room and cloak room added to the western door in the early 1900s this is now a private home. The present school was built in 1976 on another site with more land for playing fields situated on Sadlers Wells on the edge of the village.

The local football team, Belton Villa FC, play in Division Two of the North Leicestershire Football League. The Recy also has a children's play area.The village is also home to a doctors surgery which is situated at number 1 Mill Lane. Belton has one of the few remaining free-standing maypoles in the country. The Members of the school still dance around the maypole and crown a May Queen. The village also has a village shop and The Queens Head the one remaining pub a public house since 1800s which is now a gastro pub and restaurant situated in the heart of the village next to the shop.The George a former coaching inn, is now several private homes overlooking the maypole and church.

== Industry and employment ==
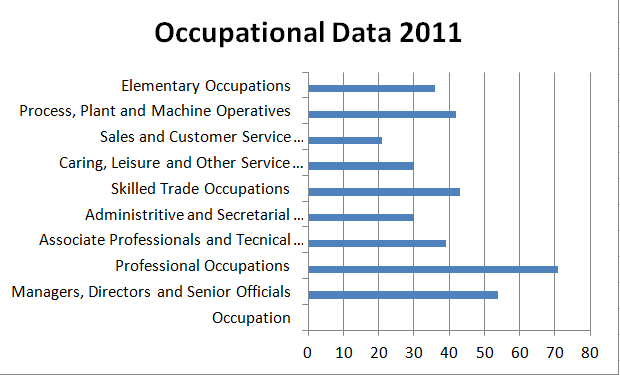
A graph produced on Excel on the occupation of the Economically active people of belton

The earliest occupational data for Belton is from 1881. The stacked bar chart presents a simplified version of the 1881 occupational data, using the 'Orders' used in the published reports for 1881, plus an 'Unknown' category. Many of these categories combine 'Workers and Dealers' in different commodities, therefore it is hard to distinguish workers in manufacturing and services.

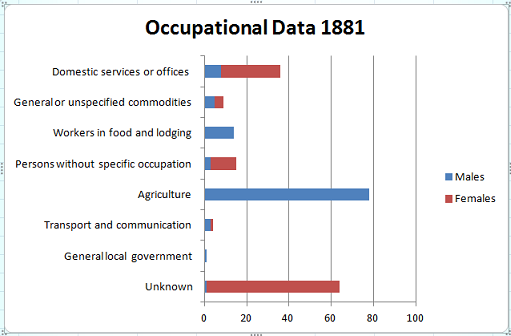
Occupational data of both male and females in Belton during 1881

The most common occupational area of the time was agriculture. This is more than likely due to the surroundings of Belton; the parish has vast surroundings of arable land still used today. This factor, along with the fact that jobs today may not have existed back then, meant there was a limited number of professions to go into. Agriculture, unsurprisingly, was dominated by males at the time, whereas many of the women's occupation were unknown, or in domestic services.

The Occupational data here from the 2011 Census shows us the change over time in all different manner of occupations. The most popular is professional occupations, with around 71 and just under 20% of the economically active residents, followed by managers, directors and senior officials, where there are around 54, which is just under 15% of the economically active population. Of the 734 residents of Belton, there are 358 out of a possible 365 who are economically active between the ages of 16 and 74. This breaks down to 49% of the village being economically active and in employment. Around 15% of the village are retired and the remainder of the village fall under; sick/disabled, students, or look after home/family.

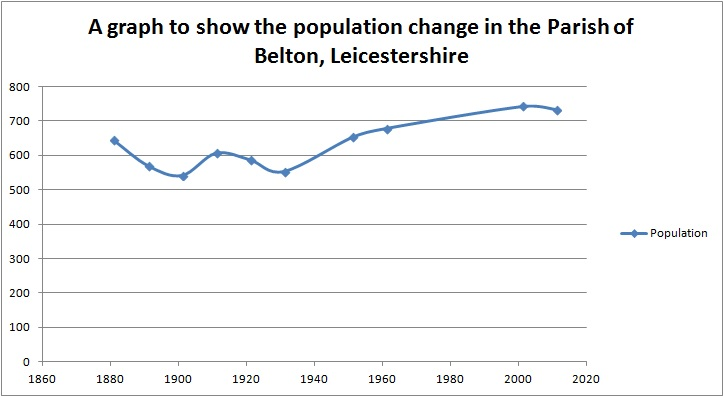
Population change in Belton from 1881 to 2011, gaps between 1971 and 1991

== Population and housing ==
The earliest record of population in Belton was in 1801, when there was a total of 586 residents in the area. This increased steadily for 50 years to 751. However, a gap in the dataset from 1851 to 1881 shows there was a significant drop between here to 645. From 1881 there was a steady decline until 1911, where after that there has been a steady increase to a current population of 734. This could be down to the boundary changes that happened between 1931 and 1934 which changed the acreage and population of Belton. The 2011 census recorded that 49% of the village was male and 51% female which suggests the gender distribution is rather well balanced.

The 2011 census also noted that of the 734 residents, 712 classed themselves as White; English/Welsh/Scottish/Northern Irish/British (Persons). More information showed that the Parish was predominantly Christian, with 69% stating that as their religion. A further 20% stated no religion and 9% did not state theirs. This information is unsurprising as due to the low population and the Parish is based around a church, with a Church of England school also at the heart. The likelihood is that Christianity would be the most popular religion.

Housing in Belton has fluctuated through the 20th century dropping to 126 houses in 1921 and rising to 184 houses in 1961. Since then there has been a steady increase up to the current number of 315 houses recorded from the last census. The current make up of households are primarily built up of Married/Same sex partnerships without children, followed closely by Married/Same sex partnerships with children.
