= Mark Elvins =

British priest and theologian

Mark Turnham Elvins OFMCap (26 November 1939 – 1 May 2014) was Warden of Greyfriars, Oxford, until its closure in 2008.

== Life ==
Mark Turnham Elvins was born on 26 November 1939 in Whitstable, the son of an Anglican priest who had been rector of St Mary in the Castle, Dover.

Elvins was educated at Dover College, St Stephen's House, Oxford, Beda College, Pontifical Gregorian University, and Heythrop College, where he earned his Master of Arts (MA) degree from the University of London. He received a Graduate Diploma in Spirituality at Milltown Institute, Dublin.

At the beginning of his career, he passed into the Royal Military Academy Sandhurst but opted for the Territorial Army, serving with the Honourable Artillery Company and eventually reaching the rank of captain in the Royal Army Chaplains' Department. In civilian life he began by working as a gallery manager at St James's Gallery, Jermyn Street, London, and as assistant editor of Debrett's Peerage. Following his theological studies at St Stephen's House, Oxford, he was ordained an Anglican deacon.

On 24 December 1968 he was received into the Roman Catholic Church. He was ordained a priest in Arundel on Easter Sunday 1973 and was assistant curate at Arundel Cathedral and Chantry priest to the Duke of Norfolk from 1973 to 1979. From 1980 until 1990 he served at St Mary Magdalene's parish church in Brighton, holding additionally the post of Chaplain to the Master of the Worshipful Company of Scriveners of the City of London. From 1990 until 1993 he was parish priest of Henfield. In 1999, he was professed in the Order of Friars Minor Capuchin and was a Provincial Definitor from 2006 to 11. During the academic years 2005–2007 he was the Roman Catholic chaplain to the University of Central Lancashire. Following the retirement of Nicholas Richardson in 2007, Elvins was appointed warden of Greyfriars, Oxford, and upon the dissolution of the permanent private hall was appointed guardian of the friary (Greyfriars) from 2008 to 2011.

Throughout his life Elvins was particularly concerned for the homeless and was the founder of Simon House in Oxford (1967), the St Thomas Fund for the Homeless in Brighton (1980) and Becket Homes in Canterbury (1997), as well as being a co-founder of the Thomas More Legal Centre. In 2011, he founded Regina Palestinae (Our Lady of Palestine), a charity for the support of poor families in Palestine.

In 1982, Elvins was appointed an Ecclesiastical Knight of Grace of the Sacred Military Constantinian Order of Saint George and chaplain and council member of the British and Irish delegation of the order.

In 2003, the order awarded him the Gold Benemerenti Medal. He was also a chaplain of Magistral Grace of the Sovereign Military Hospitaller Order of Saint John of Jerusalem, of Rhodes, and of Malta. In 2007, he led a wreath-laying ceremony in honour of Henry Benedict Stuart at the Royal Hospital Chelsea in London.

The Heraldry Society holds an annual Mark Elvins Lecture. On 16 April 2008, the Rt Revd Dom Geoffrey Scott OSB, Abbot of Douai, spoke on "The heraldry of James II and his cult".

== Death ==
Elvins died on 1 May 2014, aged 74, from cancer.

== Publications ==
- Mark Turnham Elvins (Mark of Whitstable), A Eucharistic vision and the spirituality of St Francis of Assisi (Leominster: Gracewing, 2007), ISBN 9780852446638
- M.T. Elvins (Mark of Whitstable), Gospel chivalry: Franciscan Romanticism (Leominster: Gracewing, 2006), ISBN 9780852446645
- M.T. Elvins, Catholic trivia: our forgotten heritage, illustrated by John Ryan (Leominster: Gracewing, 2002; previously published London: HarperCollins Religious, 1992), ISBN 9780852445594
- M.T. Elvins, Our Lady and the Ecumenical movement in the light of her maternal patronage: a paper given to members of the Canterbury branch of the Society on 27 September 1997 (Wallington: Ecumenical Society of the Blessed Virgin Mary, 2000), ISBN 9780855973735
- M.T. Elvins, St. Thomas Becket and the homeless (London: Buckland, 1994), ISBN 9780721208541
- M.T. Elvins, "St." Thomas of Dover: monk and martyr (London: Buckland, 1994), ISBN 9780721208091
- M.T. Elvins, Towards a people's liturgy: the importance of language (Leominster: Gracewing, 1994), ISBN 9780852442579
- M.T. Elvins, Cardinals and heraldry, illustrated by Anselm Baker, foreword by the Archbishop of Birmingham (Maurice Noël Léon Couve de Murville), preface by John Brooke-Little (Norroy and Ulster King of Arms) (London: Buckland Publications, 1988), ISBN 9780721207889
- M.T. Elvins and Teresa Searle, Drugs: how the Church can help (Great Wakering: McCrimmons, 1987), ISBN 9780855973964
- M.T. Elvins, The Church's response to the homeless (Great Wakering: Mayhew McCrimmon, 1985), ISBN 9780855973735
- M.T. Elvins, Arundel Priory, 1380–1980: the College of the Holy Trinity (London: Phillimore, 1981), ISBN 9780850333626
- M.T. Elvins, Bayham Abbey 1182–1982: its founder and his family (Hove: Chichester Diocesan Fund and Board of Finance, 1981), OCLC 876784049
- M.T. Elvins, 'Oxford University Heraldry Society', The Coat of Arms NS 4.119 (1981), ISSN 0010-003X
- M.T. Elvins, Old Catholic England (London: Catholic Truth Society, 1978), OCLC 5076104

Academic offices
Preceded by Nicholas Richardson	Warden of Greyfriars, Oxford; 2007–2008	Succeeded by Closed
