= Peter Ventress =

British businessman (born c. 1960)

Peter John Ventress (born 3 December 1960) is a British businessman who has been non-executive chairman of Galliford Try since 2016. He became Chairman of Bunzl in April 2020.

He was educated at St Joseph's College, Upper Norwood, Greyfriars, Oxford (BA Modern History and Modern Languages, 1983), and the Open University (MBA 1993). He was CEO of Corporate Express NV from 2007 to 2008, President of Staples International from 2008 to 2009, and CEO of Berendsen from 2010 to 2015.
