= Iain Ferguson (businessman) =

British businessman

- Education: University of St Andrews
- Occupation: Businessman
- Title: Chief executive, Tate & Lyle
- Term: 2003–2009
- Predecessor: Simon Gifford
- Successor: Javed Ahmed

Iain Ferguson CBE is a British businessman. He is the chairman of Wilton Park, Berendsen and Stobart Group.

== Career ==
Following graduation from the University of St Andrews with a BSc in chemistry and psychology, he worked for Unilever for 26 years. Ferguson has been president of the Food and Drink Federation, and was CEO of Tate & Lyle plc from May 2003 to October 2009.

He is the chairman of Wilton Park, Berendsen plc and Stobart Group Ltd. He has been a non-executive director at Balfour Beatty, Davis Service Group and Greggs plc. He is the honorary vice president of the British Nutrition Foundation (BNF), and the lead non-executive board member for the UK government's Department for Environment, Food and Rural Affairs (DEFRA).

== Personal life ==
His wife and daughter are also graduates of St Andrews.

== Honours ==
In the Queen's 2003 Birthday Honours List, Ferguson was appointed a CBE for services to the food industry.
