= Javed Ahmed =

Pakistani American businessman

- Born: Javed Ahmed; 10 February 1960 (age 66)
- Education: Williams College; Stanford Graduate School of Business
- Occupation: Businessman
- Years active: 1984–present
- Title: Former CEO, Tate & Lyle
- Term: 2009–2018
- Predecessor: Iain Ferguson
- Successor: Nick Hampton
- Spouse: Talat Ahmed

Javed Ahmed (born 10 February 1960) is a Pakistani American businessman. He was the chief executive (CEO) of Tate & Lyle plc from 2009 to 2018.

== Early life ==
Ahmed graduated from Williams College, Williamstown, Massachusetts, in 1982, and received an MBA from Stanford Graduate School of Business in 1984.

== Career ==
He started his career with Procter & Gamble, then spent five years with Bain & Co in London and Boston, before joining Reckitt Benckiser, where he worked for 17 years.

Ahmed became CEO of Tate & Lyle in October 2009, replacing Iain Ferguson. In January 2018, the retirement of Ahmed, effective from 1 April 2018 was announced, and chief financial officer Nick Hampton was named CEO-designate.

In December 2018 it was announced that Ahmed would become a non-executive director of CF Industries.

== Personal life ==
He is married to his wife, Talat.
