= Sophus Berendsen =

Sophus Berendsen (16 October 1829 – 18 June 1884) was a Danish founder of Sophus Berendsen A/S (now Berendsen plc).

== Early life and education ==
Berendsen was born on 16 October 1829 in Copenhagen, the son of Isak Nathan Berendsen (1782–1852) and Rachel Meyer (1788–1851). He received a thorough commercial education and then worked as a clerk in a trading firm.

== Career ==
In 1854, Berendsen established his own firm which traded in iron, steel and glass, initially as a commodity broker but later as an import business. The firm prospered from the building boom that followed in the many new districts that emerged when Copenhagen's fortifications were decommissioned a few years later. Berendsen lived to see it develop into the largest company of its kind in the country.

== Personal life ==
Berendsen married Mariane Levin (17 April 1825 – 14 May 1886), a daughter of merchant Assor Levin (1778–1834) and Susanne Cohn (died 1859), on 26 May 1858 in Copenhagen.

Berendsen died on 18 June 1884 in Copenhagen and is buried at the Jewish North Cemetery. The firm was continued by his widow and after her death just two years later by their son Albert Berendsen. It was after his early death just 37 years old in 1897 converted into a family-owned limited company (aktieselskab).

Another son, Ivar Berendsen, was a customs inspector and politician, co-founder of the Danish Social Liberal Party.
