= Berendsen plc =

- Type: Public company
- Traded as: LSE: BRSN
- Industry: Textile rental service
- Founded: 1854
- Headquarters: Søborg
- Key people: Iain Ferguson, chairman James Drummond, CEO
- Revenue: £1,110.0 million (2016)
- Operating income: £140.7 million (2016)
- Net income: £91.5 million (2016)
- Website: berendsen.com

Berendsen Textile Service (formerly Sophus Berendsen, Berendsen plc and The Davis Service Group Plc) is a provider of textile maintenance services with headquarters in Søborg, Denmark. The company is a wholly owned subsidiary of French company Elis SA.

== History ==
=== Sophus Berendsen ===
The company traces its history back to 1854 when Sophus Berendsen established as wholesaler of iron and glass for the construction industry in Copenhagen. Prior to his death in 1898 it had grown to the largest company of its kind in Denmark. It was after his death continued by his widow and after her death just two years later by his son Albert Berendsen.

=== Godfrey Davis and Finnish-Danish merger ===
Godfrey Davis was founded in London, England in 1920 as car rental company. It was first listed on the London Stock Exchange in 1959. In 1987 it acquired Sunlight Services, a leading laundry business founded in 1900. In 1991 it sold most of its car dealerships (having already sold the car rental business) and the name was changed to Davis Service Group. In 1996 it acquired Spring Grove Services, another leading laundry business. In 2002 it bought Sophus Berendsen, a leading Danish laundry business for £426 million. Then in 2007 it bought the textile service business of Germany's Permaclean.

On 31 July 2009 the company appointed Peter Ventress chief executive officer of Davis Service Group. The business was renamed as Berendsen plc with effect from 4 January 2011. In August 2015 the company appointed James Drummond Chief Executive Officer.

=== Takeover by Elis ===
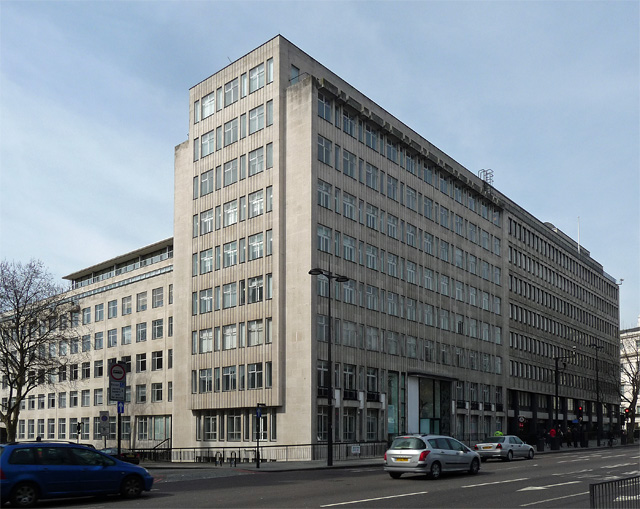
Berendsen's head office at Grosvenor Place, London

On 18 May 2017 it was reported that the French laundry services group Elis had proposed a hostile takeover of Berendsen. This occurred after Berendsen's board repeatedly rejected cash and share offers from Elis, claiming the offers undervalued the company. On 7 June 2017 Elis reached a preliminary agreement to acquire Berendsen in a deal valuing Berendsen at about £2.20bn. The transaction was completed in September 2017.

== Collusion ==
In December 2017 Berendsen Cleanroom Services was fined £1.2 million by the Competition and Markets Authority (CMA) for breaking competition laws, after it was found "colluding" with rival company Micronclean Limited in a market-sharing agreement. Micronclean was also fined.

== Operations ==
The Berendsen Group is divided into four business lines:

- Hospitality
- Healthcare
- Workwear
- Facility (mats, washroom and cleanroom)
