= Quantum Hi-Tech =

- Owner: Xianjing Zeng
- Website: qht.cc
- Commercial: Yes
- Launched: 2000; 26 years ago

Quantum Hi-Tech (simplified Chinese: 量子高科; traditional Chinese: QHT; lit. 'searching for treasure website') is a food and food research company. It was founded in 2000 and listed on the Shenzhen Stock Exchange in 2010. Their products include oligosaccharides.

The company was named to the 2013 Forbes "small and medium listed companies in Asia" 200 list.

In June 2022, Tate & Lyle acquired Quantum Hi-Tech for $237 million.

== Products ==
- Fructooligosaccharides (FOS)
- Galactooligosaccharides (GOS)
