= Nick Hampton (businessman) =

British businessman (born 1967)

- Born: Anthony Nicholas Seymour Hampton; April 1967 (age 59)
- Education: St John's College, Oxford
- Occupation: Businessman
- Title: CEO, Tate & Lyle
- Term: April 2018-
- Predecessor: Javed Ahmed

Anthony Nicholas Seymour Hampton (born April 1967) is a British businessman and the chief executive officer (CEO) of Tate & Lyle since April 2018. As CEO, he oversaw the sale of Tate & Lyle's commodities business to private equity in 2021, shifting its focus to sweetening, mouthfeel, and fortification. He first joined the company as chief financial officer in 2014. Prior to that, he had a 20-year career at PepsiCo.

== Early life ==
Hampton was born in Burton upon Trent. He has a master's degree in chemistry from St John's College, Oxford.

== Career ==
Prior to joining Tate & Lyle, Hampton held a number of senior roles over a twenty-year career at PepsiCo, rising to senior vice president and chief financial officer, Europe in 2008, a position he held until 2013 when he was appointed PepsiCo's president, West Europe region and senior vice president commercial, Europe. He joined Tate & Lyle as chief financial officer in 2014.

In January 2018, it was announced that Javed Ahmed would retire as CEO effective 1 April 2018, and Hampton would succeed him as CEO.

== Personal life ==
A resident of Chorleywood, Hampton is married with three grown daughters.
