= Anselm Baker =

English artist

Anselm Baker (1834–1885), was an English artist.

Baker first acquired a knowledge of drawing and painting at Hardman & Co.'s studios in Birmingham. He became a Cistercian monk at Mount St Bernard Abbey, Leicestershire, in 1857, and died there on 11 February 1885.

Baker was a heraldic artist. About two-thirds of the coats-of-arms in Foster's Peerage were drawn by him, and are signed 'F.A.' (Frater Anselm). He also executed the mural paintings in the chapel of St Scholastica's Priory, Atherstone; in St Winifred's, Shepshed; in the Temple in Garendon Park, and in the Lady and Infirmary chapels at Mount St Bernard Abbey.

The Hortus Animæ and Horæ Diurnæ, published in London, and several beautiful works brought out at Mechelin and Tournai, bear witness to his inventive genius. His Liber Vitæ, a record of the benefactors of St Bernard Abbey, is magnificently illustrated with pictures of the arms and patron saints of the benefactors. He also left unpublished The Armorial Bearings of English Cardinals and The Arms of the Cistercian Houses of England.

Cardinals and Heraldry (London: Buckland Publications, 1988) by Mark Turnham Elvins used his illustrations.
