= Greyfriars, Oxford =

Catholic friary in Oxford, UK

Greyfriars
- University of Oxford
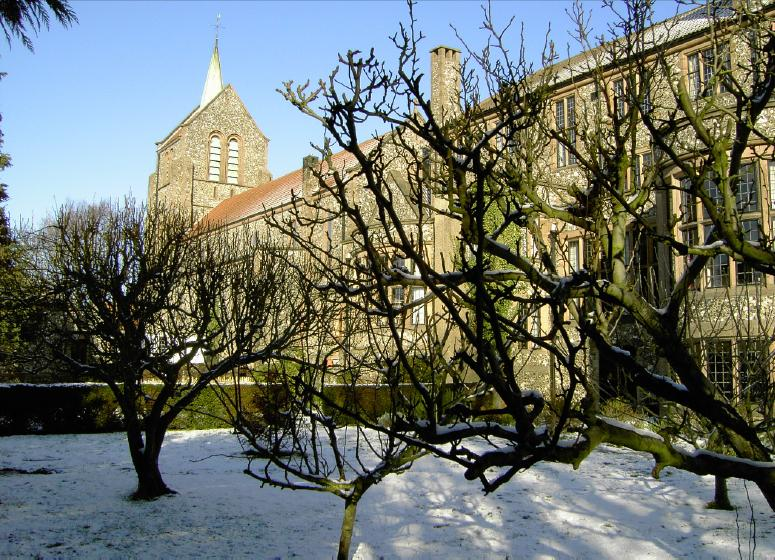

- Location: Iffley Road
- Coordinates: 51.746801°N 1.240168°W
- Motto: My God and My All
- Established: 1910
- Closed: 2008
- Named for: The Order of Friars Minor Capuchin
- Former names: Grosseteste House (1919–1930)
- Warden: Mark Elvins
- Undergraduates: c. 50 (2008)
- Website: www.greyfriarsoxford.uk

Map
- Location within Oxford

Greyfriars is a Roman Catholic friary and parish located in East Oxford, which until 2008 was also a permanent private hall of the University of Oxford. Situated on the Iffley Road in East Oxford, it was one of the smallest constituent halls of the university. It was governed by the Order of Friars Minor Capuchin, a Franciscan religious order.

In 2007 the decision was made to close the hall, with students transferred to Regent's Park College. The buildings continue to host the friary which formerly co-existed with the hall.

Greyfriars has one of the most distinctive buildings in Oxford; it is the only flint-stone Norman-style building in the city, and its green spire is prominent along the Iffley Road and from the university's Roger Bannister running track.

== History ==
=== Medieval friary ===
The original Greyfriars church and friary was founded by the Franciscans in 1224. The friars had a long and esteemed history in Oxford, listing many famous alumni, including the English statesman, Robert Grosseteste, also a theologian and Bishop of Lincoln, who became head of Greyfriars, Master of the School of Oxford from 1208, and the first Chancellor of the University of Oxford. In 1517, the order divided into two branches. The friars who had been living in city-convents, ministering there and teaching in universities became known as "Conventuals"; while the friars who preferred a more eremitical life became known as "Observants". (The Capuchins developed in 1528.) The friaries were suppressed during the Reformation in the 16th century.

=== 20th-century friary and hall ===
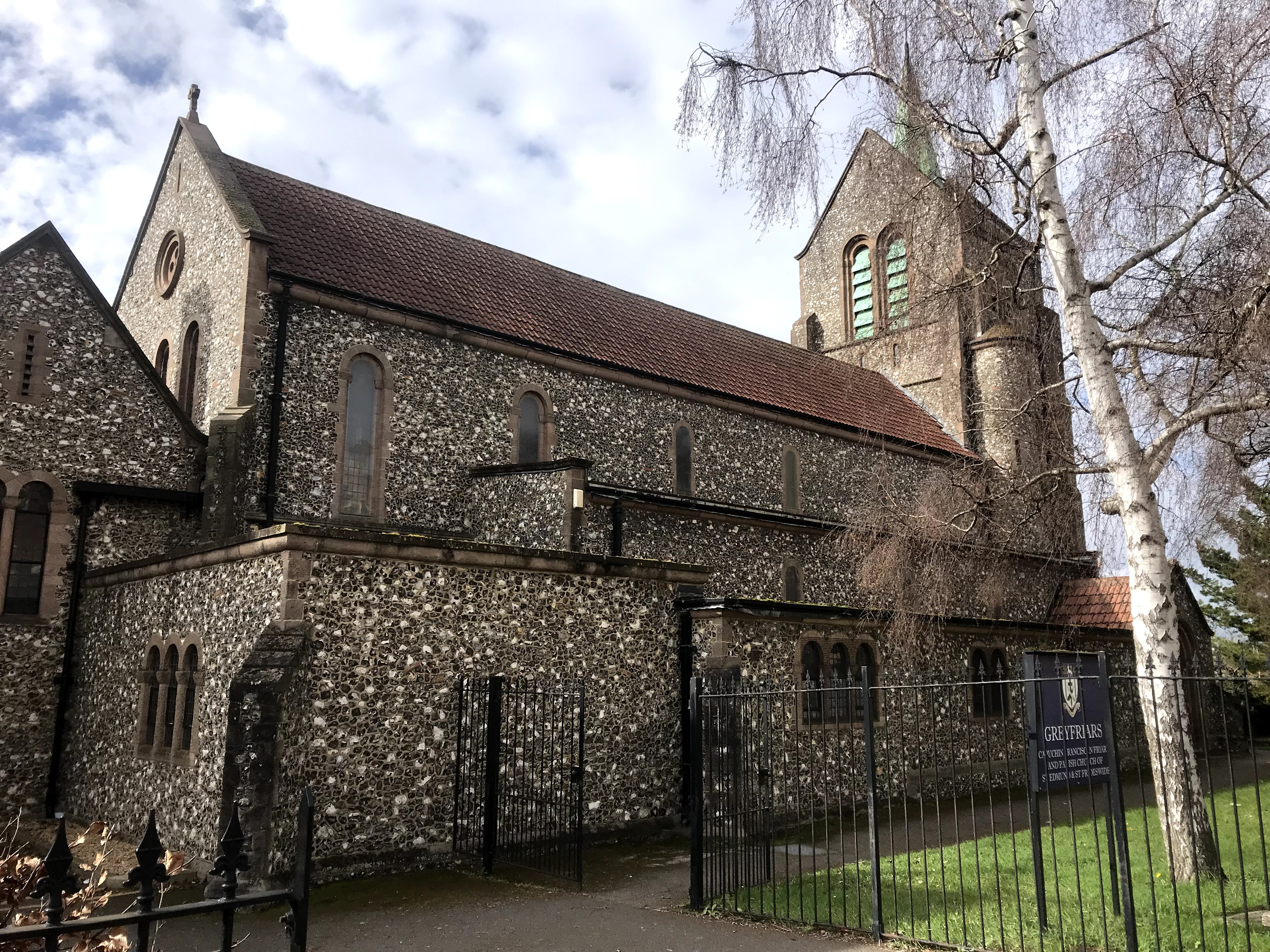
The Church of St Edmund and St Frideswide

In 1905, the Capuchin branch of the order established a friary, known as St Anselm's, which was recognised by the university as a house of studies in 1910. The Church of St Edmund and St Frideswide on Iffley Road was established in 1911 as a chapel of ease to the Jesuit Church of St Aloysius; the architect was Benedict Williamson. In 1928, the Jesuits handed it over to the Capuchins, who then built the friary.

In 1919, the friars moved to the current site on the Iffley Road – first naming it Grosseteste House after the first head of the original Greyfriars – and on completion of the present building in 1930, the name of Greyfriars was adopted once more. The status of permanent private hall was conferred upon Greyfriars by the university in 1957 and surrendered in 2008.

=== Closure of the hall ===
In October 2007, the order announced its intention to withdraw from its ministry as a permanent private hall of the university, for financial and personnel reasons. Given the age of the building and the reduced number of friars, the cost of maintenance, rehabilitation, and staffing would be unsustainable for the province, and negatively impact other ministries elsewhere. Arrangements were made to transfer all students and prospective applicants so interested to Regent's Park College. The decision aroused considerable controversy; substantial proposals by the fellows for the continuation of Greyfriars were considered by the Governing Body. The university eventually indicated that the friars' licence to run Greyfriars as a PPH would not be transferred to any other body, and the hall closed in June 2008, despite a last-minute attempt to save the hall by the Holy See.

It may seem strange that the Greyfriars students did not migrate to St Benet's Hall (the Benedictine PPH) or Blackfriars Hall (the Dominican PPH). However, Greyfriars had some years earlier admitted female students, and at that time neither of these other Catholic PPHs had done so. Regent's Park welcomed the Greyfriars students and the migration is commemorated by a plaque at Regent's Park. The latter announced in 2018 that it would be seeking donations to fund a Greyfriars Scholarship at Regent's. St Benet's Hall closed in 2022

The Capuchin Order has stated that it will continue to exist at Greyfriars in Oxford and the premises will continue to operate as a friary; the order will maintain responsibility for the parish.

At the time of Greyfriars' closure, the Visitor was Mauro Jöhri, Minister General, the Warden was Mark Elvins, and the fellows included Aidan Nichols, John Paul II Lecturer in Roman Catholic Theology. The immediate previous Warden was Nicholas Richardson (2004-2007). Honorary Fellows included Thomas G. Weinandy (Warden 1993–2004), and Vincent Nichols, RC Archbishop of Birmingham. Among earlier Wardens who were members of the Capuchin order, the highly respected musical scholar Peter Peacock (an Oxford D.Mus. who then became Professor of Music at Loyola University New Orleans) and then Cassian Reel served for long periods with distinction.

== Friary and tuition ==
Greyfriars occupied an uncommon position in Oxford, in that its University Hall and Franciscan friary were part of the same institution and coexisted on the same site—however, the friars were not usually members of the academic hall (though this was not without exception), nor were the students actually affiliated to the friary—the two groups did, however, mingle, most notably at mealtimes. (A similar system operates at Blackfriars, Oxford.) Furthermore, no religious restrictions were placed on applicants; and, while the hall had a tradition of noted theology academics, a wide range of disciplines were studied by students—the most common being English, history, theology, geography and law. Although the hall employed tutors specialising in certain areas of some of these subjects, students generally went to other colleges for the majority of their tutorials. The college most closely linked with Greyfriars was Balliol College, owing to a long-standing tradition of sporting links, but Greyfriars students were tutored at a wide number of the university's colleges at some point.

== Student life ==
While Greyfriars was small in terms of grounds and numbers, it had a close-knit community and a lively academic life. Throughout the late 1990s and early 2000s, undergraduate numbers tended to be around the 30 mark, with an average of between nine and eleven students per year in addition to a handful of visiting and postgraduate students. From around 2003, numbers increased, and the student population of the hall when it closed numbered closer to 50.

The hall annually held a popular summer garden party, and a "bop" that was dubbed 'The Monastery of Sound' in tongue-in-cheek acknowledgement of the friars. Greyfriars was also influential in the Oxford Law Society, the Conservative Association, the Dramatic Society, and the Indie Music Society, as well as rowing, hockey, rugby, tennis and table tennis.

As with all Oxford colleges, Greyfriars' student community was a JCR, run by an elected committee.

== Notable former members of the First Foundation ==
- Hamo of Faversham (d. 1244)
- Alexander of Hales, Doctor Irrefragabilis (c. 1170–1245)
- Adam Marsh, MA (d. 1258)
- Robert Grosseteste (c. 1175–1253)
- Roger Bacon, DD, Doctor Mirabilis (c. 1214–1292)
- John of Peckham, DD, (c. 1225/30–1292)
- Thomas Docking (died 1270)
- John Duns Scotus, BD, DD, Doctor Subtilis (c. 1264–1309)
- William of Occam, DD, Doctor Invincibilis (c. 1300–1394)
- Antipope Alexander V (c. 1339 – May 3, 1410)

Among the early Wardens was:

- Richard Roderham, medieval churchman (1433–1440)

== Burials ==
- Beatrice of Falkenburg, Queen of Germany
- Sir John Golafre

== Greyfriars Society ==
The Greyfriars Society was established in 1999 and is the official alumni organisation of Greyfriars. The main objectives of the society are to maintain and build relationships with the Hall's alumni and were also to raise money to enable Greyfriars to provide the best possible education for the growing student body. The first Patron was the late Cormac Murphy-O'Connor, Cardinal-Archbishop emeritus of Westminster, and the President is David Alton.
