= Tate & Lyle =

British-based multinational agribusiness

Tate & Lyle Plc
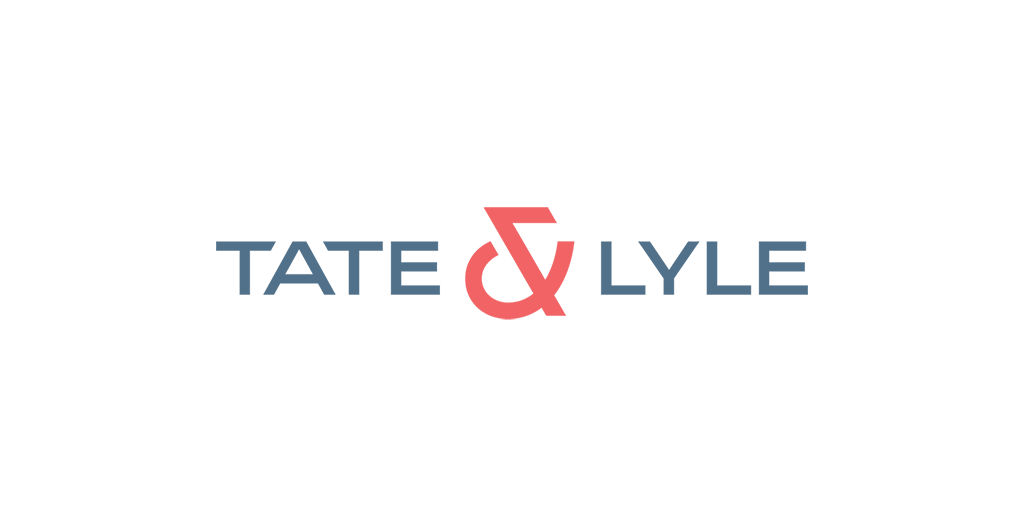
- Formerly: Henry Tate & Sons (1903) Limited (1903–1904); Henry Tate & Sons Limited (1904–1921); Tate & Lyle, Limited (1921–1981)
- Type: Public limited company
- Traded as: LSE: TATE; FTSE 250 component
- Industry: Food processing
- Founded: 27 February 1903; 123 years ago (as Henry Tate & Sons (1903) Limited); 31 August 1921; 105 years ago (renamed to Tate & Lyle, Limited)
- Headquarters: London, England, United Kingdom
- Key people: David Hearn, Chairman; Nick Hampton, CEO
- Products: Starches; Splenda
- Revenue: ▲£2,006 million (2026)
- Operating income: ▲£180 million (2026)
- Net income: ▼£98 million (2026)
- Number of employees: Just under 5,000 people (2006)
- Website: tateandlyle.com

Tate & Lyle Plc is a British multinational supplier of diverse food and beverage products to food and industrial markets. It was originally a sugar refining business, but from the 1970s, it began to diversify, eventually divesting its sugar business in 2010. It is listed on the London Stock Exchange as a constituent of the FTSE 250 Index.

== History ==
=== Sugar refining ===
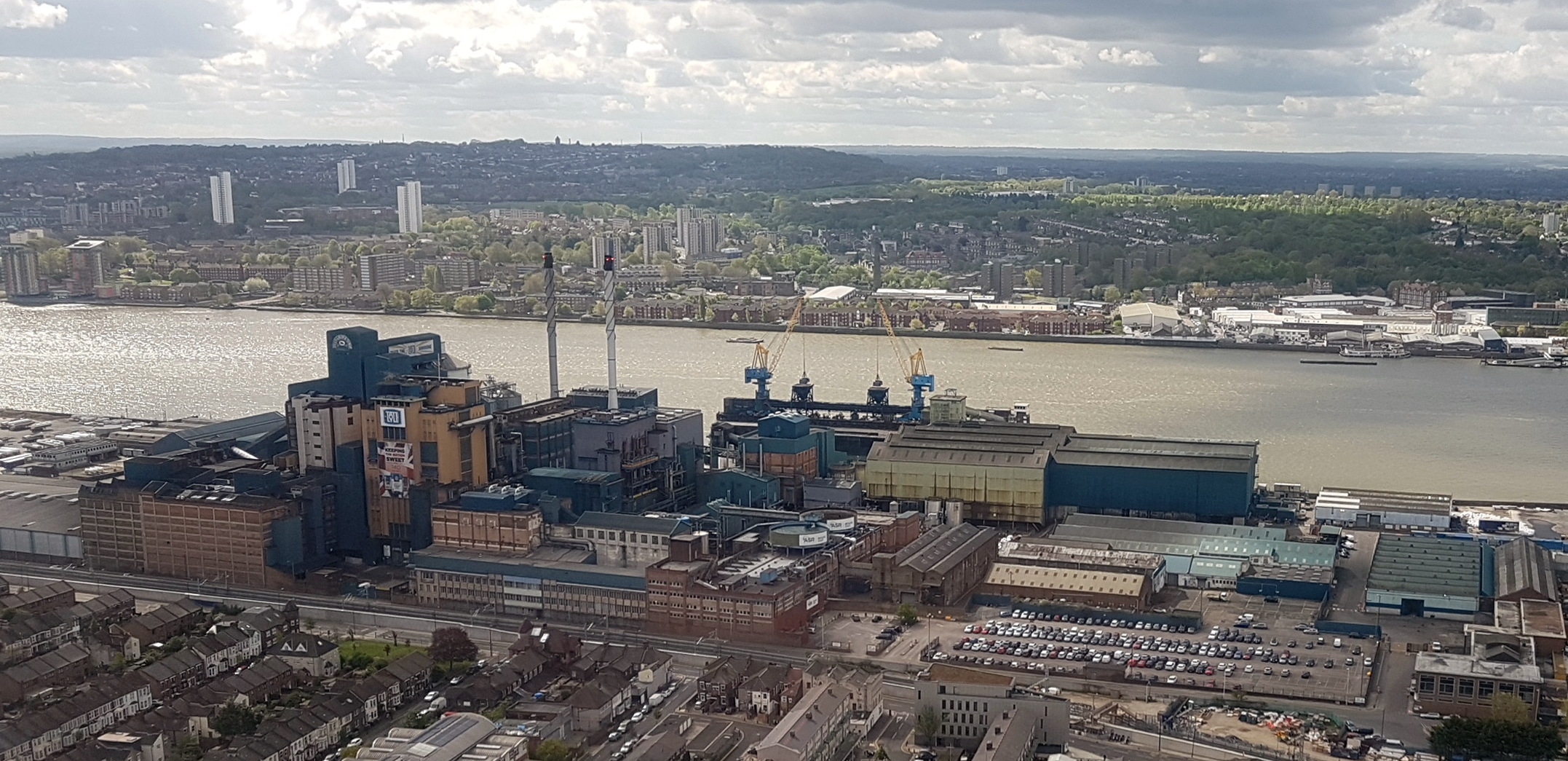
Tate & Lyle PLC refinery along the Thames in Silvertown, London

In 1859 grocery-store magnate Henry Tate sold his stores and became a partner in the John Wright & Co. sugar refinery in Liverpool. The Tate–Wright partnership ended in 1869, and Tate's two sons Alfred and Edwin joined the business, forming Henry Tate & Sons. They opened a new refinery in Love Lane, Liverpool in 1872. In 1875 Tate acquired exclusive technology rights in Britain to the production of sugar cubes, which had been developed in Switzerland and Germany, and thereby introduced cube sugar to the UK. In 1878 the company opened Thames Refinery in Silvertown in East London.

In 1865 Abram Lyle, a cooper and shipowner, acquired an interest in Glebe Sugar Refinery in Greenock, Scotland. After the principal partner, John Kerr, died in 1872, Lyle sold his shares and looked for a site for a new refinery. In 1883 Abram Lyle & Sons started melting sugar at Plaistow Refinery, West Silvertown, London, just 1.5 miles from Henry Tate & Son's Thames Refinery. The two men were bitter business rivals, although they never met in person.

After opening his sugar-melting factory in 1883, Lyle's Golden Syrup was an instant hit and Lyle's company was soon selling a tonne a week. In 1888 Lyle's Golden Syrup introduced a logo of a dead lion surrounded by a swarm of bees, illustrating the biblical story of Samson, with the quotation "out of the strong came forth sweetness". The logo, which holds the Guinness World Record for the world's oldest unchanged brand packaging, was kept for most products until 2024, when it was replaced with a lion's head and a single bee. The original logo was maintained for Lyle's Golden Syrup tins.

Lyle died in 1891, and Tate died in 1899; their sons carried on their companies. The Tate company was officially incorporated in 1903 as Henry Tate & Sons (1903) Limited. In 1921, the two rival sugar refiners merged after the deaths of both of their founders, and the company was renamed to Tate & Lyle, Limited; at the time, the combined company refined around 50% of the UK's sugar.

In 1949, the company introduced its "Mr Cube" brand, as part of a marketing campaign to help it fight a proposed nationalisation by the Labour government.

=== Diversification ===
From 1973, British membership of the European Economic Community threatened Tate & Lyle's core business, with quotas imposed from Brussels favouring domestic sugar beet producers over imported cane refiners such as Tate & Lyle. As a result, under the joint leadership of John O. Lyle and Saxon Tate (direct descendants of Abram Lyle and Henry Tate respectively), the company began to diversify into related fields of commodity trading, transport and engineering, and in 1976, it acquired competing cane sugar refiner Manbré & Garton.

In 1976, the company acquired a 33% stake (increased to 63% in 1988) in Amylum, a European starch-based manufacturing business. The Liverpool sugar plant closed in 1981, and the Greenock plant closed in 1997. In 1988, Tate & Lyle acquired a 90% stake in A. E. Staley, a US corn processing business. In 1998 it brought Haarmann & Reimer, a citric acid producer. In 2000, it acquired the remaining minorities of Amylum and A. E. Staley.

In 2004, it established a joint venture with DuPont to manufacture Bio-PDO, a renewably produced 1,3-Propanediol used to make DuPont's Sorona fabric. In 2005, DuPont Tate & Lyle BioProducts was created as a joint venture between DuPont and Tate & Lyle. In 2006, it acquired Hycail, a small Dutch business, giving the company intellectual property and a pilot plant to manufacture Polylactic acid (PLA), another bio-plastic. In October 2007, five European starch and alcohol plants, previously part of the European starch division known as Amylum group, were sold to Syral, a subsidiary of French sugar company Tereos. Syral closed its Greenwich Peninsula plant in London in September 2009, and it was subsequently demolished.

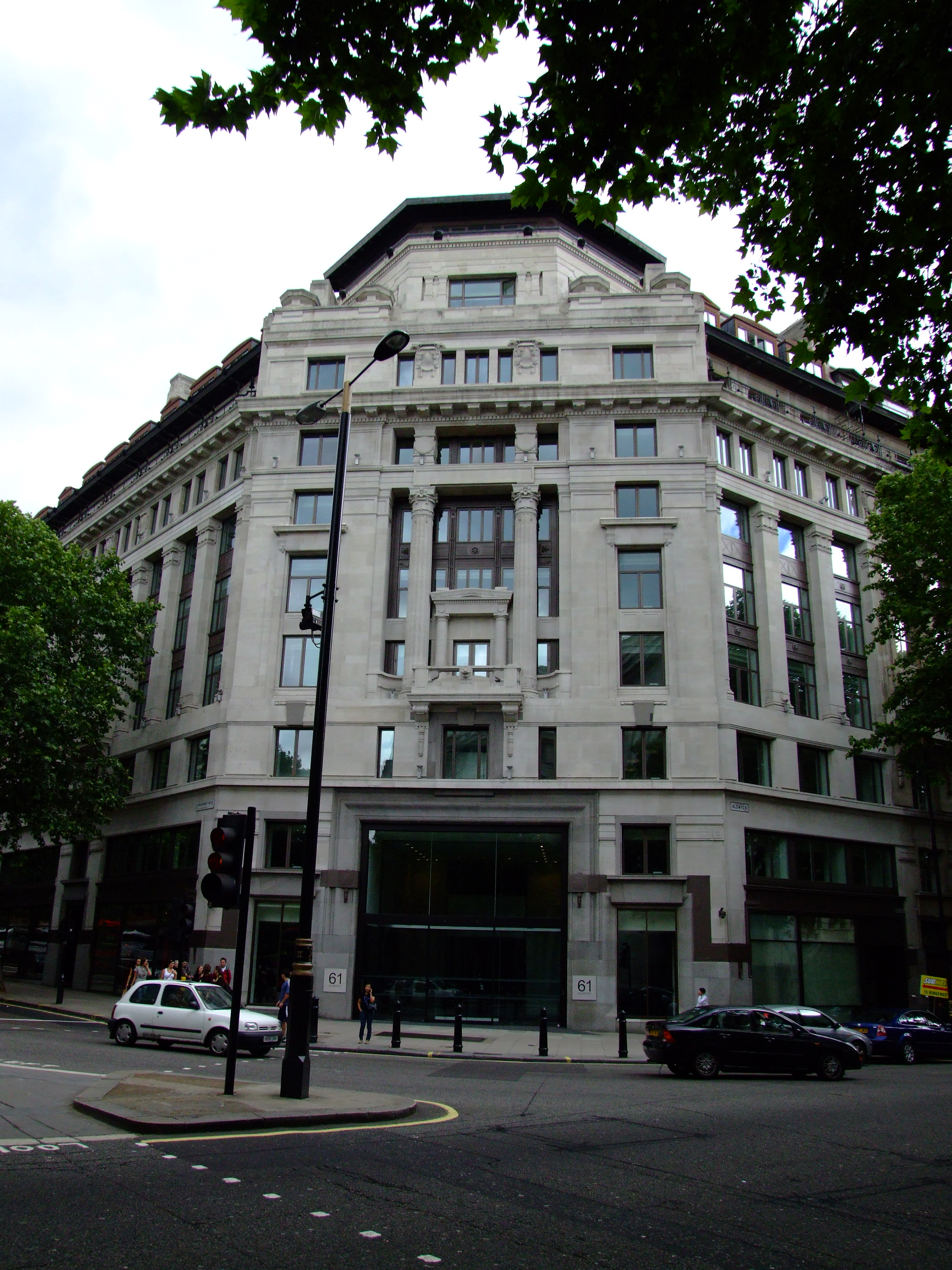
Tate & Lyle head office in Kingsway, London

In February 2008, it was announced that Tate & Lyle granulated white cane sugar would be accredited as a Fairtrade product, with all the company's other retail products to follow in 2009.

In April 2009, the United States International Trade Commission affirmed a ruling that Chinese manufacturers can make copycat versions of its Splenda product.

=== Disposal of sugar refining business ===
In July 2010, the company announced the sale of its sugar refining business, including rights to use the Tate & Lyle brand name and Lyle's Golden Syrup, to American Sugar Refining (owned by sugar barons the Fanjul brothers) for £211 million. The sale included the Plaistow Wharf and Silvertown plants. The new owners pledged that there would be no job losses as a result of the transaction.

=== Recent history ===
In 2012, HarperCollins published The Sugar Girls, a work of narrative non-fiction based on the true stories of women who worked at Tate & Lyle's two factories in the East End of London from the 1940s to the 1960s. A follow up book, The Sugar Girls of Love Lane, released in 2024, was centered on the women who worked at the Liverpool factory.

Nick Hampton became CEO on 1 April 2018, replacing Javed Ahmed, who stepped down from this role and from the board, and retired from the company.

Tate & Lyle developed a method to commercially produce the natural sweetener allulose. It emerged in August 2019 that the company was seeking to take advantage of the 2019 permission from the U.S. Food and Drug Administration to not list the product in total sugar or as an added sugar in commercial food ingredients.

In July 2021, Tate & Lyle announced it was spinning off its Primary Products business in North America and Latin America, and its interests in the Almidones Mexicanos S.A de C.V and DuPont Tate & Lyle Bio-Products Company, LLC joint ventures. These divisions and interests were renamed Primient, and a controlling interest was sold to KPS Capital Partners. Tate & Lyle maintain 49.9% ownership of Primient and the remaining 50.1% is owned by KPS Capital Partners (including board and management control). The transaction was completed in April 2022.

In September 2021, Tate & Lyle ranked fourth in the Modified Starch category of FoodTalks' Global Food Thickener Companies list.

In May 2022, it was announced that Tate & Lyle had acquired Nutriati, an ingredient technology company developing and producing chickpea protein and flour.

In June 2022, it was announced that Tate & Lyle had completed the acquisition of Quantum Hi-Tech (Guangdong) Biological Co., Ltd (Quantum), a prebiotic dietary fibre business located in China.

In January 2023, Tate & Lyle announced a rebrand, including a new logo and typography, new imagery and a new narrative: science, solutions, society.

In June 2024, Tate & Lyle announced that the company has signed an agreement to acquire CP Kelco, a provider of pectin and speciality gums, from J.M. Huber, a large US-based family-owned corporation.

In June 2026, the company announced it had agreed to be acquired by Ingredion for £2.7 billion. The deal is subject to shareholder and regulatory approval.

== Operations ==
A Tate & Lyle tank car carrying corn syrup

As of 2025, the company's key areas of expertise are:

- Beverages
- Dairy products
- Soups, sauces, and dressings
- Bakery items and snacks
- Confectionery
- Meat and seafood
- Personal care products
- Household products
- Clinical nutrition
- Industrial products

== See also ==
- Splenda, sugar substitute developed by Tate & Lyle
- Redpath Sugar, former subsidiary
