= Nicholas Richardson =

English classical scholar

Nicholas James Richardson is a British Classical scholar and formerly Warden of Greyfriars, Oxford, from 2004 until 2007.

Nicholas Richardson was educated at Magdalen College, Oxford (Honour Moderations in Literae Humaniores first class, Final Honour School of Literae Humaniores first class, BPhil, DPhil). From 1960 until 1961 he was a student of ancient historian G.E.M. de Ste Croix, and contributed to his festschrift entitled Crux.

He was appointed Lecturer at Pembroke and Trinity and in 1968 Fellow and Tutor in Classics of Merton. He was Chairman of the University-wide Tutors for Graduates Committee 1988–93, Governor of Plater College 1993–99, and Sub-Warden of Merton 1998–2000. He became Warden of Greyfriars in 2004. He was the first layperson to hold that office. He retired in 2007. He is now an emeritus Fellow of Merton.

Richardson was elected a Fellow of the Society of Antiquaries in 1985.

He was a long-time friend of bishop Richard Williamson, having defended the bishop in 2009 amidst the controversy surrounding his denial of the Holocaust.

== Publications ==
- The Homeric hymns, trans. Jules Cashford; introduction and notes Nicholas Richardson (London: Penguin, 2003)
- Nicholas Richardson et al., La philologie grecque à l'époque hellénistique et romaine: sept exposés suivis de discussions, Vandoevres, Genève, 16-21 août 1993: entretiens préparés et présidés par Franco Montanari (Entretiens sur l'Antiquité classique t. 40, Genève: Vandœuvres, 1994)
- Nicholas Richardson, The Iliad: a commentary, vol. 6: books 21-24 (Cambridge: Cambridge University Press, 1993)
- Nicholas Richardson, 'The individuality of Homer's language', in J.M. Bremer, I.J.F. de Jong, and J. Kalff, eds, Homer: beyond oral poetry: recent trends in Homeric interpretation (Amsterdam: B.R. Grüner, 1987), pp. 165–184
- Nicholas Richardson, 'Classical themes in modern Chian popular poetry', in John Boardman and C.E. Vaphopoulou-Richardson, eds, Chios: a conference at the Homereion in Chios 1984 (Oxford: Clarendon Press, 1986), pp. 61–77
- Nicholas Richardson, 'Pindar and later literary criticism in antiquity', Papers of the Liverpool Latin Seminar 5 (1985), 383–401
- Nicholas Richardson, 'Recognition scenes in the Odyssey and ancient literary criticism', Papers of the Liverpool Latin Seminar 4 (1983), 219–235
- Nicholas Richardson, 'Hesiod's wagon: text and technology', Journal of Hellenic Studies 102 (1982), 225–230
- Nicholas Richardson, 'The contest of Homer and Hesiod and Alcidamas' Mouseion', Classical Quarterly 31 (1981), 1–10
- Nicholas Richardson, 'Literary criticism in the exegetical Scholia to the Iliad: a sketch', Classical Quarterly 30 (1980), 265–287
- Nicholas Richardson, ed., The Homeric hymn to Demeter (Oxford: Clarendon Press, 1974; corrected edn 1979)
- Nicholas Richardson, 'Homeric professors in the age of the sophists', Proceedings of the Cambridge Philological Society 201 (1975), 65–81
- Nicholas Richardson, A commentary on the Homeric hymn to Demeter (3 vols, University of Oxford DPhil thesis, 1970)

== Sources and further information ==
- University of Oxford Annual Review 2003/4: Heads of Houses.
- Greyfriars Hall, Oxford University: A Warm Welcome.
- Introduction to Creweian Oration, by the Public Orator, 2005.
- Oration by the Vice-Chancellor, Oxford University Gazette, Supplement (3) to no. 4818 Wednesday 3 October 2007, p. 100.
