= Skylink (bus service) =

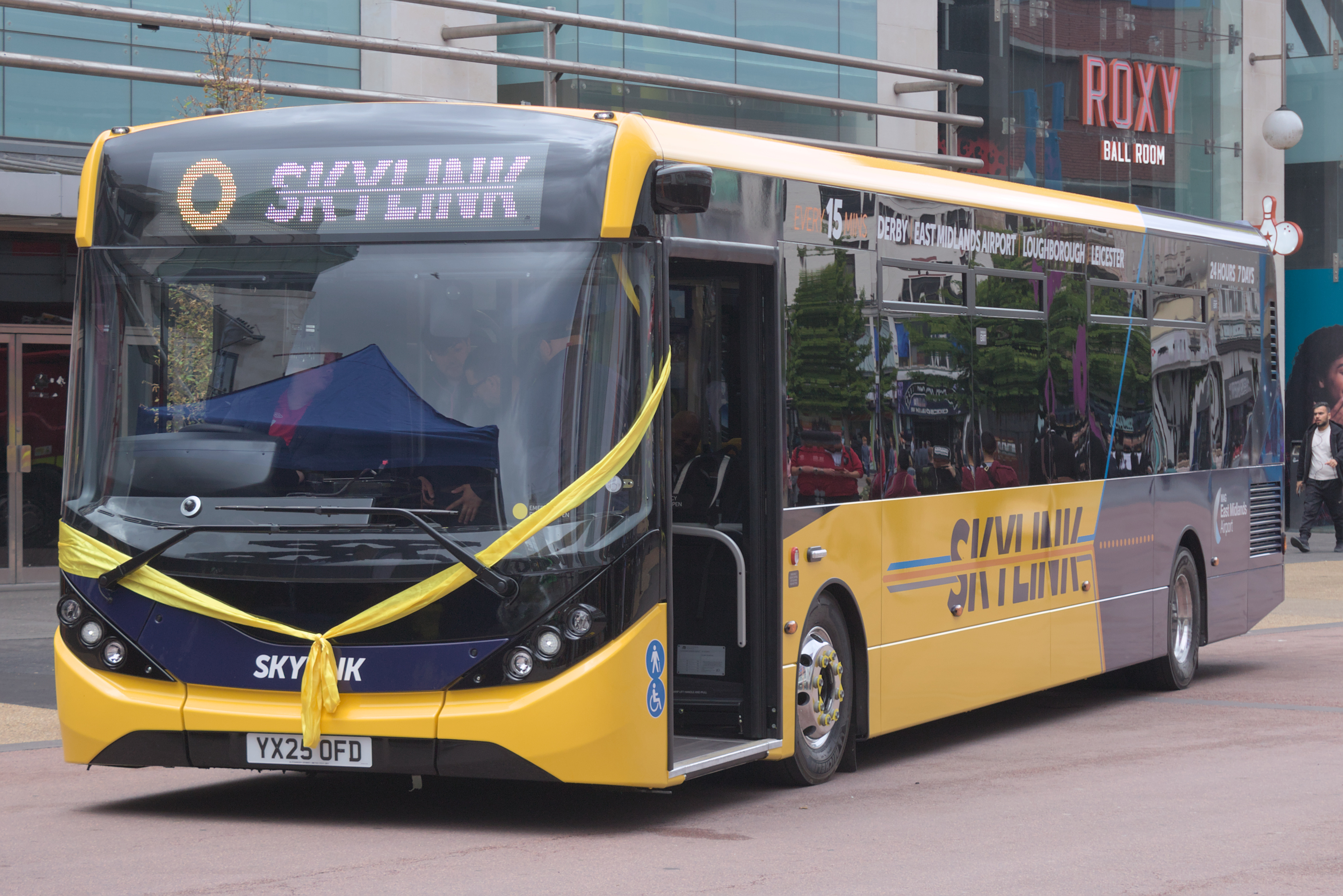
- a Skylink Leicester-Derby branded ADL Enviro200 MMC outside the Haymarket Shopping Centre in Leicester during June 2025
- Founded: 2005 by NCT and Arriva Midlands
- Service area: East Midlands Airport; Nottinghamshire; Leicestershire; Derbyshire
- Service type: Bus services
- Stations: St Margaret's Bus Station; Derby Bus Station; East Midlands Airport
- Depots: Loughborough; Nottingham
- Fleet: 29: Skylink Leicester-Derby; 16 ADL Enviro200 MMCs; Skylink Nottingham; 8 ADL Enviro200 MMCs; Skylink Express; 3 Wright Eclipse Urban-bodied Volvo B7RLE
- Fuel type: diesel
- Operator: Kinchbus; Trentbarton
- Website: www.trentbarton.co.uk/services/skylinkwww.kinchbus.co.uk/Skylink

Skylink is a brand name for bus services that serve East Midlands Airport in Leicestershire. Services are operated by Kinchbus and Trentbarton, both a part of the Derbyshire-based Wellglade Group.

== History ==
=== Skylink Nottingham ===
Nottingham City Transport previously operated the Skylink Nottingham service until 2012 when the service was replaced by a new Skylink service operated by trentbarton via Long Eaton, which also replaced the indigo service between Long Eaton and Loughborough via East Midlands Airport and Sutton Bonington that ran between 2002 and 2012.

The service operates from Nottingham, passing through Dunkirk, Beeston, Long Eaton and Castle Donington before arriving at East Midlands Airport. Most journeys continue to serve Pegasus Business Park and East Midlands Gateway, one daytime bus each hour continues to Coalville serving Diseworth, Long Whatton, Shepshed and Thringstone on their way.

Following a local petition, an hourly extension service to Coalville via Shepshed was introduced in September 2015.

=== Skylink Express ===
Skylink Express was introduced in January 2016 to provide faster connections to East Midlands Airport via Clifton Park & Ride hub and A453 Remembrance Way which largely followed the former Nottingham City Transport Skylink Nottingham route which was replaced in 2012. When the route was initially introduced Irizar i4 coaches from the Red Arrow service were used, these were later swapped for Wright Solar's which ran as the last branded vehicles of the type for trentbarton until they were eventually replaced by Wright Eclipse Urban's in the 2020s.

=== Skylink Leicester-Derby ===
Kinchbus have operated the Skylink service between Leicester and Derby since 2008. Prior to 2008, the route was known as AirLine Shuttle, and ran between Loughborough and Long Eaton then Derby via the airport.

Arriva Midlands previously operated a Skylink service between Leicester and the airport via New Parks and the M1 between 2005 and 2009, however this service was replaced by an extension of the Kinchbus Skylink service which operates as a limited stop service from Loughborough via the A6 and Birstall into Leicester, over the later years Kinchbus increased the frequency of the Leicester-Derby service to every 20 minutes in 2014 then in March 2024 the frequency was increased again to every 15 minutes during Monday to Saturday daytimes.

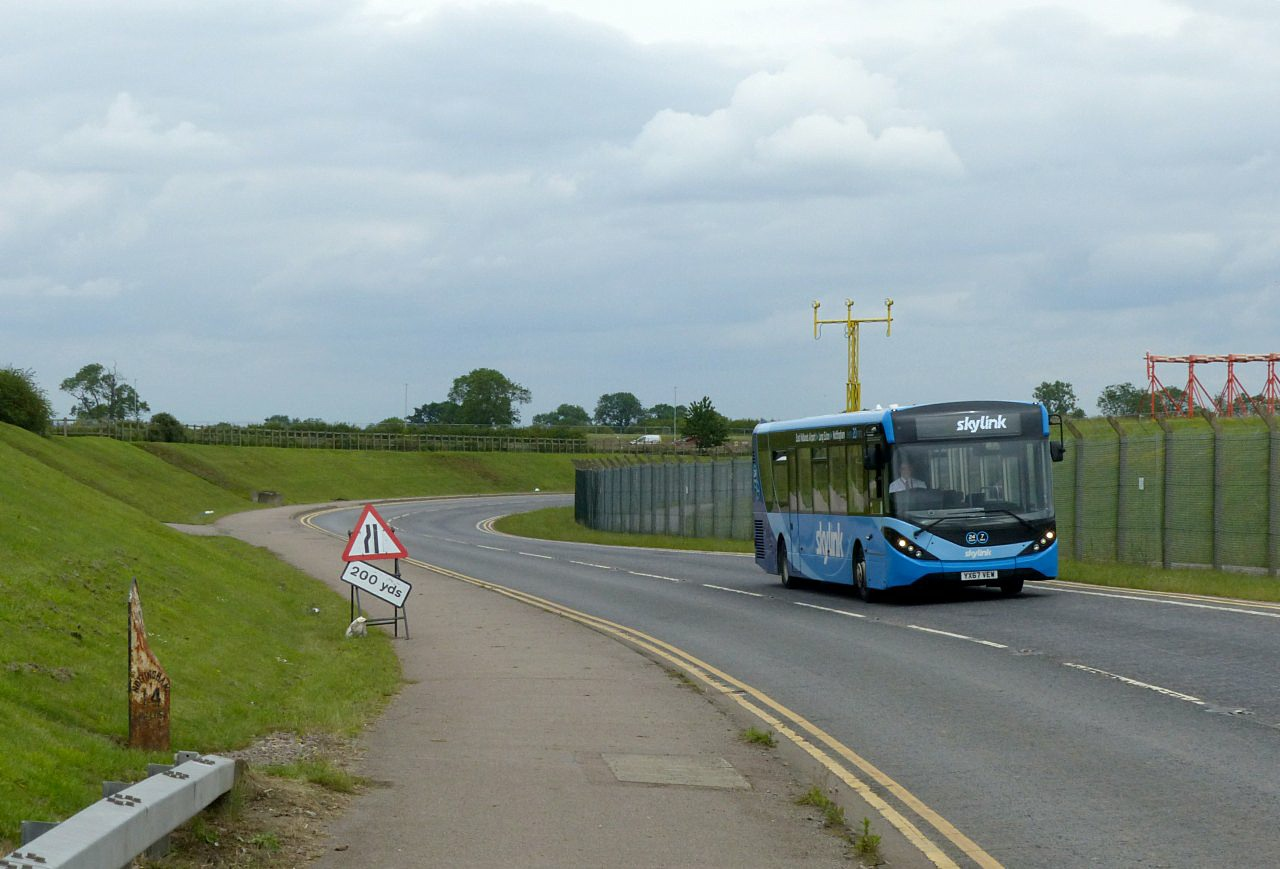
2017 Alexander-Dennis Enviro200MMC in the Skylink Nottingham livery

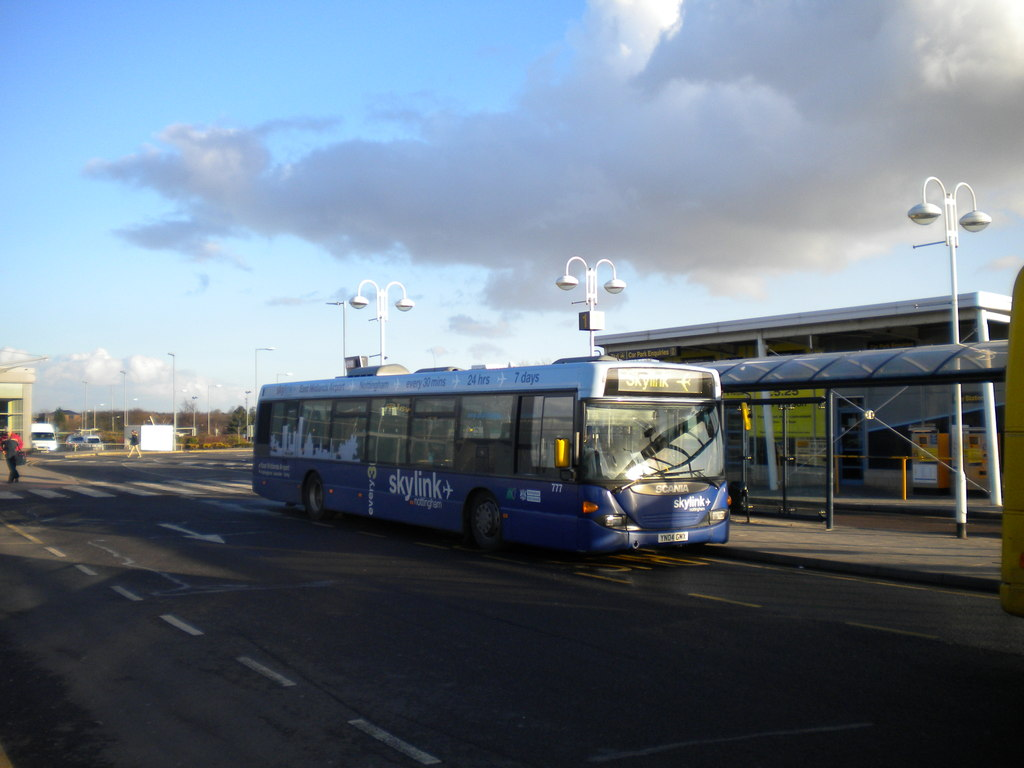
Nottingham City Transport Scania Omnicity formerly used on their Skylink service

=== 2022 service changes ===
During August 2022, Trent Barton and Kinchbus announced from 2 October 2022 that Skylink routes would undergo an overhaul; Skylink Leicester-Derby buses ceased to serve Long Whatton and Diseworth from 3 October 2022. During September 2022, funding from Leicestershire County Council and Nottinghamshire County Council halted plans to withdraw all journeys of the Skylink Nottingham between EMA Gateway and Loughborough alongside journeys between EMA Gateway and Coalville operating overnight between 8pm and 5am would be withdrawn, the funding lasted until April 2023 when the changes were implemented. These were withdrawn from 15 May 2023.

== Services ==
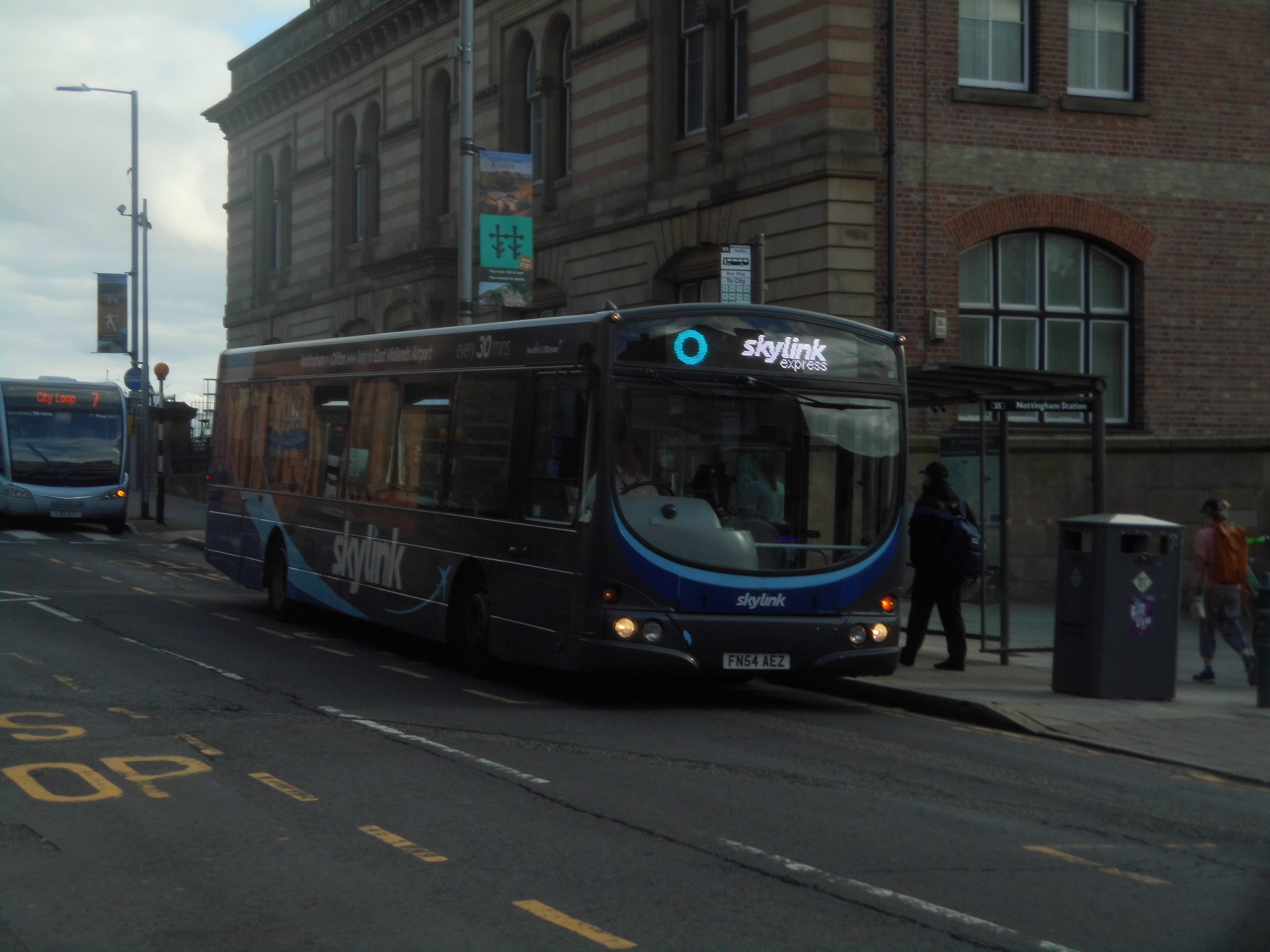
Scania L94UB/Wright Solar in the Skylink Express livery, Carrington Street, Nottingham

Skylink buses operate 24 hours a day 7 days a week on the Leicester/Derby and Nottingham routes, while the Skylink Express buses no longer operate overnight but do operate from around 4am until midnight.

Service	Route
Skylink Leicester-Derby	Leicester (St Margaret's Bus Station) - Birstall - Loughborough - Kegworth - East Midlands Airport - Castle Donington - Shardlow - Alvaston - Derby (Derby Bus Station
Skylink Nottingham	Nottingham Broadmarsh bus station - Beeston - Long Eaton - Castle Donington - East Midlands Airport - some daytime journeys then continue hourly to Coalville via Shepshed; all other journeys terminate at East Midlands Gateway.
Skylink Express	Nottingham - Clifton - fast along Remembrance Way - East Midlands Airport

=== Other Services ===
trentbarton also operate to East Midlands Airport on their My15 route between Ilkeston and New Sawley. Diamond East Midlands extended their service AirLine 9 to East Midlands Airport in 2019, connecting the airport with Ashby-de-la-Zouch, Swadlincote and Burton-upon-Trent.

== Fleet ==
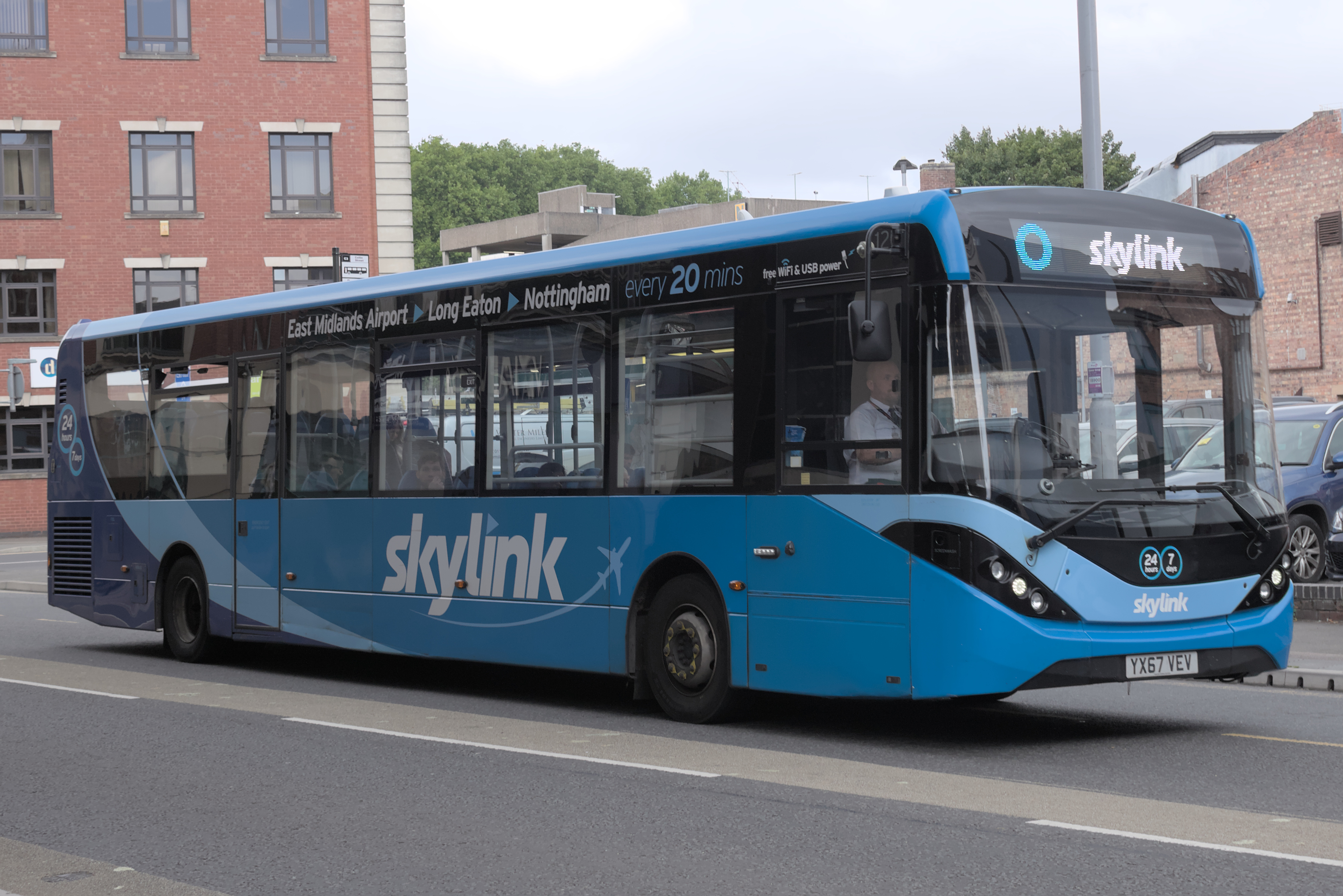
Skylink Nottingham Enviro200 MMC

Skylink Nottingham operates with eight Enviro200 MMC buses, introduced from 2017 the vehicles styled with a light blue body and a dark blue rear section. These vehicles replaced Wright Solar's that previously ran on the route. On 25 March 2025 one of the Nottingham service Enviro 200MMC buses was destroyed in a fire while in Shepshed.

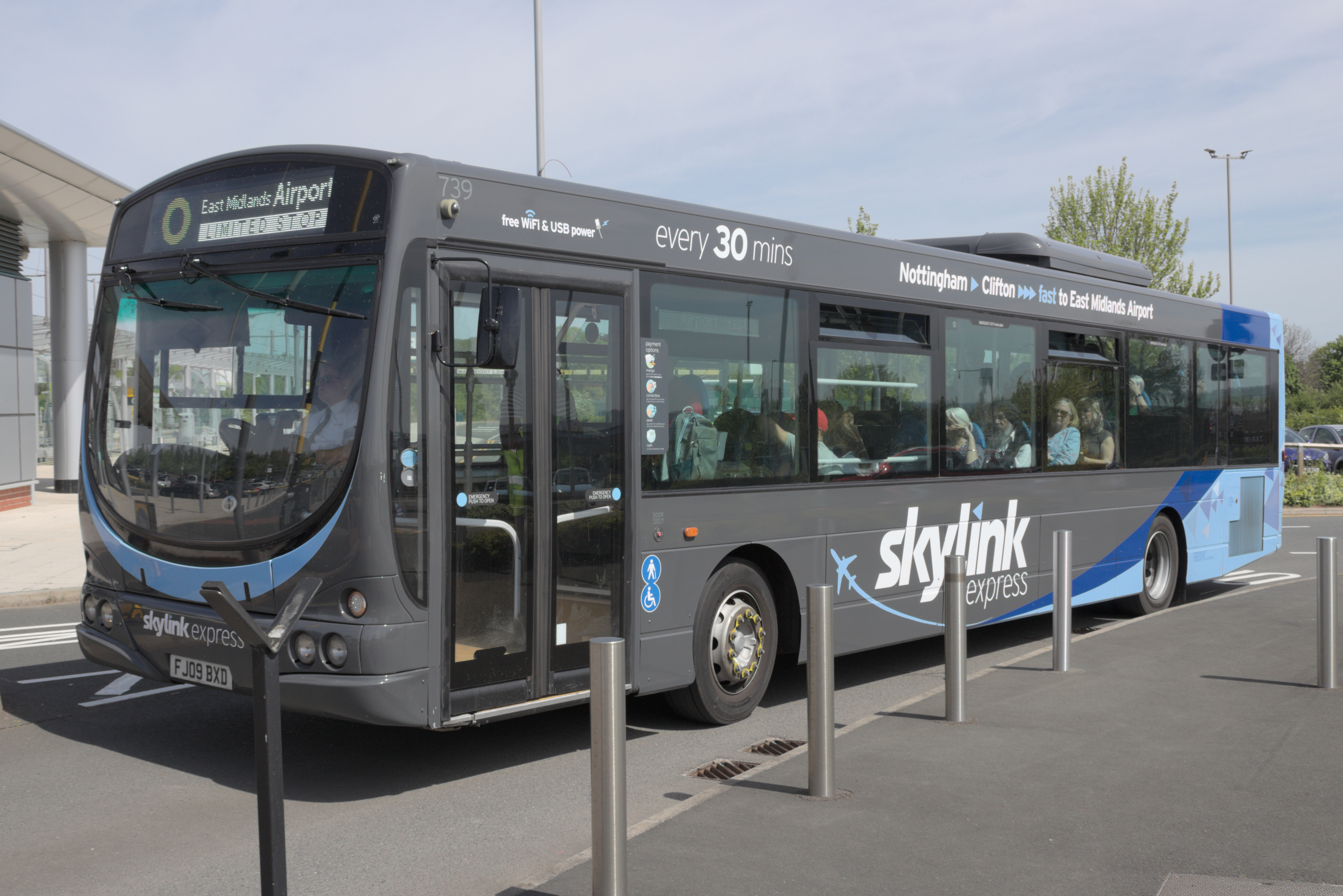
Skylink Express Wright Eclipse Urban

Skylink Express operates with three Wright Eclipse Urban busses, introduced from 2024 the vehicles styled with a grey body and a light blue rear section. These vehicles replaced Wright Solar's that previously ran on the route which were the last branded vehicles of the type in the trentbarton fleet.

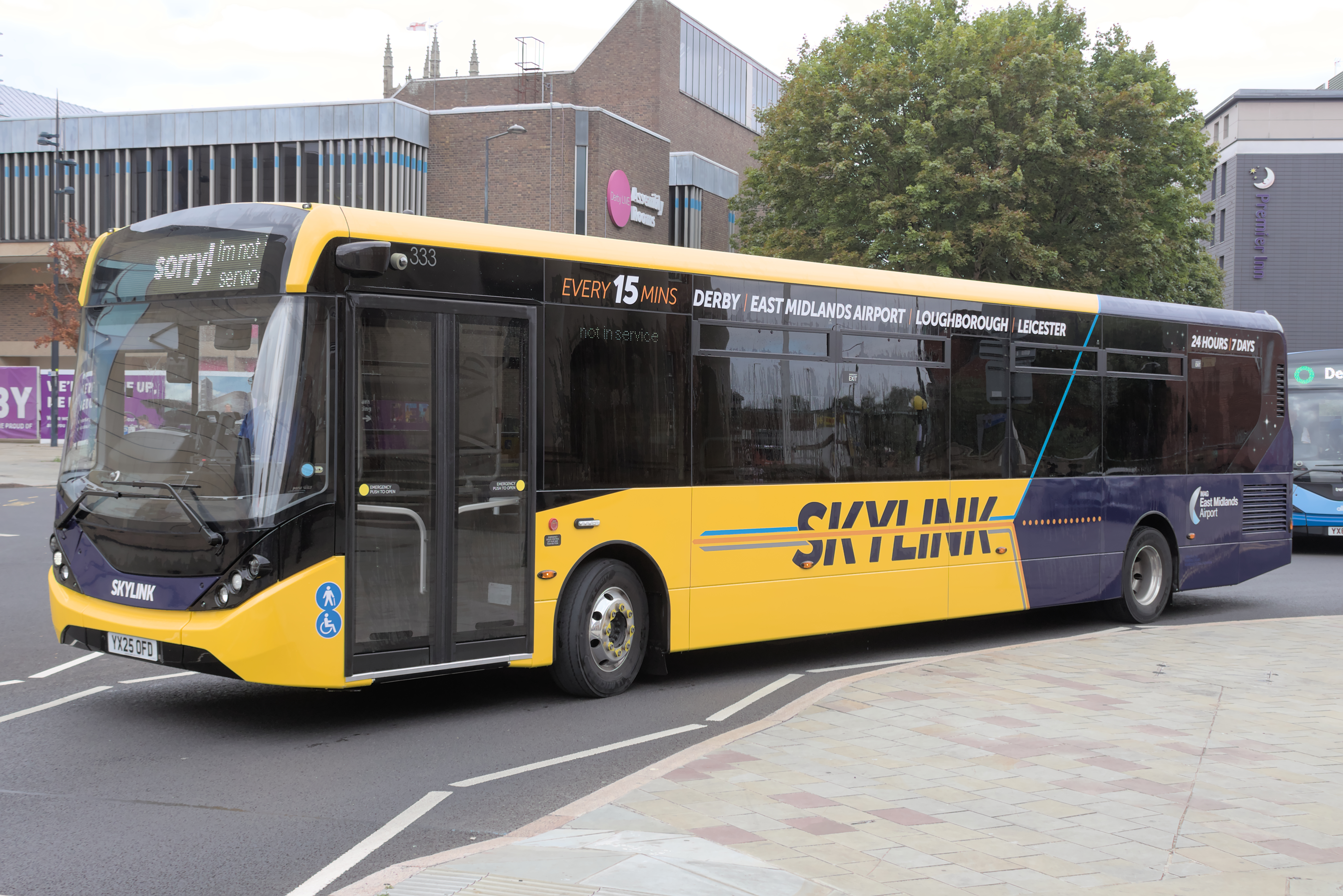
Skylink Derby Enviro200 MMC

Skylink Leicester-Derby operates with sixteen Enviro200 MMC busses, introduced from June 2025 the vehicles styled with a yellow body and a dark blue rear section. These vehicles replaced the twelve buses Enviro200 MMC's that previously ran on the route which were new in 2020.
