= St Margaret's Bus Station =

Bus station in Leicester, England

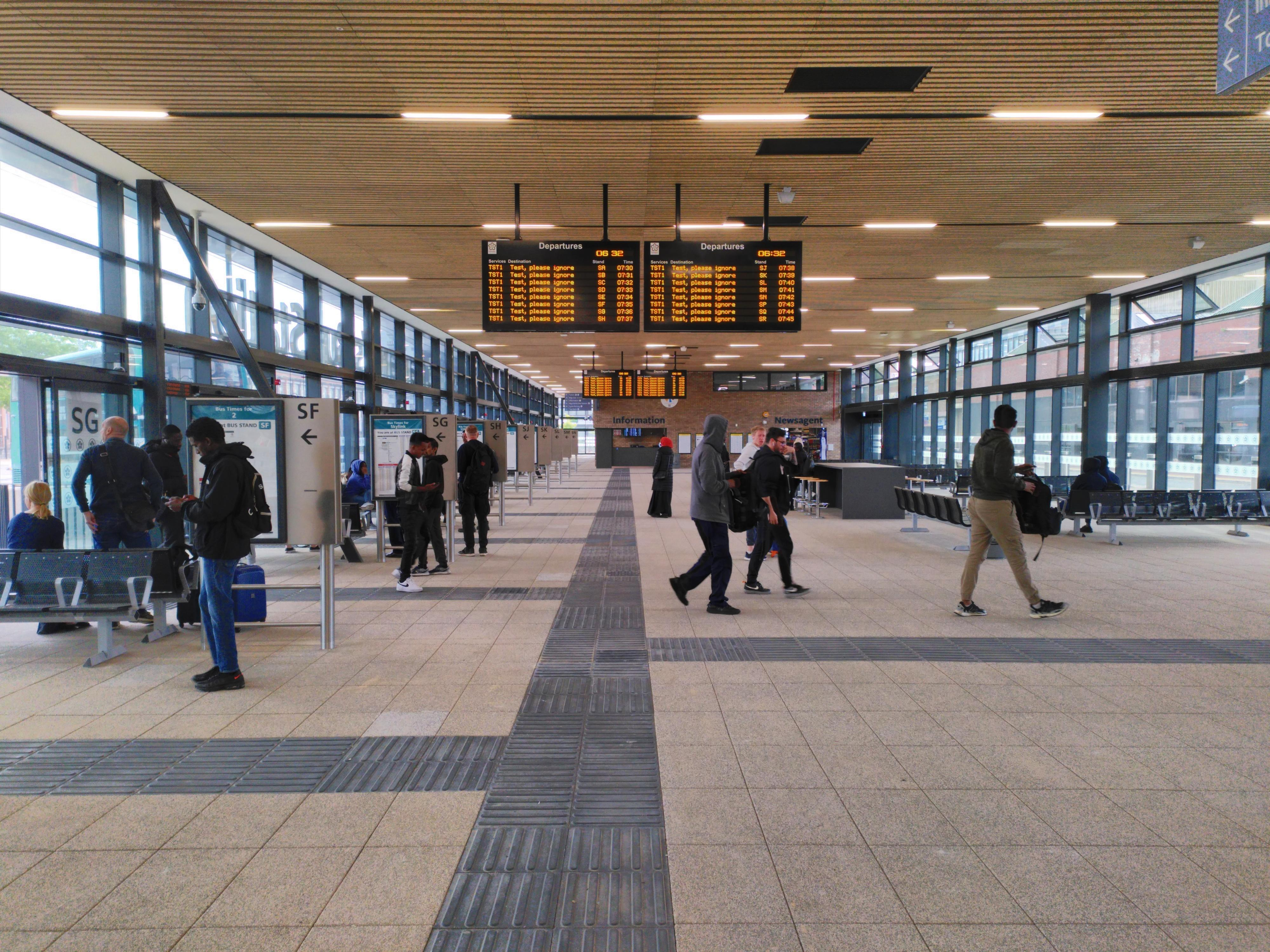

General information
- Location: Gravel Street, Leicester
- Coordinates: 52.6393°N 1.1342°W
- Operator: Leicester City Council; National Express
- Bus routes: 32
- Bus stands: 24
- Bus operators: Arriva Midlands; Central Connect; Centrebus; First Leicester; Kinchbus (Skylink); National Express; New Bharat Coaches; FlixBus
- Connections: National Express; New Bharat Coaches

Construction
- Cycle facilities: Yes
- Accessible: Yes

Other information
- Station code: LEI (for National Express)
- Website: https://www.leicesterbuses.co.uk

History
- Opened: 3 May 1985 (original); 27 June 2022 (redeveloped station)
- Closed: 31 December 2020 (original)
Location

St Margaret's Bus Station is located on Gravel Street to the north of Leicester City Centre, England. It is named after St Margaret's Church, which stands just across Burleys Way.

== History ==
The use of the site as a bus station dates back to the early 1940s. The previous bus station was built in 1985 and at the time was a state-of-the-art arrival and departure point in the city. Councillor Derek Fryett, Chair of the Planning Committee opened it on 3 May 1985. The contractor was Costain Construction. Although considered one of the best stations in the country, Leicester City Council set about a programme of refurbishment in 2006. The major refurbishment was complete in March 2007 and the station was reopened by Councillor Patrick Kitterick on 24 May 2007.

=== Redevelopment ===
As part of a £14.3 million rebuilding scheme a new access road was completed in November 2020 allowing buses to access the A594 ring road directly from the bus station, shortening journey times.

During December 2020, Leicester City Council announced the bus station would close from 31 December for around 18 months to allow for a total redevelopment of the bus station and surrounding roads.

St Margaret's is the first carbon neutral bus station in the United Kingdom. An official opening day was held on Sunday 26 June 2022 by the Mayor of Leicester Sir Peter Soulsby, ahead of bus services returning the following day.

== Services ==
Long-distance coach services operated by National Express operate from the new bus station with a purpose built travel centre and waiting facilities which opened on 5 July 2022.

Bus services serving the bus station are operated by Arriva Midlands, Centrebus, Central Connect, First Leicester and Kinchbus to outlying areas of Leicestershire including: South Wigston, Lutterworth, Rugby, Coventry, Hinckley, Market Bosworth, Coalville, Loughborough, Derby, Birstall, East Midlands Airport, Groby and Ratby.

== Facilities ==
The bus station facilities include a newsagents, cafe, public toilets, information kiosk, bicycle storage area and the National Express travel centre with waiting facilities for passengers.

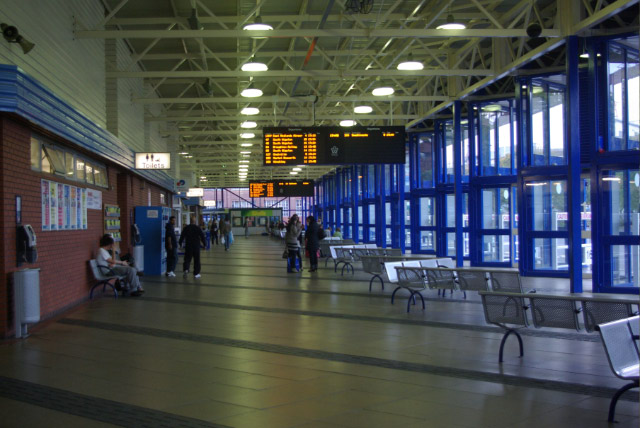
An interior view of the previous station in 2015.

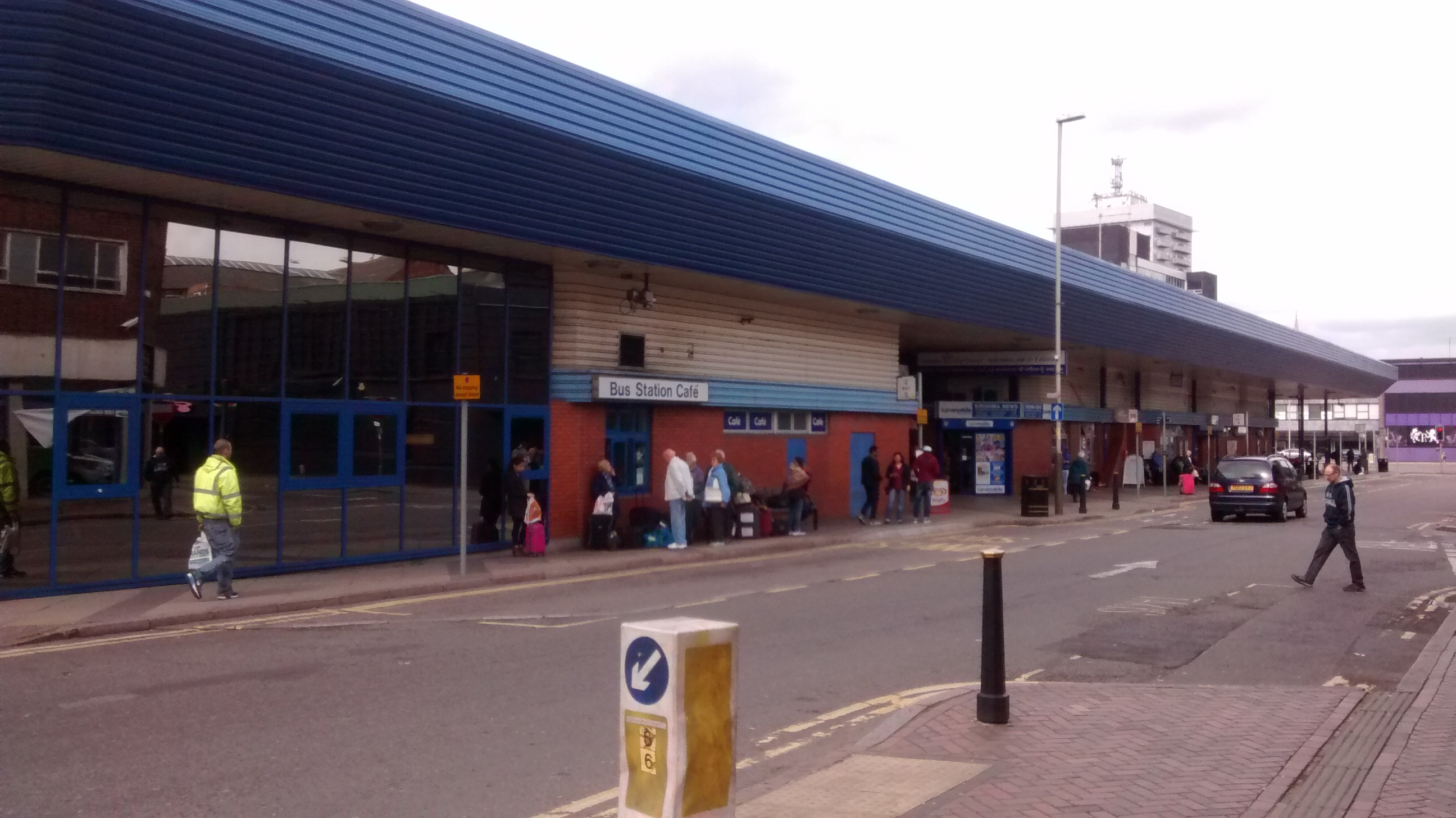
An exterior view of the previous station from Gravel Street in 2015.

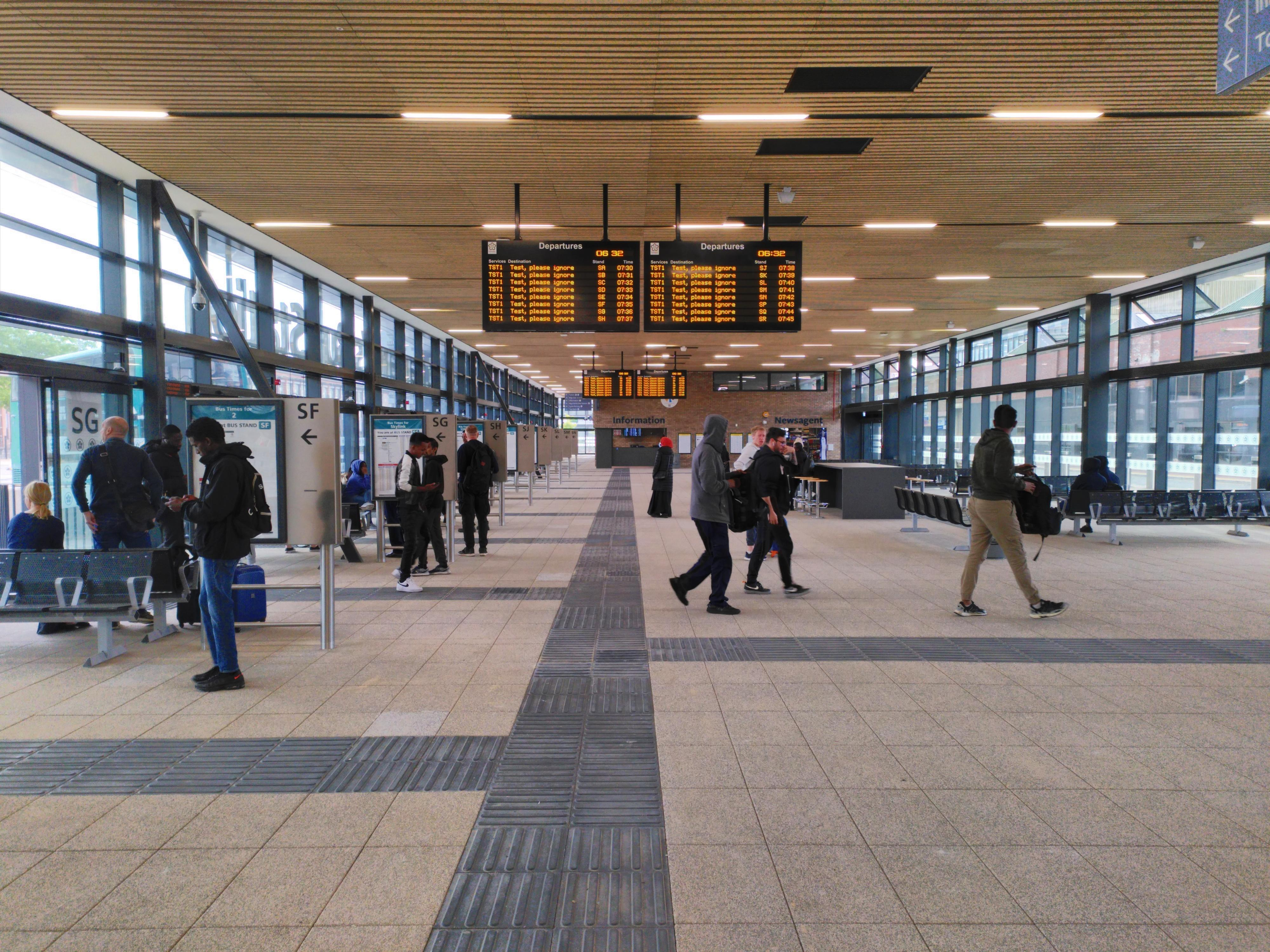
An interior view of the new station in 2022.

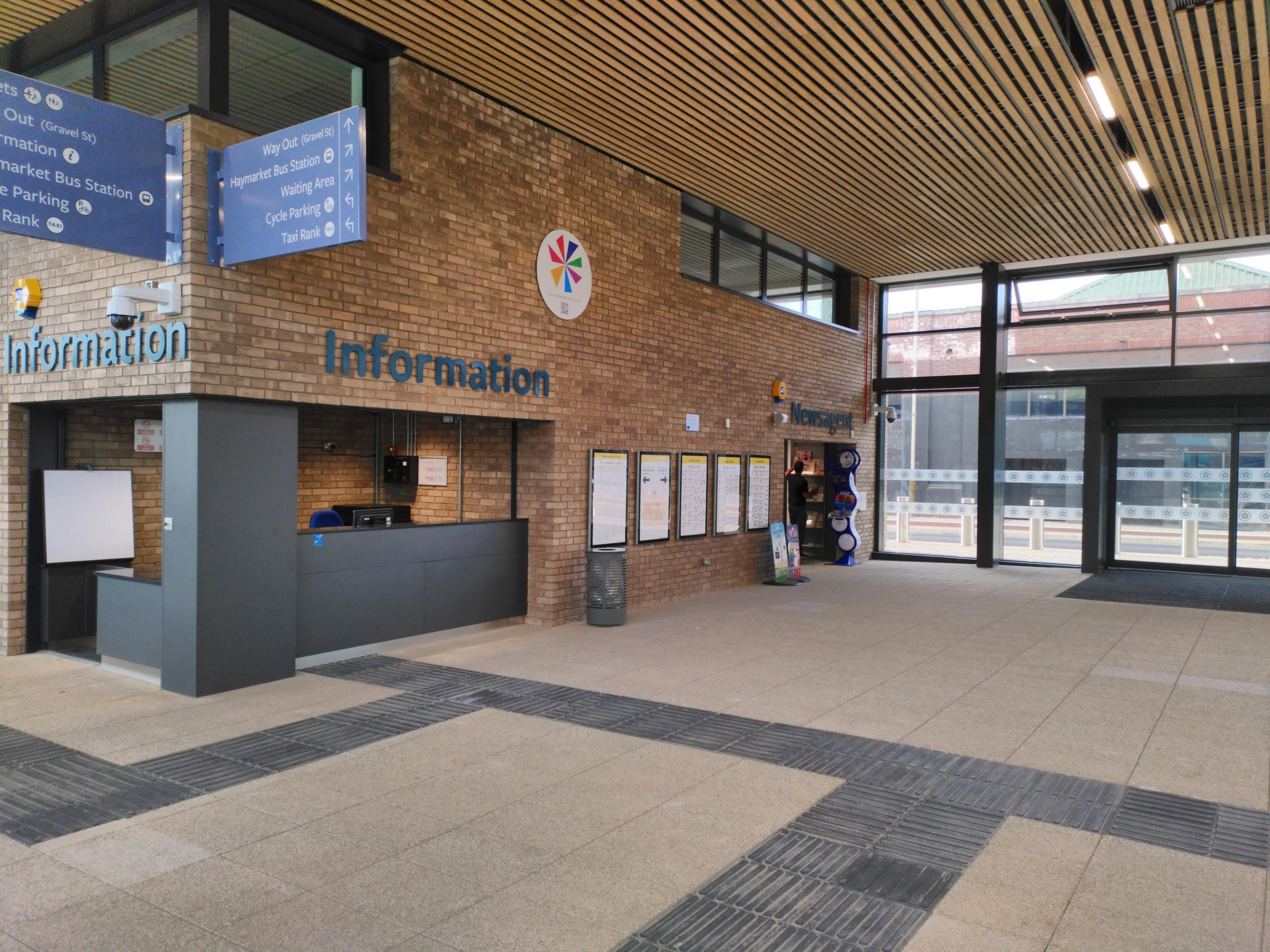
New amenities and signage in the new station.

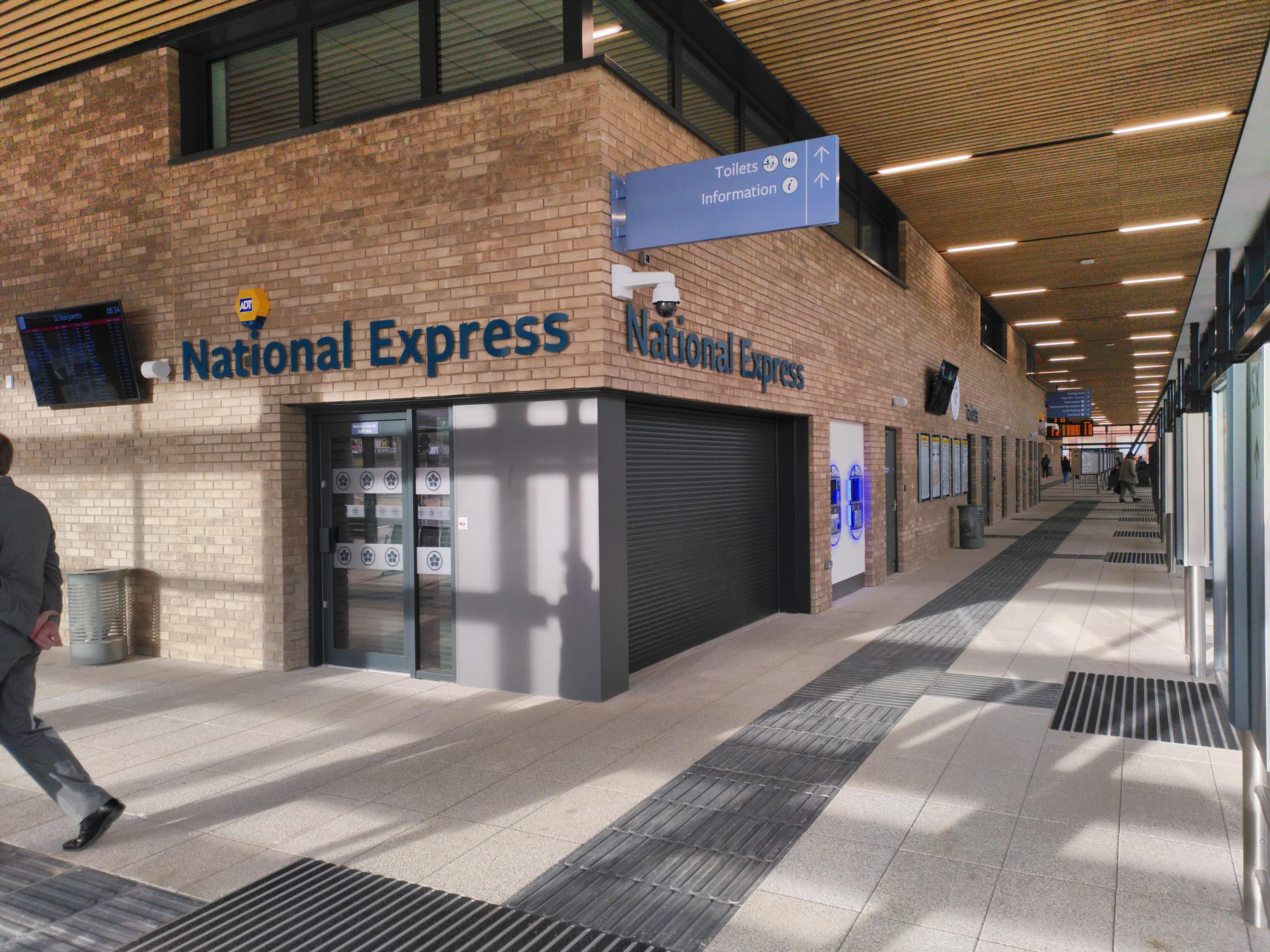
New kiosk in the new station.
