= Kinchbus =

Loughborough bus operator, part of Wellglade

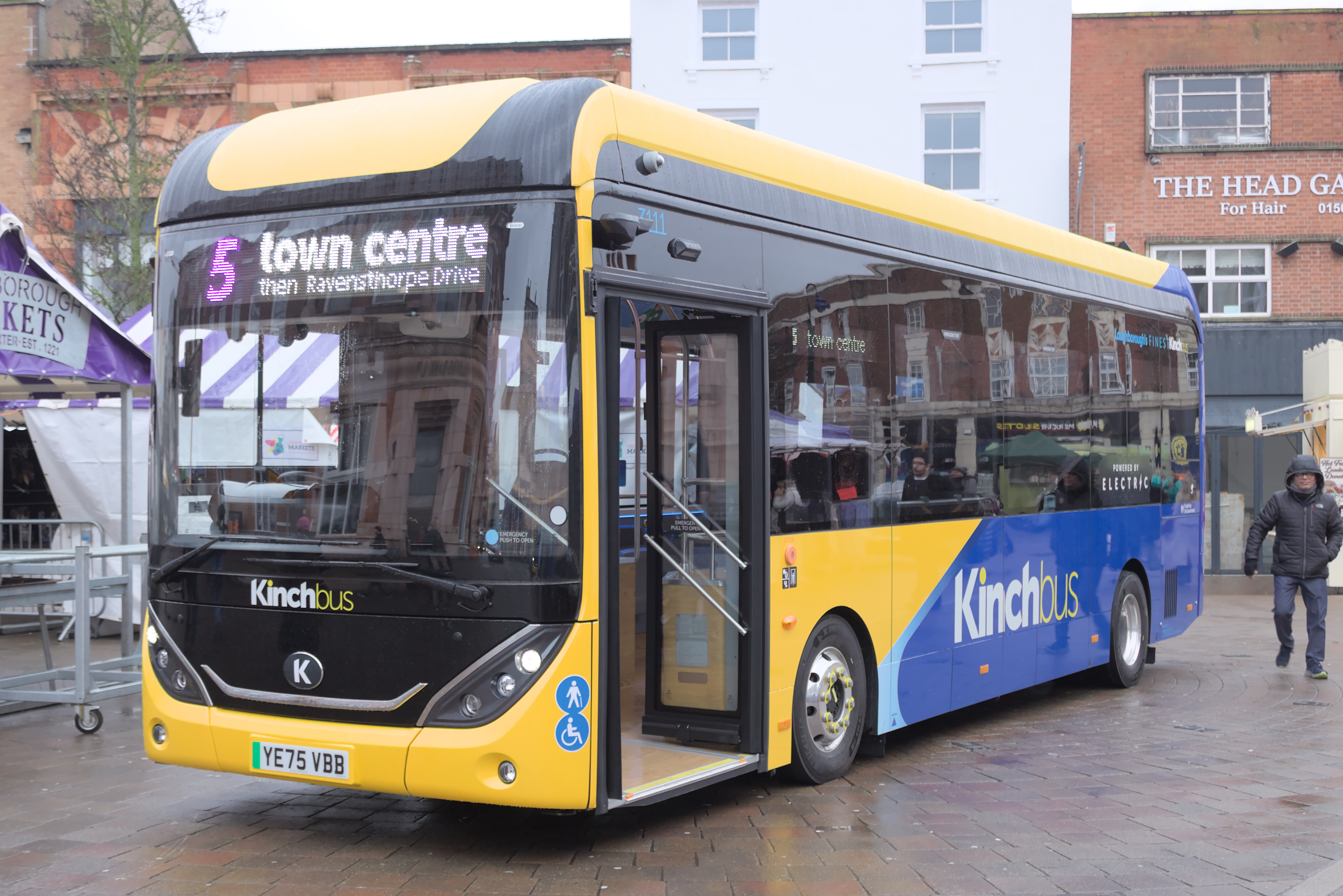
- Yutong E9L in Loughborough in January 2026
- Parent: Wellglade Group
- Founded: 1972 as G.K. Kinch
- Headquarters: Langley Mill
- Service area: Derbyshire; Leicestershire; Nottinghamshire
- Service type: Bus services
- Routes: 9 including (Skylink Leicester-Derby
- Hubs: Loughborough
- Depots: 1
- Fleet: 43 (August 2026)
- Operator: Wellglade Group
- Website: www.kinchbus.co.uk

Kinchbus, formerly G.K. Kinch, is a bus operator in Loughborough, England. Since 1998 it has been a subsidiary of the Wellglade Group.

== History ==
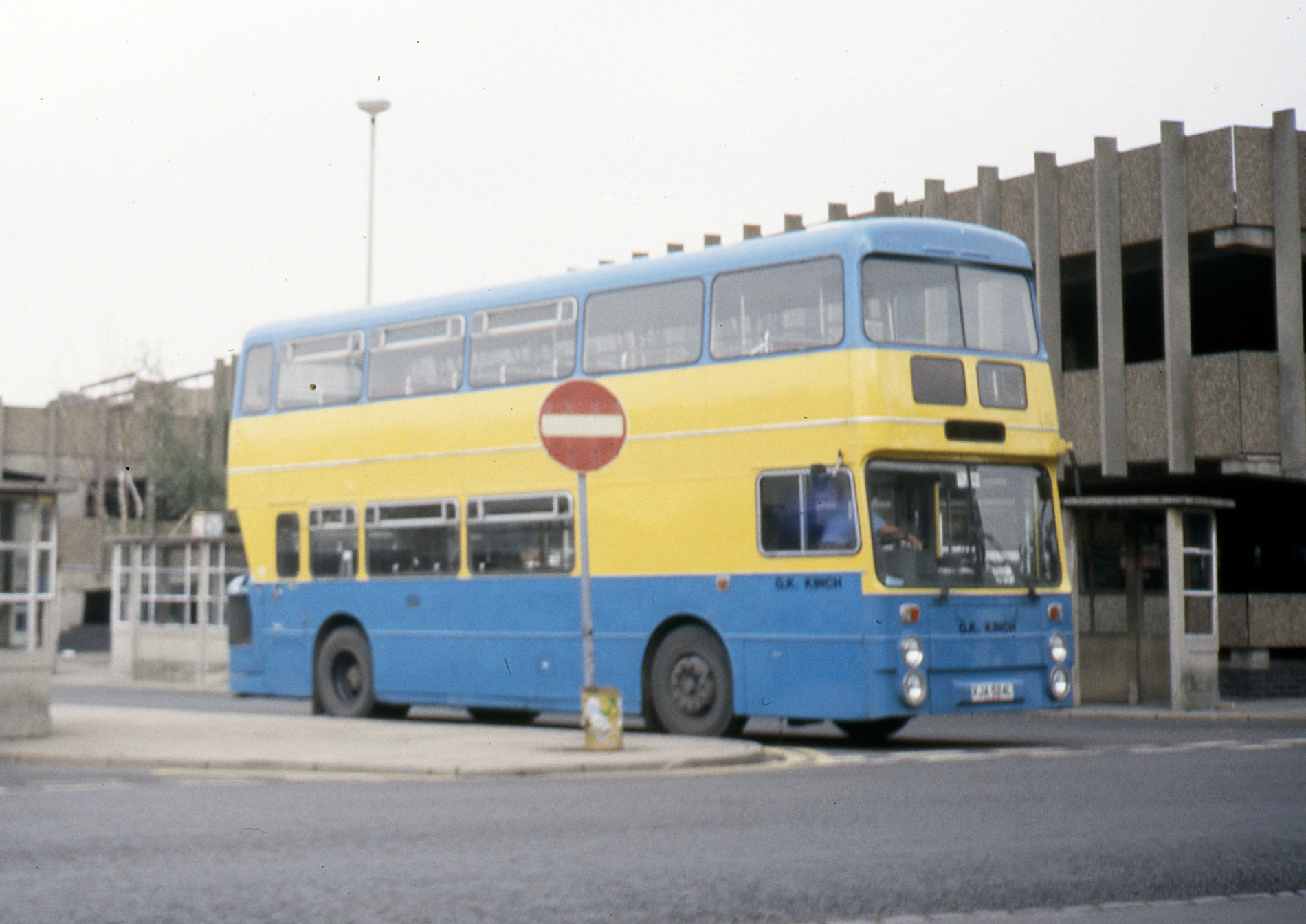
Park Royal bodied Leyland Atlantean in 1987

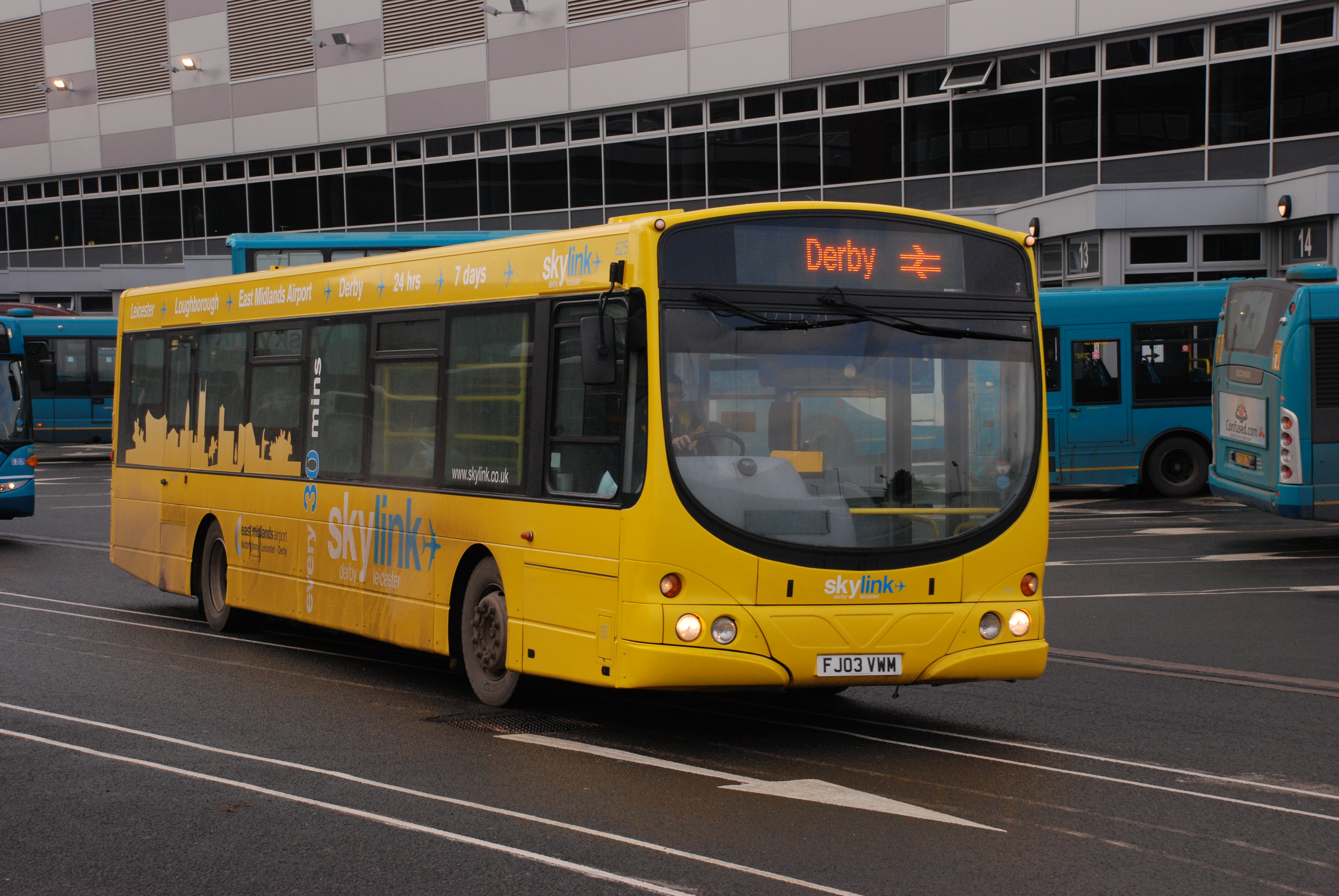
Scania L94UB-bodied Wright Solar in 2011 with an early iteration of the Skylink Derby livery

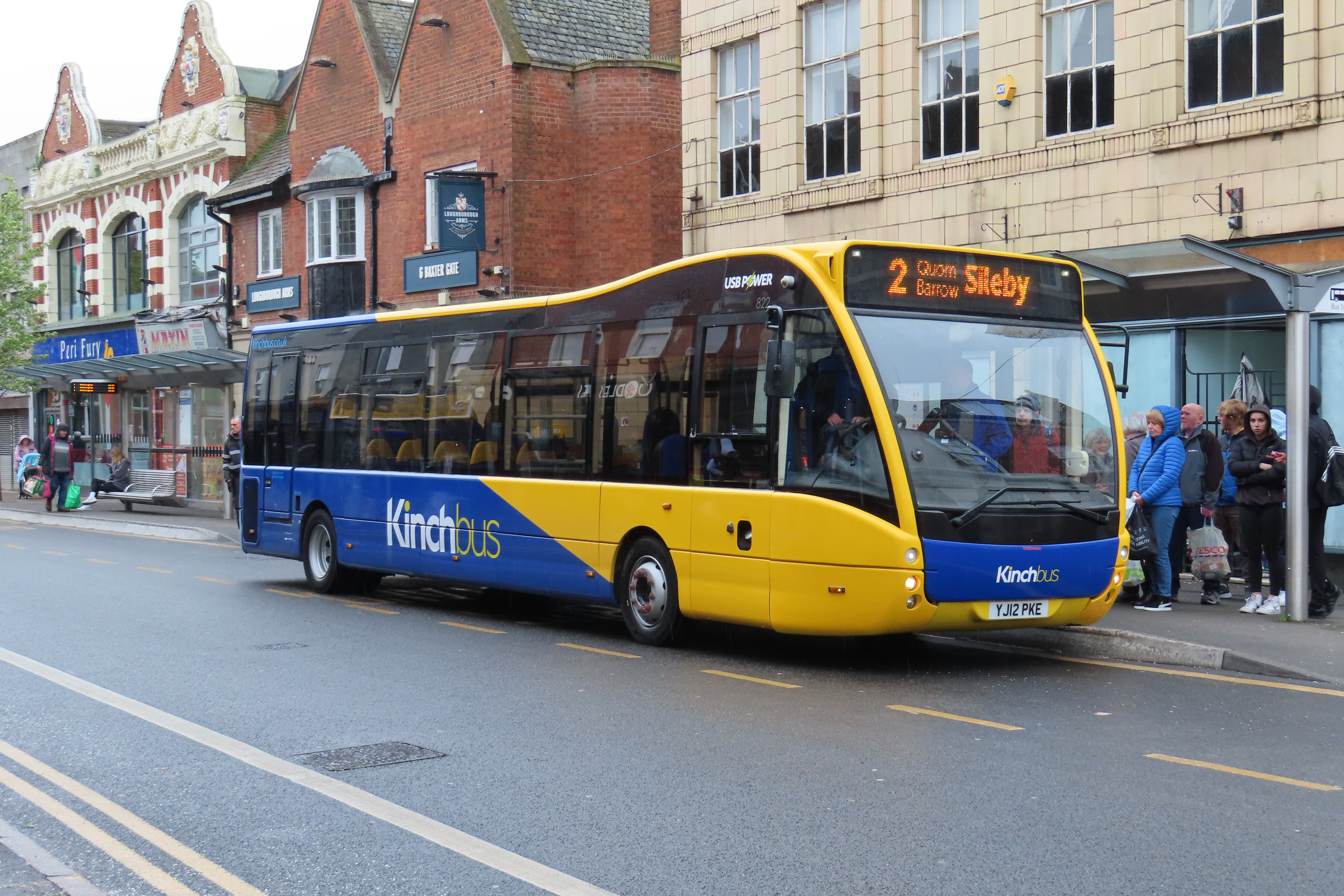
Optare Versa in 2024

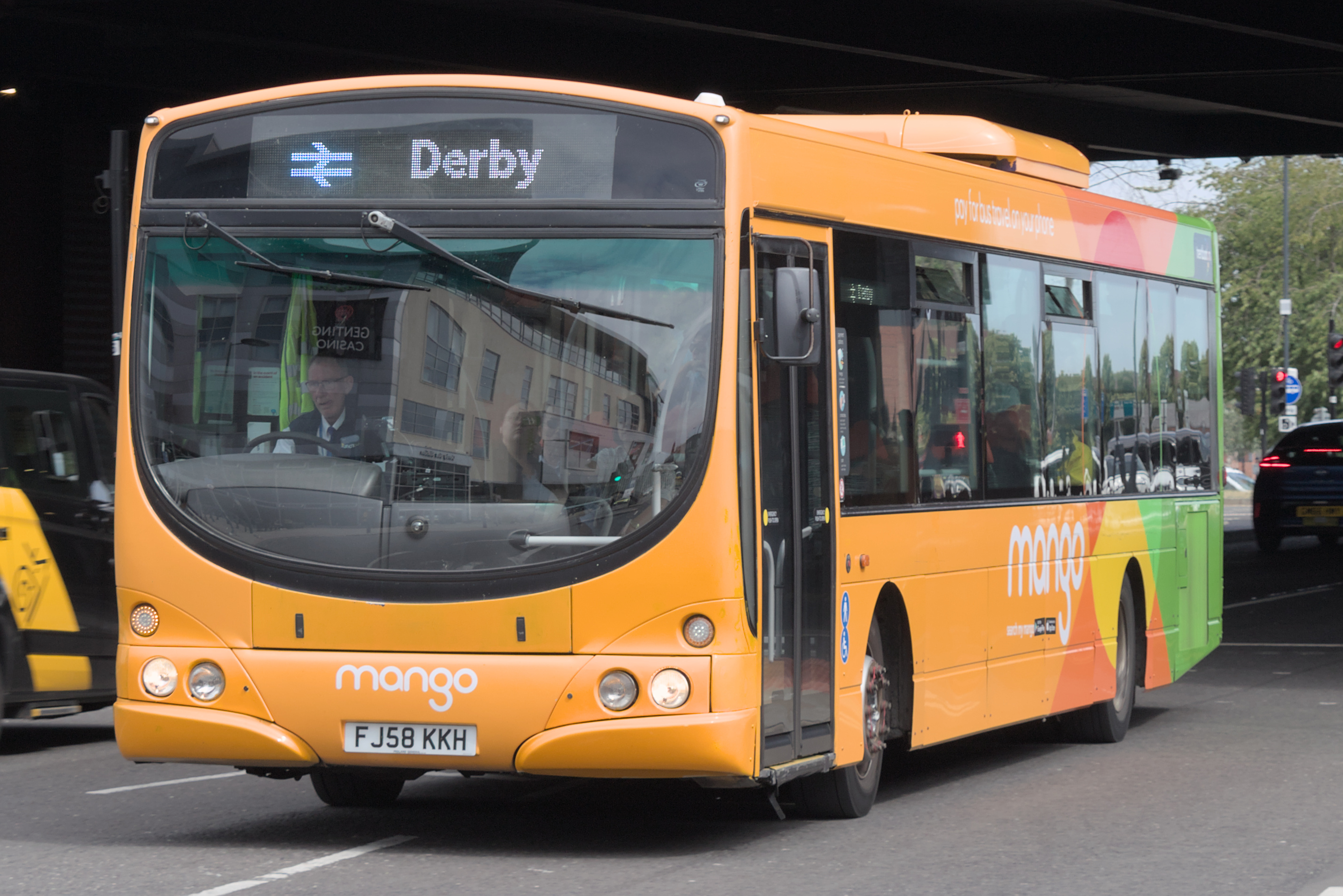
Volvo B7RLE-bodied Wright Eclipse Urban in 2025

Previous models under Kinchbus' fleet

Kinchbus was founded in 1987 by former Leicester City Football Club director Gilbert Kinch trading as G.K. Kinch and based in Barrow Upon Soar. Before moving into local bus services, Kinch had operated coaches from nearby Mountsorrel since at least 1972. In the early 1990s Kinchbus began to expand with services around Leicestershire and Nottinghamshire, including the purchase of Loughborough Bus and Coach from Midland Fox, giving the company its presence in Loughborough. In 1998 Kinchbus was sold to the Wellglade Group.

Since 2008 Kinchbus has operated the Skylink service between Derby and Loughborough. In April 2009, after the withdrawal of the Arriva Midlands service, it was extended into Leicester via the A6.

In January 2013, Kinchbus reintroduced service 9 between Loughborough and Nottingham, following the collapse of Nottingham-based operator Premiere Travel.

During September 2022, it was announced that current managing director Jeff Counsell will retire in February 2023 and will be succeeded by Tom Morgan who is the current commercial director for Kinchbus and fellow Wellglade Group subsidiary Trentbarton.

== Services ==
Kinchbus are the main provider of bus services within the Loughborough area alongside services to Nottingham and Leicester running 7 days a week, Kinchbus also provide Skylink services between Leicester and Derby via East Midlands Airport.

Following the 2026 cessation of Ct4n buses, Kinchbus announced they will be taking on a reduced operation of service 66 from 24th August.

=== Service Cutbacks ===
In August 2022, Kinchbus announced that their long-established number 2 service between Loughborough and Leicester would be cut back to Sileby from 4 September 2022 as a result of driver shortages and lower passenger numbers.

As part of a wider Wellglade Group post-COVID-19 pandemic review of services across the network, the Skylink Derby stopped serving Long Whatton and Diseworth from the 2nd of October 2022.

== Fleet ==
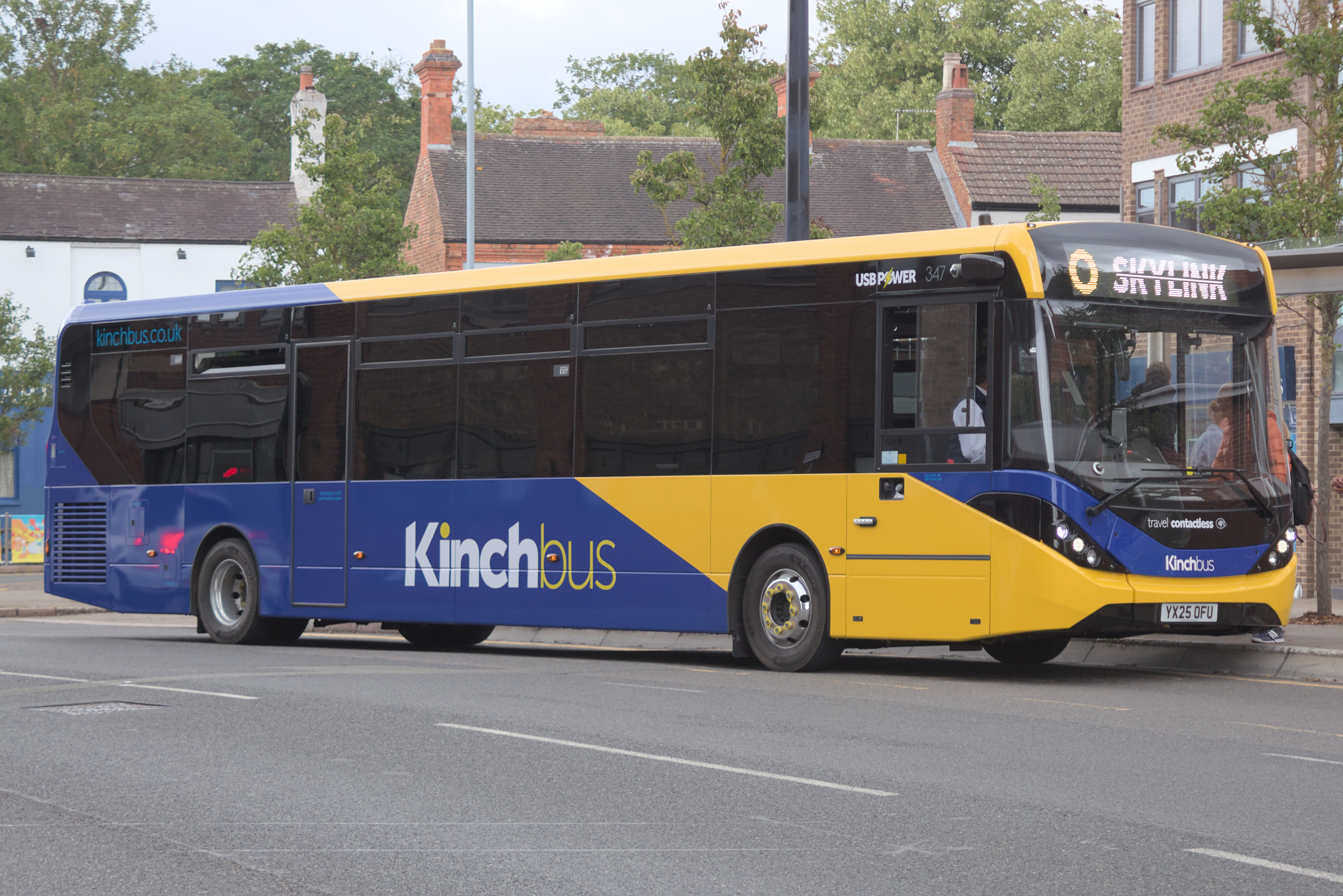
An Alexander Dennis Enviro200 MMC serving the Skylink Derby route in July 2025

As of March 2026, the fleet consists of around 40 buses, mostly built by Alexander-Dennis and Yutong.

Kinchbus invested in 18 Alexander-Dennis Enviro200MMC buses for the Skylink Derby service, which were launched during August 2025 and allowed the previous fleet to be cascaded to fellow Wellglade Group subsidiary trentbarton, including a number of buses on long-term loan from that company.

During 2024 it was announced that a joint ZEBRA bid between Kinchbus and Leicestershire County Council for 22 vehicles, consisting of 11 Yutong E9L and 11 Yutong E12 battery-electric buses, had been successful; the E9Ls entered service January 2026 and the E12s in March that same year.

=== Liveries ===
Most buses wear a two-tone yellow-and-blue livery, split diagonally along the side of the bus, with the yellow in front. This livery was originally introduced in 2007, and was facelifted twice, firstly in 2013 and then with the introduction of the aforementioned electric buses in 2026. Kinchbus's current logo dates from 2025, and is a subtle redesign of the previous logo which dated from 2013.

Most of Kinchbus's services had dedicated route-branded buses as in common with their sister company, Trentbarton; however, after the introduction of Kinchbus's electric buses, the Sprint service between Loughborough University and Loughborough railway station became Kinchbus's only service to use route-branded buses following the introduction of Kinchbus's electric buses apart from the Skylink Derby.

Skylink Derby buses use a separate two-tone livery, predominantly yellow with a dark blue rear section; this livery was introduced in 2025 with the delivery of sixteen new ADL Enviro200MMCs.

Kinchbus also operate a demand-responsive transport service in the west of the borough of Rushcliffe in southern Nottinghamshire, usually with a pair of Mercedes-Benz Sprinter minibuses which carry Nottinghamshire County Council's Nottsbus Connect livery of green and white with blue roofs.

== See also ==
- Trentbarton
- List of bus operators of the United Kingdom
