= Arriva Midlands East =

Bus operator in Leicestershire, England

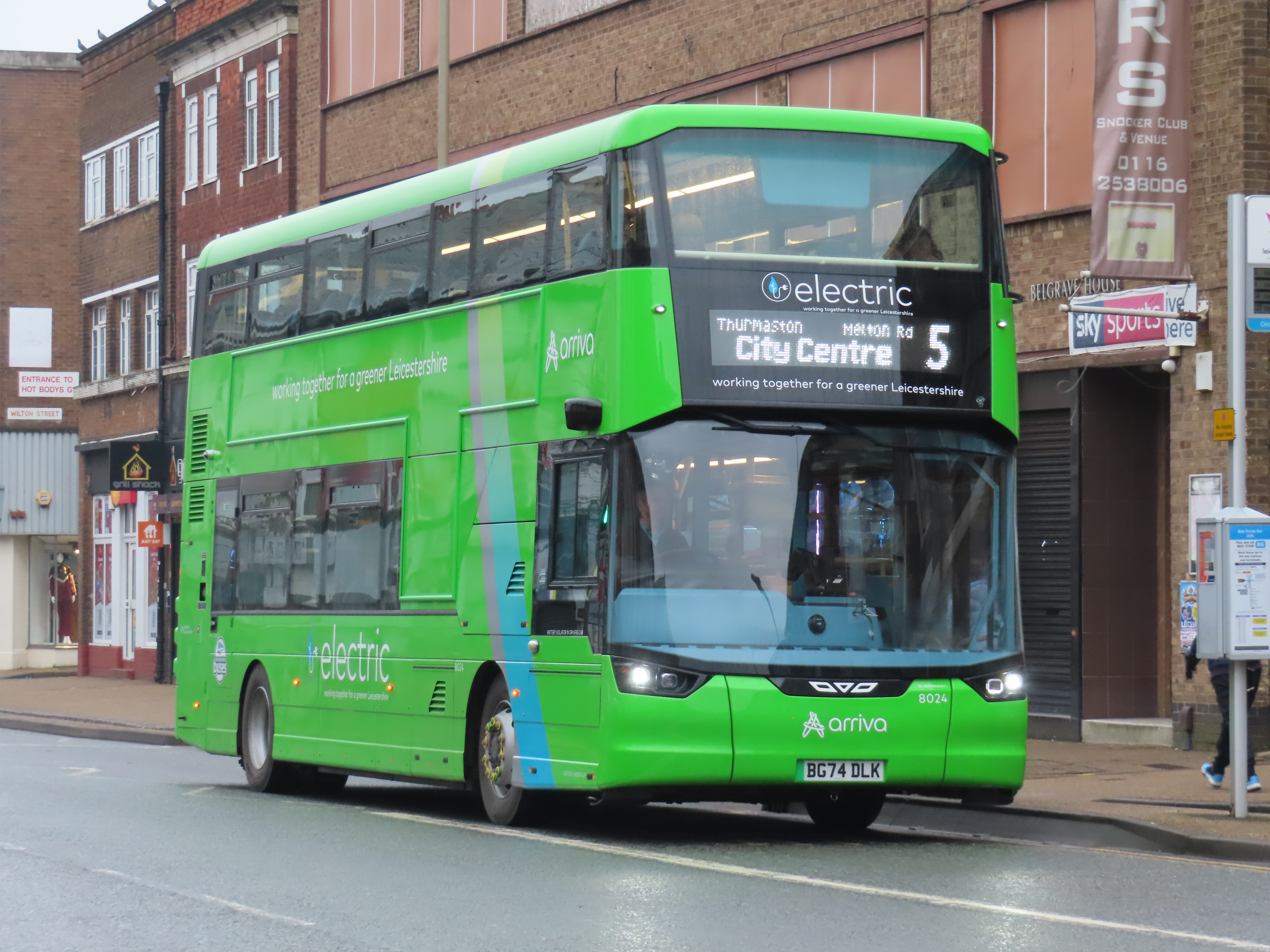
- Wright StreetDeck Electroliner battery electric bus in Leicester in February 2025
- Parent: Arriva Midlands
- Founded: 6 September 1981; 44 years ago
- Headquarters: 4 Westmoreland Avenue, Thurmaston
- Locale: Leicestershire
- Service area: Leicester; Loughborough; Melton Mowbray; Coalville; Ashby de la Zouch; Lutterworth; Hinckley; Nuneaton; Blaby; Market Harborough; Coventry
- Service type: Bus services
- Destinations: Leicestershire
- Depots: 3
- Fleet: 200+ (March 2014)
- Operator: Arriva Midlands (part of Arriva UK Bus)
- Website: www.arrivabus.co.uk/Midlands

Arriva Midlands East is a bus company operating services in Leicestershire, England. It is a trading division of Arriva Midlands which is a subsidiary of Arriva plc.

== History ==
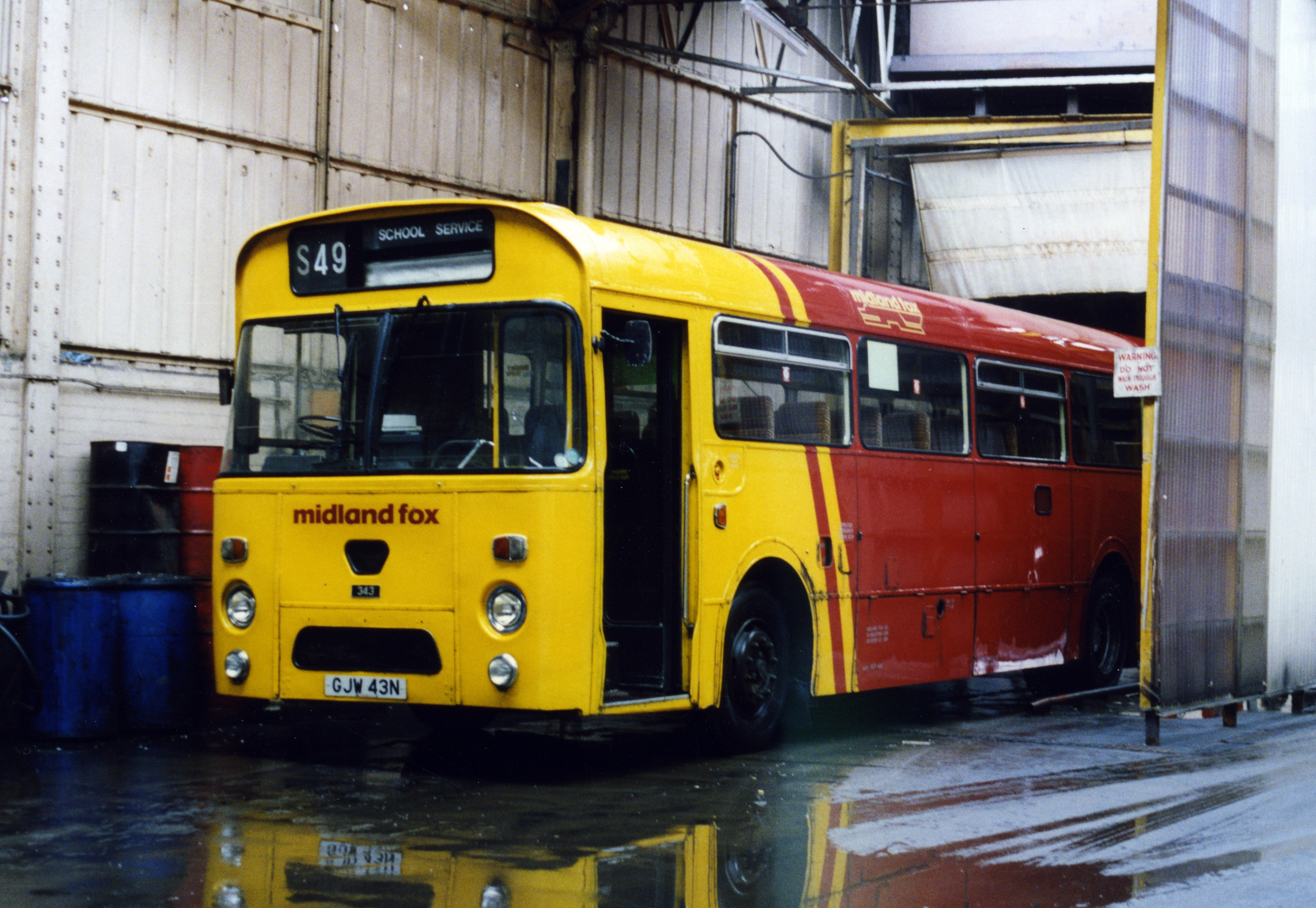
Midland Fox Marshall BET bodied Leyland Leopard at Coalville depot

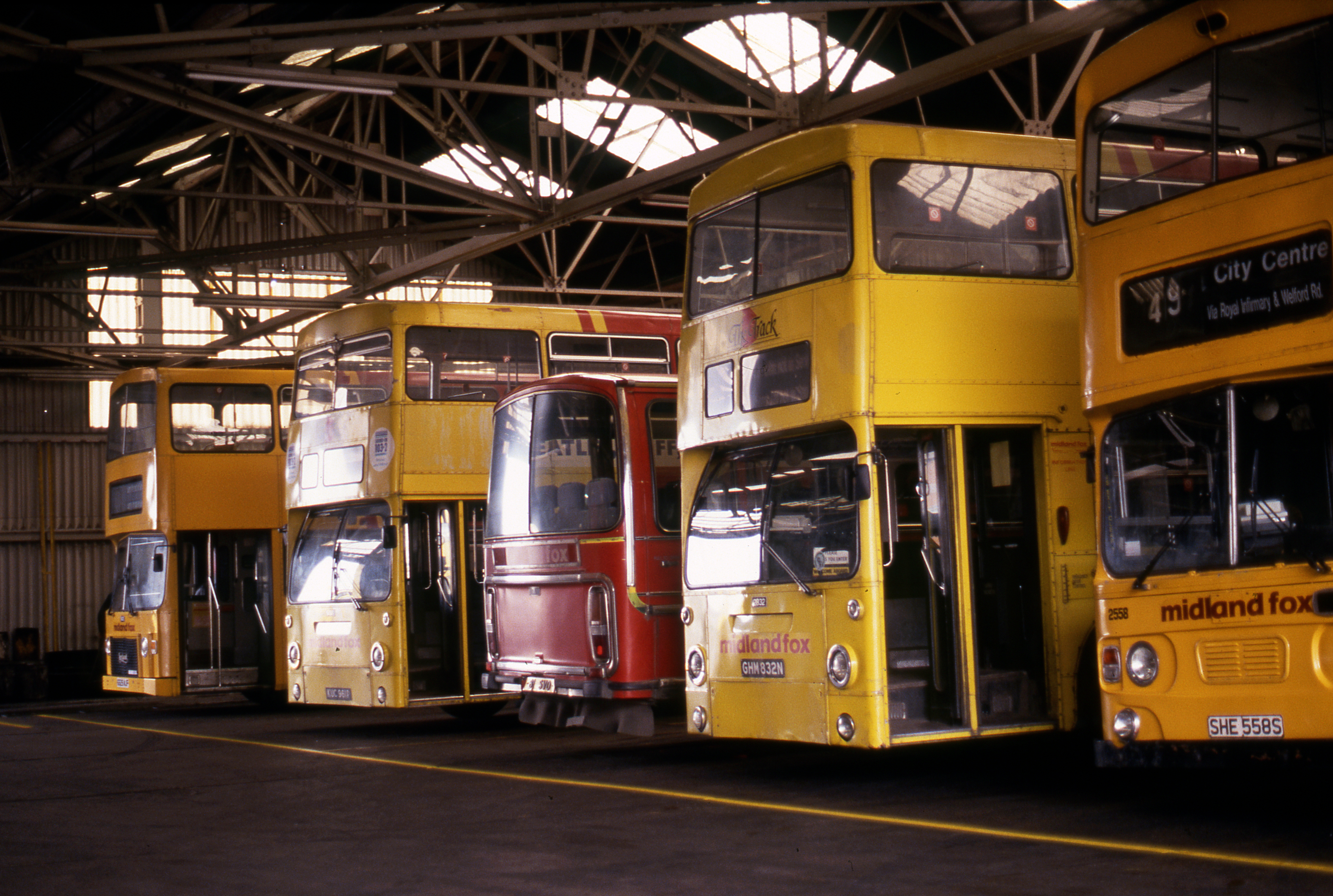
A variety of Midland Fox vehicles at South Wigston depot in 1991

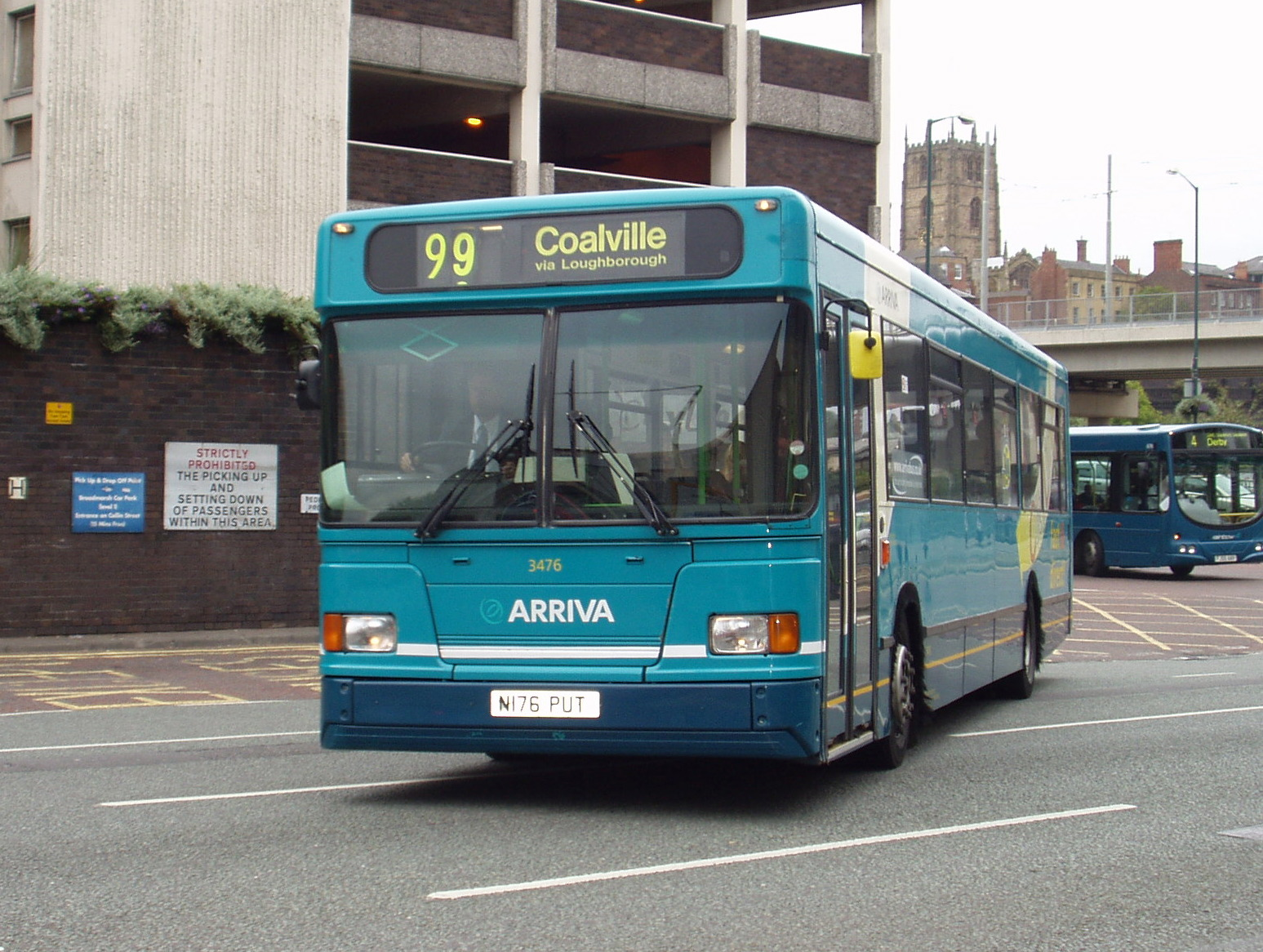
East Lancs European bodied Scania L113 in Nottingham in September 2007

In September 1981 Midland Red East was formed with 181 buses operating from five depots in Derbyshire, Leicestershire, Lincolnshire and Nottinghamshire as part of the breakup of the Midland Red bus company, and in January 1984 was renamed Midland Fox. In 1987 it was privatised in a management buyout. Several smaller operators including Loughborough Bus & Coach Company were purchased and in 1989 it was sold to the Drawlane Group. In November 1992 it was sold to British Bus which in August 1996 was sold to the Cowie Group.

In September 1996 the Sandacre Street, Leicester depot was closed. In November 1997 the Cowie Group was renamed Arriva and Midland Fox was rebranded as Arriva Fox County. In 2003 Arriva Fox County merged with Arriva Derby and Arriva Midland North to form Arriva Midlands.

On 11 July 2009 the Southgates depot closed and then on 3 October 2011 the Thurmaston depot and head office moved to a new purpose built depot on Westmoreland Avenue.

Arriva operated services around the Hinckley area until August 2008 when the operations were sold to Centrebus Holdings, a joint venture between Centrebus and Arriva. Arriva regained the Hinckley operations during 2013 when Centrebus ended their involvement in Centrebus Holdings and Arriva rebranded the Hinckley operation as Hinckley Bus, During late 2018 Arriva merged the Hinckley Bus services into their Leicestershire operations with the Hinckley Bus name ceasing to exist.

== Services ==
Arriva operate their services around Leicester from either Haymarket and St Margaret's Bus Stations.

Services around the Coalville area are operated from on-street stops around Memorial Square, while local services in Hinckley are operated from Hinckley Bus Station located on Waterloo Road.

=== Depots ===
Arriva operate from three depots across Leicestershire in Barwell, Hugglescote, and Thurmaston which is also the headquarters for Arriva Midlands. Until October 2021 there was a fourth depot located in South Wigston but this closed after being open since 1957 with most services being transferred to Thurmaston depot and the depot site sold to National Express Transport Solutions.

Until their cessation in July 2022, ArrivaClick services around Leicester were based at the Barwell depot.

=== Fleet ===
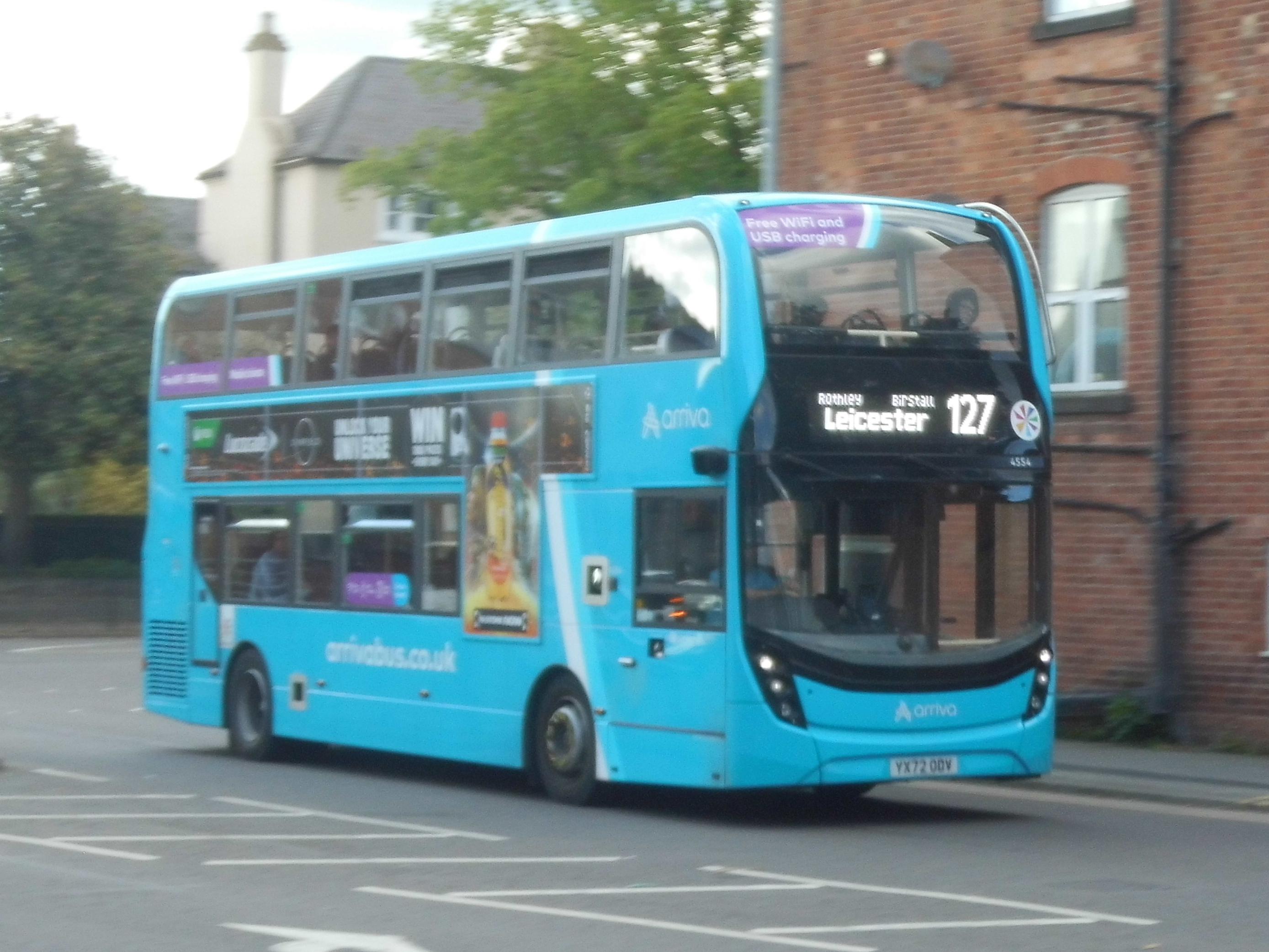
Alexander Dennis Enviro400 MMC in Loughborough operating service 127 to Leicester

As of March 2025, the Arriva Midlands East fleet consists of approximately 169 vehicles.

From January 2023, a brand new fleet of 8 Alexander Dennis Enviro 200 MMCs and 28 Alexander Dennis Enviro 400 MMCs entered service in Leicester, replacing Optare Versas and older Alexander Dennis Enviro 400 MMCs respectively.

During 2021 Leicester City Council successfully applied for £11 million of funding from the Government's ZEBRA scheme, which was used by Arriva Midlands to order 24 Wright StreetDeck Electroliner battery electric buses that were delivered by October 2023 and entered service from April 2024, mainly on the services 47, 48, 50 and 51 to the south of Leicester. They are Arriva's first electric double-decker buses delivered outside London, as well as the first low-height Wright Streetdeck Electroliners to be delivered.

== See also ==
- List of bus operators of the United Kingdom
